= Kirinishiki Toshirō =

Japanese sumo wrestler

Personal information
- Native name: 起利錦 利郎
- Born: Toshirō Yamada; 31 August 1962 (age 64) Kiryū, Gunma, Japan
- Height: 1.86 m (6 ft 1 in)
- Weight: 160 kg (350 lb)

Sport
- Sport: Sumo
- Retired: November, 1995
- Heya: Kagamiyama
- Record: 551-547-84
- Debut: March, 1978
- Highest rank: Maegashira 2 (March, 1987)
- Elder name: Katsunoura
- Championships: 1 (Makushita)
- Gold Stars: 3 Chiyonofuji; Futahaguro; Hokutoumi
- Updated on Sep. 2012

Kirinishiki Toshirō (born 31 August 1962 as Toshirō Yamada) is a former sumo wrestler from Kiryū, Gunma, Japan. He made his professional debut in March 1978, and reached the top division in July 1986. His highest rank was maegashira 2. He retired in November 1995, and as of 2017 he is an elder in the Japan Sumo Association under the name Katsunoura.

== Career ==
He was recruited from middle school by former yokozuna Kashiwado, and joined his Kagamiyama stable in March 1978. Initially fighting under the name Yamadanishiki, adapted from his own surname, he was given the shikona of Kirinishiki ("winning trophy") in 1984. In November 1985 he won the makushita division championship or yusho with a perfect 7–0 record and was promoted to the juryo division, becoming a fully fledged sekitori. After only three tournaments he reached the top makuuchi division in July 1986. He defeated yokozuna Chiyonofuji in their first meeting in March 1987 to earn the first of his three kinboshi, the others coming against Futahaguro in July 1987 and Hokutoumi four years later in July 1991. However he was never able to win a special prize or reach the sanyaku ranks, his highest position on the banzuke being maegashira 2. He fought in the top division for 34 tournaments with 213 wins against 248 losses, but also had 49 injury absences. On the 14th day of the March 1992 tournament he received a win by default when his opponent Wakahanada withdrew, but he then broke his toe in training the following morning and had to withdraw from his final match, falling to a make-koshi 7–8. He thus became one of the few wrestlers to immediately follow a win by default with a loss by default. In January 1993 he was forced to withdraw from what proved to be his final top division tournament with a left knee medial collateral ligament injury, and was demoted to juryo. He fell to the unsalaried makushita division in March 1995 before finally retiring in November 1995 at the age of 33. He had fought in 107 career tournaments with a winning percentage of just over 50 percent.

== Retirement from sumo ==
Upon retirement he became an elder of the Japan Sumo Association under the name Tatekawa Oyakata. His old stablemaster was in poor health and was soon succeeded by Kirinishiki's former stablemate Tagaryu. Although he was only borrowing the Tatekawa stock Kirinishiki was able to keep the name for the next 15 years, until its owner Tosanoumi retired in January 2011. He then switched to Kaio's Asakayama name, and then Ikazuchi, before in February 2012 switching to the Katsunoura name then owned by the former head of Isenoumi stable, ex-sekiwake Fujinokawa. He acquired the Katsunoura stock permanently in March 2013, securing his future in the Sumo Association. He has remained a coach at Kagamiyama stable, despite its small size (only two active wrestlers as of 2017). In March 2024, he was elected director of the Japan Sumo Association for the first time, his term of office to run until 2026.

== Personal life ==
In his spare time Kirinishiki had a keen interest in history, enjoying the historical novels of Ryōtarō Shiba and visiting historical sites while on regional tours (jungyo). He was also a fan of hard rock music and wrote a column for the Burrn! music magazine.

== Fighting style ==
Kirinshiki favoured yori (grappling) and tsuri (lifting) techniques.

== Career record ==
Kirinishiki Toshirō
Year	January Hatsu basho, Tokyo	March Haru basho, Osaka	May Natsu basho, Tokyo	July Nagoya basho, Nagoya	September Aki basho, Tokyo	November Kyūshū basho, Fukuoka
1978	x	(Maezumo)	East Jonokuchi #9; 3–4	West Jonidan #109; 5–2	East Jonidan #66; 2–5	West Jonidan #85; 2–5
1979	West Jonidan #94; 3–4	East Jonidan #92; 5–2	West Jonidan #56; 4–3	East Jonidan #40; 2–5	West Jonidan #63; 4–3	West Jonidan #44; 4–3
1980	East Jonidan #22; 6–1	West Sandanme #58; 0–1–6	West Jonidan #14; 4–3	East Sandanme #88; 3–4	West Jonidan #12; 3–4	West Jonidan #25; 3–4
1981	West Jonidan #39; 6–1	East Sandanme #71; 6–1	West Sandanme #20; 3–4	West Sandanme #28; 3–4	East Sandanme #39; 4–3	East Sandanme #26; 3–4
1982	West Sandanme #36; 4–3	West Sandanme #23; 5–2	West Makushita #58; 3–4	West Sandanme #17; 3–4	West Sandanme #35; 5–2	West Sandanme #4; 5–2
1983	East Makushita #42; 4–3	East Makushita #36; 5–2	West Makushita #18; 2–5	East Makushita #34; 3–4	West Makushita #44; 3–4	West Makushita #56; 5–2
1984	West Makushita #33; 5–2	West Makushita #18; 2–5	West Makushita #39; Sat out due to injury 0–0–7	West Sandanme #19; 6–1	West Makushita #44; 5–2	East Makushita #27; 6–1
1985	West Makushita #9; 2–5	West Makushita #25; 4–3	West Makushita #17; 4–3	East Makushita #12; 4–3	East Makushita #7; 3–4	East Makushita #15; 7–0; Champion
1986	East Jūryō #10; 9–6	West Jūryō #3; 9–6	West Jūryō #1; 8–7	West Maegashira #13; 6–9	East Jūryō #2; 9–6	East Maegashira #12; 9–6
1987	West Maegashira #6; 8–7	East Maegashira #2; 4–11 ★	West Maegashira #8; 8–7	East Maegashira #2; 4–11 ★	West Maegashira #9; 8–7	West Maegashira #3; 7–8
1988	East Maegashira #4; 4–11	East Maegashira #9; 8–7	West Maegashira #4; 5–9–1	East Maegashira #9; Sat out due to injury 0–0–15	East Maegashira #9; 7–8	East Maegashira #11; 7–8
1989	West Maegashira #11; Sat out due to injury 0–0–15	East Jūryō #10; 9–6	West Jūryō #3; 8–7	East Jūryō #1; 5–10	East Jūryō #5; 9–6	East Jūryō #1; 8–7
1990	East Maegashira #13; 9–6	West Maegashira #8; 6–9	East Maegashira #11; 9–6	East Maegashira #5; 7–8	East Maegashira #6; 6–9	East Maegashira #10; 9–6
1991	West Maegashira #4; 5–10	East Maegashira #11; 8–7	East Maegashira #9; 8–7	East Maegashira #5; 7–8 ★	East Maegashira #6; 8–7	West Maegashira #3; 7–8
1992	West Maegashira #4; 7–8	East Maegashira #5; 7–8	West Maegashira #6; 5–2–8	West Maegashira #10; 8–7	East Maegashira #5; 4–11	West Maegashira #12; 8–7
1993	West Maegashira #11; 0–5–10	East Jūryō #6; Sat out due to injury 0–0–15	East Jūryō #6; 7–8	West Jūryō #8; 10–5	West Jūryō #4; 5–10	East Jūryō #10; 6–9
1994	East Jūryō #13; 8–7	West Jūryō #7; 8–7	West Jūryō #6; 7–8	East Jūryō #9; 8–7	West Jūryō #6; 6–9	West Jūryō #10; 9–6
1995	West Jūryō #7; 4–11	West Makushita #2; 4–3	West Makushita #1; 3–4	East Makushita #5; 3–4	East Makushita #10; 3–4	West Makushita #14; Retired –
Record given as wins–losses–absences Top division champion Top division runner-up Retired Lower divisions Non-participation Sanshō key: F=Fighting spirit; O=Outstanding performance; T=Technique Also shown: ★=Kinboshi; P=Playoff(s); Divisions: Makuuchi — Jūryō — Makushita — Sandanme — Jonidan — Jonokuchi Makuuchi ranks: Yokozuna — Ōzeki — Sekiwake — Komusubi — Maegashira

== See also ==
- Glossary of sumo terms
- List of past sumo wrestlers
- List of sumo elders
