= Isenoumi =

Isenoumi may refer to:

- Isenoumi stable, a heya (or stable) of sumo wrestlers.
- Isenoumi-oyakata, a sumo toshiyori name.
- Kitakachidoki Hayato, head coach of Isenoumi stable and known as Isenoumi Oyakata
