= Zaōnishiki Toshimasa =

Sumo wrestler (1952–2020)

Personal information
- Native name: 蔵玉錦 敏正
- Born: Toshimasa Adachi; 3 September 1952 Yamagata, Yamagata
- Died: 9 August 2020 (aged 67) Ichikawa, Chiba
- Height: 1.83 m (6 ft 0 in)
- Weight: 135 kg (298 lb)

Sport
- Sport: Sumo
- Retired: January, 1983
- Heya: Isenoumi → Kagamiyama
- Record: 440-446
- Debut: September, 1970
- Highest rank: Maegashira 1 (January, 1981)
- Elder name: Tatekuma
- Championships: 1 (Jūryō)
- Gold Stars: 1 (Kitanoumi)
- Updated on Sep. 2012

Zaōnishiki Toshimasa (3 September 1952 – 9 August 2020), birth name Toshimasa Adachi, was a sumo wrestler from Yamagata, Japan. He made his professional debut in September 1970, and reached the top division in November 1976. His highest rank was maegashira 1. He retired in January 1983 and served as an elder in the Japan Sumo Association under several successive names. He reached the retirement age for elders of 65 in September 2017, but stayed with the Sumo Association for an additional two years as a consultant.

== Career ==
He was born in Yamagata, Yamagata. He played many sports in elementary school, including judo and swimming, and began to increase in size rapidly from the fourth grade. He was on a prestigious baseball team at Nihon University Yamagata High School, but was also academically gifted, especially in English and mathematics, and he was offered a place at the Nihon University College of Engineering. However, around this time he was spotted by a member of yokozuna Kashiwado's support group and persuaded to join Isenoumi stable. He made his debut in September 1970, alongside future yokozuna Chiyonofuji, maegashira Oko (later a sewanin) and jūryō Ushiwakamaru. He initially fought under his own surname of Adachi. When Kashiwado left Isenoumi to set up Kagamiyama stable in November of the same year, Adachi followed him.

He was promoted to elite sekitori status when he reached the jūryō division in July 1975, at the same time as his stablemate Konuma. In September 1976 he won the jūryō division yūshō or championship with a 10–5 record and was promoted to the top makuuchi division. He failed to get a winning record in his first two tournaments ranked in makuuchi, in November 1976 and March 1977. In January 1978 he reached the top division for the third time and changed his shikona to Zaōnishiki, after Mount Zaō in his native Yamagata Prefecture, but this failed to change his luck as he scored only 2–13 in that tournament. He finally established himself in makuuchi in March 1979. He reached his highest rank of maegashira 1 in January 1981, and was the last person to fight ōzeki Takanohana before his retirement, defeating him on the sixth day. In September 1981 he defeated yokozuna Kitanoumi to earn his only kinboshi. However, he finished the tournament with a losing record of 7–8 record and missed out on a special prize. After falling back to the jūryō division he retired in January 1983 at the age of 30, rather than face demotion to makushita. His top division record was 149 wins against 211 losses over 24 tournaments. He had not missed a bout in his career, fighting 886 consecutive matches over 75 tournaments.

== Retirement from sumo ==
Zaōnishiki did not own elder stock in the Japan Sumo Association but was able to borrow a succession of elder names to remain in sumo. He worked as a coach at Kagamiyama stable and became a judge of tournament bouts in 1994. Upon taking the elder name of Edagawa in 2002 he was transferred to Tokitsukaze stable. After the Tokitsukaze stable hazing scandal, when Tokitsuumi was persuaded to retire and become head of the stable, Zaōnishiki appeared at Tokitsuumi's retirement press conference and also took the Nishikijima elder name which Tokitsuumi had been intending to use himself before becoming Tokitsukaze. Zaōnishiki finally acquired his own elder name of Takekuma in December 2013 at the age of 61, after thirty years and 11 months of borrowing seven previous elder names. He was able to move up in the Sumo Association's hierarchy as a result, from toshiyori to shunin in April 2014. He reached the mandatory retirement age of 65 in September 2017, but was re-employed by Tokitsukaze stable for five years as a consultant. In September 2019 he retired 3 years early.

== Personal life ==
Zaōnishiki revealed in 2014 that he had undergone treatment for lung cancer. He died of multiple myeloma on 9 August 2020 at the age of 67.

== Fighting style ==
Zaōnishiki favoured a hidari-yotsu, or right hand outside, left hand inside grip on his opponent's mawashi. His most common winning kimarite or technique was yori-kiri, a straightforward force out. He also liked uwatenage, the overarm throw.

== Career record ==
Zaōnishiki Toshimasa
Year	January Hatsu basho, Tokyo	March Haru basho, Osaka	May Natsu basho, Tokyo	July Nagoya basho, Nagoya	September Aki basho, Tokyo	November Kyūshū basho, Fukuoka
1970	x	x	x	x	(Maezumō)	West Jonokuchi #1; 6–1
1971	East Jonidan #35; 5–2	East Sandanme #74; 3–4	West Jonidan #3; 4–3	East Sandanme #72; 4–3	West Sandanme #51; 4–3	West Sandanme #36; 3–4
1972	West Sandanme #46; 4–3	East Sandanme #37; 3–4	West Sandanme #46; 4–3	East Sandanme #37; 4–3	West Sandanme #28; 5–2	West Sandanme #2; 3–4
1973	East Sandanme #13; 4–3	East Sandanme #1; 5–2	West Makushita #39; 5–2	West Makushita #21; 5–2	West Makushita #11; 4–3	West Makushita #9; 4–3
1974	West Makushita #7; 4–3	East Makushita #6; 2–5	West Makushita #22; 3–4	East Makushita #31; 5–2	East Makushita #16; 5–2	West Makushita #8; 4–3
1975	East Makushita #6; 4–3	East Makushita #4; 4–3	East Makushita #3; 5–2	East Jūryō #13; 8–7	West Jūryō #11; 9–6	West Jūryō #8; 7–8
1976	East Jūryō #11; 8–7	West Jūryō #9; 7–8	West Jūryō #10; 9–6	West Jūryō #4; 9–6	West Jūryō #1; 10–5–P; Champion	East Maegashira #9; 5–10
1977	East Jūryō #1; 8–7	East Maegashira #13; 5–10	West Jūryō #3; 7–8	West Jūryō #4; 7–8	East Jūryō #5; 8–7	West Jūryō #2; 8–7
1978	East Maegashira #13; 2–13	West Jūryō #8; 8–7	East Jūryō #7; 6–9	East Jūryō #11; 8–7	East Jūryō #9; 9–6	East Jūryō #6; 10–5
1979	East Jūryō #2; 10–5	East Maegashira #12; 9–6	West Maegashira #6; 6–9	West Maegashira #10; 8–7	West Maegashira #4; 5–10	East Maegashira #8; 6–9
1980	East Maegashira #12; 8–7	East Maegashira #8; 8–7	East Maegashira #4; 6–9	West Maegashira #5; 8–7	East Maegashira #2; 5–10	West Maegashira #5; 8–7
1981	West Maegashira #1; 6–9	East Maegashira #3; 5–10	West Maegashira #6; 6–9	West Maegashira #10; 9–6	East Maegashira #4; 7–8 ★	East Maegashira #5; 7–8
1982	East Maegashira #6; 4–11	West Maegashira #10; 5–10	East Jūryō #1; 10–5	East Maegashira #12; 6–9	West Maegashira #14; 5–10	West Jūryō #5; 6–9
1983	East Jūryō #10; Retired; 4–11	x	x	x	x	x
Record given as wins–losses–absences Top division champion Top division runner-up Retired Non-participation Jūryō Lower divisions Sanshō key: F=Fighting spirit; O=Outstanding performance; T=Technique Also shown: ★=Kinboshi; P=Playoff(s); Divisions: Makuuchi — Jūryō — Makushita — Sandanme — Jonidan — Jonokuchi Makuuchi ranks: Yokozuna — Ōzeki — Sekiwake — Komusubi — Maegashira

== See also ==
- Glossary of sumo terms
- List of past sumo wrestlers
- List of sumo elders
- List of sumo tournament second division champions
