= Ikioi Shōta =

Japanese sumo wrestler

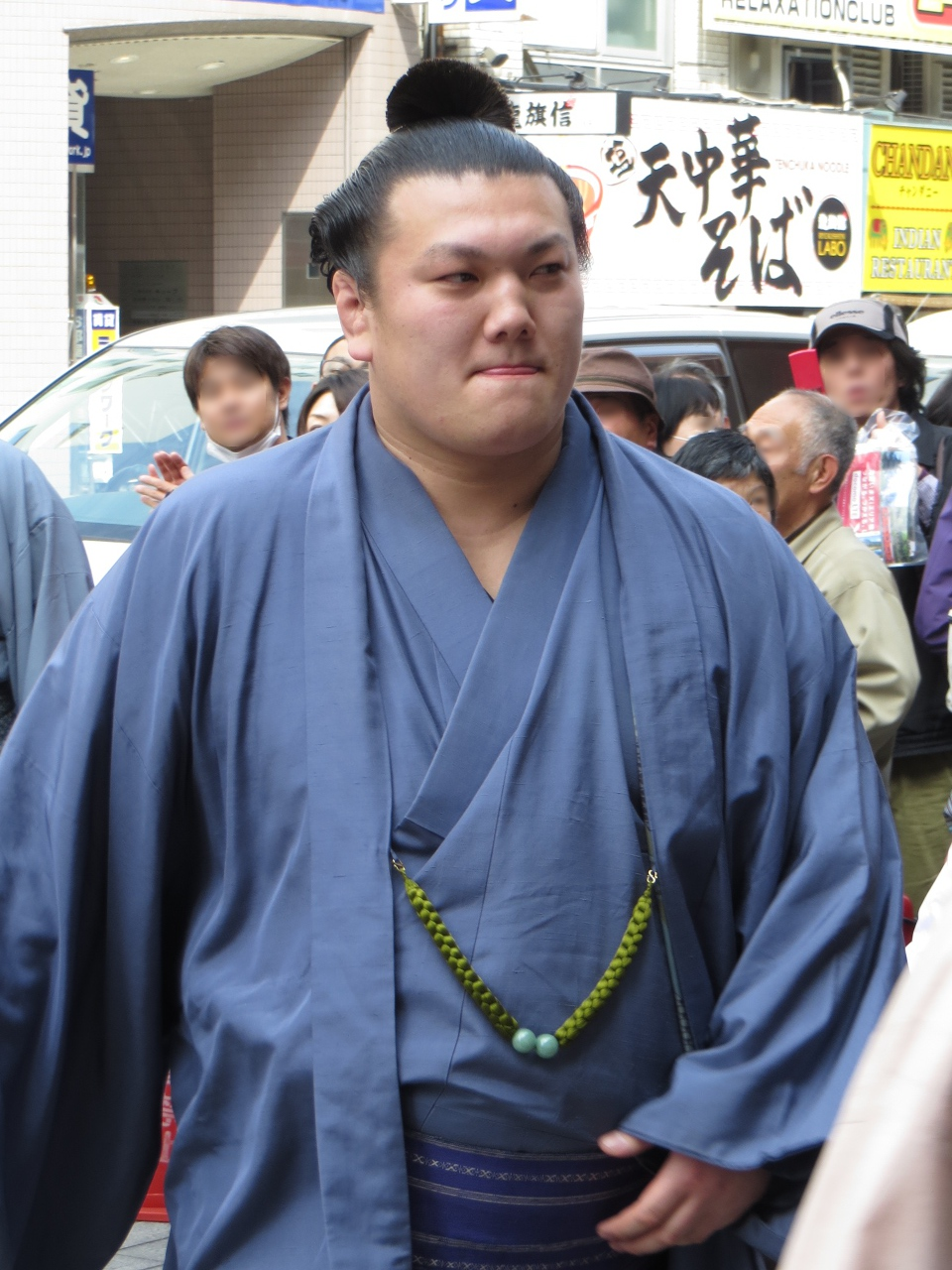
- Ikioi in 2013

Personal information
- Native name: 勢 翔太
- Born: Shōta Toguchi; 11 October 1986 (age 40) Katano, Osaka, Japan
- Height: 1.93 m (6 ft 4 in)
- Weight: 161 kg (355 lb; 25.4 st)

Sport
- Sport: Sumo
- Retired: June, 2021
- Heya: Isenoumi
- Record: 546-545-14
- Debut: March, 2005
- Highest rank: Sekiwake (May, 2016)
- Elder name: Kasugayama
- Championships: 2 (Jūryō)
- Special Prizes: 4 (Fighting Spirit)
- Gold Stars: 5 Hakuho (2); Kakuryū (2); Kisenosato
- Updated on June 21, 2021

Ikioi Shōta (Japanese: 勢 翔太; born 11 October 1986 as Shōta Toguchi (東口 翔太)) is a Japanese former professional sumo wrestler from Katano, Osaka. He began his career in March 2005. He won the jūryō championship in November 2011 in his very first tournament in the division and just two tournaments later made his makuuchi division debut. He was runner up to Jōkōryū in the jūryō division in September 2012. His highest rank was sekiwake. He won four special prizes for Fighting Spirit and five gold stars for defeating yokozuna. He did not miss a single bout from his professional debut until the last day of the January 2021 tournament. He retired in June 2021 to become a coach and elder of the Japan Sumo Association under the name Kasugayama.

== Early life and sumo background ==
From his preschool years Toguchi was enrolled at a local sumo dōjō, coincidentally the future Gōeidō was also enrolled there at this time. In 1996 as a primary school fourth grader, he came in runner up at a national children's sumo tournament. After junior high school, he attempted to enter Hōtoku Gakuen high school which had a strong sumo team, but when he failed he decided to take a break from sumo and worked at his parents' sushi restaurant for three years while continuing to stay in shape.

== Career ==
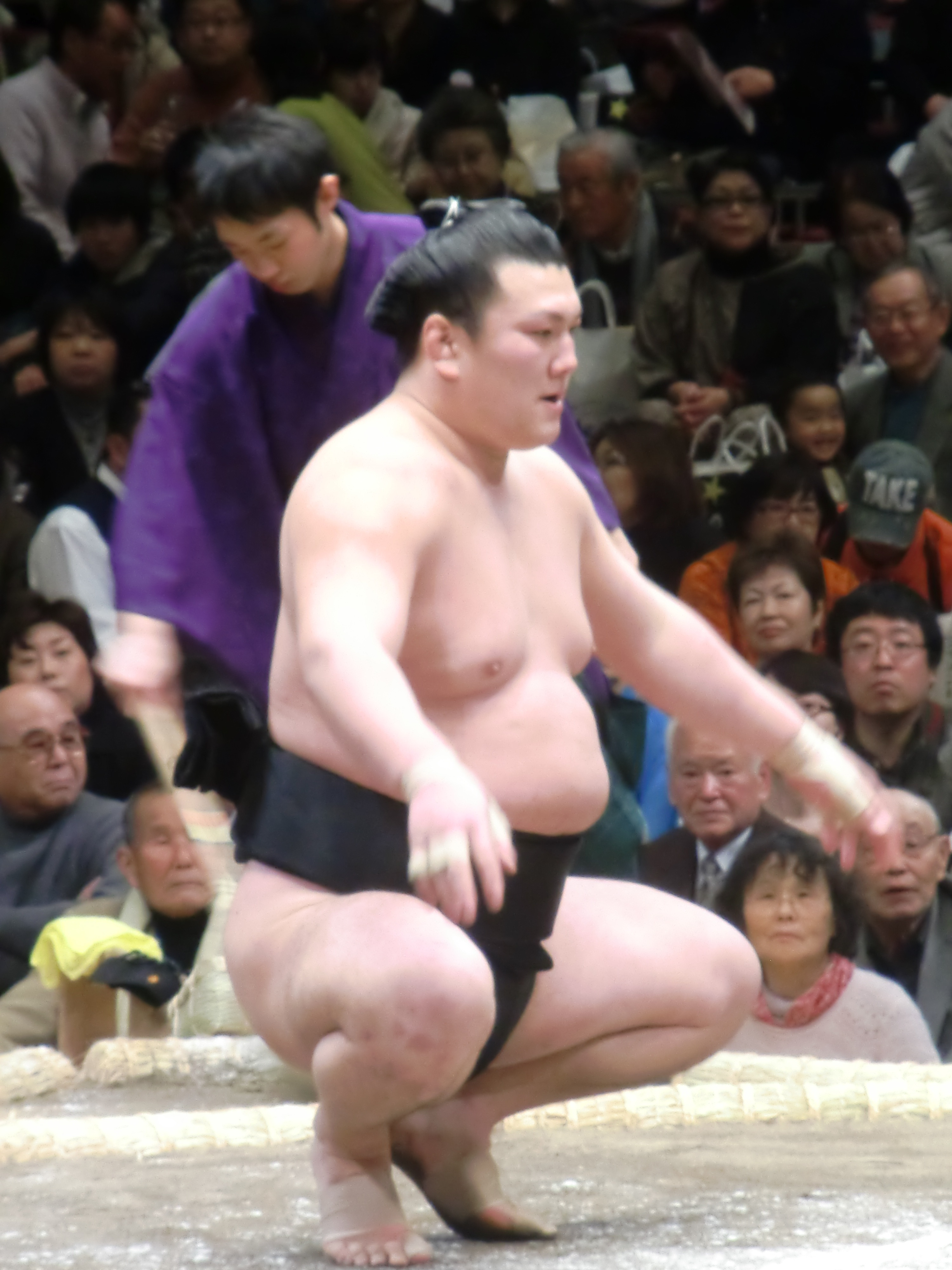
Ikioi during the January 2012 tournament.

Acceding to his mother's wishes, at eighteen he joined Isenoumi stable and first entered the ring in March 2005. He took the shikona or ring name of Ikioi from his first pro tournament. In his second tournament in July 2005 in the jonidan division he achieved a perfect record, but lost his second bout in a three-way playoff for the championship to the future Daidō. In September 2006 while competing in the makushita division he was punched in the face in the dressing room after a bout with forty-year-old Kotokanyu, who apparently objected to being slapped around the face (a legitimate tactic known as harite) by someone over twenty years his junior. Kotokanyu was told to retire immediately afterwards. Over the next five years, Ikioi managed to work his way slowly up the ranks until he was finally awarded promotion to the salaried jūryō division after a 5–2 record at makushita 3 in September 2011. In contrast to his slow progress previously, Ikioi found unprecedented success in the jūryō second division. He had only one loss in the first thirteen days of his jūryō debut, and even though he lost his last two bouts he still managed to win the tournament. His 10–5 record in the following January 2012 tournament earned him promotion to the makuuchi top division.

Ikioi was the first wrestler to have only one Chinese character in his ring name to enter the top division since Yokozuna Akebono in 1990. He posted only posted a 5–10 record in his makuuchi debut in March and was immediately relegated back to jūryō. He repeated the same pattern in the following two tournaments, posting a strong winning record in upper jūryō to again enter makuuchi only to get a 7–8 losing record to again be relegated to the lower division. His September 2012 division effort at jūryō 1 was where he managed to turn things around, achieving an 11–4 record and a chance at the championship which he lost to Jōkōryū in a playoff. This performance saw him promoted to maegashira 10. He achieved his first kachi-koshi or winning record in the top division at the third attempt in November 2012, and was promoted to maegashira 5 for the January 2013 tournament. In this basho he defeated his first ever san'yaku opponent, Tochiōzan, and came through with another winning record.

Now a makuuchi regular, in the May 2014 tournament recorded an 11–4 at maegashira 5 and received his second special prize for Fighting Spirit. In September his bout against Ichinojo was stopped by the referee after he suffered a heavy nosebleed from striking Ichinojo's shoulder, a rare occurrence, but he still went on to win. He made his sanyaku debut at komusubi rank in the November 2014 tournament. However, he scored only six wins, and struggled badly when facing the top ranked wrestlers again, scoring only 1–14 at maegashira 2 in January and 2–13 at maegashira 3 in July. When dropped to maegashira 12 in September he returned to form, and after eleven days he was in second place with a 10–1 record. He then lost his next three but recovered to beat Amuuru on the final day to end with an 11–4 record and a Fighting Spirit prize. In November he produced his best performance in the top division, winning twelve matches and finishing in a three-way tie for second place. He also earned his fourth Fighting Spirit prize.

In January 2016 Ikioi was ranked at komusubi again but recorded only five wins and was relegated to maegashira 4. He performed much better in March, posting a 10–5 record: only a loss to Kotoyuki on the final day prevented him from taking a fifth Fighting Spirit prize. With both komusubi and both sekiwake having losing records in that tournament, Ikioi was promoted to sekiwake for the first time for the following May 2016 basho. He became the first sekiwake from Isenoumi stable since Tosanoumi was promoted in 1997. He lost the rank after scoring only 4–11, but he earned a first kinboshi or gold star for a yokozuna upset in the July tournament in Nagoya, defeating Hakuhō on the ninth day. In November 2016 he faced Kagayaki, a match which saw two wrestlers with single-kanji fighting names meet in the top division for the first time since the introduction of the yūshō system in 1909.

He earned his second kinboshi in defeating Kakuryū in January 2017, and his third in beating Hakuhō again in the following tournament in March. The win over Hakuhō was in front of his hometown Osaka fans, and he later recalled it as one of the most memorable wins of his career. In March 2018 he finished with an 11–4 record, but a defeat on the final day meant he missed out on a share of the Fighting Spirit Prize. Having not missed a bout since his professional debut, Ikioi fought his 500th consecutive makuuchi match in May 2018. In March 2019 he was suffering from cellulitis and a fever but did not pull out of the tournament, not wanting to disappoint the fans in his native Osaka Prefecture, and won just two bouts. He was demoted to the jūryō division for the May 2019 tournament, bringing to an end his streak of 585 consecutive top division matches since November 2012. He returned to the top division in January 2020 following an 11–4 playoff defeat the previous November, but was once again demoted to jūryō after the July 2020 tournament. Fighting from the rank of jūryō 12 in January 2021 he recorded only a 6–9 score, forfeiting his final match against Tsurugishō due to a hand injury, the first absence of his career. This brought to an end his run of 1090 consecutive bouts from his career debut, the third highest among active wrestlers. He sat out both the following March and May tournaments, and had two surgeries, but they failed to fix the problem.

== Retirement from sumo ==
Ikioi announced his retirement from sumo in June 2021, on the day of the release of the banzuke for the July 2021 tournament where he had fallen to sandanme 21. He became an elder of the Japan Sumo Association, having acquired the Kasugayama elder stock, and will work as a coach at Isenoumi stable.

Ikioi's danpatsu-shiki (retirement ceremony) was held on 4 June 2023 at the Ryōgoku Kokugikan. About 250 people took turns to cut the ōichōmage bun, with Isenoumi stablemaster (former maegashira Kitakachidoki) making the final cut. Since Ikioi was a wrestler particularly known for his singing skills, the ceremony also featured a duet by Ikioi with popular enka singer Jōji Yamamoto. Ayaka Hirahara, a friend of 15 years, also gave a two-song concert.

As Kasugayama, he notably led the effort to reintroduce folk song (jinku) classes into the curriculum for apprentices attending classes at the Ryōgoku Kokugikan training school.

== Fighting style ==
Ikioi favoured a migiyotsu (right hand inside, left hand outside grip on his opponent′s mawashi). His favourite winning kimarite was a straightforward yorikiri, or force out. He also regularly employed oshidashi, or push out, and sukuinage, or scoop throw.

== Personal life ==
In June 2018 his engagement to professional golfer Mamiko Higa was announced. The couple met at a sumo event in 2015. They had intended to marry on their mutual birthdays on October 11, 2018, but this did not go ahead. The engagement has reportedly been broken off.

== Career record ==
Ikioi Shōta
Year	January Hatsu basho, Tokyo	March Haru basho, Osaka	May Natsu basho, Tokyo	July Nagoya basho, Nagoya	September Aki basho, Tokyo	November Kyūshū basho, Fukuoka
2005	x	(Maezumo)	West Jonokuchi #22; 4–3	East Jonidan #122; 7–0–PP	West Sandanme #98; 6–1	East Sandanme #37; 5–2
2006	West Sandanme #9; 3–4	West Sandanme #21; 5–2	East Makushita #56; 5–2	East Makushita #35; 3–4	East Makushita #46; 4–3	West Makushita #37; 4–3
2007	East Makushita #29; 3–4	East Makushita #40; 4–3	East Makushita #36; 4–3	West Makushita #28; 3–4	East Makushita #37; 3–4	East Makushita #49; 3–4
2008	East Makushita #57; 5–2	West Makushita #35; 3–4	West Makushita #44; 3–4	East Makushita #54; 4–3	East Makushita #43; 3–4	West Makushita #53; 5–2
2009	West Makushita #37; 4–3	West Makushita #30; 4–3	West Makushita #23; 4–3	East Makushita #18; 3–4	East Makushita #25; 2–5	East Makushita #41; 4–3
2010	East Makushita #35; 5–2	East Makushita #25; 3–4	West Makushita #30; 5–2	West Makushita #22; 4–3	West Makushita #14; 6–1	West Makushita #2; 3–4
2011	East Makushita #5; 3–4	West Makushita #8; Tournament Cancelled; Match fixing investigation 0–0–0	West Makushita #8; 3–4	West Makushita #8; 4–3	East Makushita #3; 5–2	East Jūryō #14; 12–3; Champion
2012	East Jūryō #3; 10–5	West Maegashira #14; 5–10	East Jūryō #2; 8–7	East Maegashira #16; 7–8	East Jūryō #1; 11–4–P	East Maegashira #10; 9–6
2013	West Maegashira #5; 8–7	West Maegashira #3; 4–11	West Maegashira #9; 9–6	East Maegashira #5; 9–6	West Maegashira #1; 5–10	West Maegashira #6; 11–4; F
2014	West Maegashira #2; 6–9	West Maegashira #4; 7–8	West Maegashira #5; 11–4; F	East Maegashira #1; 5–10	West Maegashira #5; 10–5	West Komusubi #1; 6–9
2015	West Maegashira #2; 1–14	East Maegashira #13; 8–7	East Maegashira #10; 10–5	East Maegashira #3; 2–13	East Maegashira #12; 11–4; F	East Maegashira #4; 12–3; F
2016	East Komusubi #1; 5–10	East Maegashira #4; 10–5	West Sekiwake #1; 4–11	West Maegashira #4; 5–10 ★	West Maegashira #7; 7–8	West Maegashira #8; 10–5
2017	West Maegashira #3; 8–7 ★	West Maegashira #1; 5–10 ★	West Maegashira #6; 9–6	East Maegashira #3; 4–11 ★	West Maegashira #7; 6–9	West Maegashira #10; 9–6
2018	West Maegashira #6; 4–11	East Maegashira #14; 11–4	West Maegashira #5; 8–7	East Maegashira #2; 8–7 ★	East Maegashira #1; 3–12	East Maegashira #8; 6–9
2019	West Maegashira #11; 9–6	West Maegashira #9; 2–13	West Jūryō #1; 4–11	West Jūryō #8; 5–10	West Jūryō #12; 12–3; Champion	East Jūryō #3; 11–4–P
2020	West Maegashira #15; 8–7	West Maegashira #12; 8–7	West Maegashira #9; Tournament Cancelled; State of Emergency; 0–0–0	West Maegashira #9; 3–12	East Jūryō #1; 3–12	West Jūryō #8; 5–10
2021	East Jūryō #13; 6–9	East Makushita #1; Sat out due to injury 0–0–7	East Makushita #41; Sat out due to injury 0–0–7	East Sandanme #21; Retired –	x	x
Record given as wins–losses–absences Top division champion Top division runner-up Retired Lower divisions Non-participation Sanshō key: F=Fighting spirit; O=Outstanding performance; T=Technique Also shown: ★=Kinboshi; P=Playoff(s); Divisions: Makuuchi — Jūryō — Makushita — Sandanme — Jonidan — Jonokuchi Makuuchi ranks: Yokozuna — Ōzeki — Sekiwake — Komusubi — Maegashira

== See also ==
- List of sumo tournament top division runners-up
- List of sumo tournament second division champions
- Glossary of sumo terms
- List of past sumo wrestlers
- List of sekiwake
