= Kagamiō Hideoki =

Mongolian sumo wrestler

Kagamiō Hideoki 鏡桜 秀興
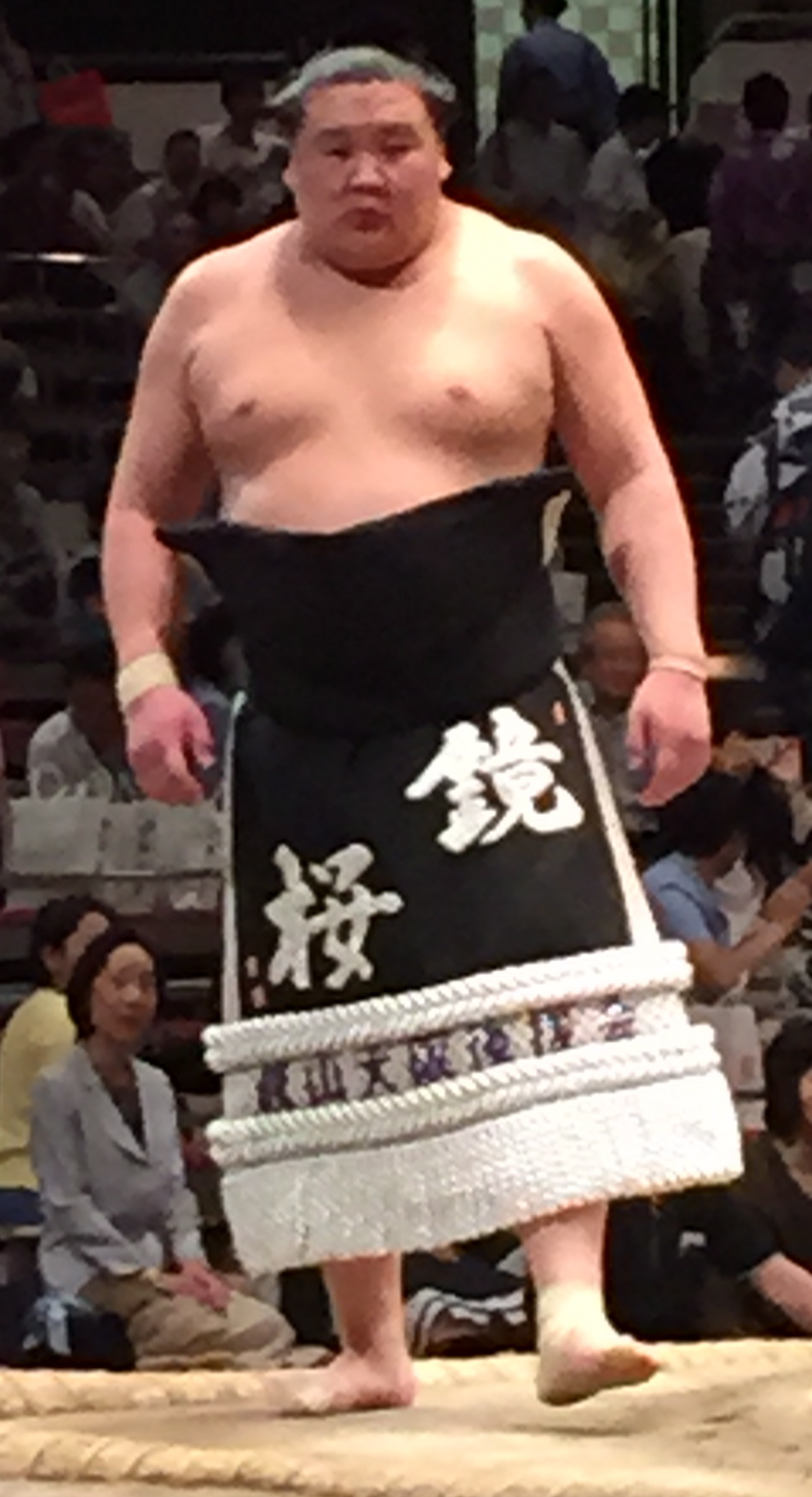
- Kagamiō in 2015

Personal information
- Born: Batkhuu Nanjid; February 9, 1988 (age 38) Ulaanbaatar, Mongolian People's Republic
- Height: 182 cm (5 ft 11 1/2 in)
- Weight: 136 kg (300 lb)

Sport
- Sport: Sumo
- Retired: March, 2023
- Heya: Kagamiyama → Isenoumi
- Record: 835-437-408
- Debut: July, 2003
- Highest rank: Maegashira 9 (September, 2015)
- Championships: 1 Jūryō; 1 Makushita; 1 Sandanme
- Updated on 28 March 2023

Kagamiō Hideoki (Japanese: 鏡桜 秀興; born 9 February 1988 as Batkhuu Nanjid (Mongolian: Батхүүгийн Нанжид)) is a former Mongolian-born professional sumo wrestler from Ulaanbaatar. He made his debut in July 2003 for Kagamiyama stable. He reached the jūryō division in January 2013 and the top makuuchi division a year after that. His highest rank was maegashira 9. Following a long-term injury layoff he fell off the banzuke or ranking sheets in 2021. In March 2023 he obtained Japanese citizenship.

== Early life and sumo background ==
In his younger years he took part in basketball and Mongolian wrestling. When he was 13 he asked his basketball coach what had become of the former skilled basketball player Mönkhbat Davaajargal (who would later become the yokozuna Hakuhō). When he heard Davaajargal had moved to Japan to try his hand at sumo, Nanjid himself began to seriously think about doing the same thing himself. In 2003 at the invitation of the then active Kyokushūzan he came to Japan along with the future Tokusegawa. He soon joined Kagamiyama stable and first entered the ring in maezumō in July 2003. He took the shikona Kagamiō Nanji (鏡桜 南二), the surname taken from part of his stable's name and the given name because it sounds similar to his real given name of Nanjid.

== Career ==
His name appeared on the banzuke in September 2003. During the tournament, he lost to Tokusegawa with whom he had come to Japan. Though he did manage to get a majority of wins in his first tournament, his continuing low weight of around 90 kilograms was one factor holding him back and he struggled in the jonidan division for close to two years. Kagamiyama stable had not had new entrants for quite some time, with the only other wrestler in the stable being Ryūsei, the son of the stablemaster, former sekiwake Tagaryū. This was not a satisfactory situation for training, so Kagamiō would often commute to the now defunct Nakamura stable to get adequate practice with other wrestlers.

He finally reached the sandanme division in May 2005, though it took him until the September tournament before he managed to achieve a majority of wins in this division. He would again struggle, spending around three years trying to break out. In May 2008 he put up his best record up to this time of 6–1 and was promoted to the makushita division in July 2008. A few bumps would send him back to sandanme twice, and he fought even longer in this division, taking four years to reach the cusp of the paid divisions in November 2012, where a decent 4–3 record at makushita 4 would finally gain him entry to the jūryō division for the following January 2013 tournament.

Upon promotion to jūryō, he would have been allowed his own private room in his stable, but he chose to continue using the communal room he shared because it would be a "hassle" to have to move back out again if he was demoted. He also continued to do his share of stable chores that would have normally been done by a lower ranked wrestler once he became a sekitori. In contrast to his performance in previous divisions, his first trip up the ranks of jūryō was quite quick and in only a year he had risen to the top flight makuuchi division. During his rise through jūryō he was in contention for the championship. In September 2013, future ōzeki and fellow Mongolian Terunofuji beat him on the final day to force a subsequent playoff between them. Terunofuji also won the following playoff bout to take the championship. If Kagamiō had won the championship he would have received the certificate of merit for the championship from his own coach, who was the head of the judging team for that tournament. He also said in later interviews that he had hoped to use his championship interview as a chance to make an entreaty for aspiring wrestlers to join his small stable. However, this was not to be. Regardless of this, one more solid performance at 10–5 in the jūryō 1 rank would garner him promotion to the top flight makuuchi division for the January 2014 tournament. He entered the top division at the same time as fellow Mongolian Takanoiwa, who was also promoted from jūryō 1.

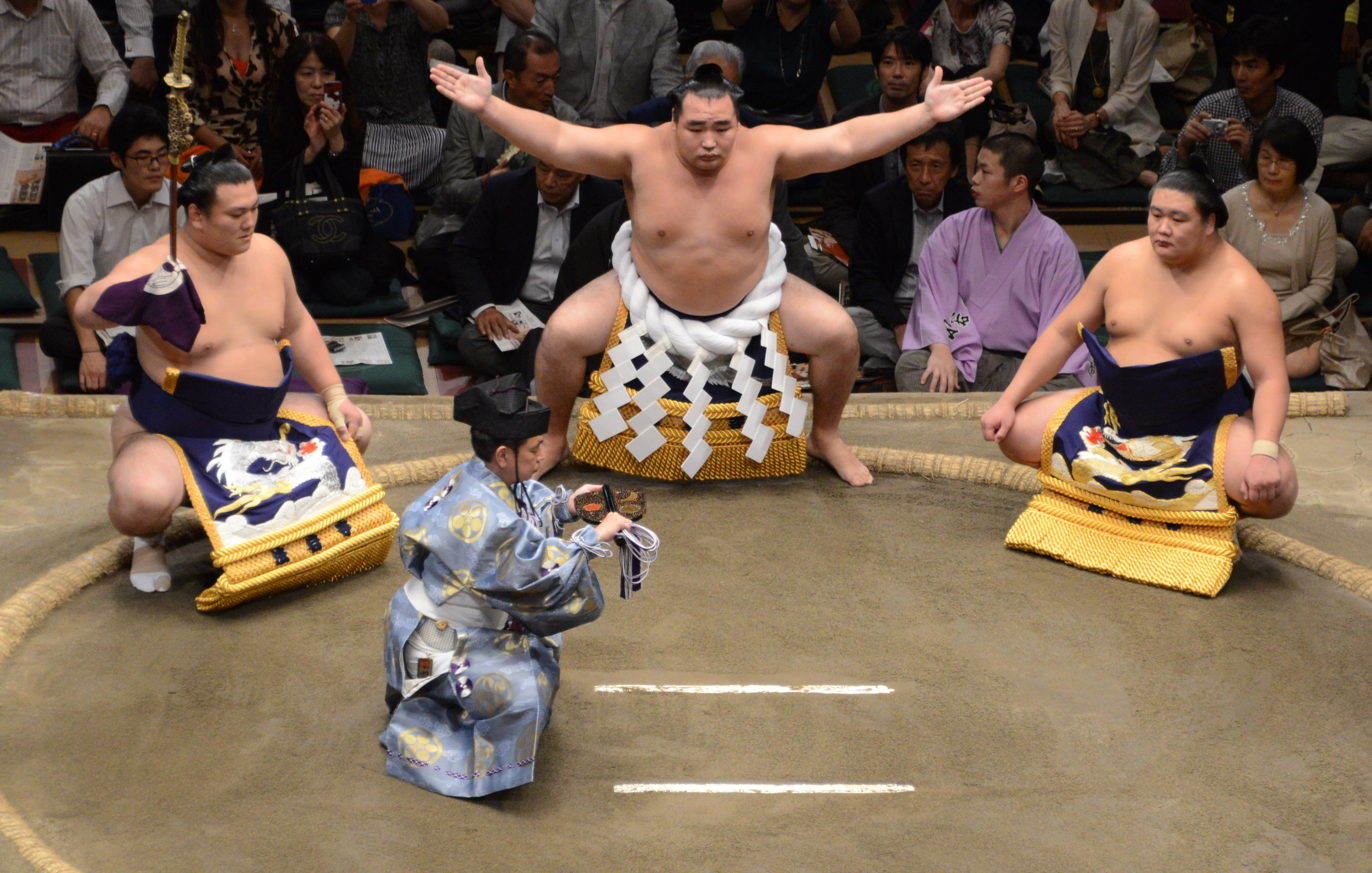
Kagamiō (right) as an attendant in Kakuryū's dohyō-iri ceremony in September 2014

Kagamiō was the first wrestler from Kagamiyama stable to make the top division since his coach took control of it seventeen years previously. At the time he was also the second longest to reach makuuchi among foreign born wrestlers, at 62 tournament from his professional debut. In an interview about his promotion, talking about his lengthy rise, he happily joked, "for me it felt quite quick, I thought it was going to take me 15 years." During the interview he also announced his engagement to his Mongolian girlfriend. However, his makuuchi performance was lackluster. In one of his relegation trips back to jūryō in May 2015, he was involved in yet another championship playoff round. In it, he won a preliminary playoff bout against Mongolian Seirō only to lose the following final playoff bout to another Mongolian, the up and comer and future sekiwake Ichinojō, who he had previously defeated on the 9th day of the tournament. Despite his championship playoff loss, his regular tournament record of 11–4 at the rank of jūryō 1 was still enough for him to achieve makuuchi re-promotion for the July 2014 tournament, though two consecutive losing tournaments would put him right back in jūryō In this, his third relegation to jūryō, in March 2015, he only managed a 4–11 at jūryō 1. However, in the following May tournament, at jūryō 9 he posted an impressive 12–3 record, beating Hidenoumi on the last day to avoid a playoff, and finally taking the championship on his third chance. His record and championship earned him his fourth promotion to the top division for the July tournament in Nagoya. There he finally achieved a majority of wins or kachi-koshi in the top division, but he only managed four wins in the following tournament in September 2015 and was demoted back to jūryō for the fourth time. In May 2016 he was injured in a match with Tenkaihō and had to withdraw from the tournament, falling to makushita as a result. In September 2017 he won the makushita division championship with a perfect 7–0 record. Following more injury problems he fell to the sandanme division in July 2018, but he won the championship there with an undefeated 7–0 score. In October it was announced that he was changing his shikona given name from Nanji to Hideoki. Continuing injury problems saw him pull out of five successive tournaments between July 2020 and March 2021 and fall from makushita to the jonidan division. He transferred to the Isenoumi stable following Kagamiyama stable's closure after the July 2021 tournament, but his continued absence from competition meant he fell off the banzuke completely in September 2021.

Kagamiō's retirement was confirmed by the Sumo Association at the end of March 2023. His retirement ceremony took place on 10 June 2023, in a reception room at the Ryōgoku Kokugikan and about 270 people took part in the hair-cutting ceremony. After his retirement, Kagamiō became a businessman, making various investments in different fields such as catering and building renovation.

== Fighting style ==
Kagamiō was a yotsu-sumo wrestler who favours grappling techniques as opposed to pushing and slapping his opponent. His preferred grip on his opponent's mawashi was migi-yotsu, a left hand outside, right hand inside position. He regularly used his left hand outside grip to win by uwate-nage, or overarm throw. However his most common winning kimarite was yori-kiri, a straightforward force out.

== Career record ==
Kagamiō Hideoki
Year	January Hatsu basho, Tokyo	March Haru basho, Osaka	May Natsu basho, Tokyo	July Nagoya basho, Nagoya	September Aki basho, Tokyo	November Kyūshū basho, Fukuoka
2003	x	x	x	(Maezumo)	East Jonokuchi #37; 4–3	West Jonidan #114; 3–4
2004	East Jonokuchi #5; 6–1	East Jonidan #39; 3–4	East Jonidan #57; 4–3	East Jonidan #34; 3–4	East Jonidan #56; 4–3	West Jonidan #32; 3–4
2005	East Jonidan #55; 5–2	West Jonidan #11; 5–2	East Sandanme #76; 3–4	West Sandanme #88; 3–4	West Jonidan #10; 4–3	East Sandanme #93; 5–2
2006	East Sandanme #58; 4–3	West Sandanme #43; 5–2	East Sandanme #16; 4–3	East Sandanme #4; 1–6	West Sandanme #42; 4–3	West Sandanme #26; 2–5
2007	East Sandanme #52; 4–3	West Sandanme #35; 4–3	East Sandanme #22; 4–3	West Sandanme #10; 3–4	East Sandanme #26; 3–4	West Sandanme #40; 3–4
2008	East Sandanme #55; 5–2	West Sandanme #28; 3–4	East Sandanme #42; 6–1	East Makushita #55; 2–5	East Sandanme #16; 6–1	West Makushita #40; 2–5
2009	West Makushita #59; 3–4	East Sandanme #14; 5–2	East Makushita #50; 5–2	West Makushita #29; 4–3	West Makushita #23; 3–3–1	West Makushita #30; 2–5
2010	East Makushita #46; 5–2	West Makushita #34; 2–5	West Makushita #50; 5–2	West Makushita #33; 4–3	East Makushita #25; 4–3	East Makushita #18; 5–2
2011	West Makushita #9; 1–6	Tournament Cancelled; 0–0–0	West Makushita #28; 3–4	West Makushita #28; 2–5	West Makushita #42; 6–1	East Makushita #17; 4–3
2012	West Makushita #12; 3–4	East Makushita #18; 5–2	East Makushita #11; 5–2	East Makushita #7; 3–4	East Makushita #10; 4–3	West Makushita #4; 4–3
2013	East Jūryō #14; 8–7	West Jūryō #12; 7–8	West Jūryō #13; 12–3	East Jūryō #4; 6–9	West Jūryō #8; 12–3–P	East Jūryō #1; 10–5
2014	East Maegashira #14; 6–9	East Maegashira #16; 5–10	West Jūryō #2; 11–4–PP	West Maegashira #14; 6–9	West Maegashira #16; 6–9	West Jūryō #1; 9–6
2015	West Maegashira #15; 7–8	East Jūryō #1; 4–11	East Jūryō #9; 12–3; Champion	West Maegashira #14; 9–6	West Maegashira #9; 4–11	West Jūryō #1; 6–9
2016	West Jūryō #4; 7–7–1	West Jūryō #5; 4–11	West Jūryō #12; 1–6–8	East Makushita #9; 2–5	West Makushita #25; 2–4–1	West Makushita #40; 6–1
2017	West Makushita #17; 2–5	East Makushita #35; 4–3	West Makushita #28; 3–4	West Makushita #39; 3–4	West Makushita #49; 7–0; Champion	West Makushita #5; 2–5
2018	West Makushita #14; 4–3	East Makushita #10; 1–2–4	East Makushita #31; Sat out due to injury 0–0–7	West Sandanme #11; 7–0–P; Champion	East Makushita #12; 5–2	West Makushita #4; 2–5
2019	East Makushita #12; 2–5	West Makushita #25; 2–4–1	East Makushita #40; 3–2–2	East Makushita #49; 5–2	West Makushita #36; 4–3	East Makushita #31; 4–3
2020	West Makushita #24; 3–4	West Makushita #31; 4–3	West Makushita #25; Tournament Cancelled; 0–0–0	West Makushita #25; 1–4–2	West Makushita #43; Sat out due to injury 0–0–7	West Sandanme #23; 0–3–4
2021	West Sandanme #73; Sat out due to injury 0–0–7	West Jonidan #33; 0–1–6	West Jonidan #103; Sat out due to injury 0–0–7	East Jonokuchi #18; Sat out due to injury 0–0–7	(Banzukegai)	(Banzukegai)
2022	(Banzukegai)	(Banzukegai)	(Banzukegai)	(Banzukegai)	(Banzukegai)	(Banzukegai)
2023	(Banzukegai)	Banzuke-gai; Retired –	x	x	x	x
Record given as wins–losses–absences Top division champion Top division runner-up Retired Lower divisions Non-participation Sanshō key: F=Fighting spirit; O=Outstanding performance; T=Technique Also shown: ★=Kinboshi; P=Playoff(s); Divisions: Makuuchi — Jūryō — Makushita — Sandanme — Jonidan — Jonokuchi Makuuchi ranks: Yokozuna — Ōzeki — Sekiwake — Komusubi — Maegashira

== See also ==
- Glossary of sumo terms
- List of past sumo wrestlers
- List of Mongolian sumo wrestlers
- List of non-Japanese sumo wrestlers
- List of sumo second division champions
