= Kitakachidoki Hayato =

Japanese sumo wrestler

Personal information
- Native name: 北勝鬨 準人
- Born: Hayato Kuga; 1 January 1966 (age 60) Obihiro, Hokkaidō, Japan
- Height: 1.83 m (6 ft 0 in)
- Weight: 148 kg (326 lb)

Sport
- Sport: Sumo
- Retired: September, 2000
- Heya: Isenoumi
- Record: 708-731-22
- Debut: May, 1981
- Highest rank: Maegashira 3 (March, 1994)
- Elder name: Isenoumi
- Championships: 1 (Makushita)

Kitakachidoki Hayato (born 1 January 1966 as Hayato Kuga) is a former sumo wrestler from Obihiro, Hokkaidō, Japan. He made his professional debut in 1981, and reached the top division in 1989. His highest rank was maegashira 3. After retirement he became an elder in the Japan Sumo Association. He took over as head coach at Isenoumi stable, when former head coach Fujinokawa reached mandatory retirement age in September 2011.

== Career ==
He was born in Obihiro, the son of a lorry driver. At school he was a soccer goalkeeper. He made his professional debut in May 1981, recruited by Isenoumi stable. He won the makushita division championship in November 1986 with a perfect 7–0 record and was promoted to the sekitori ranks after that tournament. He had been using his family name of Kuga as his ring name, but upon his promotion he was given the shikona of Kitakachidoki, or "northern battle-cry," a reference to his Hokkaidō birthplace in the north of the country. He had few other wrestlers in his stable at a similar rank to him (former maegashira Hattori Yuji being forced to retire through injury around that time) and he had to go to other stables in his Tokitsukaze ichimon or stable group to find quality training partners.

He reached the top makuuchi division for the first time in January 1989, but was demoted back to the second juryo division after only one tournament. He did not establish himself as a top division regular until 1991. He fought in makuuchi for 49 tournaments in total, with a 331–389 win/loss record. He never managed to reach a sanyaku rank, his highest position in the banzuke being maegashira 3 in March 1994. He was also unable to defeat a yokozuna or win a special prize. His final appearance in the top division was in May 1998, although he continued to compete in the juryo division for two years after that. His demotion meant there were no longer any Hokkaidō natives in the top division, a remarkable decline considering that in the early 1990s there were three yokozuna (Chiyonofuji, Hokutoumi, and Onokuni) from Hokkaidō on the banzuke. It was not until May 2018, with the promotion of Kyokutaisei, that Hokkaidō Prefecture had another top division representative.

== Retirement from sumo ==
After a poor 5–10 record in July 2000, and facing certain demotion to the unsalaried makushita division, Kitakachidoki announced his retirement at the age of thirty four. He had fought in 1438 matches across 117 tournaments. On 22 August 2000 he became an elder in the Japan Sumo Association, acquiring the vacant elder name of Katsunora Oyakata. He worked as a coach at Isenoumi stable, and in September 2011 he took over as head of the stable when his old boss, former sekiwake Fujinokawa, reached the mandatory retirement age of 65. Now known as Isenoumi Oyakata, he oversaw the promotion of Ikioi to the top division in 2012, and Nishikigi in 2016. In March 2022 he was elected to the Japan Sumo Association's board of directors.

== Fighting style ==
His most common winning kimarite or technique was yori-kiri or force out, where he preferred a right hand inside grip (migi-yotsu) on his opponent's mawashi or belt. He was also fond of hip throws like sukui nage (scoop throw) and uwate nage (overarm throw). He was only of average height and weight for the top division but had a notably muscular frame as he was a keen weight-lifter.

== Career record ==
Kitakachidoki Hayato
Year	January Hatsu basho, Tokyo	March Haru basho, Osaka	May Natsu basho, Tokyo	July Nagoya basho, Nagoya	September Aki basho, Tokyo	November Kyūshū basho, Fukuoka
1981	x	x	(Maezumo)	East Jonokuchi #31; 5–2	East Jonidan #121; 4–3	East Jonidan #97; 5–2
1982	East Jonidan #59; 4–3	West Jonidan #35; 2–5	West Jonidan #60; 6–1	West Sandanme #85; 5–2	East Sandanme #50; 4–3	East Sandanme #28; 4–3
1983	East Sandanme #16; 1–6	East Sandanme #51; Sat out due to injury 0–0–7	West Jonidan #12; 6–1	West Sandanme #44; 4–3	East Sandanme #28; 3–4	East Sandanme #44; 4–3
1984	East Sandanme #33; 2–5	West Sandanme #61; 6–1	East Sandanme #13; 5–2	East Makushita #48; 4–3	West Makushita #33; 3–4	West Makushita #46; 5–2
1985	West Makushita #26; 5–2	West Makushita #12; 3–4	East Makushita #19; 3–4	East Makushita #31; 3–4	West Makushita #39; 5–2	West Makushita #23; 4–3
1986	East Makushita #13; 5–2	West Makushita #6; 2–5	West Makushita #21; 4–3	West Makushita #15; 4–3	East Makushita #10; 6–1	East Makushita #2; 7–0; Champion
1987	West Jūryō #9; 9–6	West Jūryō #6; 9–6	West Jūryō #5; 8–7	West Jūryō #4; 7–8	East Jūryō #6; 8–7	East Jūryō #4; 7–8
1988	West Jūryō #5; 8–7	East Jūryō #3; 6–9	East Jūryō #8; 8–7	West Jūryō #4; 6–9	East Jūryō #9; 9–6	East Jūryō #4; 10–5
1989	East Maegashira #13; 6–9	West Jūryō #2; 9–6	West Maegashira #13; 8–7	West Maegashira #10; 5–10	West Jūryō #1; 9–6	West Maegashira #13; 6–9
1990	West Jūryō #1; 10–5	East Maegashira #13; 6–9	East Jūryō #2; 7–8	West Jūryō #3; 6–9	East Jūryō #7; 8–7	West Jūryō #3; 8–7
1991	West Maegashira #14; 8–7	West Maegashira #10; 7–8	East Maegashira #13; 5–10	West Jūryō #1; 8–7	West Maegashira #13; 8–7	West Maegashira #9; 9–6
1992	East Maegashira #4; 6–9	West Maegashira #7; 6–9	West Maegashira #10; 8–7	West Maegashira #7; 7–8	West Maegashira #9; 8–7	East Maegashira #5; 7–8
1993	West Maegashira #7; 7–8	West Maegashira #8; 8–7	West Maegashira #4; Sat out due to injury 0–0–15	West Maegashira #4; 5–10	East Maegashira #9; 6–9	East Maegashira #14; 9–6
1994	West Maegashira #8; 8–7	West Maegashira #3; 6–9	West Maegashira #5; 6–9	East Maegashira #8; 7–8	West Maegashira #10; 7–8	East Maegashira #13; 9–6
1995	West Maegashira #7; 7–8	East Maegashira #10; 7–8	East Maegashira #12; 9–6	East Maegashira #5; 4–11	East Maegashira #12; 8–7	East Maegashira #10; 8–7
1996	West Maegashira #6; 5–10	East Maegashira #12; 9–6	East Maegashira #4; 4–11	East Maegashira #9; 8–7	West Maegashira #4; 4–11	West Maegashira #9; 8–7
1997	West Maegashira #5; 6–9	East Maegashira #7; 6–9	West Maegashira #11; 7–8	West Maegashira #13; 7–8	West Maegashira #14; 8–7	West Maegashira #11; 8–7
1998	West Maegashira #10; 7–8	East Maegashira #13; 8–7	East Maegashira #11; 5–10	East Jūryō #1; 4–11	East Jūryō #7; 7–8	West Jūryō #9; 8–7
1999	East Jūryō #8; 8–7	East Jūryō #2; 3–12	West Jūryō #9; 10–5	West Jūryō #3; 8–7	West Jūryō #1; 7–8	West Jūryō #2; 5–10
2000	West Jūryō #5; 9–6	East Jūryō #3; 6–9	West Jūryō #5; 4–11	East Jūryō #10; 5–10	East Makushita #3; Retired –	x
Record given as wins–losses–absences Top division champion Top division runner-up Retired Lower divisions Non-participation Sanshō key: F=Fighting spirit; O=Outstanding performance; T=Technique Also shown: ★=Kinboshi; P=Playoff(s); Divisions: Makuuchi — Jūryō — Makushita — Sandanme — Jonidan — Jonokuchi Makuuchi ranks: Yokozuna — Ōzeki — Sekiwake — Komusubi — Maegashira

== See also ==
- Glossary of sumo terms
- List of past sumo wrestlers
- List of sumo elders
