= Hattori Yūji =

Sumo wrestler (1960–2025)

Personal information
- Native name: 服部 祐兒
- Born: Yūji Hattori; 20 August 1960 Ōbu, Aichi Prefecture, Japan
- Died: 6 June 2025 (aged 64)
- Height: 1.93 m (6 ft 4 in)
- Weight: 150 kg (330 lb)

Sport
- Sport: Sumo
- University team: Doshisha University
- Retired: July 1987
- Heya: Isenoumi
- Record: 169-166-22
- Debut: March 1983
- Highest rank: Maegashira 3 (July 1986)
- Championships: 1 (Makushita)
- Updated on Sep. 2012

Hattori Yūji (born Yūji Hattori; 20 August 1960 – 6 June 2025) was a Japanese sumo wrestler from Obu, Aichi. While an amateur at Doshisha University he won a then–record seventeen collegiate sumo titles. He joined Isenoumi stable and for a time used the prestigious shikona Fujinokawa, the fighting name of Isenoumi Oyakata, formerly sekiwake Fujinokawa Takeo. He made his professional debut in March 1983 and reached the top division in March 1985. However, he was very injury-prone and never made the san'yaku ranks, his highest rank being maegashira 3. He left the sumo world upon retirement from active competition in July 1987 at the age of just 26. Yūji later became a sumo commentator. He died from liver cancer on 6 June 2025, at the age of 64.

== Career record ==
Hattori Yūji
Year	January Hatsu basho, Tokyo	March Haru basho, Osaka	May Natsu basho, Tokyo	July Nagoya basho, Nagoya	September Aki basho, Tokyo	November Kyūshū basho, Fukuoka
1983	x	Makushita tsukedashi #60; 5–2	West Makushita #35; 7–0; Champion	East Makushita #2; 4–3	West Jūryō #13; 9–6	East Jūryō #7; 8–7
1984	West Jūryō #4; 8–7	West Jūryō #2; 7–8	East Jūryō #5; 10–5	East Jūryō #1; 6–9	East Jūryō #5; 10–5	East Jūryō #3; 8–7
1985	West Jūryō #1; 9–6	East Maegashira #14; 8–7	West Maegashira #10; 8–7	East Maegashira #6; 6–9	West Maegashira #10; 8–7	East Maegashira #5; 5–10
1986	East Maegashira #13; 10–5	East Maegashira #7; 7–8	East Maegashira #9; 9–6	East Maegashira #3; 5–10	West Maegashira #8; 6–9	West Maegashira #11; 3–12
1987	West Jūryō #4; Sat out due to injury 0–0–15	East Makushita #2; 2–5	West Makushita #17; 1–6	West Makushita #43; Retired; 0–0–7	x	x
Record given as wins–losses–absences Top division champion Top division runner-up Retired Non-participation Jūryō Lower divisions Sanshō key: F=Fighting spirit; O=Outstanding performance; T=Technique Also shown: ★=Kinboshi; P=Playoff(s); Divisions: Makuuchi — Jūryō — Makushita — Sandanme — Jonidan — Jonokuchi Makuuchi ranks: Yokozuna — Ōzeki — Sekiwake — Komusubi — Maegashira

== See also ==
- Glossary of sumo terms
- List of past sumo wrestlers
