= Konuma Katsuyuki =

Japanese sumo wrestler

Personal information
- Native name: 小沼 克行
- Born: Katsuyuki Konuma; 14 August 1955 (age 71) Kasukabe, Saitama, Japan
- Height: 1.81 m (5 ft 11 1/2 in)
- Weight: 130 kg (290 lb; 20 st)

Sport
- Sport: Sumo
- Retired: November, 1978
- Heya: Kagamiyama
- Record: 195-151-59
- Debut: July, 1971
- Highest rank: Maegashira 9 (May, 1976)
- Championships: 1 (Jūryō)
- Updated on Sep. 2012

Konuma Katsuyuki (born 14 August 1955 as Katsuyuki Konuma) is a former sumo wrestler from Kasukabe, Saitama, Japan. He made his professional debut in July 1971, and reached the top division in March 1976. His highest rank was maegashira 9. He was a contemporary of Chiyonofuji, and the second man after him born in the Shōwa 30s (1955–1964) to reach the top division. He was talked of as a future yokozuna candidate and the "new Kitanoumi" but after breaking his leg in May 1976 his career never recovered. He retired from active competition in November 1978 at the age of just 23, due partly to the effects of his injury but also to a breakdown in relations with his stablemaster Kagamiyama, former yokozuna Kashiwado. After leaving sumo he ran a restaurant in his hometown of Kasukabe. His relationship with Kagamiyama later improved enough for the latter to attend his wedding ceremony.

== Career record ==
Konuma Katsuyuki
| Year | January Hatsu basho, Tokyo | March Haru basho, Osaka | May Natsu basho, Tokyo | July Nagoya basho, Nagoya | September Aki basho, Tokyo | November Kyūshū basho, Fukuoka |
|---|---|---|---|---|---|---|
| 1971 | x | x | x | (Maezumo) | West Jonokuchi #3; 5–2 | East Jonidan #52; 6–1–P |
| 1972 | West Jonidan #2; Sat out due to injury 0–0–7 | West Jonidan #46; Sat out due to injury 0–0–7 | West Jonidan #90; 6–1 | West Jonidan #25; 5–2 | West Sandanme #71; 3–4 | East Jonidan #2; 6–1 |
| 1973 | West Sandanme #33; 4–3 | West Sandanme #22; 4–3 | West Sandanme #15; 5–2 | East Makushita #52; 4–3 | East Makushita #43; 4–3 | East Makushita #38; 5–2 |
| 1974 | West Makushita #20; 1–6 | West Makushita #41; 5–2 | West Makushita #20; 5–2 | East Makushita #10; 4–3 | East Makushita #8; 4–3 | East Makushita #6; 4–3 |
| 1975 | East Makushita #5; 5–2 | East Makushita #2; 4–3 | East Makushita #1; 6–1 | East Jūryō #11; 8–7 | East Jūryō #10; 7–8 | East Jūryō #11; 9–6 |
| 1976 | East Jūryō #5; 11–4; Champion | East Maegashira #14; 9–6 | East Maegashira #9; 1–3–11 | West Jūryō #5; Sat out due to injury 0–0–15 | West Jūryō #5; Sat out due to injury 0–0–15 | East Makushita #2; 3–4 |
| 1977 | West Makushita #6; 4–3 | East Makushita #4; 4–3 | East Makushita #3; 4–3 | East Jūryō #13; 9–6 | East Jūryō #9; 8–7 | West Jūryō #5; 8–7 |
| 1978 | West Jūryō #2; 3–8–4 | East Jūryō #9; 4–11 | East Makushita #3; 3–4 | West Makushita #7; 3–4 | West Makushita #13; 2–5 | West Makushita #34; Retired; 0–0–7 |
Record given as wins–losses–absences Top division champion Top division runner-up Retired Lower divisions Non-participation Sanshō key: F=Fighting spirit; O=Outstanding performance; T=Technique Also shown: ★=Kinboshi; P=Playoff(s); Divisions: Makuuchi — Jūryō — Makushita — Sandanme — Jonidan — Jonokuchi Makuuchi ranks: Yokozuna — Ōzeki — Sekiwake — Komusubi — Maegashira

== See also ==
- Glossary of sumo terms
- List of past sumo wrestlers
- List of sumo tournament second division champions
