= Kagamiyama stable =

Defunct sumo stable

Coordinates: 35.7125°N 139.8678°E

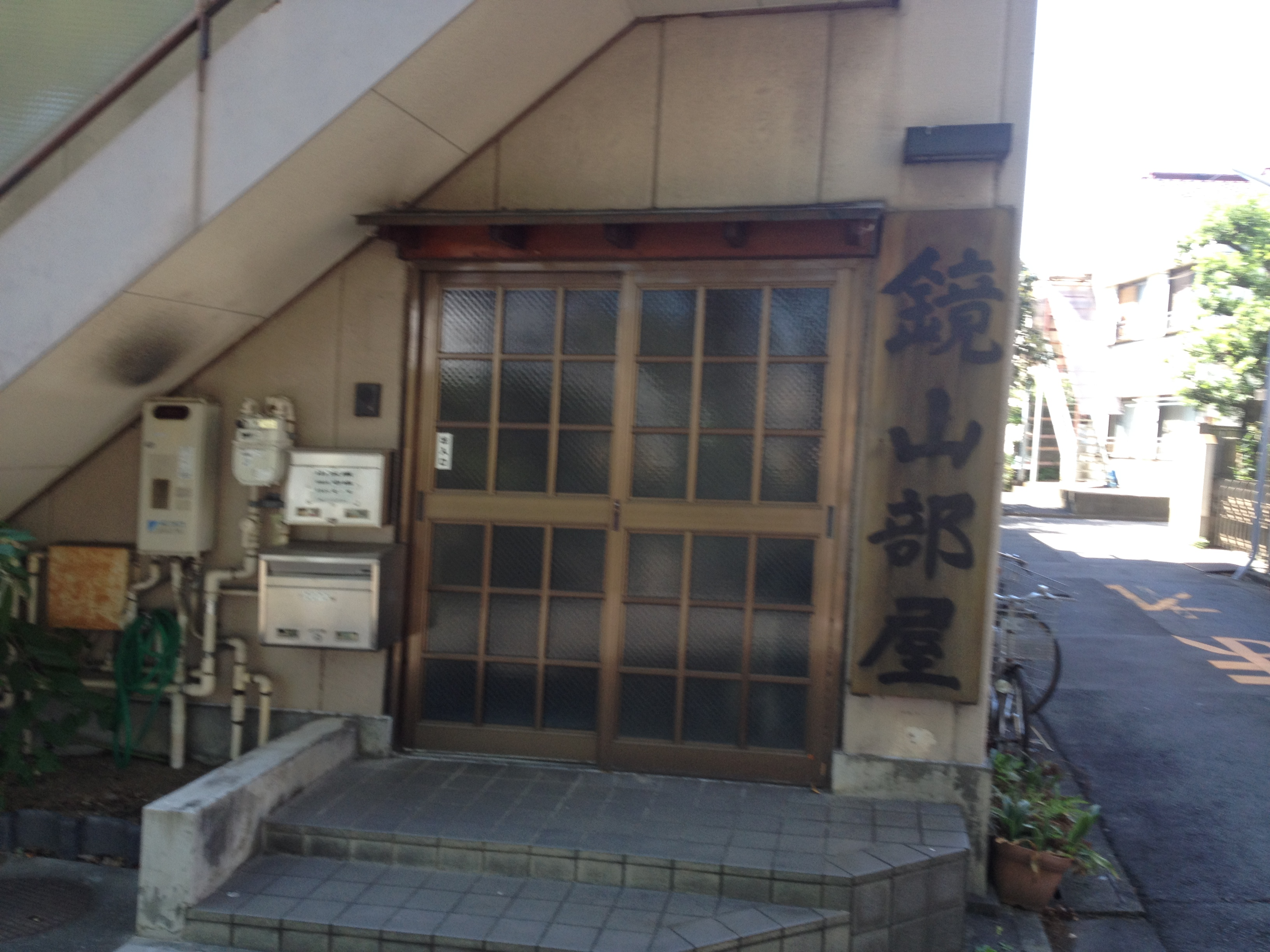
The stable entrance in 2014

Kagamiyama stable (鏡山部屋, Kagamiyama-beya) (1970–2021) was a sumo stable of the Tokitsukaze group.

It was set up in November 1970 by former yokozuna Kashiwado, who branched off from the Isenoumi stable. Upon his death in December 1996 the stable passed to his protégé, sekiwake Tagaryū. For many years it had just two wrestlers, one of them Tagaryū's son Ryūsei, making it the smallest active stable. It was decided at a Japan Sumo Association board meeting on July 21, 2021 that it would close immediately with all its personnel transferring to Isenoumi stable.

== Ring name conventions ==
Many wrestlers at this stable have taken ring names or shikona that include the character 竜 (read: ryū), meaning dragon, in deference to their coach and the stable's owner, the former Tagaryū.

== Owners ==
- 1996–2021: 8th Kagamiyama Shōji (riji, sekiwake Tagaryū)
- 1970–1996: 7th Kagamiyama Tsuyoshi (47th yokozuna), Kashiwado)

== Coach ==
- Katsunoura Toshirō (iin, maegashira Kirinishiki)

== Notable former members ==
- Kirinishiki (maegashira)
- Konuma (maegashira)
- Zaōnishiki (maegashira)

== Location and access ==
Tokyo, Katsushika Ward, Shin-Koiwa 3-28-21
15 minute walk from Shin-Koiwa Station on Sōbu Line

== See also ==
- List of sumo stables
- List of sumo elders
- List of active sumo wrestlers
- List of past sumo wrestlers
- List of years in sumo
- Glossary of sumo terms
