= Fujinokawa Takeo =

Sumo wrestler

Personal information
- Native name: 藤ノ川 武雄
- Born: Takeo Morita; 26 September 1946 (age 80) Otofuke, Hokkaidō, Japan
- Height: 1.78 m (5 ft 10 in)
- Weight: 108 kg (238 lb)

Sport
- Sport: Sumo
- Retired: November, 1972
- Heya: Isenoumi
- Record: 403-378-31
- Debut: May, 1961
- Highest rank: Sekiwake (May 1967)
- Elder name: Katsunoura
- Championships: 1 (Makushita)
- Special Prizes: Fighting spirit (2); Outstanding performance (1); Technique (4)
- Gold Stars: 4 Sadanoyama; Taihō; Kitanofuji; Tamanoumi
- Updated on June 2020

Fujinokawa Takeo (born 26 September 1946 as Takeo Morita) is a former sumo wrestler from Otofuke, Hokkaido, Japan. He made his professional debut in May 1961 and reached a highest rank of sekiwake in May 1967. He was a runner-up in two top division (makuuchi) tournaments, finishing three wins behind Tamanoshima in May 1968 and losing a playoff to ozeki Kiyokuni in July 1969. He earned four kinboshi for defeating yokozuna and won seven special prizes. After his retirement in 1972 at the age of 26 he became an elder of the Japan Sumo Association and took over as head coach of Isenoumi stable in 1982. He left the Sumo Association in 2011 upon reaching 65 years of age.

== Career ==
He joined professional sumo upon graduating from Takushoku University Daiichi High School in 1961. He initially wrestled under his own surname, Morita. He won the makushita division championship or yusho in November 1965 with a perfect 7–0 record. He reached the juryo division in January 1966 and the top makuuchi division in November 1966, one of the first wrestlers born after World War II to achieve this. One of his stablemates at Isenoumi stable was yokozuna Kashiwado Tsuyoshi. In just his third top division tournament March 1967 he defeated a yokozuna, earning his first kinboshi, won two special prizes for Outstanding Performance and Technique, and scored 12 wins against three losses. He was rewarded with promotion to the sanyaku ranks for the first time, at sekiwake. He was demoted after one tournament after scoring only 7–8 and only made the rank one more time in 1970, although he was ranked at komusubi on several other occasions. He was runner-up in two tournaments, in May 1968 (although he only scored 10–5) and July 1969 (after losing a play-off to Kiyokuni after both had finished on 12–3). He was popular with sumo fans and was nicknamed "Ima-Ushiwaka", a reference to the samurai warrior Minamoto no Yoshitsune.

On the sixth day of the July 1971 he suffered an injury to his left leg in a match with Yoshinohana, which led to him withdrawing from the tournament and being demoted to the juryo division. He felt he had to return to action in the next tournament to win back his rank despite not being fully healed, and withdrew again. It was partly in response to his slump in form due to his injury that the Sumo Association introduced the kosho seido or public injury system, whereby a wrestler injured in competition could sit out the next tournament without an effect on his rank. Fujinokawa did eventually manage to return to the top division in July 1972 but withdrew once again during the following tournament in September 1972 and never fought again.

== Retirement from sumo ==
He retired in November 1972 at the age of just 26, and after working as an assistant coach for some years under the elder name Tatekawa, he became Isenoumi Oyakata and head coach of the Isenoumi stable in December 1982 upon the death of the previous head, former maegashira Kashiwado. He produced the top division wrestlers Kitakachidoki, Tosanoumi and Ōikari. In February 2002 he was elected to the board of directors of the Japan Sumo Association. He commented about the suspension of Asashōryū in August 2007. He apologized to Japan's vice sports minister Kenshiro Matsunami on behalf of the Sumo Association over the case of Jun'ichi Yamamoto in February 2008. He also worked as the head of the Sumo Association's general planning department, looking after the health of the wrestlers, and he has warned that their increasing size and reliance on training machines instead of traditional head-to-head kawaigari training has made them more susceptible to injury. He stood down from the board in February 2010. He was responsible for developing in 2011 questionnaires to assess the wrestlers' fighting spirit that are handed out to the public on tournament match days. On September 25, 2011, NHK's live sumo broadcast contained coverage of Isenoumi-oyakata's retirement press conference. He announced that he would be turning 65 the following day and thereby reach the mandatory retirement age of a sumo coach. He named his replacement as head coach as Katsunoura-oyakata, the former Kitakachidoki.

In March 2018 he was appointed as a hyōgiin or outside voter in the Sumo Association, although he has no oyakata status.

In July 2025, his shikona Fujinokawa was passed down to Fujinokawa Seigō, the son of one of the coaches at Isenoumi stable. In September 2026, he also attended one of his matches, revealing that he had been receiving calls from his junior and that he was pleased with his performance.

== Career record ==
Fujinokawa Takeo
Year	January Hatsu basho, Tokyo	March Haru basho, Osaka	May Natsu basho, Tokyo	July Nagoya basho, Nagoya	September Aki basho, Tokyo	November Kyūshū basho, Fukuoka
1961	x	x	(Maezumo)	East Jonokuchi #21; 3–4	East Jonokuchi #9; 5–2	West Jonidan #25; 5–2
1962	West Sandanme #95; 4–3	East Sandanme #75; 5–2	East Sandanme #40; 3–4	West Sandanme #44; 3–4	West Sandanme #57; 4–3	East Sandanme #44; 5–2
1963	East Sandanme #14; 5–2	East Makushita #74; 4–3	West Makushita #70; 3–4	West Makushita #73; 3–4	West Makushita #82; 2–5	East Makushita #95; 5–2
1964	East Makushita #74; 6–1	East Makushita #43; 6–1	East Makushita #25; 3–4	West Makushita #27; 5–2	West Makushita #18; 4–3	East Makushita #16; 5–2
1965	West Makushita #7; 2–5	East Makushita #19; 3–4	West Makushita #22; 6–1	East Makushita #7; 3–4	West Makushita #10; 4–3	East Makushita #7; 7–0; Champion
1966	West Jūryō #13; 9–6	West Jūryō #7; 7–8	East Jūryō #8; 7–8	West Jūryō #9; 10–5	East Jūryō #2; 10–5	East Maegashira #13; 9–6
1967	East Maegashira #6; 8–7	East Maegashira #4; 12–3; TO★	West Sekiwake #1; 7–8	West Komusubi #2; 2–13	East Maegashira #5; 8–7	East Maegashira #2; 3–12
1968	East Maegashira #11; 11–4	East Maegashira #3; 5–10	East Maegashira #5; 10–5; F	East Maegashira #1; 5–10	West Maegashira #4; 8–7	East Maegashira #4; 8–7
1969	West Maegashira #2; 9–6; T	West Komusubi #1; 8–7; T	West Komusubi #1; 3–12	East Maegashira #5; 12–3–P; TF	West Komusubi #1; 5–10	West Maegashira #2; 5–10 ★
1970	West Maegashira #6; 9–6	West Maegashira #1; 7–8	West Maegashira #2; 6–9	West Maegashira #3; 7–8 ★	East Maegashira #4; 9–6 ★	West Sekiwake #1; 4–11
1971	West Maegashira #2; 8–7	East Komusubi #1; 5–10	East Maegashira #2; 3–12	West Maegashira #9; 3–4–8	West Jūryō #3; 4–4–7	West Jūryō #7; 6–9
1972	East Jūryō #11; 8–7	West Jūryō #5; 10–5	West Jūryō #1; 10–5	East Maegashira #11; 8–7	East Maegashira #10; 2–5–8	East Jūryō #6; Retired –
Record given as wins–losses–absences Top division champion Top division runner-up Retired Lower divisions Non-participation Sanshō key: F=Fighting spirit; O=Outstanding performance; T=Technique Also shown: ★=Kinboshi; P=Playoff(s); Divisions: Makuuchi — Jūryō — Makushita — Sandanme — Jonidan — Jonokuchi Makuuchi ranks: Yokozuna — Ōzeki — Sekiwake — Komusubi — Maegashira

== See also ==
- Glossary of sumo terms
- List of past sumo wrestlers
- List of sekiwake
