= Isenoumi stable =

Organization of sumo wrestlers

Coordinates: 35.7257°N 139.7456°E

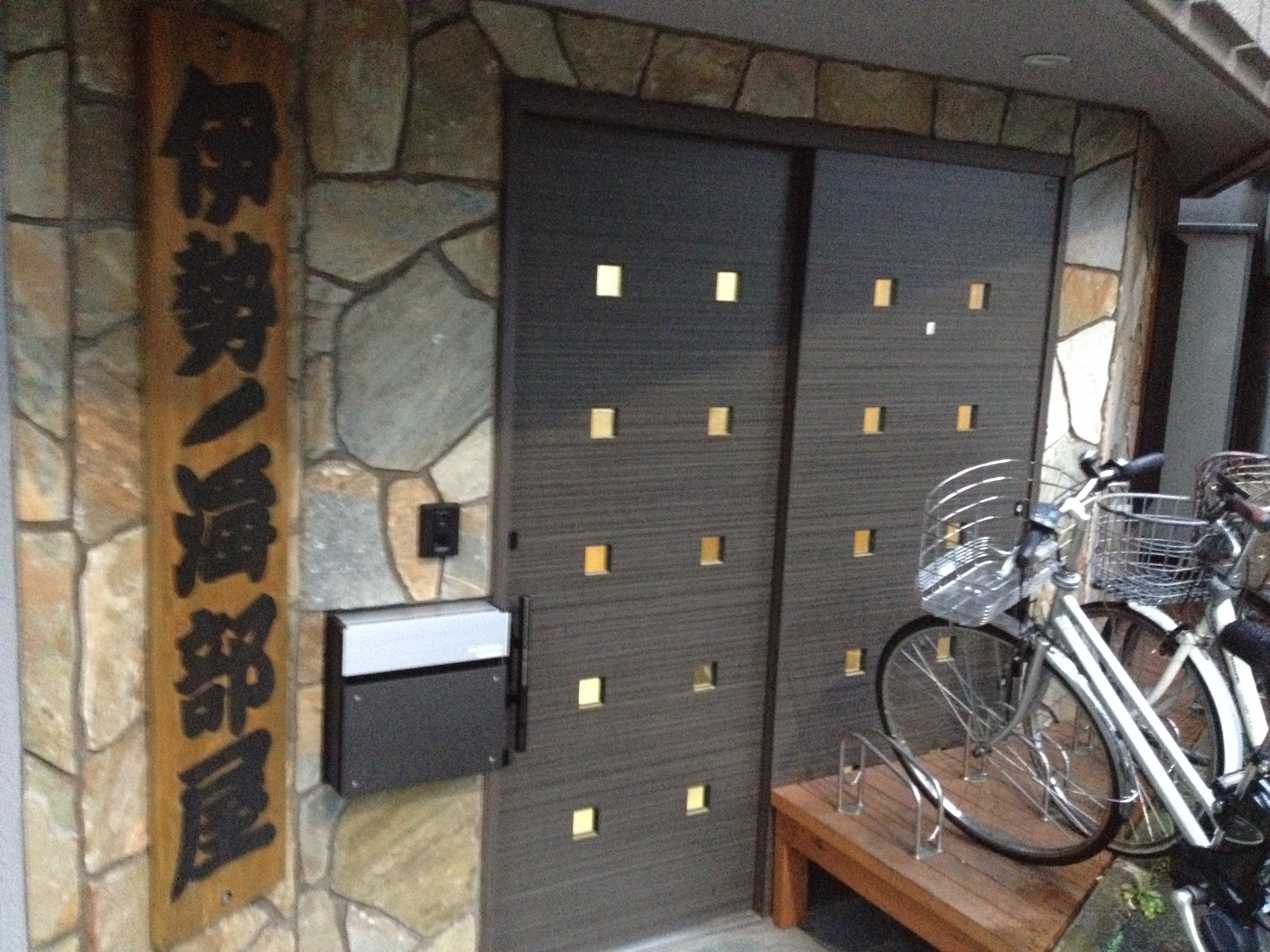

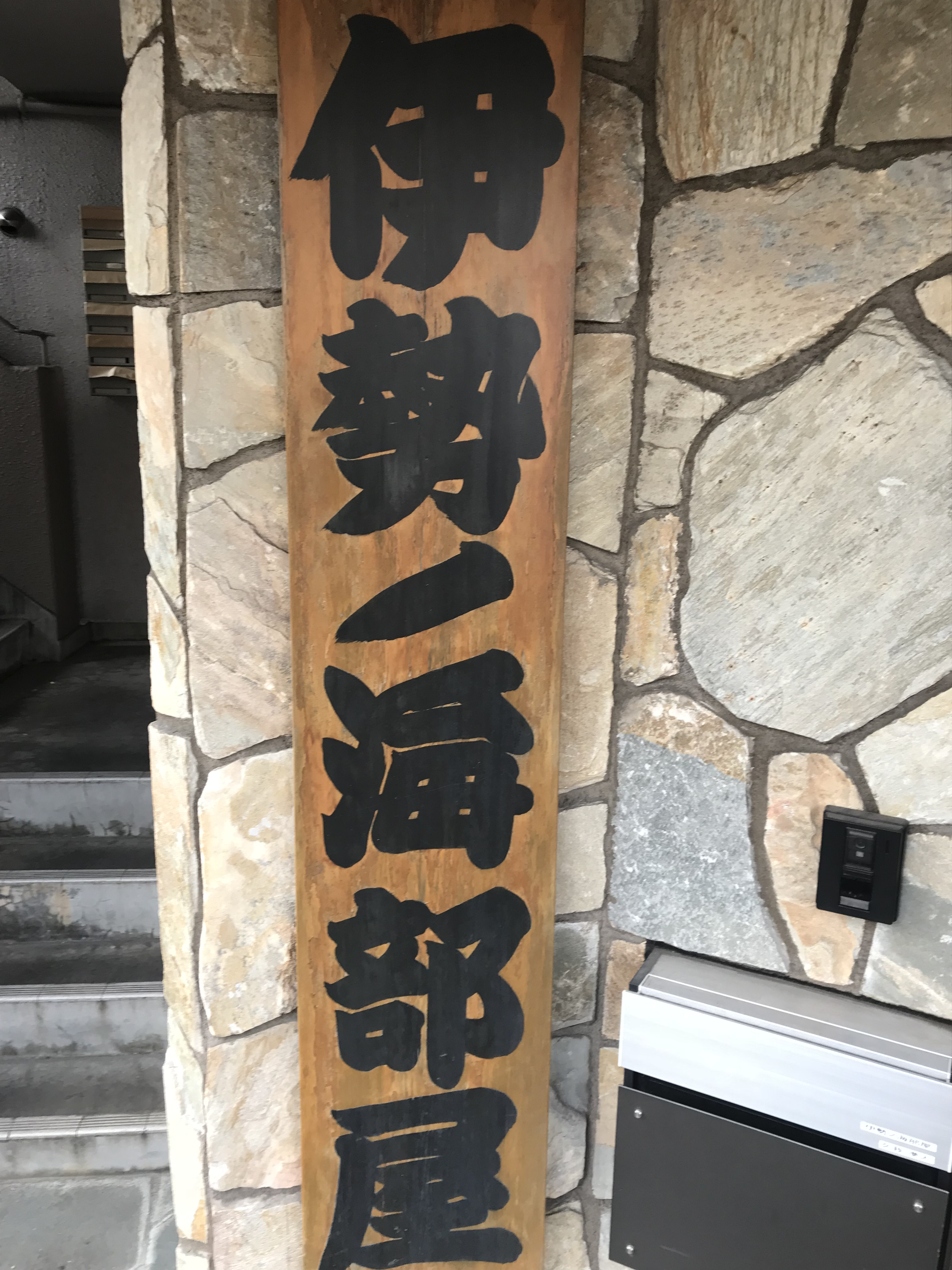

Isenoumi stable (伊勢ノ海部屋, Isenoumi-beya) is a stable of sumo wrestlers, part of the Tokitsukaze ichimon or group of stables. Its current head coach is former maegashira Kitakachidoki.

As of May 2026, the stable has 12 active wrestlers.

== History ==
The name of Isenoumi stable relates to one of the oldest elder names in sumo, dating back to the mid-eighteenth century. The legendary Tanikaze, one of the first yokozuna, and his protégé Raiden, arguably the greatest rikishi ever, were both members of the first stable to be named Isenoumi. Its current incarnation, however, dates from 1949. In the 1960s the stable produced yokozuna Kashiwado, who upon his retirement left to found Kagamiyama stable in 1970. In December 1982 former sekiwake Fujinokawa took charge of the stable.

The retirement of Tosanoumi in December 2010 briefly left Isenoumi stable without any sekitori for the first time since 1983, until Ikioi was promoted to the jūryō division a year later. The former Fujinokawa reached the mandatory retirement age of 65 in September 2011 and passed the stable to former maegashira Kitakachidoki. The stable was for a long time situated in Tokyo's Edogawa ward, and to help tackle the high crime rate in that area, the former Isenoumi instructed his wrestlers to go on night patrols, the first stable to do so. In April 2012 the stable moved to new facilities in Bunkyo ward.

The stable had a policy of not accepting foreign-born wrestlers or ex-university competitors, but the Mongolian Arauma joined in 2020.

In July 2021 it absorbed the small Kagamiyama stable, now down to just two wrestlers, which had originally branched off from it in 1970. In April 2024, the stable also absorbed one wrestler from the former Michinoku stable.

== Owners ==
- 2011–present: 12th Isenoumi Hayato (riji, maegashira Kitakachidoki, born 1966)
- 1982–2011: 11th Isenoumi Yukishige (sekiwake Fujinokawa, born 1946)
- 1949–1982: 10th Isenoumi Hirotake (maegashira Kashiwado, 1918–1982)

== Notable active wrestlers ==
- Fujinokawa (best rank sekiwake)
- Nishikigi (best rank komusubi)

== Coaches ==
- Katsunoura Toshiro (yakuin taigū iin, maegashira Kirinishiki, born 1962)
- Tatekawa Toshio (iin, sekiwake Tosanoumi, born 1972)
- Kabutoyama Tsuyoshi (iin, maegashira Ōikari, born 1972)
- Kasugayama Shōta (iin, sekiwake Ikioi, born 1986)
- Kagamiyama Shōji (san'yo, sekiwake Tagaryū, born 1958)

== Notable former members ==
- Kashiwado (the 47th yokozuna, 1938–1996)
- Hattori (maegashira 3, 1960–2025)
- Kagamiō (maegashira 9, born 1988)

== Hairdresser ==
- Tokomasa (first class tokoyama, born 1974)
- Tokoharu (second class tokoyama, born 1989)

== Location and access ==
Tokyo, Bunkyō ward, Sengoku 1-22-2
5 minute walk from Sengoku Station on the Toei Mita Line

== See also ==
- List of sumo stables
- List of active sumo wrestlers
- List of past sumo wrestlers
- Glossary of sumo terms
