= Tagaryū Shōji =

Japanese sumo wrestler

Personal information
- Native name: 多賀竜 昇司
- Born: 黒谷 昇 Noboru Kurotani; February 15, 1958 (age 68) Ibaraki, Japan
- Height: 1.78 m (5 ft 10 in)
- Weight: 142 kg (313 lb)

Sport
- Sport: Sumo
- Retired: May, 1991
- Heya: Kagamiyama
- Record: 561–621–10
- Debut: March, 1974
- Highest rank: Sekiwake (November, 1983)
- Elder name: Kagamiyama
- Championships: 1 (Makuuchi); 1 (Jūryō); 1 (Makushita); 1 (Sandanme)
- Special Prizes: Fighting Spirit (1); Technique (1)
- Gold Stars: 1 (Kitanoumi)
- Updated on June 2007

Tagaryū Shōji (Japanese: 多賀竜 昇司, born February 15, 1958) is a former sumo wrestler from Hitachi, Ibaraki Prefecture, Japan. The highest rank he reached was sekiwake. In 1984 he won a top division yūshō or tournament championship from the maegashira ranking. After retiring in 1991 he became a sumo coach and head of the Kagamiyama stable, as well as a director of the Japan Sumo Association.

== Career ==
Tagaryū made his professional debut in March 1974. It took him seven years to make the sekitori ranks, his promotion to the second highest jūryō division coming in January 1981. He reached the top makuuchi division in May 1982. He made his san'yaku debut at sekiwake rank in November 1983 but lasted only one tournament there and fell back to the maegashira ranks.

=== September 1984 Championship ===
At the September 1984 tournament, the last to be held at the Kuramae Kokugikan, Tagaryū was ranked maegashira 12 and knew that another make-koshi would leave him in danger of demotion from makuuchi altogether. Tagaryū started excellently, and the end of the middle day saw him the only wrestler with an eight-win clean sheet. Ōzeki Wakashimazu, who had won the previous tournament 15–0, had only lost one bout thus far. Tagaryū lost to maegashira Tochitsurugi on the ninth day. Wakashimazu lost to Konishiki on the eleventh day, leaving him with two losses. The penultimate day saw Tagaryū, with one loss, drawn against Wakashimazu with two. Tagaryū defeated the ōzeki by yoritaoshi, eliminating him from the title race. Tagaryū now stood on 13–1, one win ahead of Konishiki on 12–2. When Konishiki fell to Kotokaze on the final day, Tagaryū's subsequent loss to Asashio was immaterial. With thirteen wins and two losses, he was the tournament champion. He was the first winner from the maegashira ranks since Kaiketsu in 1976. In addition to the Emperor's Cup, he was awarded the Technique Prize and the Fighting Spirit Prize.

=== Later career ===
Following his tournament win Tagaryū was promoted to komusubi but turned in a losing score and was demoted. In the January 1985 tournament he defeated yokozuna Kitanoumi in what was the latter's last ever bout. This was to be Tagaryū's only kinboshi. After a series of unimpressive results he was demoted back to the jūryō division in July 1988 and promptly won the jūryō championship. He thereby became the second person (after Wakanami) to accomplish the somewhat dubious feat of capturing the tournament championship in the second division after winning it in the first. He retired in May 1991.

== Fighting style ==
Tagaryū preferred yotsu-sumo, or grappling techniques. His favoured grip on the opponent's mawashi was migi-yotsu, a left hand outside, right hand inside position. He also liked uwatenage, or overarm throw, and uwatedashinage, or pulling overarm throw. His most common winning kimarite was yori-kiri, the force out, used in about 40 percent of his victories.

== After retirement ==
Tagaryū has remained in the sumo world as an elder of the Japan Sumo Association. He became head coach of Kagamiyama stable in 1996 upon the death of his old coach in his days as an active wrestler, former yokozuna Kashiwado. His son Shōta, born in 1986, was a wrestler at the stable under the ring name Ryūsei, although he never went higher than the makushita division. The only other wrestler in the stable in its later years was the former maegashira Kagamiō. In February 2010 Kagamiyama was elected to the Sumo Association's board of Directors and he also served as a ringside judge. In March 2021 he stood down from his roles as head of compliance and head of crisis management due to ill-health. Kagamiyama stable shut down in July 2021 with its personnel transferring to the Isegahama stable.

== Career record ==
Tagaryū Shōji
| Year | January Hatsu basho, Tokyo | March Haru basho, Osaka | May Natsu basho, Tokyo | July Nagoya basho, Nagoya | September Aki basho, Tokyo | November Kyūshū basho, Fukuoka |
|---|---|---|---|---|---|---|
| 1974 | x | (Maezumo) | West Jonokuchi #12; 5–2 | East Jonidan #72; 4–3 | East Jonidan #50; 3–4 | West Jonidan #65; 5–2 |
| 1975 | West Jonidan #30; 3–4 | West Jonidan #42; 3–4 | East Jonidan #57; 5–2 | West Jonidan #18; 6–1 | East Sandanme #46; 3–4 | West Sandanme #58; 4–3 |
| 1976 | West Sandanme #42; 3–4 | West Sandanme #54; 4–3 | West Sandanme #40; 4–3 | West Sandanme #27; 6–1 | West Makushita #51; 4–3 | West Makushita #38; 0–7 |
| 1977 | East Sandanme #11; 4–3 | East Makushita #60; 2–5 | West Sandanme #24; 4–3 | East Sandanme #9; 2–5 | West Sandanme #33; 4–3 | East Sandanme #20; 4–3 |
| 1978 | East Sandanme #9; 1–3–3 | East Sandanme #39; 4–3 | West Sandanme #26; 4–3 | East Sandanme #13; 4–3 | West Sandanme #2; 7–0–P; Champion | West Makushita #12; 2–5 |
| 1979 | West Makushita #29; 4–3 | East Makushita #23; 3–4 | West Makushita #32; 2–5 | East Makushita #51; 5–2 | East Makushita #30; 5–2 | East Makushita #17; 4–3 |
| 1980 | West Makushita #11; 3–4 | East Makushita #20; 4–3 | West Makushita #15; 3–4 | West Makushita #20; 2–5 | West Makushita #40; 7–0; Champion | East Makushita #3; 5–2 |
| 1981 | West Jūryō #12; 3–12 | East Makushita #9; 6–1 | West Makushita #1; 4–3 | East Jūryō #13; 5–10 | West Makushita #4; 5–2 | East Jūryō #13; 9–6 |
| 1982 | West Jūryō #6; 9–6 | East Jūryō #1; 8–7 | East Maegashira #13; 8–7 | East Maegashira #9; 8–7 | East Maegashira #6; 7–8 | East Maegashira #7; 6–9 |
| 1983 | West Maegashira #9; 9–6 | West Maegashira #2; 3–12 | West Maegashira #8; 6–9 | West Maegashira #10; 9–6 | West Maegashira #4; 9–6 | West Sekiwake #1; 5–10 |
| 1984 | West Maegashira #3; 4–11 | East Maegashira #11; 9–6 | East Maegashira #4; 6–9 | West Maegashira #8; 6–9 | West Maegashira #12; 13–2; TF | West Komusubi #1; 6–9 |
| 1985 | East Maegashira #1; 5–10 ★ | East Maegashira #6; 8–7 | West Maegashira #2; 3–12 | East Maegashira #12; 8–7 | West Maegashira #8; 7–8 | East Maegashira #11; 8–7 |
| 1986 | West Maegashira #5; 5–10 | West Maegashira #10; 8–7 | East Maegashira #6; 6–9 | West Maegashira #9; 8–7 | West Maegashira #2; 5–10 | West Maegashira #6; 6–9 |
| 1987 | West Maegashira #11; 9–6 | East Maegashira #5; 6–9 | East Maegashira #9; 8–7 | West Maegashira #2; 5–10 | West Maegashira #6; 6–9 | East Maegashira #10; 8–7 |
| 1988 | West Maegashira #3; 4–11 | West Maegashira #8; 6–9 | West Maegashira #12; 5–10 | East Jūryō #3; 10–5–PP; Champion | West Maegashira #10; 8–7 | West Maegashira #7; 8–7 |
| 1989 | West Maegashira #2; 1–11–3 | West Maegashira #11; 8–7 | East Maegashira #6; 4–11 | East Maegashira #13; 6–5–4 | East Jūryō #2; 7–8 | West Jūryō #3; 10–5 |
| 1990 | East Maegashira #12; 8–7 | West Maegashira #9; 6–9 | East Maegashira #12; 9–6 | East Maegashira #6; 5–10 | West Maegashira #12; 5–10 | East Jūryō #2; 8–7 |
| 1991 | East Maegashira #14; 5–10 | West Jūryō #3; 5–10 | East Jūryō #9; Retired; 0–6 | x | x | x |
Record given as wins–losses–absences Top division champion Top division runner-up Retired Lower divisions Non-participation Sanshō key: F=Fighting spirit; O=Outstanding performance; T=Technique Also shown: ★=Kinboshi; P=Playoff(s); Divisions: Makuuchi — Jūryō — Makushita — Sandanme — Jonidan — Jonokuchi Makuuchi ranks: Yokozuna — Ōzeki — Sekiwake — Komusubi — Maegashira

== See also ==
- Glossary of sumo terms
- List of sumo elders
- List of sumo tournament top division champions
- List of sumo tournament second division champions
- List of past sumo wrestlers
- List of sekiwake
