= Tosanoumi Toshio =

Japanese sumo wrestler (born 1972)

土佐ノ海 敏生 Tosanoumi Toshio
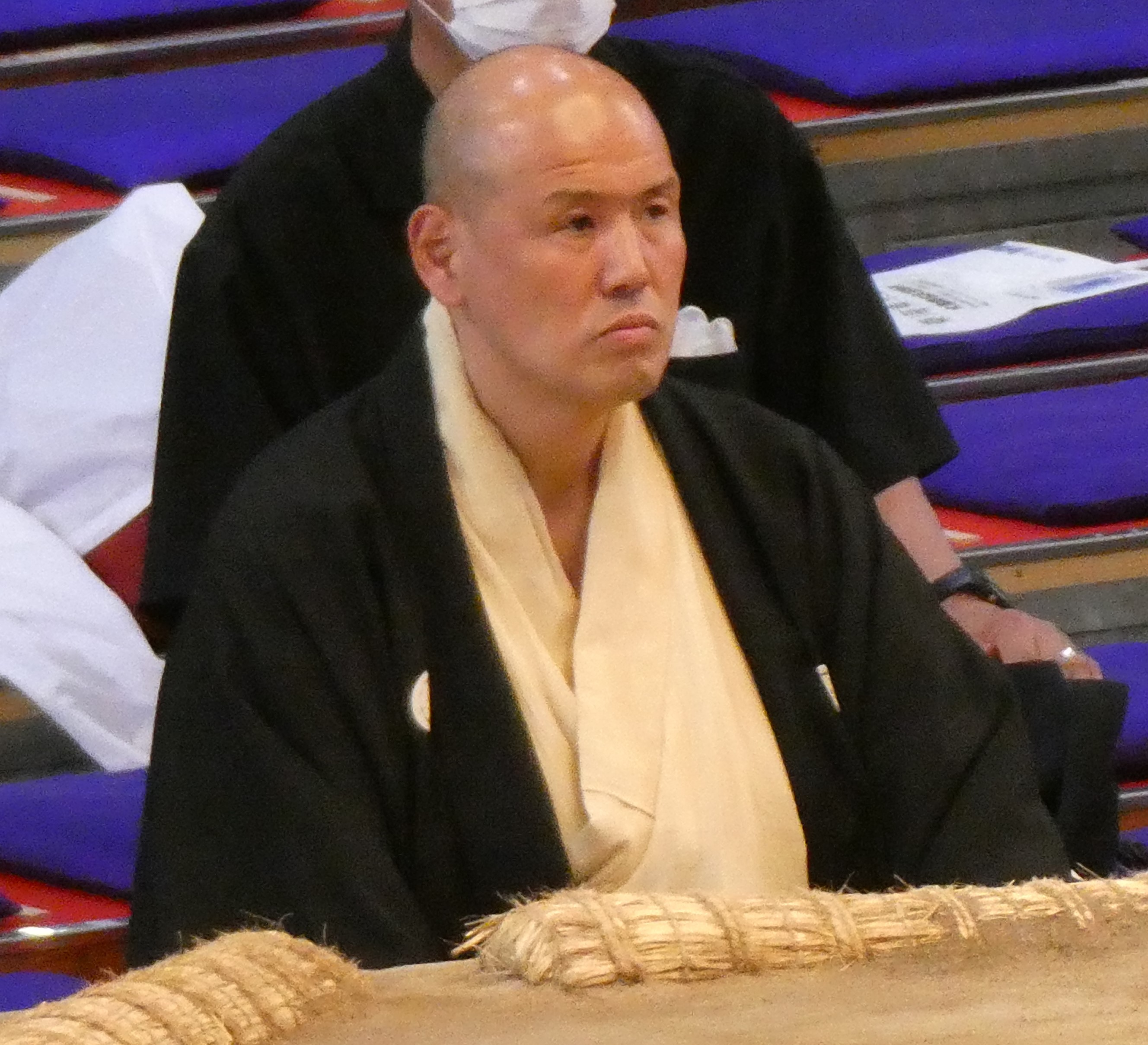

Personal information
- Born: Toshio Yamamoto; February 16, 1972 (age 54) Kōchi, Japan
- Height: 1.86 m (6 ft 1 in)
- Weight: 160 kg (353 lb; 25 st 3 lb)

Sport
- Sport: Sumo
- University team: Doshisha University
- Retired: January, 2011
- Heya: Isenoumi
- Record: 732–735–16
- Debut: March 1994
- Highest rank: Sekiwake (May 1997)
- Elder name: Tatekawa
- Championships: 2 (Jūryō); 1 (Makushita)
- Special Prizes: Outstanding Performance (7); Fighting Spirit (5); Technique (1)
- Gold Stars: 11; Takanohana II (4); Akebono (3); Wakanohana III (3); Musashimaru
- Updated on August 2012

Tosanoumi Toshio (born February 16, 1972, as Toshio Yamamoto in Aki City, Kōchi Prefecture, Japan), is a former sumo wrestler. He first reached the top division of professional sumo in 1995, winning 13 special prizes and earning 11 kinboshi or gold stars for defeating yokozuna over his long career. The highest rank he reached was sekiwake. He retired in 2010 to become a coach at his stable, Isenoumi stable under the name of Tatekawa.

== Career ==
After success in amateur sumo competitions while at Doshisha University, where he was a two-time winner of the All Western Japan Sumo Championships in 1992 and 1993, Yamamoto was recruited by former sekiwake Fujinokawa and joined Isenoumi stable. He was given the shikona of Tosanoumi, meaning "sea of Tosa", from his native Kōchi Prefecture. Because of his amateur achievements he had makushita tsukedashi status and entered professional sumo in the third, makushita division in March 1994. He entered jūryō four tournaments later. Another four tournaments later he was promoted to the highest, makuuchi division. Because he had won the yūshō or tournament championship with a 14–1 record from the rank of jūryō 1, he entered at maegashira 7, the second highest top division debut rank after Daiju in 1970. For his first makuuchi bouts he was drawn against some tough opponents; first ōzeki Wakanohana, followed by yokozuna Takanohana the second day. He lost both bouts, and would finish the tournament 7–8.

Recovering from this, his first ever make-koshi, Tosanoumi continued to rise through the ranks, reaching komusubi in January 1996 and sekiwake in May 1997. His best result in a tournament came in November 1998, when he finished as runner-up to Kotonishiki with 12 wins. Although he never rose higher than sekiwake, he held the rank for seven tournaments in total, the last being in May 2005. He was also ranked at komusubi on thirteen occasions, for a total of twenty tournaments in the san'yaku ranks. He remained in makuuchi continuously from July 1995 until January 2006, when a 5–10 result at maegashira 14 resulted in demotion to jūryō. He reappeared in makuuchi just two tournaments later in May 2006, but remained at the bottom of the division. He fell to jūryō on three further occasions, in May 2007, March 2008 and September 2008, but each time made an immediate return to the top division.

Tosanoumi won a total of thirteen prizes (equal to the seventh highest ever) and eleven gold stars (the fourth highest ever) in his long makuuchi career. He defeated two yokozuna in the same tournament on four separate occasions. He earned four gold stars from Takanohana, and three each from Wakanohana and Akebono. He is one of only three wrestlers to win kinboshi in four consecutive tournaments, which he achieved from November 1998 to May 1999. His last gold star came in 2003 when he beat Musashimaru, in what was the latter's last bout before retirement. In July 2007 he recorded his 600th career win, which came by default when his opponent withdrew. Tosanoumi is tenth on the all-time list of most top division appearances with 1183, and he had 80 tournaments ranked in the top division.

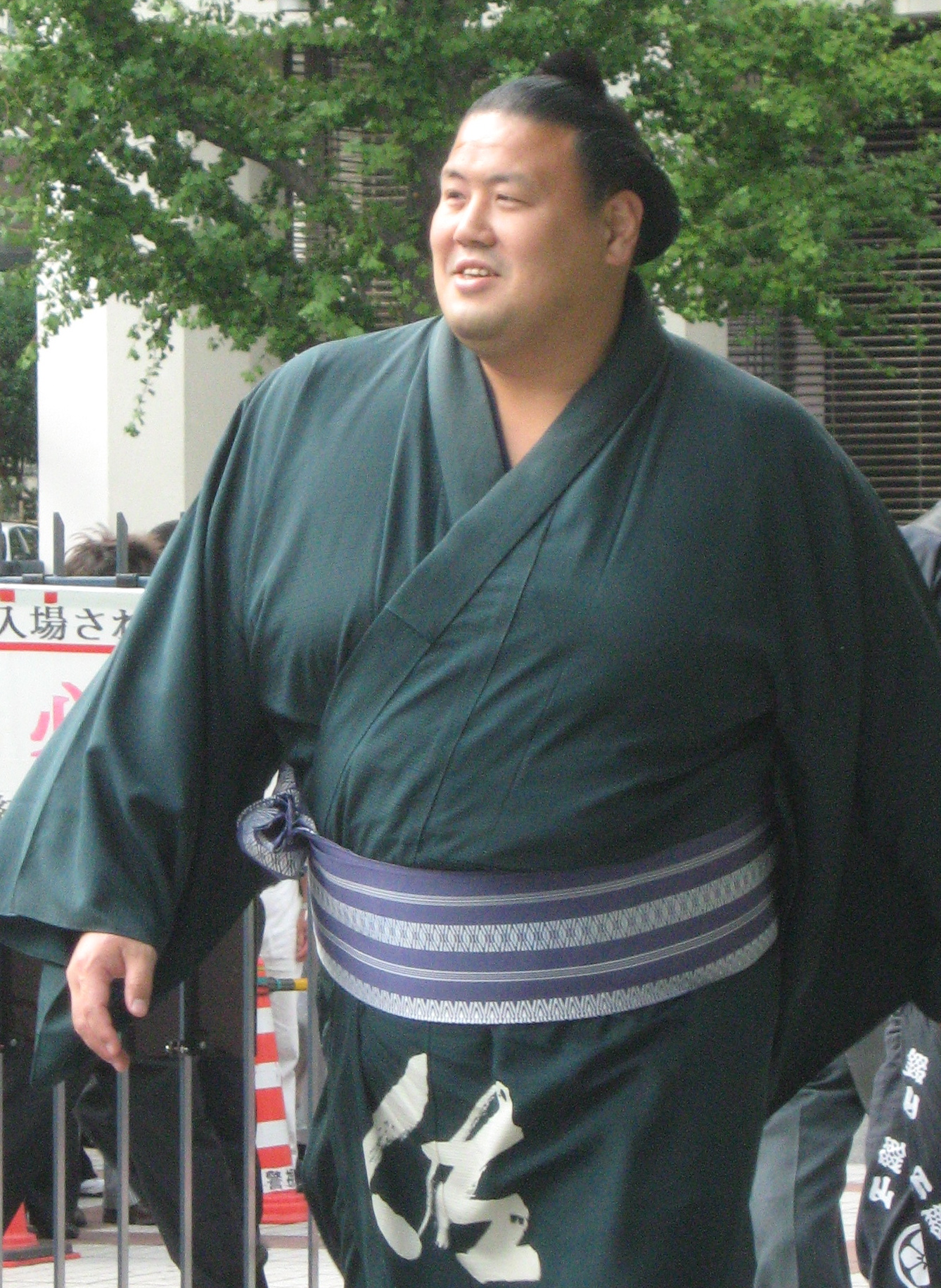
Tosanoumi in September 2008

He became the oldest active sekitori after the March 2009 tournament following the retirement of Ōtsukasa. However, he was unable to maintain his makuuchi position, dropping to jūryō 6 after winning only four matches at Maegashira 15. An 8–7 record in May was not enough to return him to the top division this time. He could manage only a 5–10 score in July, his first ever jūryō make-koshi. He recorded his 700th career win in the January 2010 tournament, the first makushita tsukedashi entrant to achieve this feat.

Following the large number of demotions to the jūryō division in September 2010 after six wrestlers were suspended from competition he made a surprise return to the top division, becoming at 38 years and six months the oldest man ever to do so (this record has since been broken by Aminishiki). He was however out of his depth and scored only 2–13, resulting in demotion straight back to jūryō.

== Retirement from sumo ==
In November 2010 Tosanoumi could score only 4–11 at jūryō 8, which would have resulted in demotion to the makushita division. This broke a run of 97 consecutive tournaments at a sekitori rank. Instead Tosanoumi chose to retire, announcing his decision on December 15 shortly before the release of the new rankings. He has stayed in sumo as a coach at Isenoumi stable under the toshiyori name Tatekawa, and his danpatsu-shiki or official retirement ceremony took place at the Ryōgoku Kokugikan on May 28, 2011.

== Fighting style ==
Tosanoumi's fighting style was solidly oshi-sumo, using pushing and thrusting techniques as opposed to yotsu-sumo or grappling techniques. He has attributed his relative lack of injuries during his career in part to this preference. Over 30 percent of his wins in sumo were oshi-dashi, a simple push out.

== Family ==
Tosanoumi announced in September 2008 that he would be getting married. The wedding reception and ceremony were held in January 2009.

== Career record ==
Tosanoumi Toshio
Year	January Hatsu basho, Tokyo	March Haru basho, Osaka	May Natsu basho, Tokyo	July Nagoya basho, Nagoya	September Aki basho, Tokyo	November Kyūshū basho, Fukuoka
1994	x	Makushita tsukedashi #60; 5–2	East Makushita #38; 7–0; Champion	East Makushita #4; 5–2	West Makushita #1; 5–2	East Jūryō #13; 11–4–P; Champion
1995	East Jūryō #6; 11–4–P	East Jūryō #2; 8–7	East Jūryō #1; 14–1; Champion	West Maegashira #7; 7–8	East Maegashira #8; 11–4; F	West Maegashira #1; 9–6; OT★★
1996	East Komusubi #1; 8–7	East Komusubi #1; 6–9	West Maegashira #1; 5–10	East Maegashira #5; 6–9	West Maegashira #6; 8–7	West Maegashira #1; 8–7; O
1997	East Maegashira #1; 9–6; O★★	East Komusubi #1; 8–7	West Sekiwake #1; 10–5; F	East Sekiwake #1; 8–7	East Sekiwake #1; 5–10	West Maegashira #1; 7–8
1998	East Maegashira #3; 5–10	East Maegashira #6; 10–5; F	West Maegashira #2; 4–11	East Maegashira #7; 7–7–1	East Maegashira #9; Sat out due to injury 0–0–15	East Maegashira #9; 12–3; F★
1999	West Maegashira #1; 7–8 ★	East Maegashira #2; 8–7 ★★	East Maegashira #1; 8–7; O★★	East Komusubi #1; 11–4; F	West Sekiwake #1; 7–8	West Komusubi #2; 10–5; O
2000	East Komusubi #1; 8–7	East Komusubi #1; 8–7	East Komusubi #1; 9–6	East Komusubi #1; 7–8	East Maegashira #1; 5–10	East Maegashira #4; 7–8
2001	East Maegashira #2; 5–10	West Maegashira #6; 6–9	West Maegashira #8; 9–6	East Maegashira #2; 8–7	East Maegashira #1; 7–8	East Maegashira #4; 7–8
2002	East Maegashira #7; 9–6	West Maegashira #1; 7–8	West Maegashira #2; 8–7	West Komusubi #1; 10–5; O	West Sekiwake #1; 6–9	West Maegashira #1; 8–7
2003	East Maegashira #1; 8–7	West Komusubi #1; 8–7	East Komusubi #1; 4–11	East Maegashira #5; 10–5	West Komusubi #1; 7–8	West Maegashira #2; 10–5; O★
2004	East Sekiwake #1; 4–11	West Maegashira #4; 5–10	West Maegashira #9; 7–8	East Maegashira #11; 11–4	West Maegashira #4; 7–8	East Maegashira #6; 9–6
2005	West Maegashira #2; 7–8	East Maegashira #3; 10–5	West Sekiwake #1; 4–11	East Maegashira #4; 5–10	East Maegashira #8; 6–9	East Maegashira #11; 5–10
2006	East Maegashira #14; 5–10	West Jūryō #1; 9–6	West Maegashira #12; 8–7	West Maegashira #9; 6–9	West Maegashira #12; 7–8	West Maegashira #12; 5–10
2007	East Maegashira #16; 8–7	West Maegashira #14; 6–9	West Jūryō #1; 8–7	West Maegashira #13; 8–7	West Maegashira #8; 6–9	East Maegashira #11; 7–8
2008	West Maegashira #12; 5–10	East Jūryō #1; 10–5	East Maegashira #12; 6–9	East Maegashira #14; 5–10	East Jūryō #2; 8–7	East Maegashira #16; 9–6
2009	East Maegashira #9; 5–10	East Maegashira #15; 4–11	West Jūryō #6; 8–7	West Jūryō #2; 5–10	East Jūryō #9; 7–8	East Jūryō #11; 9–6
2010	East Jūryō #5; 8–7	West Jūryō #3; 6–9	West Jūryō #6; 7–8	West Jūryō #7; 8–7	West Maegashira #16; 2–13	East Jūryō #8; 4–11
2011	East Makushita #1; Retired –	x	x	x	x	x
Record given as wins–losses–absences Top division champion Top division runner-up Retired Lower divisions Non-participation Sanshō key: F=Fighting spirit; O=Outstanding performance; T=Technique Also shown: ★=Kinboshi; P=Playoff(s); Divisions: Makuuchi — Jūryō — Makushita — Sandanme — Jonidan — Jonokuchi Makuuchi ranks: Yokozuna — Ōzeki — Sekiwake — Komusubi — Maegashira

== See also ==
- Glossary of sumo terms
- List of sumo record holders
- List of sumo tournament top division runners-up
- List of sumo tournament second division champions
- List of past sumo wrestlers
- List of sumo elders
- List of sekiwake
