= Kashiwado Tsuyoshi =

Japanese sumo wrestler

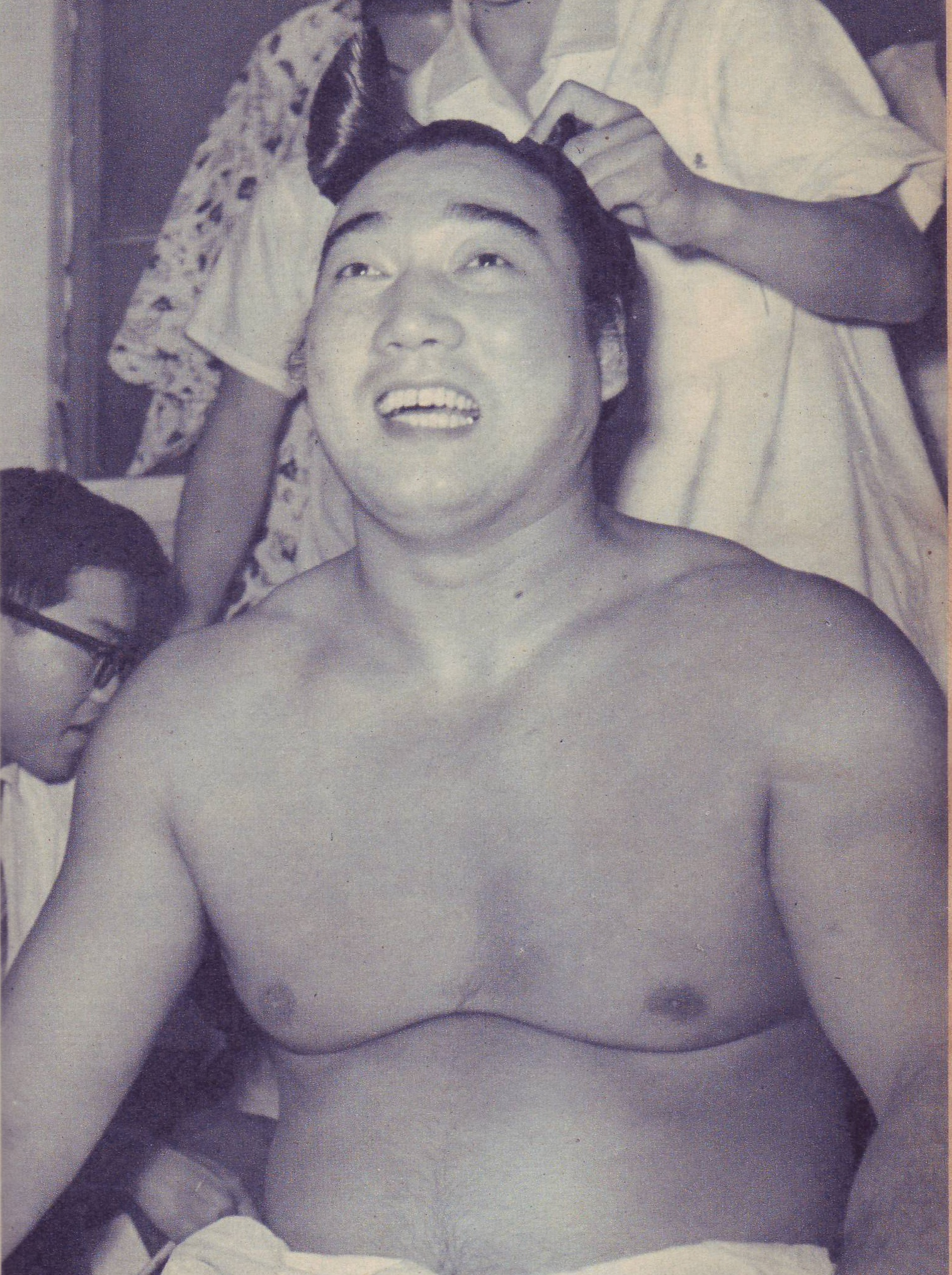
- Kashiwado, 1961

Personal information
- Native name: 柏戸 剛
- Born: Tsuyoshi Togashi; November 29, 1938 Yamagata Prefecture, Japan
- Died: December 8, 1996 (aged 58)
- Height: 1.88 m (6 ft 2 in)
- Weight: 139 kg (306 lb)

Sport
- Sport: Sumo
- Retired: July, 1969
- Heya: Isenoumi
- Record: 715-295-140
- Debut: September, 1954
- Highest rank: Yokozuna (September, 1961)
- Elder name: Kagamiyama
- Championships: 5 (Makuuchi); 1 (Jūryō); 1 (Makushita)
- Special Prizes: Fighting Spirit (2); Technique (4); Outstanding Performance (2)
- Updated on June 2020

Kashiwado Tsuyoshi (Japanese: 柏戸 剛; November 29, 1938 – December 8, 1996) was a Japanese professional sumo wrestler from Yamagata Prefecture. He was the sport's 47th yokozuna, fighting at the sport's highest rank from 1961 to 1969. After his retirement he became an elder of the Japan Sumo Association and ran his own training stable from 1970 until his death.

== Career ==
Born Tsuyoshi Togashi (富樫 剛) in what is now part of the city of Tsuruoka in the northern prefecture of Yamagata, he made his professional debut in September 1954, joining Isenoumi stable. He initially fought under his real name and rose rapidly up the rankings, winning the second division championship in March 1958 and almost again in May, losing the final bout in a seven-way playoff. After one more tournament he had reached the top makuuchi division in September 1958. In only his fourth top division tournament, coinciding with his adoption of the shikona surname Kashiwado, he was runner-up to yokozuna Tochinishiki with a 13–2 record and earned special prizes for Fighting Spirit and Technique. He made the sanyaku ranks in November 1959, earning promotion to ōzeki in September 1960 and becoming the first wrestler from his home prefecture to achieve this rank in 72 years, since Ōdate's promotion in 1888. Kashiwado took his first top division yūshō or championship in January 1961. After taking part in a three way playoff for the championship in September of that year that a ultimately lost, he was promoted to yokozuna nevertheless, joining the aging pair of Asashio III and Wakanohana who were soon to retire.

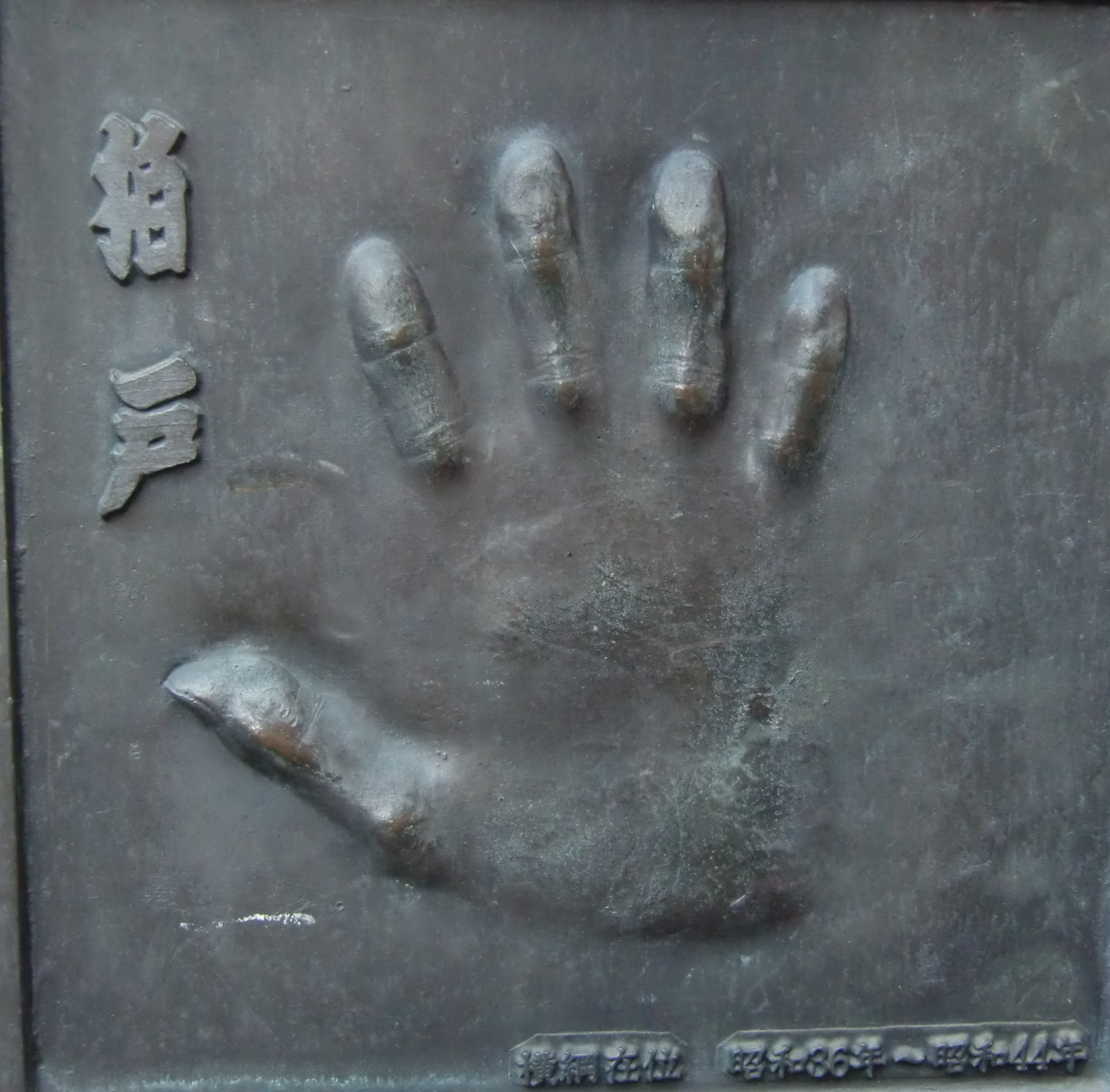
Kashiwado's handprint displayed on a monument in Ryōgoku, Tokyo

Kashiwado changed the spelling of his ring name to 柏戸 健志 in May 1962, but changed it back in November 1964. He went on to win five top division championships in total, a long way behind the thirty-two captured by his rival Taihō, who was promoted to yokozuna simultaneously with him. He was however a tournament runner-up on no fewer than fifteen occasions. Kashiwado suffered from many injury problems during his career, which led to him being dubbed the "glass yokozuna". He failed to complete four tournaments in a row from January to July 1963. However he made a spectacular comeback in September 1963, winning his first championship as a yokozuna with a perfect 15–0 record. He was listed as a yokozuna on the banzuke for 47 tournaments, which puts him in equal seventh place on the all-time list. He was popular among sumo crowds, appealing to those who found Taihō too dominant. The eight years in which the two shared the yokozuna rank was known as the Hakuhō era, a combination of their names (Haku is another reading of Kashi) as well as a pun on the late 7th century period known as the Hakuhō period. Their head-to-head record was fairly even, standing at 18–16 in Taihō's favour by May 1967, before Taihō won their last five matches in a row as Kashiwado began to fade.

== Fighting style ==
Kashiwado's favoured kimarite or techniques were migi-yotsu (a left hand outside, right hand inside grip on the opponents mawashi), yorikiri (force out) and tsukidashi (thrust out). In all, about sixty percent of his wins were by either force out or force out and down (yoritaoshi).

== Retirement from sumo ==
After retiring from active competition in July 1969 Kashiwado remained in the sumo world as an elder, and he opened up his own stable, Kagamiyama, in November 1970. In July 1975 he oversaw the simultaneous promotion of Zaonishiki and Konuma to jūryō. He coached Tagaryū to the sekiwake rank, and a top division championship in September 1984. He also served as a director of the Sumo Association and was head of the judges committee until 1994. He died of liver failure in 1996, at the age of 58. Taihō was at Kashiwado's bedside and was distraught over his death. The former Tagaryū took over the running of Kagamiyama stable, which still exists as of 2020, but with only two wrestlers.

== Career record ==
- The Kyushu tournament was first held in 1957, and the Nagoya tournament in 1958.

Kashiwado Tsuyoshi
Year	January Hatsu basho, Tokyo	March Haru basho, Osaka	May Natsu basho, Tokyo	July Nagoya basho, Nagoya	September Aki basho, Tokyo	November Kyūshū basho, Fukuoka
1954	x	x	x	Not held	3–3; Maezumo	Not held
1955	East Jonokuchi #12; 6–2	East Jonidan #37; 6–2	West Sandanme #84; 5–3	Not held	East Sandanme #62; 2–5	Not held
1956	East Sandanme #66; 7–1	West Sandanme #20; 6–2	West Makushita #69; 8–0–P; Champion	Not held	West Makushita #17; 4–4	Not held
1957	West Makushita #16; 5–3	West Makushita #8; 4–4	East Makushita #8; 7–1	Not held	West Makushita #1; 5–3	West Jūryō #22; 8–7
1958	East Jūryō #21; 7–8	West Jūryō #22; 12–3; Champion	West Jūryō #10; 11–4–PPP	East Jūryō #4; 12–3	East Maegashira #20; 9–6	West Maegashira #17; 8–7
1959	East Maegashira #16; 8–7	West Maegashira #13; 13–2; FT	East Maegashira #4; 5–10	East Maegashira #8; 9–6	East Maegashira #3; 12–3; F	East Komusubi #1; 8–7
1960	East Komusubi #1; 9–6; T	West Sekiwake #2; 9–6; O	West Sekiwake #1; 10–5; T	East Sekiwake #1; 11–4; TO	West Ōzeki #1; 12–3	East Ōzeki #1; 11–4
1961	West Ōzeki #1; 13–2	East Ōzeki #1; 12–3	East Ōzeki #1; 10–5	West Ōzeki #1; 11–4	West Ōzeki #1; 12–3–PP	East Yokozuna #2; 12–3
1962	West Yokozuna #1; 10–5	East Yokozuna #2; 11–4	West Yokozuna #1; 11–4	West Yokozuna #1; 11–4	West Yokozuna #1; 11–4	West Yokozuna #1; 12–3
1963	West Yokozuna #1; Sat out due to injury 0–0–15	West Yokozuna #1; 5–1–9	West Yokozuna #1; Sat out due to injury 0–0–15	West Yokozuna #1; Sat out due to injury 0–0–15	West Yokozuna #1; 15–0	East Yokozuna #1; 10–5
1964	West Yokozuna #1; 12–3	West Yokozuna #1; 14–1	West Yokozuna #1; 11–1–3	West Yokozuna #1; Sat out due to injury 0–0–15	East Yokozuna #2; 4–2–9	East Yokozuna #2; 2–4–9
1965	West Yokozuna #1; Sat out due to injury 0–0–15	West Yokozuna #2; Sat out due to injury 0–0–15	West Yokozuna #2; 9–6	East Yokozuna #2; 12–3	East Yokozuna #2; 12–3–PP	West Yokozuna #1; 1–1–13
1966	West Yokozuna #2; 14–1	East Yokozuna #1; 10–5	West Yokozuna #1; 12–3	West Yokozuna-Ōzeki #1; 12–3	West Yokozuna #1; 13–2–P	West Yokozuna #1; 10–5
1967	West Yokozuna #1; 12–3	East Yokozuna #2; 11–4	West Yokozuna #1; 13–2	West Yokozuna #1; 14–1	East Yokozuna #1; 9–6	East Yokozuna #2; 11–4
1968	East Yokozuna #2; 9–6	West Yokozuna #1; 9–6	East Yokozuna #1; 4–4–7	East Yokozuna #1; 10–5	East Yokozuna #1; 9–6	West Yokozuna #1; 11–4
1969	West Yokozuna #1; 10–5	West Yokozuna #1; 9–6	East Yokozuna #1; 9–6	West Yokozuna #1; Retired; 1–3		
Record given as wins–losses–absences Top division champion Top division runner-up Retired Lower divisions Non-participation Sanshō key: F=Fighting spirit; O=Outstanding performance; T=Technique Also shown: ★=Kinboshi; P=Playoff(s); Divisions: Makuuchi — Jūryō — Makushita — Sandanme — Jonidan — Jonokuchi Makuuchi ranks: Yokozuna — Ōzeki — Sekiwake — Komusubi — Maegashira

== See also ==
- Glossary of sumo terms
- List of past sumo wrestlers
- List of sumo tournament top division champions
- List of sumo tournament top division runners-up
- List of sumo tournament second division champions
- List of yokozuna

Preceded by Asashio Tarō III	47th Yokozuna; 1961–1969	Succeeded by Taihō Kōki
Yokozuna is not a successive rank, and more than one wrestler can hold the title at once
