= List of sumo trophies =

List of trophies awarded in professional sumo

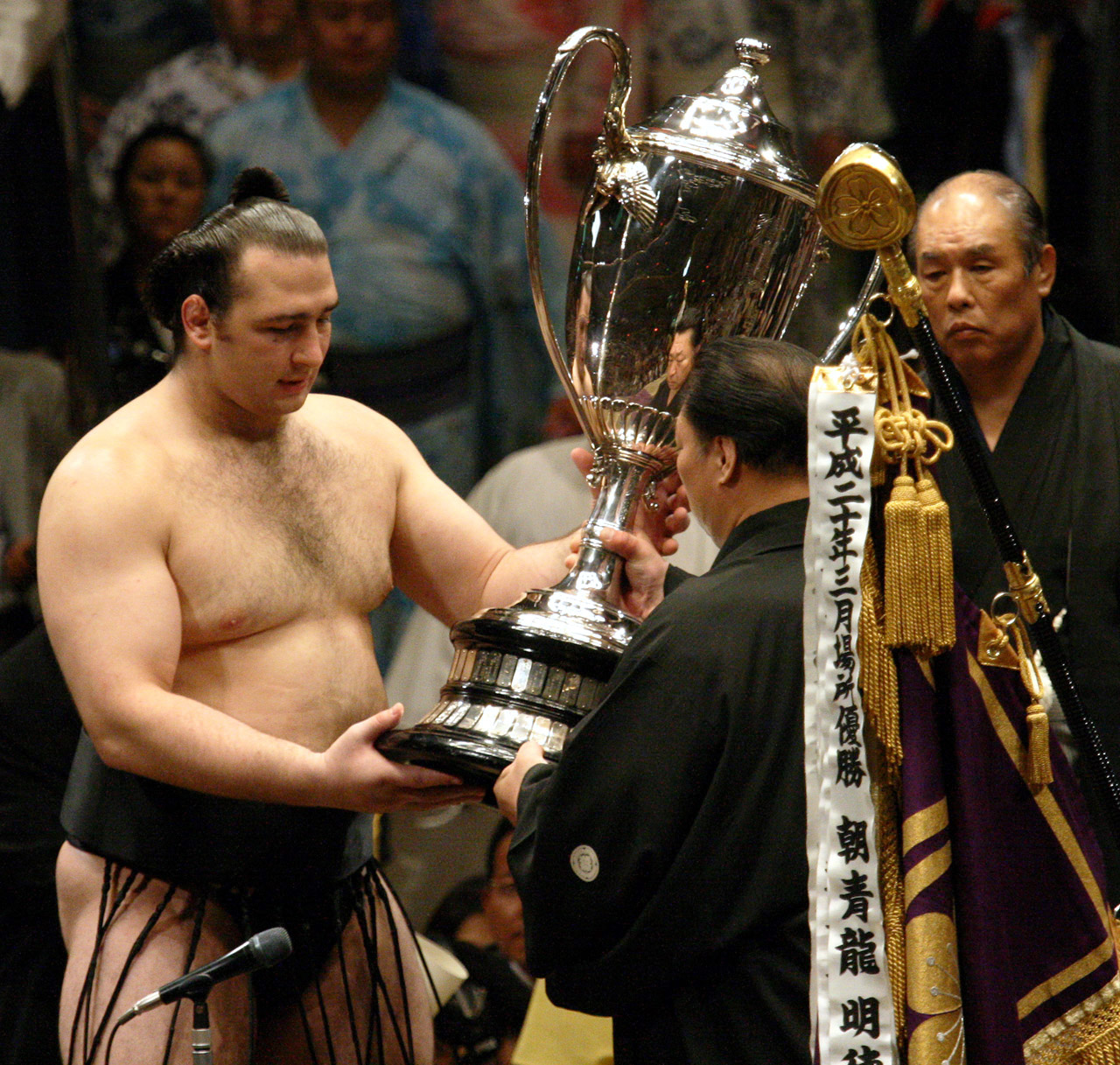
Ōzeki Kotoōshū wins the May 2008 tournament and is presented the Emperor's Cup by Kitanoumi, the chairman of the Japan Sumo Association.

Grand Sumo (Ōzumō) is considered the national sport of Japan. Therefore, the winner of the top division championship receives a lot of trophies as tokens of recognition from the highest public figures of Japan but also from foreign States as diplomatic gifts. Companies also offer trophies as a show of goodwill in support of the national sport and as part of partnerships. The reward ceremony is however on the decline. In recent years, several controversies have led some companies to withdraw their support by withdrawing a trophy that had previously been awarded. Notably, the 2010 baseball betting scandal brought an end to the collaboration of a number of companies. However, the recent scandals are not entirely responsible for the decline of the award ceremony. The ceremony itself is held after NHK's live broadcast of sumo matches and therefore does not attract much attention. Even though prefectural governors and chairpersons of organisations appear, only about 30% of the audience remains for the awards ceremony. The arena is often deserted and applause are sparse.

However, the awards ceremony retains a strong symbolic value. In sumo, a promising wrestler who is the center of the stable is called a yome-bitsu (米びつ), meaning "breadwinner", because if he wins one of the tournaments, he receives enough extra prizes to keep the stable fed for a year or more.

Trophies are usually exhibited in the entrance hall of the tournament venues.

== Sumo award ceremony ==
Makuuchi's prizes are presented to the wrestler who achieved a championship win on the last day of one of the six main tournaments. Trophies are presented with handwritten victory certificates and supplementary cash prizes. With the increased number of prizes, the reward ceremony takes around 40 minutes to complete. Trophies may vary slightly by location, such as from the host municipality. In addition, since women are not allowed on the dohyō, only men can give the rewards.
The Emperor's Cup and the Japan Sumo Association championship flag are returned by the winning wrestler himself at the return ceremony held after the ring-entering ceremonies on the first day of the next tournament. In addition, as a general rule, the master of the stable in which the winning wrestler belongs will act on his behalf if the wrestler cannot return it due to being kyūjō or retiring before the next tournament is held.
If a wrestler is injured during the tournament but still manages to win, there is an example in which an oyakata or wakaimonogashira accompanies the winner because there are worries whether the wrestler can receive the trophy alone. This was the case for Chiyonofuji in the March 1989 tournament.
In July 2010, following the baseball gambling scandal, the Sumo Association refused to award any prizes with the exception of the winner's flag and special prizes, in the form of taking responsibility for the turmoil and in 2011, the March tournament was cancelled and reclassified as a "Technical Examination Tournament", and no awards ceremony was organized.

=== Order of the reward ceremony ===
The presentation of the Grand Sumo trophies follows a meticulous protocol. After the last match on the last day of a tournament (senshūraku), the winning wrestler returns from the shitaku-beya in mawashi, a commentator then announced to the audience that the awards ceremony would begin with the Japanese national anthem. The national anthem is often played by military bands (Ground Self-Defense Force, Maritime Self-Defense Force, Air Self-Defense Force) or by the municipalities hosting the tournament (Tokyo Band, Osaka Shion Wind Orchestra).
At the end of the anthem, the commentator finally announces the wrestler's full shikona name and proclaims him the winner of the tournament. As a first step, three prizes are then awarded to the winner. The first trophy awarded is the Emperor's Cup by the JSA chairman. This particular trophy is presented on the theme of Act 3 of George Frideric Handel's Judas Maccabaeus ('See the Conquering Hero Comes!'). Then, the JSA championship flag is awarded by the chairman of the JSA judging department and the Prime Minister's Cup is also awarded. The champion is then interviewed at ringside by an NHK commentator. After the interview, the main part of the awards ceremony takes place in the following order: diplomatic, municipal and corporate trophies and, for special tournaments such as the first or last of the year, special trophies such as the trophy rewarding the wrestler with the most wins in the year or the best makuuchi newcomer.
After the main trophies have been awarded, the chairman of the JSA judging department awards the sanshō prizes to the wrestlers who stood out during the tournament that has just ended.

After the awards ceremony is over, it is customary for the tournament to end definitively with a god-sending ceremony (Kami okuri no gi, 神送りの儀). In this brief Shinto ceremony, a sanbon jime is performed to announce the tournament definitively closes. A low-ranking gyōji holding a gohei is then thrown into the air by low-ranking and maezumō wrestlers.

== Main prizes ==
Photo	Name	Description	Awarded by	Awarded since	Note	Status
	The Emperor's Cup; Tennō shihai (天皇賜杯)	A silver trophy of 1.08 m (3 ft 6 1/2 in) tall and weighing 29 kg (64 lb). The chrysanthemum symbol of the Imperial family is carved on the trophy. The kanji for shihai (賜盃), meaning "gifted trophy", a traditional phrasing for a trophy bestowed by the emperor, are carved in the trophy. Its handles are phoenixes and the base of the trophy is filled with engraved plates with the name of the winning wrestlers of the past tournaments. 78 wrestlers can complete one round, once a round is filled the plates are removed and added to boards exhibited near the trophy in the Kokugikan.	Japan Sumo Association chairman (rijichō) in the name of the Emperor of Japan	1926	Emperor's cups are trophies bestowed by the Imperial Household Agency to organizations that manage competitions, and serve as proof of imperial recognition, giving authority to the competition. First awarded to Yokozuna Tsunenohana in January 1926, because of the merging of all the independent sumo associations into one entity. First known as "Prince Regent Cup" as Emperor Shōwa granted the trophy during his regency.	Active
	The championship flag Yūshōki (優勝旗)	The flag is purple, because the colour symbolises strength, and is embroidered and fringed in gold. It bears the cherry blossom mon of the Japan Sumo Association in its middle and features the kanji for yūshō (優勝, 'victory').	Japan Sumo Association's Judging department chairman	1909	Introduced with the 1909's tournament reform creating the yūshōkishu system. Highest trophy awarded to wrestlers before the introduction of the Emperor's Cup. Held by a flag bearer (usually a high-ranking makuuchi wrestler from the same stable or the same ichimon) during the winner's parade after the tournament. The championship flag is the only trophy awarded in the name of the Association, along the sanshō prizes.	Active
	Prime Minister's Cup; Naikaku sōri daijin-hai (内閣総理大臣杯)	A wide silver trophy weighting 40 kg (88 lb).	Cabinet of the Government of Japan; Chief Cabinet Secretary or Deputy Chief Cabinet Secretary (usually); Japanese Prime Minister (sometimes)	1968	Prime Minister's cups are trophies awarded by the Prime Minister's cabinet to organizations involved in sports competitions.	Active

== Diplomatic trophies ==
Some states directly sponsors trophies in professional sumo. Usually those trophies serves to mark a diplomatic anniversary and are awarded once or a few time before disappearing. However some states have a long tradition to award trophies.

Photo	Name	Description	Awarded by	Awarded since	Note	Status
	French–Japanese Friendship Cup (and giant macaron)	A cup with two phoenixes serving as handles. The trophy is also accompanied by an emblematic inedible macaron coming in three colours: green, pink and gold. The macaron is measuring 41 cm (1 ft 4 in) in diameter and 23 cm (9 in) in height and is designed by French pastry chef-chocolatier Pierre Hermé.	French Republic	2008 (2011 with the macaron)	Comes with a luxurious box of 22 real macarons, wrapped in gold paper.	Active
	President of the French Republic Cup	Striated porcelain vase, measuring 34 cm (1 ft 1 1/2 in) in diameter and 66 cm (2 ft 2 in) in height. The vase is gilded with fine gold, with a 24 carat pure gold circle chamfered on the upper part of the vase, symbolizing a rising Sun. Made by French painter Pierre Soulages and executed by the Manufacture nationale de Sèvres.	French Republic	2000	Known informally as the "Jacques Chirac cup" (japanised as "Shiraku cup"). Created after a French ambassador to Japan suggested to Jacques Chirac, a known sumo fan, to have a trophy made by Pierre Soulages. Awarded for the first time at the July 2000 tournament. Now exposed in the French embassy in Tokyo.	Inactive
	United Mexican Friendship Plaque	Represents an Aztec calendar.	United Mexican States	1981	Awarded since the visit of a Japan Sumo Association delegation of 110 people to Mexico in 1981. Comes with a year supply of Corona beer.	Active
	Cup of His Highness	A big dallah coffee pot.	United Arab Emirates	1979	Awarded by Sheikh Zayed bin Sultan Al Nahyan during an official visit in Japan in 1990. Comes with a year of gasoline.	Active
	Chiang Rai Elephant trophy	A Thai elephant statue made of fiberglass. Patterns on the statue are drawn by local artists in Chiang Rai, to reflect Thai and Japanese cultures. On one side of the statue Rama's monkeys are wrestling each other under a cassia tree, Thailand's national tree. On the other side of the elephant, two sumo wrestlers bout each other under a Japanese cherry blossom tree.	Kingdom of Thailand	2022	The design was chosen because of the Chiang Rai Elephant Foundation, a charity creating elephant statues and working on the preservation of elephants in Thailand. Awarded to celebrate the 135th anniversary of Thailand-Japan diplomatic relations. Comes with a supply of Chabaa Bangkok fruit juice or Singha beer.	Active
	Thai–Japanese friendship trophy		Kingdom of Thailand	2017	Created to commemorate the 130th anniversary of Thailand-Japan diplomatic relations.	Inactive
	Hungarian Friendship (tea) Cup	The tea cup measures about 45 cm (1 ft 5 1/2 in) high with a capacity of approximately 15 liters. The cup is made by the Hungary-based Herend Porcelain Manufactory.	Hungary	2019	Awarded to commemorate the 150th anniversary of the establishment of diplomatic relations between Japan and Hungary. Comes with a tea set made by the Herend Porcelain Manufactory.	Active
	Hungarian friendship cup	A 1.17 m (3 ft 10 in) high pot made by Herend Porcelain Manufactory.	Hungary	1986	First awarded during the 1986 January tournament by the Hungarian People's Republic. The trophy continued being awarded after the country was democratized in 1989.	Inactive
	Czech crystal cup	A Czech crystal hand-cut cup made by the Moser glass company. It weighs 15 kg (33 lb) and measures about 70 cm (2 ft 3 1/2 in).	Czech Republic	2004	The Czech Republic have awarded a sumo trophy since 1970. Comes with a year of Pilsner beer.	Active
	Czech crystal bowl	A Czech crystal hand-cut bowl weighting 14 kg (31 lb).	Czech Republic	1970	The bowl have been replaced by the current cup in 2004.	Inactive
	Mongolian Prime Minister's award	Three bökh wrestlers holds a 12 litres silver gilt cup. The original trophy was made with 12 kg (26 lb) of solid silver and 500 g of pure gold.	Mongolia	2003	Also known as "The wrestlers who fought for three hours" Cup (Гурван цагийг билэгдсэн бөхчүүд). In 2022, following the meeting between Mongolian-born yokozuna Hakuhō and Mongolian Prime Minister Luvsannamsrain Oyun-Erdene, it was announced the trophy would serve as a gift to Hakuhō who recently retired. Since March 2023, a new trophy has been awarded. It is however identical to the previous one (although silver) and has the same name.	Active
	Mongolian Prime Minister's award	A trophy resembling a column.	Mongolia	1998		Inactive
Only in Tokyo
	Chinese Embassy Award	Trophy made using colored enamels held in place within partitions formed by metal strips or wires, the process being repeated to fill in the gaps left by shrinkage during firing. This technique is emblematic of the Jingtai era, hence the nickname of the trophy "China-Japan Jingtai Blue Cup".	People's Republic of China	1980	Awarded in memory of the past links of sumo in China. Comes with a supply of Shaoxing wine.	Active
	United States President's Cup	A silver trophy of 1.37 meters tall and weighing 30 kg (66 lb). The trophy is topped by a bald eagle.	United States of America	2019	Only awarded in May. First awarded by president Donald Trump in 2019, hence its nickname of "Trump Cup".	Active
	Cup of the Bulgarian government	A silver trophy made by bulgarian artist Stavri Kalinov. The trophy height is about 75 cm (2 ft 5 1/2 in), decorated with roses, the national flower of Bulgaria, on hanging ribbons. It is also decorated with gold leaves.	Republic of Bulgaria	2012	Comes with a supply of Bulgarian wines.	Active
	Italia Hatsubasho Award	A glass plate made by Venini.	Italian Republic	2023		Active
	Japan–Italy 150th Anniversary of Diplomatic Relations Commemorative Award		Italian Republic	2016	Special prize offered in collaboration with the Parmigiano Reggiano and Parma Ham Consortia on the occasion of the 150th anniversary of diplomatic relations between Italy and Japan.	Inactive
	Japanese–Israel Friendship Trophy	A shofar horn. The trophy is supported by a pedestal made of Israeli olives and iron resembling a cherry tree.	State of Israel	2023	The trophy was created by Ohad Sheinwald, an Israeli artist living in Japan. Comes with a supply of Kfar Bin Nun wine and dates.	Active

== Governments trophies ==
Photo	Name	Description	Awarded by	Awarded since	Note	Status
	Miyazaki Governor's Award	A trophy in the shape of a cow dressed for a contest.	Miyazaki Prefecture	1986	The trophy is presented in cooperation with the Council for Better Miyazaki Beef Promotion. Comes with a Miyazaki beef carcass and a ton of seasonal fruits and vegetables.	Active
	Fukui Prefectural Prize	A trophy filled with red pickled plum.	Fukui Prefecture	1986	Comes with one year's worth of umeboshi as Fukui is the largest plum growing area of Japan.	Active
	Nara Prefectural Governor's Award	The trophy is a bronze statue of a sumo wrestler. It was created based on the mosaic wall painting of the former National Stadium of Nara-city. The pedestal is decorated with a Nara traditional lacquerware craft and with patterns inspired by the Shōsōin treasures. It is 84 cm (2 ft 9 in) high, 50 cm (1 ft 7 1/2 in) wide and weighs 15 kg (33 lb).	Nara Prefecture	2014	The wrestler on top of the trophy is Nomi no Sukune because Nara Prefecture is where Nomi no Sukune and Taima no Kehaya are said to have fought. Therefore, Nara Prefecture is said to be the birthplace of sumo. The trophy was originally intended to be awarded at every Tokyo tournament but was later awarded at other honbasho during the 2020s. Comes with a supply of vegetables for chankonabe.	Active
Only in Tokyo
	Tokyo Metropolitan Governor's Award	A lion statue on top of a wooden box. The statue is made of bronze and weighs around 25 kilograms.	Tokyo Metropolitan Government	1981	Nicknamed the "Lion Warrior Statue", the trophy was designed by Kitamura Seibo, an honorary citizen of Tokyo.	Active
	Fukushima Governor's Award (and 15 kg (33 lb) tawara straw bag of rice)	The trophy weighs about 15 kilograms, is about 60 cm (1 ft 11 1/2 in) high and 66 cm (2 ft 2 in) wide, including the zelkova base. An Akabeko carries a golden rice bag on its back. During the award speech, it is accompanied by a tawara bag of rice.	Fukushima Prefecture	2013	Also known as the "Akabeko Trophy", because of the red cow legend of the Enzō-ji temple of Yanaizu in the ninth century. The trophy became awarded as a communication plan to ensure the safety of Fukushima's products following the nuclear accident of 2011. Comes with 1 ton of local "Ten no Tsubu" rice.	Active
Only in Osaka
	Osaka Prefectural Governor's Award	Tall trophy topped with the symbol of the Osaka prefecture.	Osaka Prefecture	2019	Comes with an assortment of products sponsored by several local businesses (such as sake, miso, caramelized rice, pork buns, dashi, monaka bean paste sandwichs, soy sauce or brown sugar).	Active
	Osaka Governor's Award Plaque	Wooden plaque with a metal dohyō ring and roof on its center.	Osaka Prefecture	2011		Inactive
	Osaka Mayor's Award	A victory flag.	Osaka-city		A ton of Naniwa Ward traditional vegetables.	Inactive
	Osaka Mayor's Award	The trophy is a ranma carved wooden panel of Osaka Castle.	Osaka-city			Inactive
	Wakayama Prefectural Governor's Prize	A negoro-nuri lacquered large sake cup	Wakayama Prefecture	2008	Comes with a selection of fruits grown in the prefecture.	Active
	Yuasa Mayor's Award (and fermentation wooden barrel)	The trophy is a custom made glass mug with a soy sauce barrel design. It is accompanied by a wooden barrel in which soy sauce is traditionally matured.	Yuasa-city	2011	Comes with a year of soy sauce as Yuasa-city is the birth place of soy sauce in Japan.	Active
	Matsue Mayor's Award		Matsue-city		Comes with 1 ton of yamatoshijimi, a special product of Lake Shinji.	Inactive
Only in Nagoya
	Aichi Prefectural Governor's Award (and bouquet).	A tall trophy with a lacquered green cup.	Aichi Prefecture	1985	Comes with an assortment of products sponsored by several local businesses: 50,000 boiled quail eggs, 100 kg (220 lb) of Nagoya Cochin chicken meat, 1,000 Cochin chicken eggs, 500 kg (1,100 lb) of short-necked clams, eel.; The bouquet is awarded because Aichi Prefecture is also known as the "Kingdom of Flowers", being the leading flower producer in Japan since 1962.	Active
	Nagoya Mayor's Award (Makuuchi)	A silver cup supported by golden shachihoko shaped after the golden roof ornaments of Nagoya Castle.	Nagoya-city		Comes with a piece of so-shibori dyed fabric for yukata and heko obi from Arimatsu.	Active
	Nagoya Mayor's Award (Jūryō)	A greenstone trophy with four shachihoko back-to-back. It is a reference to the roof ornaments of Nagoya City Hall.	Nagoya-city		This particular trophy is not awarded to the top division champion, but to the jūryō division champion. Comes with a year of kishimen noodles.	Active
Only in Fukuoka
	Fukuoka Prefectural Governor's Prize		Fukuoka Prefecture		Comes with a year supply of agricultural products (strawberries, ariake seaweed, chicken and rice).	Active
	Fukuoka Mayor's Award	Small sumo wrestler with a keshō-mawashi on top of a wooden base. The trophy weighs 25 kg (55 lb).	Fukuoka-city		Trophy made to look like a Hakata doll. Comes with a year supply of mentaiko	Active
	Fukuoka Mayor's Award	Samurai equipped with a spear drinking with a sakazuki on top of a wooden base.	Fukuoka-city	1998	Only awarded in November 1998 and 2020. The trophy is based on the emblematic statue of Mori Yoshinobu near the Hakata Station. Mori Yoshinobu (nicknamed Mori Tahei) is a famed samurai retainer of Fukushima Masanori. He is known for his resistance to alcohol and for being the owner of the Nihon-gō spear, one of the Three Great Spears of Japan.	Inactive

== Press and businesses trophies ==
Photo	Name	Description	Awarded by	Awarded since	Note	Status
	Ōita's Shiitake Agricultural Cooperative Award	A transparent cylindrical trophy filled with shiitake mushrooms. It weighs 21 kg (46 lb).	Ōita Prefecture's Shiitake Agricultural Cooperative	1979	The mushrooms are arranged by hand to face flat-side outwards. After the awards ceremony, they are brought to the preparation room, removed from the trophy and packed in a plastic bag for transportation.	Active
	Japan Airlines Award		Japan Airlines			Inactive
	Pan American Airlines Award	A huge globe weighting 42 kg (93 lb) for a size of 1.30 m (4 ft 3 in).	Pan American World Airways	1961	Even after the company withdrew from the Far East route in 1985, the trophy continued to be awarded until the summer of 1991 when the company went bankrupt.	Inactive
	NHK Gold Cup		Nippon Hōsō Kyōkai	1955	A glittering gold cup that imitates the "Gold bronze eight-fold long cup", one of the treasures of the Shōsōin house. Created to commemorate the 30th anniversary of the start of broadcasting.	Active
	Championship portrait	A replica of a framed portrait of the winning wrestler. The official portrait is 3 m (9 ft 10 in) high, 2 m (6 ft 6 1/2 in) wide, and weighs about 80 kg (180 lb). The official portrait is then hang on top of the arena in the Ryōgoku Kokugikan.	Mainichi Shimbun	1909	The display of the championship portraits at the Kokugikan began in 1909 as a project of the Mainichi Shimbun. During the war, the project was suspended but resumed in 1951. Colour photographs were originally made by colouring photographs with oil paints until 2014, when colour photographs began to be used.	Active
	Ōzeki award	A large silver sakazuki.	Ōzeki Brewery	1958	It is customary for the winning wrestler to drink celebratory sake with this big sakazuki cup. Ōzeki sake began to present a supplementary prize to the winning wrestler at the Osaka tournament in 1900. Today's trophy is awarded since 1958. Comes with a supply of Ōzeki "ONE CUP" sake.	Active
	Coca-Cola Award	A silver cola bottle.	Coca-Cola Japan	1965		Inactive
	Baume et Mercier Award	A trophy with the picture of a watch. A phi letter (Φ) is on top of the trophy because it's the symbol of the Baume et Mercier company.	Baume et Mercier Japan			Inactive
	Hokuren Award	A bronze owl trophy.	Hokuren Federation of Agricultural Cooperatives		4-ton of different agricultural commodities (milk, cheese, potatoes, asparagus, etc...)	Inactive
	Taisei's Runner-up Award	A kabuto with a large crescent crest.	Taisei Corporation		Awarded as a second prize to the wrestler achieving a junyūshō.	Inactive
Only in Tokyo
	Tokyo Shimbun award	A wooden plaque with the kanji for victory (優勝) and two sumo wrestlers fighting.	Tokyo Shimbun Sports			Active
	ZEN-NOH Award	The trophy is a bronze statue 1.1 m (3 ft 7 1/2 in) high and weighing 25 kg (55 lb) representing a sumo wrestler carrying a bag of rice on his back.	National Federation of Agricultural Co-operative Associations	1978	Comes with 30 bales of rice, 1 ton of meat and fruit	Inactive
	TCCI Chairman's Prize	The trophy is a kumiko lamp, an upright rectangular wooden structure equipped with a lighting system.	Tokyo Chamber of Commerce and Industry	2012	The trophy was designed by Tokyo-based firm Tobi and made by Tanihata.	Inactive
	Shizuoka Prefecture Agriculture, Forestry and Fisheries Promotion Association Chairman's Award	A conical trophy with a golden top and a silver base engraved with waves.	Shizuoka Prefecture Agriculture, Forestry and Fisheries Promotion Association	1988	Came with a year supply of tea. Awarded during the Tokyo tournaments from 1988 to 1999.	Inactive
	Bovet Award	A clock hosting a small watch, mounted on a red base.	Bovet Fleurier Japan	2006		Inactive
	Kokubun Metropolitan Cup	A trophy made up of 24 stacked cans	Kokubu Metropolitan Area Co., Ltd.	2025	The company specializes in the wholesale of alcoholic beverages and food. Since its flagship products come in cans, it was decided to use this design for the trophy. The trophy was introduced for the first time at the January 2026 tournament, although the company had been awarding prizes since May 2025.	Active
Only in Osaka
	Yoshimoto Kogyo Award	The trophy is a calligraphy painting representing the kanji 笑, meaning laugh.	Yoshimoto Kogyo	2012	Trophy awarded to commemorate 90 years of cooperation between the company and the Japanese sumo association. Yoshimoto Kogyo had a history of sending comedians to the tournaments venues and making donations during the pre-war Osaka-sumo era. Comes with a free annual pass for the Namba Grand Kagetsu Theatre. The trophy is usually awarded by entertainment celebrities.	Active
	Tozai-kai Championship Flag	A championship flag.	Japan Sumo Association's East and West Association (tozai-kai)		A trophy awarded by an organisation of patrons of the Osaka sumo tournament founded in March 1937. Members of the tozai-kai are recognizable by the brown happi they wear ringside.	Active
	Japan Mint President's Cup	A cup with dragons serving as handles. The cup is supported by pieces calling back the colour tassels of the suspended roof above the dohyō.	Japan Mint	1996	First awarded at the March tournaments of 1996 and 1997. The winning wrestlers also receive their portrait engraved in a copper plate one year after the tournament.	Active
Only in Nagoya
	Chunichi Shimbun Award	A huge cup lifted by three sumo wrestlers.	Chunichi Shimbun		The trophy is awarded because the Chunichi Shimbun co-hosts the Nagoya tournament.	Active
	CBC TV Award	A golden shachihoko shaped trophy like the emblematic roof ornaments of Nagoya Castle.	Chubu-Nippon Broadcasting			Active
	TTB TV Award	A silver cup with golden shachihoko serving as handles, shaped after the golden roof ornaments of Nagoya Castle.	Tōkai Television Broadcasting			Active
	Mikawa Beef Welfare Council Award	A trophy in the form of an unadorned ox statue.	Mikawa Beef Welfare Council	2023	Awarded for the first time in July 2023, with the aim of promoting Aichi Prefecture's "Mikawa beef" more widely. Comes with 50 kg of Wagyu beef.	Active
Only in Fukuoka
	RKB Mainichi Broadcasting Award	A large cup resembling a sakazuki.	RKB Mainichi Broadcasting			Active
	Yamecha Tea Promotion Association Award (and green box)	The trophy measures approximately 1 m high and weighs 20 kg (44 lb). Presented with a green box.	Yamecha Tea Promotion Association	1983	Comes with a supply of Yamecha tea.	Active
	KBC Award	A red cup with golden kanji reading yūshō (優勝) written on it.	Kyushu Asahi Broadcasting			Inactive
	WHITE HORSE gifts	A box of 3 magnum size bottles of scotch whisky.	White Horse Japan	1983		Inactive

== Once a year trophies ==
With the last tournament of the year, the Japan Sumo Association have a tradition of awarding special prizes for the wrestlers who have the most victories in the year. Trophies are also awarded by sports magazines as part of a sponsorship and to show the value of sumo as a sporting competition in its own right.

Photo	Name	Description	Awarded by	Awarded since	Note	Status
	Nishinippon Shimbun Award	A large silver trophy with a height of approximately 98 cm (3 ft 2 1/2 in), a maximum diameter of approximately 40 cm (1 ft 3 1/2 in) and a weight of more than 20 kg (44 lb). Originally, the names of the wrestlers who won the trophy were on plaques attached to the foot of the trophy but this is no longer the case.	Nishinippon Shimbun	1957	Awarded to the wrestler who has won the most wins of the year.	Active
	Hochi Wrestler of the Year Award	Small silver trophy with an eagle on top.	Hochi Shimbun	1958	Awarded by a committee based on the quality of sumo, the number of wins among others. Decided at the end of the year but awarded on January of the following year. Although it is sometimes confused with the "Nishinippon Shimbun Award", the two are completely different rewards as the Nishinippon award does not take into account the content of the sumo wrestling and winners will be determined solely by the number of wins.	Active
	Best Makuuchi Newcomer Award	A plaque with an eagle resembling a special prize plaque.	Chunichi Sports & Tokyo Chunichi Sports	1964	A trophy awarded among the makuuchi newcomers, given to the wrestler who showed the best performance throughout the year. Newly-arrived rikishi from the previous year who have been in the makuuchi for less than two tournaments are also eligible for the award. If there is no suitable candidate, the trophy is not awarded.	Active
	Raiden Award	A wooden plaque with a black handprint.	Yomiuri Shimbun	1955	Established to commemorate the publication of the magazine "Grand Sumo" and the serialization of the novel "Raiden" by Ozaki Shirō (1898-1964). Awarded at the end of the year to the wrestler under sekiwake with the most wins in makuuchi. Named after Raiden Tameemon, it's the only trophy to bear the name of a wrestler. It ceased to be awarded in 1965.	Inactive

== Charity events ==
Photo	Name	Description	Awarded by	Awarded since	Note	Status
	All Japan Rikishi Championship's Chosen Badge (and championship banner)	A golden plaque made in an arm band.	Meiji Shrine		Only awarded during a Meiji Shrine sponsored exhibition event (Meiji Jingu Annual Festival Celebration) at the Ryōgoku Kokugikan in October.	Active
	Fuji TV trophy	A silver trophy with a little gunbai on top of it.	Fuji TV		Only awarded during the Fuji Television Grand Sumo Tournament event at the Ryōgoku Kokugikan in February.	Active

== International tour ==
Photo	Name	Description	Awarded by	Awarded since	Note	Status
	Bercy sumo tournament award	A small cup.	Mayor of Paris	1995	Awarded to Akebono during an exhibition tournament at the Bercy Accor Arena in Paris.	Inactive
	Korean Grand Sumo Tournament award	A celadon vase.	Mayor of Seoul	2004	Awarded to Asashōryū during the first exhibition tournament held in Korea since the end of World War II at the Jangchung Arena in Seoul.	Inactive
	Beijing Grand Sumo Tournament award	A golden eagle.	Mayor of Beijing	2004	Awarded to Asashōryū during an exhibition tournament at the Capital Indoor Stadium in Beijing.	Inactive

== Particular trophies and prizes ==
Photo	Name	Description	Awarded by	Awarded in	Note	Status
	Dohyō King Statue	The statue represents a large number "63" surrounded by 12 dolphins in the shape of an unfinished ring. A plate on the pedestal reads "Dohyō King". The trophy measures 80 cm (2 ft 7 1/2 in) in height and 70 cm (2 ft 3 1/2 in) in width, and is said to be made of duralumin, gold, silver, and platinum. Produced by Miyata Ryōhei, president of Tokyo University of the Arts and member of the Yokozuna Deliberation Council.	Yokozuna Deliberation Council	2011	Awarded to Hakuhō acknowledging his achievement of a 63-bout winning streak, the second highest in sumo recorded history.	Inactive
	Morinaga's Wrestler of the Day Award	Three wrestlers are selected daily by a majority of the popular vote. Each wrestler receives a cash prize and toffee sweets.	Morinaga & Company	1951	Morinaga began awarding a popular prize in 1951, making it one of the first companies to award a prize in modern sumo history. The prize was however interrupted in 1985 with the Glico Morinaga case and between 2020 and 2024 because of the COVID-19 pandemic.	Active

== See also ==
- Glossary of sumo terms
- Sanshō special prizes
- List of sumo tournament top division champions
- List of sumo record holders

== Notes ==
1. Only seven prime ministers have awarded the Prime Minister's Cup.

- Junichiro Koizumi to Takanohana in May 2001 and Asashōryū in November 2005
- Tarō Asō to Asashōryū in January 2009 and Harumafuji in May 2009
- Yukio Hatoyama to Asashōryū in September 2009
- Naoto Kan to Hakuhō in September 2010
- Yoshihiko Noda to Hakuhō in September 2011 and Harumafuji in September 2012
- Shinzo Abe to Harumafuji in January 2013, Hakuhō in May 2014 and Asanoyama in May 2019
- Shigeru Ishiba to Hōshōryū in January 2025
