= Asashōryū Akinori =

Mongolian former sumo wrestler (born 1980)

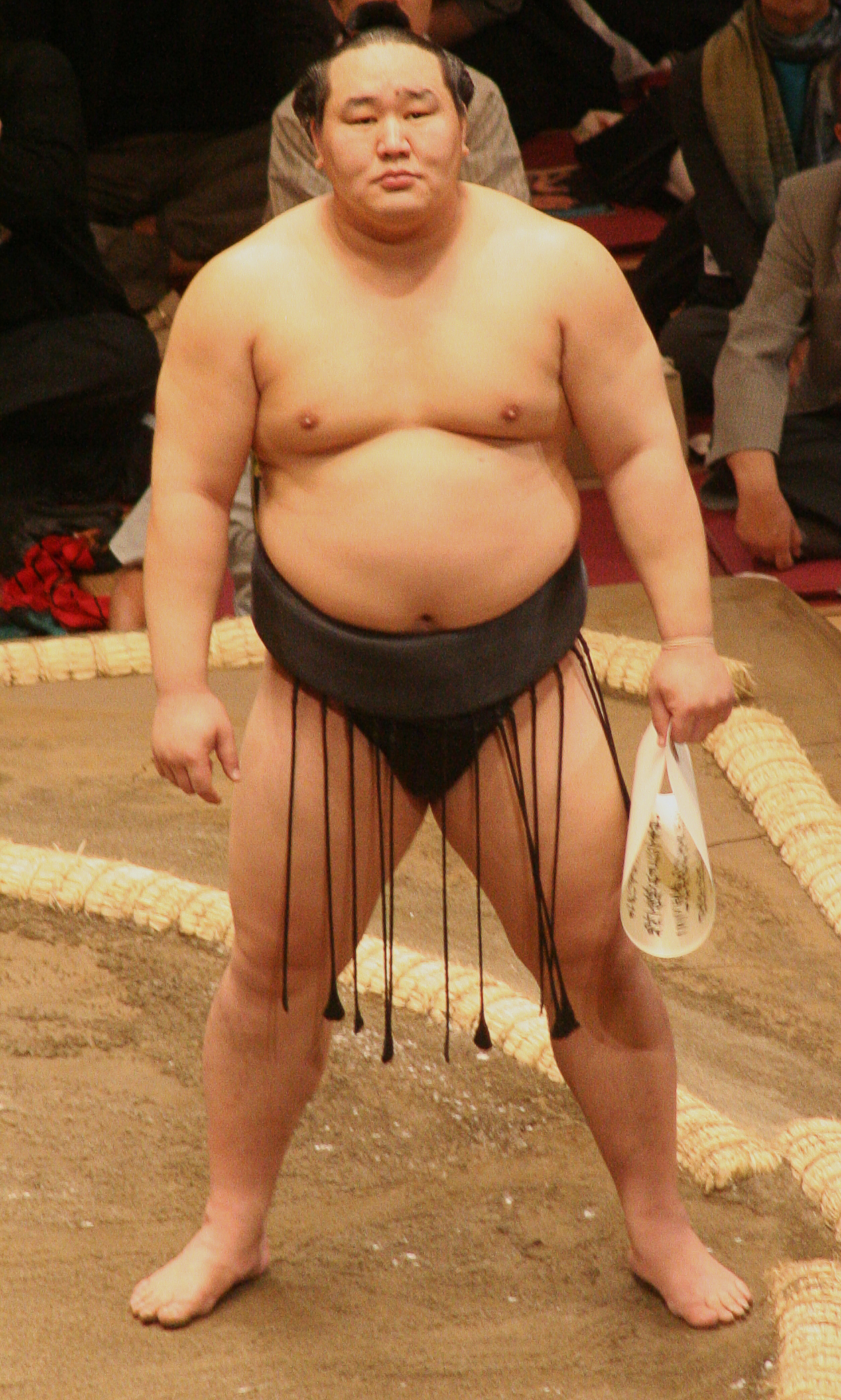
- Asashōryū in the ring during the May 2009 sumo tournament

Personal information
- Native name: 朝青龍 明徳
- Born: Dolgorsuren Dagvadorj; 27 September 1980 (age 46) Ulaanbaatar, Mongolian People's Republic
- Height: 184 cm (72 in)
- Weight: 148 kg (326 lb; 23.3 st)
- Website: https://ameblo.jp/asashoryu-yokozuna/

Sport
- Sport: Sumo
- Retired: 6 February 2010
- Heya: Wakamatsu → Takasago
- Record: 669–173–76
- Debut: January 1999
- Highest rank: Yokozuna (January 2003)
- Championships: 25 (Makuuchi); 1 (Makushita); 1 (Sandanme); 1 (Jonidan)
- Special Prizes: Outstanding Performance (3); Fighting Spirit (3)
- Gold Stars: 1 (Musashimaru)
- Updated on February 2015

Asashōryū Akinori (Japanese: 朝青龍 明徳; born 27 September 1980, as Dolgorsürengiin Dagvadorj, Mongolian Cyrillic: Долгорсүрэнгийн Дагвадорж; [tɔɮgɔrsʊːrengiːn tagw̜atɔrt͡ʃ]) is a Mongolian former professional sumo wrestler (rikishi). He was the 68th yokozuna in the history of the sport in Japan, and in January 2003 he became the first Mongolian to reach sumo's highest rank. He was one of the most successful yokozuna ever. In 2005, he became the first wrestler to win all six official tournaments (honbasho) in a single year. Over his entire career, he won 25 top division tournament championships, placing him fourth on the all-time list. He is often referred to as one of the greatest sumo wrestlers of all time.

From 2004 until 2007, Asashōryū was sumo's sole yokozuna between the retirement of Musashimaru and the promotion of fellow Mongolian Hakuhō, and was criticized at times by the media and the Japan Sumo Association for not upholding the standards of behaviour expected of a holder of such a prestigious rank. He became the first yokozuna in history to be suspended from competition in August 2007 when he participated in a charity football match in his home country despite having withdrawn from a regional sumo tour claiming injury. After a career filled with a multitude of other controversies, both on and off the dohyō, his career was cut short when he retired from sumo in February 2010 after allegations that he assaulted a man outside a Tokyo nightclub.

== Early life and sumo background ==
Asashōryū comes from an ethnic Mongol family with a strong background in Mongolian wrestling, with his father and two of his elder brothers all achieving high ranks in the sport. He also trained in judo in Mongolia. He originally came to Japan as an exchange student, together with his friend, the future Asasekiryū, where they attended Meitoku Gijuku High School in Kōchi Prefecture. They trained together at the sumo club there.

== Early career ==
He was recruited by the former ōzeki Asashio of the Wakamatsu stable (now Takasago stable), who gave him the shikona of Asashōryū, literally "morning blue dragon", Asa being a regular prefix in the Wakamatsu stable. The second part of the shikona, Akinori, is an alternative reading of Meitoku, the name of his high school. He made his professional debut in January 1999. By September he made his third division debut, finding himself in a rare seven-way playoff, winning two initially, but then losing two versus the two last rivals standing (tomoesen), ultimately having to spend a year in the third tier.

At that time, fellow Mongolians Kyokushūzan and Kyokutenhō were in the top division and stars back in their home country, but Asashōryū was quick to overtake them both. He attained elite sekitori status in September 2000 by winning promotion to the jūryō division, and reached the top makuuchi division just two tournaments later in January 2001. In May 2001, he made his san'yaku debut at komusubi rank and earned his first sanshō special prize, for Outstanding Performance.

In 2002, Asashōryū put together back-to-back records of 11–4, 11–4 and 12–3 and was promoted to sumo's second highest rank of ōzeki in July. In November 2002, he took his first top division tournament championship (yūshō) with a 14–1 record. It took Asashōryū only 23 tournaments from his professional debut to win his first top division title, the fastest ever at the time. In January 2003, he won his second straight championship. Shortly after the tournament, Asashōryū was granted the title of yokozuna, the highest rank in sumo. His promotion coincided with the retirement of the injury-plagued Takanohana, the last active Japanese born yokozuna until Kisenosato in January 2017.

== Yokozuna career ==
Yokozuna dohyou iri

Yokozuna career

While his first tournament as yokozuna ended in a disappointing 10–5 record, Asashōryū won a further twenty-three tournaments. Combined with his two yūshō as an ōzeki, he had twenty-five career championships in the top division. This puts him in fourth place on the all-time list, behind only Hakuhō, Taihō, and Chiyonofuji.

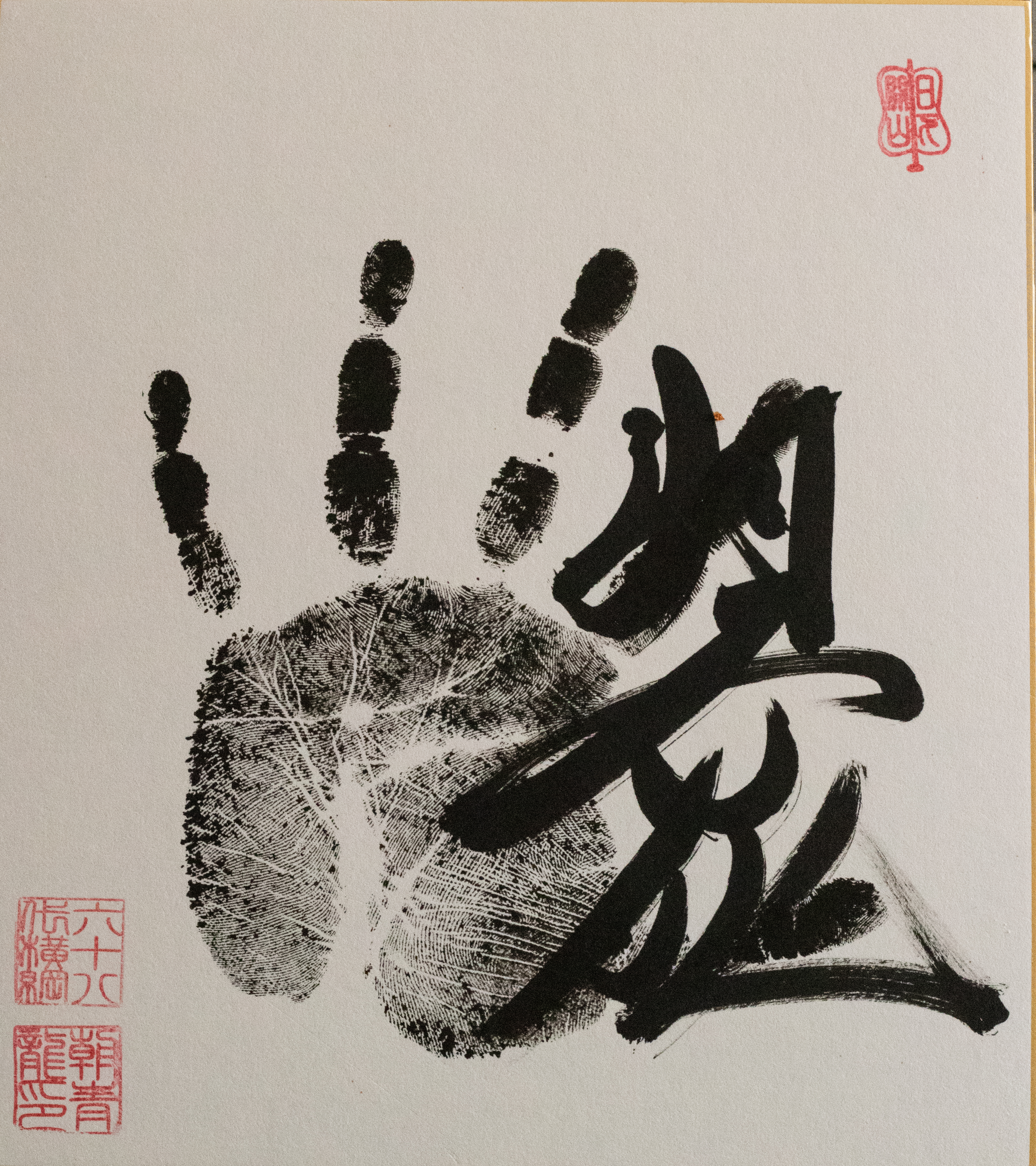
Yokozuna Asashoryu original tegata (handprint & signature)

=== 2003 ===
Asashōryū nominally shared the yokozuna rank with Musashimaru, but in fact his rival only fought a handful of bouts in 2003 due to injury. The two did not meet in competition all year. Asashōryū won his first championship as a yokozuna in May 2003 and came back from an injury sustained in the July tournament to win his third title of the year in September. Musashimaru announced his retirement in November, leaving Asashōryū as sumo's only yokozuna.

=== 2004 ===
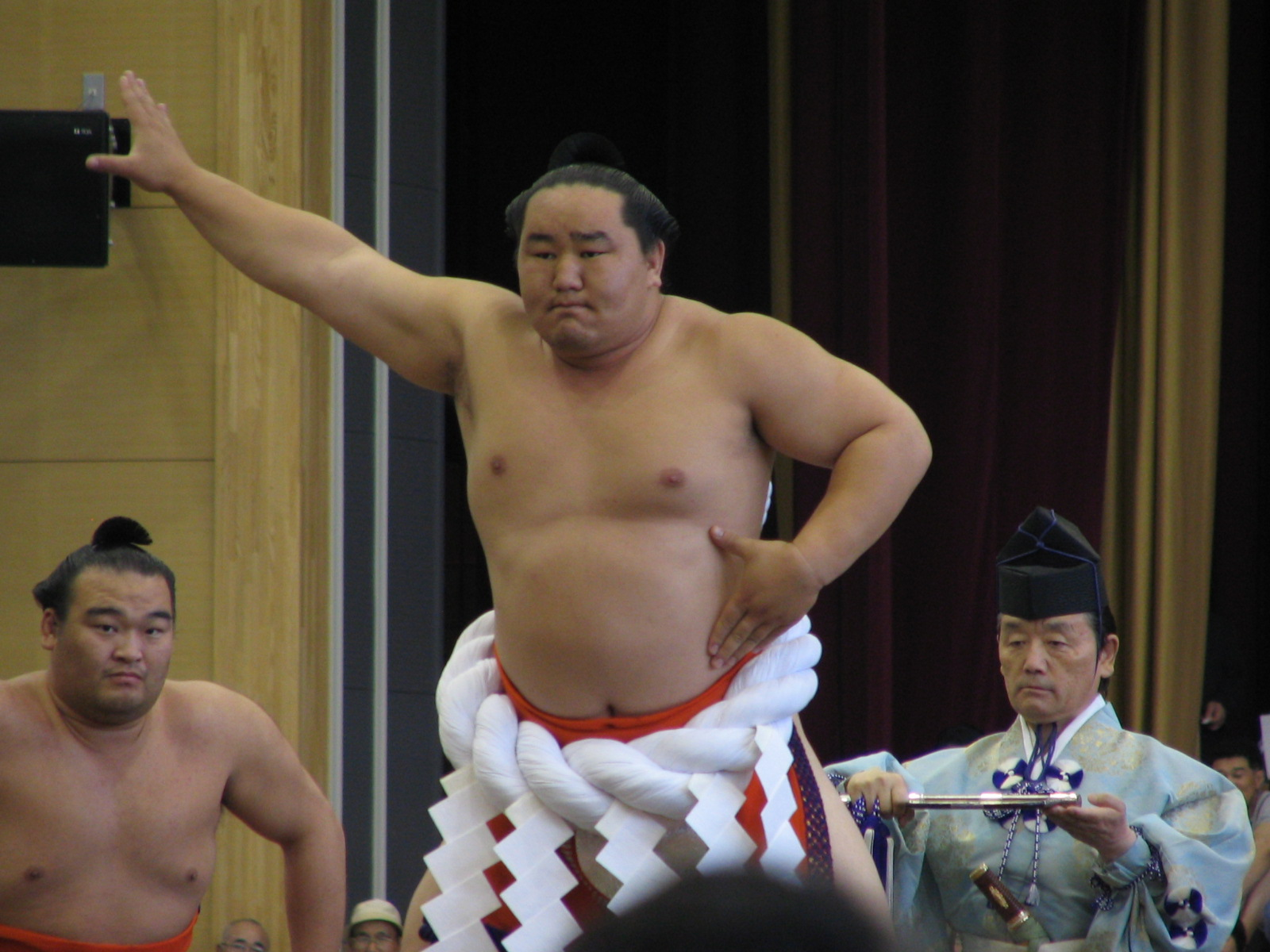
Performing the dohyō-iri in 2004

Asashōryū began 2004 with two consecutive perfect 15–0 tournament wins (zensho-yūshō) in January and March. Nobody had attained a zensho-yūshō since 1996; yet Asashōryū went on to add three more such titles after 2004, for a career total of five. At that time only Taihō, with eight, and Chiyonofuji and Kitanoumi with seven, had recorded more 15–0 scores. His unbeaten run continued into the first five days of the May 2004 tournament, giving him a winning streak of 35 bouts in total, the longest run since Chiyonofuji's 53 in 1988. Although he was then upset by maegashira Hokutōriki, he gained revenge by defeating Hokutōriki in a playoff on the final day to claim the championship. On 27 November 2004, Asashōryū became the first wrestler to win five tournaments in a year since Chiyonofuji achieved the feat in 1986, and won his ninth Emperor's Cup. Asashōryū's below average 9–6 score in the September basho of 2004, the only one he did not win, was attributed in part to the official ceremony for his marriage, which was held in August 2004 (although he had actually married in December 2002). The hectic social round that inevitably follows Japanese weddings affected his pre-tournament preparations, as it prevented him from doing any training.

=== 2005 ===
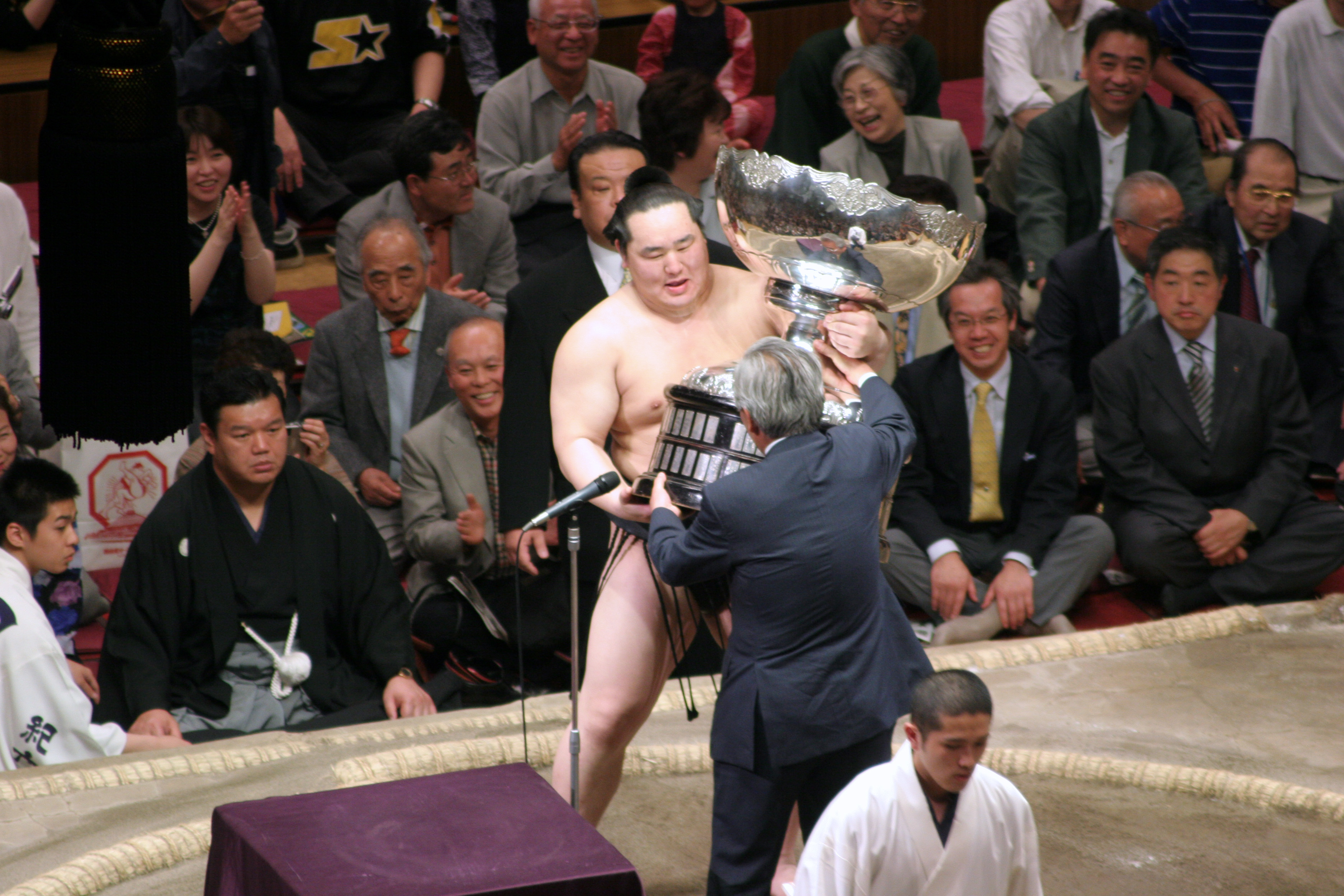
Asashōryū receives the Prime Minister's Award for winning the May 2005 tournament.

He continued to dominate sumo in 2005, becoming the first wrestler ever to win all six honbasho (sumo tournaments) in the same year. The great yokozuna Taihō achieved the feat of six consecutive tournament victories twice, but never in a calendar year. Asashōryū lost only six bouts all year (0–1–0–2–2–1). One of those rare losses came on 11 September 2005, at the start of the September tournament when he dropped his first Day 1 bout during his tenure as yokozuna. On 26 November 2005, a visibly emotional Asashōryū wept after winning his eighty-third bout of the year, (surpassing Kitanoumi's record set in 1978) and clinching the tournament at the same time. The six championships of 2005 (including two more 15–0 wins in January and May) combined with his victory from the final tournament of 2004, meant Asashōryū became the first man in sumo history to win seven consecutive tournament championships.

=== 2006 ===
Asashōryū's consecutive basho streak came to an end in January 2006, when ōzeki Tochiazuma took the first tournament championship of the year. Asashōryū's performance in January was a surprisingly poor 11–4 but he successfully rebounded by winning the March tournament. However, his six losses in those tournaments matched his loss total for all of 2005. In the May tournament, he sustained an injury to the ligaments in his elbow on the second day falling out of the ring in a surprising loss to Wakanosato and was visibly slow to rise from the ground. He was absent from the tournament the next day and later released a statement confirming he was withdrawing from the tournament. Doctors told him he would not be able to compete for two months, which meant he would miss the July tournament as well. However, Asashōryū was ready by the start of the July tournament and won with a 14–1 record. In the following tournament, Asashōryū won his eighteenth career title with a 13–2 record. He also won the final tournament of 2006 for his nineteenth career title, the fifth he has won with a perfect 15–0 record.

=== 2007 ===
In January 2007, Asashōryū posted a 14–1 record, his fourth straight championship since returning from injury, and became the fifth man to win twenty career championships. In March, he dropped his first two bouts but then won thirteen in a row for a 13–2 score. However, this was not enough to win the title—he lost a playoff for the first time in his career, to fellow Mongolian Hakuhō. In May he turned in a below par 10–5 record, losing to all four ōzeki and maegashira Aminishiki (although he appeared to be carrying an injury). Hakuhō won this tournament as well and was promoted to yokozuna immediately afterwards. Asashōryū had been the sole yokozuna for a total of 21 tournaments since the retirement of Musashimaru in November 2003 – the longest period of time in sumo history. In July he lost to Aminishiki once again on the opening day but rallied to win the next fourteen bouts, taking his 21st title with a 14–1 record. He was suspended by the Sumo Association from the next two tournaments (see below).

=== 2008 ===
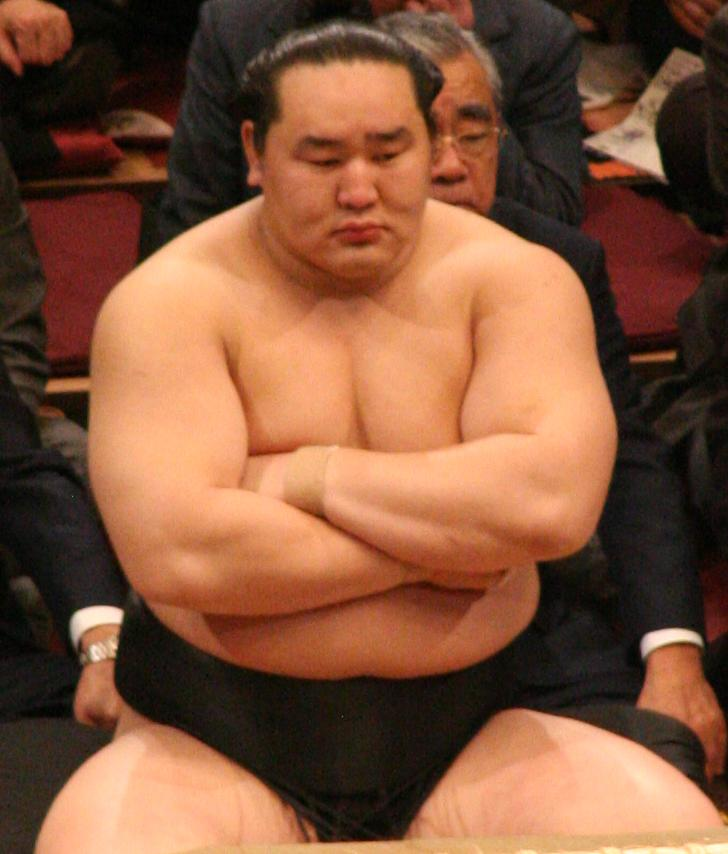
Asashōryū in January 2008

Asashōryū returned to tournaments in January 2008. On the final day, he faced Hakuhō in a battle of 13–1 yokozuna, but was defeated, giving him a final record of 13–2. In March the two yokozuna faced off for the title again on the last day, marking only the fifth time in the last 30 years that two yokozuna have contested the championship on the last day of two consecutive tournaments. In this rematch, Asashōryū was the victor, winning his 22nd title, thus equalling Takanohana's haul of tournament championships.

In the May tournament he lost to Kisenosato on the opening day. He injured his back in this match and subsequent losses to Kotoōshū (the eventual winner of the tournament) and Chiyotaikai put him out of contention.

Asashōryū got off to a bad start in the July tournament by losing to Toyonoshima on the first day. After a second loss to maegashira Tochinonada on day five, he pulled out of the tournament on the sixth day citing pain in his elbow. The September tournament unfolded in a similarly poor fashion. After compiling a lacklustre 5–4 record through the first nine days, Asashōryū forfeited his tenth-day match to maegashira Gōeidō and withdrew. He had elbow pain, and presented a medical certificate.

He returned to Mongolia in October 2008, staying until shortly before the tournament in Kyushu in November, which he did not enter. He stated that he would not withdraw for a third time partway through a tournament, and suggested that he would retire if his comeback proved unsuccessful.

=== 2009 ===
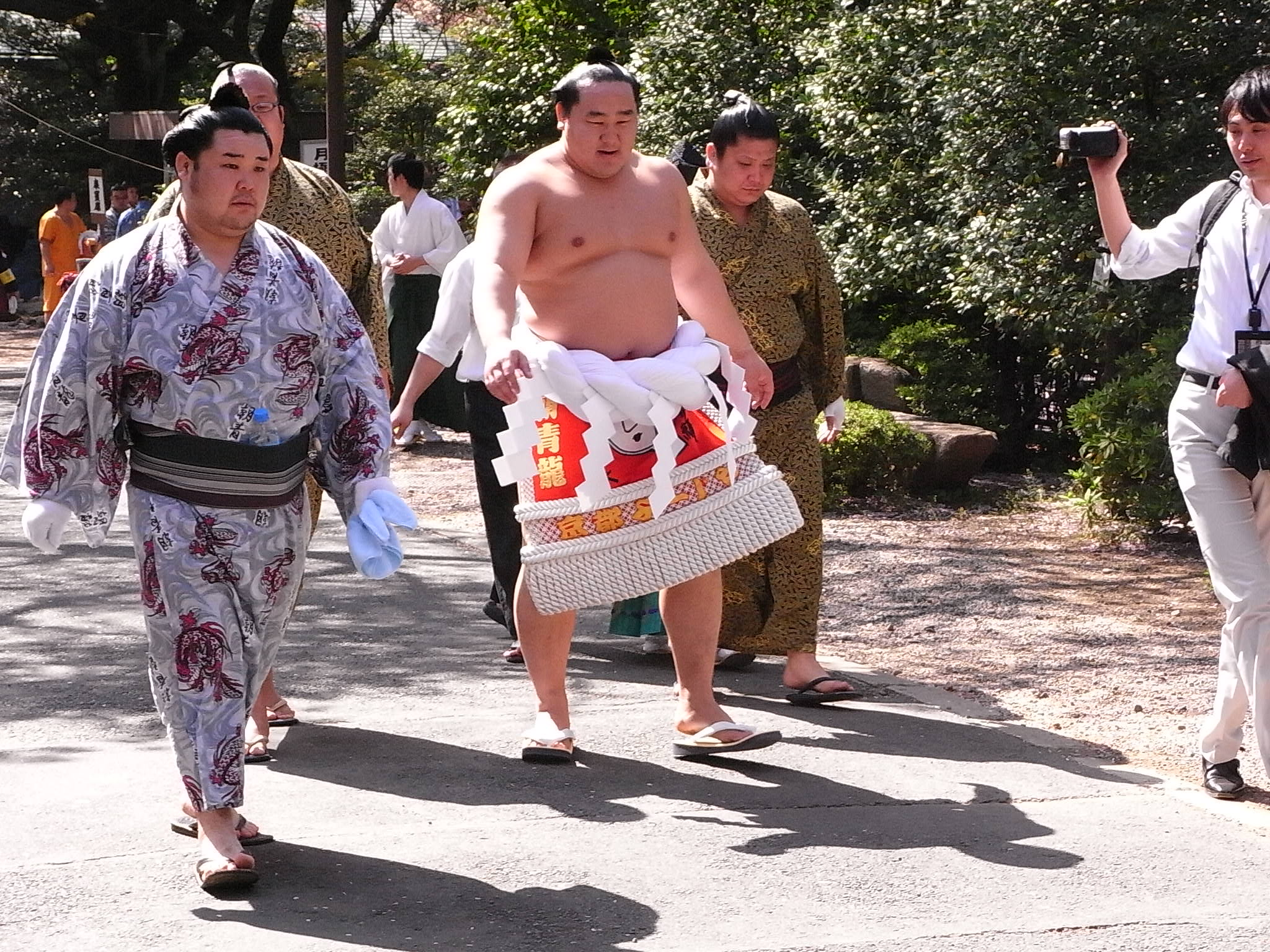
Asashōryū in the dedication sumo wrestling at Yasukuni Shrine (10 April 2009)

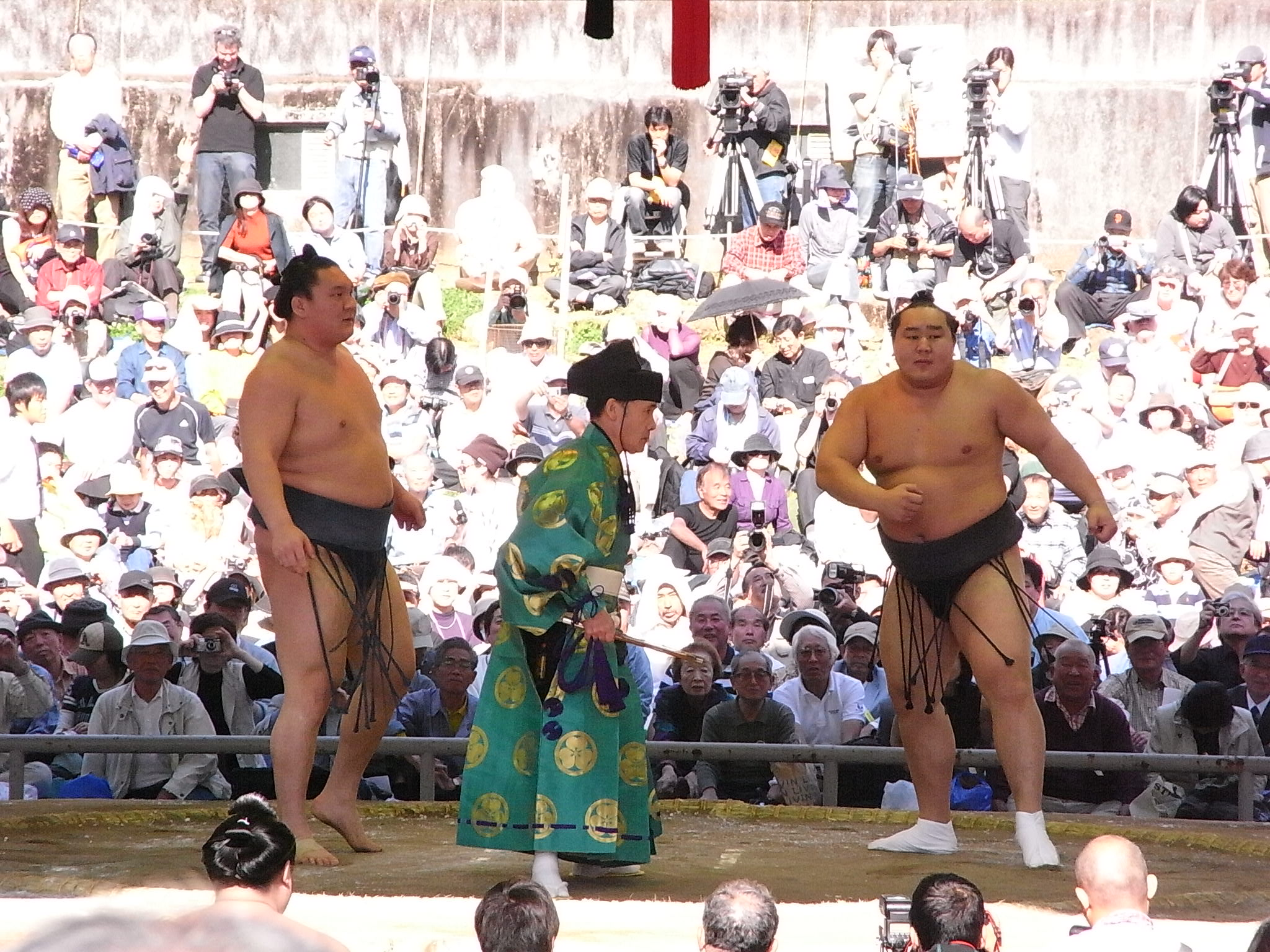
Asashōryū and Hakuhō Shō at the Yasukuni Shrine Dedicated Sumo (10 April 2009)

The January 2009 honbasho, Asashōryū's first full tournament since May 2008, was a remarkable success. He won his first fourteen matches, losing only on the last day to Hakuhō. He then won the resulting playoff to earn his 23rd championship and pass Takanohana on the all-time list to become the fourth ever wrestler to have won 23 tournaments (the other three being Taihō, Kitanoumi and Chiyonofuji). His victory came exactly twenty years after yokozuna Hokutoumi also returned from three tournaments out to win the championship with a 14–1 record. Sumo Association head Musashigawa described Asashōryū's comeback as "amazing." Ticket sales and television ratings showed a marked increase as his winning run continued. After his playoff win Asashōryū announced to the crowd, "Everyone, thank you very much. Really. I am back."

In the following tournament in March he went undefeated for the first nine days but then lost to three of the five ōzeki over the next five days, putting him out of contention for the championship. He also lost his final day match to Hakuhō to finish at 11–4. In the May tournament he lost early to Aminishiki, then won ten in a row before falling to Harumafuji on Day 14. He again lost to Hakuhō, on the final day, finishing at 12–3.

Asashōryū returned to Mongolia after the May tournament to receive treatment for a bruised chest suffered in his defeat to Harumafuji. In June he received the Hero of Labour Award from outgoing Mongolian President Nambaryn Enkhbayar, the highest government award in Mongolia and equivalent to the Japanese People's Honour Award. He performed poorly in the July tournament with a 10–5 record, his worst finish in just over two years.

He damaged ligaments in his right knee during a regional tour of Akita in August 2009 (the first time he had injured his knee), hampering his preparations for the September tournament. Despite this, he won his first 14 matches, before finally losing to Hakuhō, leaving both wrestlers at 14–1. Asashōryū would win the resulting playoff to win his 24th yūshō, tying him with Kitanoumi for third on the all-time yūshō list. The triumph took place on his 29th birthday. He finished on 11–4 in the Kyushu tournament in November, losing his last four matches.

=== 2010 ===
In the January 2010 tournament, which was to prove to be the last of his career, Asashōryū clinched his 25th yūshō on Day 14 after beating Harumafuji to go 13–1, two wins ahead of Hakuhō on 11–3. He was however beaten by Hakuhō on the final day for the seventh straight time in regulation matches, and he finished on 13–2.

== Controversy ==
=== Match-fixing speculation and lawsuits ===
In January 2007, Shūkan Gendai, a weekly tabloid magazine, reported that Asashōryū had paid opponents about ¥800,000 ($10,000) per fight to allow him to win the previous November 2006 tournament with a perfect score. Asashōryū denied these claims in court on 3 October 2008, during the first ever court appearance by a yokozuna. He appeared as part of a lawsuit brought by the Japan Sumo Association and about 30 other wrestlers seeking around ¥660 million ($8.12 million) from Shūkan Gendai's publisher, Kodansha Ltd. He said the allegations were "complete lies ... I am very sad and disgusted." Also appearing in court, in defence of the magazine, was former wrestler Itai, who had made similar allegations of bout-fixing in 2000 regarding his own career. Itai suggested that Asashōryū's win over Chiyotaikai in the November 2006 tournament was an example of a fixed match.

On 26 March 2009, the Tokyo District Court ordered Kodansha, the publisher of the magazine, and Yorimasa Takeda, the freelance writer of the articles, to pay ¥42.90 million ($437,000) in damages, believed to be the highest award for libel damages against a magazine in Japanese history. Chief judge Yasushi Nakamura stated that the reporting was "slipshod in the extreme."

=== Suspension ===
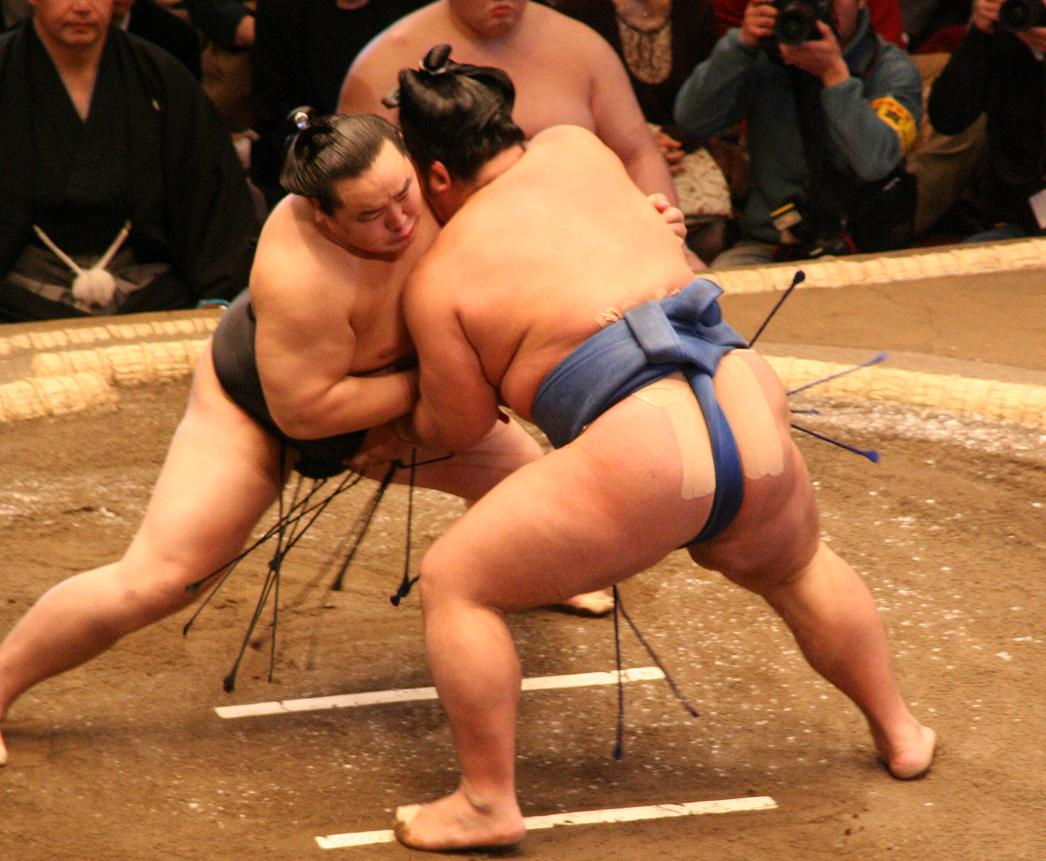
Asashōryū taking on Kotoshōgiku in his first fight after his suspension

After his tournament victory in July 2007, Asashōryū decided to skip the regional summer tour of Tōhoku and Hokkaidō beginning on 3 August because of injury. The medical forms submitted to the Japan Sumo Association indicated that injuries to his left elbow and a stress fracture in his lower back would require six weeks of rest to heal. However, he was then seen on television participating in a football match for charity with Hidetoshi Nakata in his homeland of Mongolia. He was reported to have done so at the request of the Japanese Foreign Ministry and the Mongolian government. However, the suggestion that he had exaggerated the extent of his injuries to avoid his duties on the exhibition tour caused a media storm.

Asashōryū was ordered to return to Japan and on 1 August 2007, the Sumo Association suspended him for the upcoming September tournament as well as the next one in November, the first time in the sport's history that an active yokozuna has been suspended from a main tournament. They also announced that Asashōryū and his stablemaster Takasago would have their salaries cut by 30% for the next four months. He was also instructed to restrict his movements to his home, his stable, and the hospital. Isenoumi, a Director of the Sumo Association, called Asashōryū's behaviour "a serious indiscretion. Given that a yokozuna should act as a good example for the other wrestlers, this punishment for his action is appropriate." It was the most severe punishment ever imposed on a yokozuna since the Grand Tournament system was adopted over 80 years ago. Asashōryū responded by saying he would get his injuries treated and prepare for the winter regional tour and the January 2008 tournament. However, his stablemaster reported that Asashōryū was finding the severity of the punishment difficult to deal with, and two doctors from the Sumo Association diagnosed him as suffering from acute stress disorder, and then dissociative disorder. On 28 August he was allowed to return to Mongolia for treatment. After recuperation and onsen treatment, he returned to Japan on 30 November 2007, apologising for his actions at a press conference.

=== Assault allegations and subsequent retirement ===
During the January 2010 tournament, a tabloid magazine claimed Asashōryū punched his personal manager after getting drunk during a night out in downtown Nishiazabu. After the tournament Asashōryū was reprimanded by Japan Sumo Association (JSA) head Musashigawa, and he apologised once again for his behaviour. However, it subsequently emerged that it was not his manager but a restaurant employee who was attacked, reportedly sustaining a broken nose. The man did not file a report with the police, and on 31 January 2010, Asashōryū told the authorities that he had reached a settlement with him. Despite this, the police did not rule out the possibility of questioning Asashōryū about the assault.

Subsequently, on 4 February 2010, he announced his decision to retire, after discussing the matter at a meeting with the Board of Directors of the Sumo Association. He stated, "I feel heavy responsibility as a yokozuna that I have caused trouble to so many people. I am the only person who can put an end to it all. I think it's my destiny that I retire like this." Asashōryū did not comment directly on the brawl, except to say that what actually happened was "quite different" to media reports. "I decided to step down to bring this to a closure."

Asashōryū referred to criticism for not showing hinkaku (dignity) as a yokozuna. "Everybody talks about dignity, but when I went into the ring, I felt fierce like a devil." Asked what his most memorable bout was, he chose his first win over Musashimaru in May 2001, with his parents watching him.

JSA Chief Director Musashigawa revealed that directors were debating on that day whether to punish Asashōryū. "He felt compelled to resign for misconduct that was inexcusable, and the board accepted. I want to apologize to all of the fans and to the person injured in the incident." The Yokozuna Deliberation Council had recommended his retirement, and would have pressed for his dismissal if he had not chosen to go.

In Mongolia, there was anger at the news. One high-ranking Mongolian official accused the Sumo Association of using the incident as an excuse to get rid of Asashōryū before he could reach Taihō's 32 tournament victories. "I feel that they did not want him to break the record for most titles. This behavior is unjust. The Mongolian people disapprove." The Zuunii Medee newspaper called for sumo broadcasts in Mongolia to be suspended. Reacting to the tense mood among the Mongolian public, a spokesman at the Foreign Ministry of Mongolia issued a statement that the "resignation of Asashōryū will have no influence to the friendship between Mongolian and Japanese citizens." and he requested people stay calm. Reaction in Japan was more mixed, with some of the public saying the yokozuna had to go while others said they would miss him. News media compared his case with earlier yokozuna Maedayama who was forced to resign in 1949 after dropping out of a tournament claiming illness but subsequently photographed at a baseball game. Both his stablemaster and the Sumo Association received criticism for their handling of this incident and Asashōryū in general.

As Asashōryū never obtained Japanese citizenship, he was not eligible to stay in the sumo world as an oyakata, or coach. He was, however, entitled to a formal retirement ceremony, or danpatsu-shiki, at the Ryōgoku Kokugikan and was also given a retirement allowance by the Sumo Association, believed to be around ¥120 million ($1.34 million).

Asashōryū gave a press conference in Mongolia on 11 March, and denied committing any "act of violence," but said he did not regret his decision to retire. He claimed it was "an undeniable fact" that there were people within the Sumo Association "trying to push me out of sumo" and that he could have gone on to win 30 or more tournament titles. Asked about rumours that he would enter mixed martial arts, he replied, "I haven't really thought about what to do next." He refused to take any questions from Japanese reporters.

He was questioned voluntarily by investigators in May, and reportedly said that his hand "may have struck" the man, but he denied assault. In July police reported him to the public prosecutors. His former stablemaster Takasago said if Asashōryū was indicted then his retirement ceremony may be cancelled. However, the event went ahead as planned on 3 October, with around 380 dignitaries taking turns in snipping his oichiomage or topknot before Takasago made the final cut. Asashōryū said to the 10,000 fans at the Kokugikan, "In another life as a Japanese, I would like to become a yokozuna with Japanese spirit ... I want to show everyone that I can become a better person."

=== Other events ===
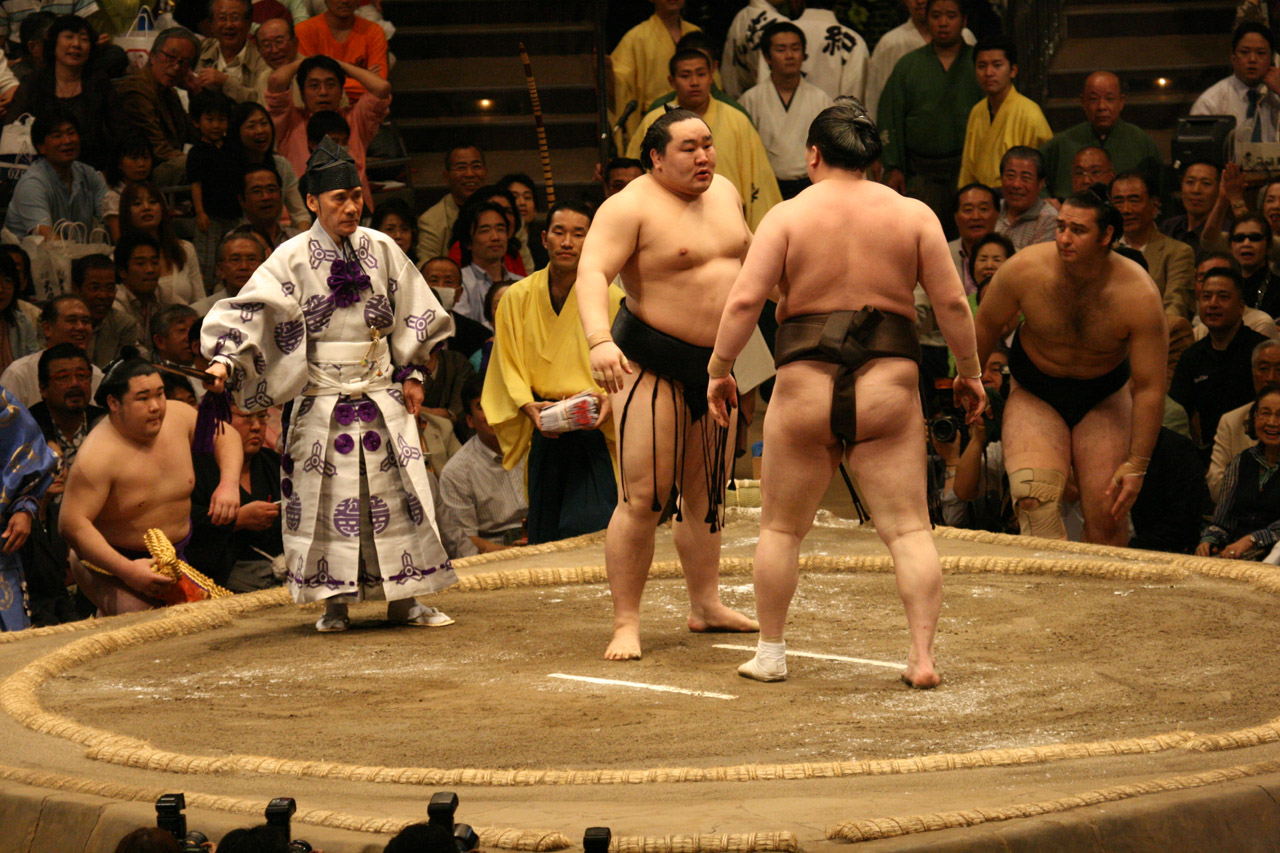
Asashōryū and Hakuhō glare at each other after a bad-tempered match on the last day of the May 2008 tournament

Asashōryū received criticism from Sumo Association officials and the media throughout his yokozuna career for various other infractions of the strict code of conduct expected of top sumo wrestlers, both on the dohyō and off it. His breaches of etiquette during tournament bouts ranged from merely accepting the prize money with the wrong hand, and raising his arms in victory after clinching the championship, to giving opponents an extra shove after the bout was already over (such as Hakuhō in May 2008), and appealing to judges to overturn the referee's decision. In July 2003, he pulled on fellow Mongolian Kyokushūzan's mage (traditional Japanese top knot) during their bout on day five of the tournament, resulting in an immediate hansoku-make, or disqualification. He was the first yokozuna to be disqualified from a bout. They reportedly brawled in the communal bath afterwards, and Asashōryū was also accused of breaking the wing mirror of Kyokushūzan's car. Some Japanese fans called on him to "go back to Mongolia" after this incident. He also had an uneasy relationship with his stablemaster Takasago. In July 2004, he apologized after a row with Takasago over his wedding arrangements resulted in him being seen drunk in public and damaging stable property, and his tendency to return to Mongolia without informing his stablemaster led to embarrassments like being unable to attend the funeral of Takasago stable's previous head coach Fujinishiki in December 2003. He was also sometimes seen in public in a business suit or in casual dress instead of the traditional kimono that wrestlers are expected to wear.

== Post-sumo career ==
Immediately after his retirement from sumo there was speculation that Asashōryū would switch to mixed martial arts, and he was reported to be forming an MMA camp for Mongolian athletes. However, he instead became a businessman. Asashōryū had held business interests in Mongolia whilst still active in sumo, launching a family holding company as early as 2003. Based in Ulaanbaatar and investing exclusively inside Mongolia, the company has assets in banking, real estate and mining.

In 2012, his wealth was estimated to be between US$50 and 75 million. He is also active in philanthropy, establishing the Asashoryu Foundation which has supported the Mongolian Olympic team, given scholarships to Mongolian college students studying in Mongolia and Japan, and donated English-language textbooks to schools.

In 2007, Asashōryū bought the National Circus Palace (a 2,000-seat circus building in Ulaanbaatar) through his company, "Asa Consulting". Since then the palace has been renamed to "Asa Tsirk". He became a member of the Mongolian Democratic Party in May 2013. On 3 August 2017, Asashōryū was appointed as a diplomatic advisor and special ambassador to Japan by Mongolian President Khaltmaagiin Battulga.

He returned to Japan in November 2021 and was a spectator during the Kyūshū tournament, during which time he also reunited with the recently retired Hakuhō. On 12 April 2024 his X account (formerly Twitter) stated that he had been admitted in emergency to a Tokyo hospital for unknown reasons. The yokozuna announced that the operation had been a success on the 26th of the same month, without giving any further details about the location of the operation or the severity of his health problem.

In 2025, Asashōryū reconnected with his wrestling past and visited Tokyo in January, on the occasion of his nephew Hōshōryū's promotion as the 74th yokozuna in the sport's history. Due to his complicated relationship with the Sumo Association executives, it was debated for a while whether Asashōryū would be allowed to attend the ceremony at the Meiji Shrine in the audience box reserved for the new yokozuna's relatives. On the day of the ceremony, he was nevertheless present with the family. A few days later, he also attended the consecration of the new building of his former stable (Takasago) after the latter had moved to Honjo, Tokyo.

== Fighting style ==
Asashōryū was a relative lightweight early in his career, weighing just 129 kg (284 lb) in 2001, and relied on speed and technique to compete against often much heavier opponents. However, he gradually put on weight and by 2010 was about 148 kg (326 lb), right on average. In his later career he tended to confront his opponents head on with the intention of out-muscling them. In training, he was reported to do multiple repetitions of biceps curls with 30-kilogram (66 lb) dumb-bells, and whilst in the gym with NHK commentator Hiro Morita in 2008 he reportedly bench pressed 200 kg (441 lb). He had an intense approach to keiko (training), and some high-profile wrestlers avoided training with him, fearing injury.

Asashōryū's favoured techniques according to his Sumo Association profile were migi-yotsu/yori, a left hand outside, right hand inside grip on his opponent's mawashi (belt), and tsuppari, a series of rapid thrusts to the chest. His most common winning kimarite throughout his career were yorikiri (force out), oshidashi (push out), uwatenage (outer arm throw), shitatenage (inner arm throw) and tsukidashi (thrust out). He used 45 different kimarite in his career, a wider range than most wrestlers. In July 2009, he defeated Harumafuji by an "inner thigh throw" or yaguranage, a technique not seen in the top division since 1975. His trademark, however, was tsuriotoshi, or "lifting body slam", a feat of tremendous strength normally only used on much smaller and weaker opponents. In 2004, Asashōryū twice dumped the 158-kilogram (348 lb) Kotomitsuki using this technique.

== Family ==
Asashōryū's brothers were active in other combat sports: Dolgorsürengiin Sumyaabazar was a mixed martial arts fighter, and Dolgorsürengiin Serjbüdee, a professional wrestler, competed in New Japan Pro-Wrestling under the name Blue Wolf (after the Mongolian Blue Wolf legend). All Dolgorsüren brothers have strong backgrounds in Mongolian wrestling.

Asashōryū first met his first wife in high school when they were both 15 years old. They married in 2002 and their reception in Tokyo in 2004 was broadcast live on TV. They divorced in 2009 having been separated for several years. He has a son and a daughter. In July 2020 he announced via Twitter that he was getting married, uploading a picture of himself with his presumed fiancée.

Two of Asashōryū's nephews became professional sumo wrestlers. The most successful, Byambasuren, turned pro in November 2017, joining Tatsunami stable. His shikona (ring name) is Hōshōryū, and he made his first tournament appearance in January 2018. He reached the top division in September 2020. Asashōryū was in the Fukuoka International Center on the 12th day of the November 2021 tournament and saw his nephew lose to Daieishō. He joked that Hōshōryū "should have shown a little more spirit." Hōshōryū has since climbed the ranks, being promoted to the rank of yokozuna in January 2025. In October 2024, another of his nephews, Serjbüdeegiin Luvsangombo (son of Dolgorsürengiin Serjbüdee), joined professional sumo and decided to compete for Shikoroyama stable.

== Career record ==
Asashōryū Akinori
Year	January Hatsu basho, Tokyo	March Haru basho, Osaka	May Natsu basho, Tokyo	July Nagoya basho, Nagoya	September Aki basho, Tokyo	November Kyūshū basho, Fukuoka
1999	(Maezumō)	East Jonokuchi #34; 6–1	West Jonidan #85; 7–0–PP; Champion	West Sandanme #75; 7–0; Champion	East Makushita #53; 6–1–PPPP	East Makushita #27; 6–1
2000	West Makushita #12; 3–4	West Makushita #19; 5–2	West Makushita #9; 6–1	West Makushita #2; 7–0; Champion	East Jūryō #7; 9–6	West Jūryō #3; 11–4
2001	West Maegashira #12; 9–6	East Maegashira #6; 9–6	West Komusubi #1; 8–7; O	East Komusubi #1; 7–8	West Maegashira #1; 10–5; F★	East Komusubi #1; 10–5; F
2002	West Sekiwake #1; 8–7	West Sekiwake #1; 11–4; O	West Sekiwake #1; 11–4; F	East Sekiwake #1; 12–3; O	East Ōzeki #3; 10–5	East Ōzeki #2; 14–1
2003	East Ōzeki #1; 14–1	West Yokozuna #1; 10–5	East Yokozuna #1; 13–2	East Yokozuna #1; 5–5–5	East Yokozuna #1; 13–2	East Yokozuna #1; 12–3
2004	East Yokozuna #1; 15–0	East Yokozuna #1; 15–0	East Yokozuna #1; 13–2–P	East Yokozuna #1; 13–2	East Yokozuna #1; 9–6	East Yokozuna #1; 13–2
2005	East Yokozuna #1; 15–0	East Yokozuna #1; 14–1	East Yokozuna #1; 15–0	East Yokozuna #1; 13–2	East Yokozuna #1; 13–2–P	East Yokozuna #1; 14–1
2006	East Yokozuna #1; 11–4	East Yokozuna #1; 13–2–P	East Yokozuna #1; 1–2–12	East Yokozuna #1; 14–1	East Yokozuna #1; 13–2	East Yokozuna #1; 15–0
2007	East Yokozuna #1; 14–1	East Yokozuna #1; 13–2–P	East Yokozuna #1; 10–5	East Yokozuna #1; 14–1	East Yokozuna #1; Suspended; 0–0–15	West Yokozuna #1; Suspended; 0–0–15
2008	West Yokozuna #1; 13–2	West Yokozuna #1; 13–2	East Yokozuna #1; 11–4	East Yokozuna #1; 3–3–9	West Yokozuna #1; 5–5–5	West Yokozuna #1; Sat out due to injury 0–0–15
2009	West Yokozuna #1; 14–1–P	East Yokozuna #1; 11–4	West Yokozuna #1; 12–3	West Yokozuna #1; 10–5	West Yokozuna #1; 14–1–P	East Yokozuna #1; 11–4
2010	West Yokozuna #1; 13–2	Retired –	x	x	x	x
Record given as wins–losses–absences Top division champion Top division runner-up Retired Non-participation Jūryō Lower divisions Sanshō key: F=Fighting spirit; O=Outstanding performance; T=Technique Also shown: ★=Kinboshi; P=Playoff(s); Divisions: Makuuchi — Jūryō — Makushita — Sandanme — Jonidan — Jonokuchi Makuuchi ranks: Yokozuna — Ōzeki — Sekiwake — Komusubi — Maegashira

== See also ==
- Glossary of sumo terms
- List of past sumo wrestlers
- List of Mongolian sumo wrestlers
- List of non-Japanese sumo wrestlers
- List of sumo record holders
- List of sumo top division champions
- List of sumo top division runners-up
- List of yokozuna

Preceded by Musashimaru Kōyō	68th Yokozuna; 2003–2010	Succeeded by Hakuhō Shō
Yokozuna is not a successive rank, and more than one wrestler can hold the title at once
