= Hiro Morita =

Japanese announcer (born 1967)

Hiroshi Morita
- 森田 博士
- Born: 7 August 1967 (age 58); Tokyo, Japan
- Other names: Hiro Morita
- Education: Ohio State University
- Occupations: news anchor; television presenter; journalist; YouTuber
- Years active: 1994–present
- Employer(s): NHK; Japan Sumo Association
- Television: NHK Newsline; Grand Sumo; Dosukoi Sumo Salon; Sumo Prime Time

Hiroshi Morita (森田 博士, Morita Hiroshi; born 7 August 1967), known professionally as Hiro Morita, is a Japanese English-language announcer for NHK and a presenter on Japan Sumo Association's English-language YouTube channel, Sumo Prime Time.

Born in Tokyo, Morita moved to Columbus, Ohio when he was a teenager. He graduated Ohio State University and was later hired by NHK as a producer, but later became an English-language announcer. His career in the broadcast industry began when he asked NHK producer Shigeno Tateno to give him a job, despite not having previous experience.

== NHK newsline ==
Morita joined NHK in 1994 and was for a time an announcer on NHK World-Japan's international news program NHK Newsline.

== Sumo ==
=== Commentary ===
Morita is also known for hosting programs related to professional sumo on NHK World-Japan. He has been a play-by-play announcer since 1999, and since 2016 he has covered sumo tournament news, including host of the program Grand Sumo Preview and color commentator on Grand Sumo Highlights. He is one of a roster of English-language play-by-play announcers for sumo tournaments that air live on NHK.

=== International promotion of sumo ===
Morita traveled in 2019 to Georgia, Estonia, and Lithuania to promote sumo in those countries. In each of those countries, he lectured on sumo and its history, and presented exhibits with various artifacts related to the sport. During the trip, he also met with former ōzeki Baruto Kaito in Estonia, who demonstrated basic sumo techniques to the audience.

In August 2022, the Japan Sumo Association launched an English-language YouTube channel called Sumo Prime Time in hopes of drawing a larger international audience to sumo. Launched at the initiative of Morita, the channel provides basic sumo explanations such as rikishi routine or training and kimarite moves. It also provides exclusive interviews of toshiyori and rikishi, generally the winner of the previous tournament and popular figures of the sport.

He is credited with playing a major role in the success of the Japan Sumo Association's London tour from October 15 to 19, 2025, the first international outing for professional sumo in 30 years. More specifically, his video productions and explanations for the general public broadcast live on the BBC were as much appreciated as his guidance and advice to the tour organizers.
