= Rice wine cup =

Drinking vessel

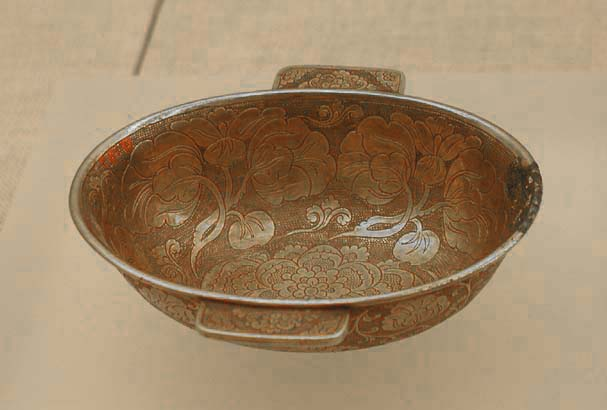
An "eared" metal rice wine cup (羽觞) from the Tang dynasty period, China

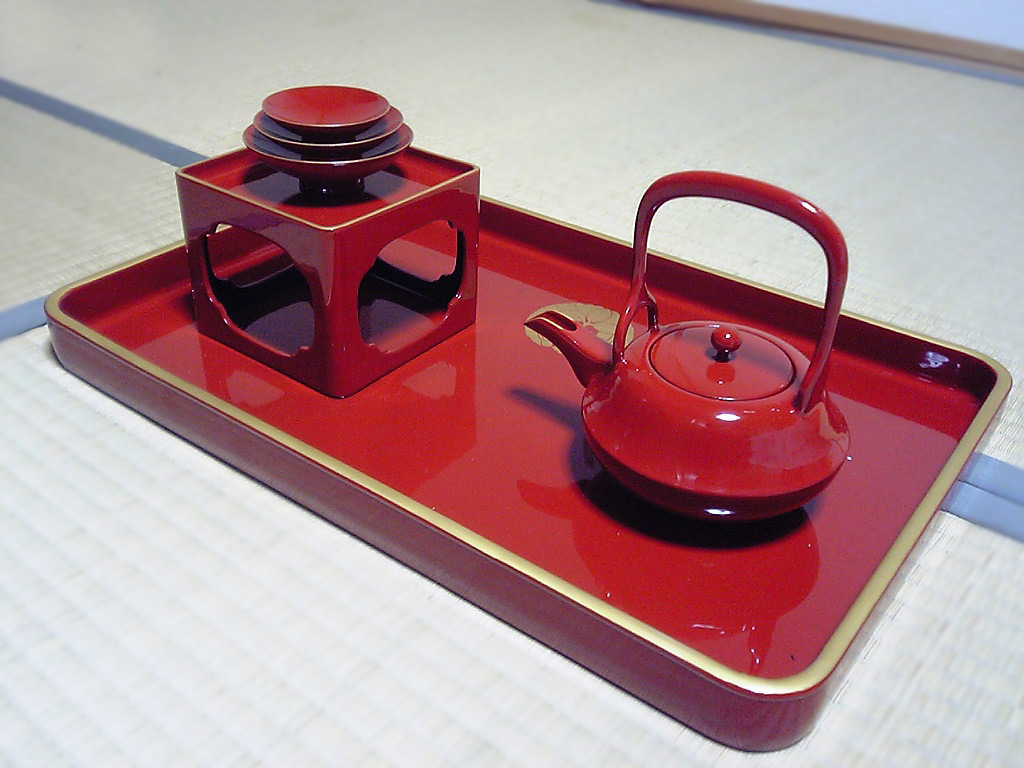
Cups used for drinking a special rice wine, called Toso in Japan

A rice wine cup is a vessel for drinking rice wine. In China, Japan and Korea, the traditional rice wine cups are usually round and shallow, in contrast to the deeper wine glasses of Western culture.

Rice wine cups can be made of stone, porcelain, metal or wood. Wooden cups often use lacquerware, and can be floated in water during winding stream parties. Different rice wines have different vessels with their own names and uses.

== History ==
=== Shinto ===
In Japanese shrines and the imperial family, sake cups are sometimes used to serve sake for offerings to the gods (Omiki). Sake cups are also used in formal occasions, such as Shinto weddings and Shinto rituals. It is also sometimes given as a prize when winning a championship.

== Types ==
=== Japanese ===
==== Sakazuki ====
The oldest sake cup. Mainly favored during ceremonies, such as weddings, Sakazuki is usually made of porcelain, earthenware, or lacquer, beautifully decorated, and typically only holds a few sips. The formal way to sip using a Sakazuki is by lifting it to the mouth with two hands, one holding the bottom of the cup, and the other hand holding it on the side.

==== Guinomi ====
A deeper round cup than the Sakazuki, usually made from porcelain and earthenware, and now available in glass. Typically used to enjoy chilled sake in summer. When first popularized during the Edo Period (1603–1868), the Guinomi held more sake than the Sakazuki and was appreciated as a less formal way to enjoy sake than the Sakazuki.

==== Ochoko ====
Generally smaller than Guinomi and in a thimble-like shape. The traditional etiquette for the Ochoko and the Sakazuki is to pour for others and to accept offers of sake in return, but today, it is also acceptable to pour for oneself at an informal event. Sake producers also use a “Janome Choko” or “Kikichoko”, a larger Ochoko with a concentric blue and white pattern on the inside of the cup to examine the sake's color and clearness.

==== Masu ====
A square box vessel. Originated as a tool for measurement rather than a drinking cup, the Masu was used by merchants in the Edo Period to measure products such as rice, soy sauce, and sake. Now a popular cup at festivals, cherry blossom viewing, and other events.

=== Korean ===
==== Makgeolli cups ====
The traditional method of serving Makgeolli is to ladle it out of a clay crock or to pour it from a brass kettle into shallow bowls. Now, there are no strict rules on what Makgeolli cups should look like, and many modern designs and materials have used, but it is found that the most preferred amount a Makgeolli cup should hold is 150 ~ 200 ml and have a wide and shallow bowl-like shape.

=== Chinese ===
==== Baijiu cups ====
Rice Wine Baijiu, the lightest form of Baijiu and comparable to Japanese sake, is traditionally served in small shot glasses.

==== Feather Cup/Ear Cup ====
Ancient Chinese wine vessel (羽觞) that has ears on each side, like the wings of a bird. Appeared in the Warring States Period and continued to be used until the Wei and Jin Dynasties, leading up to its gradual disappearance. A large number of these vessels have been discovered in archaeological excavations across China.

== See also ==
- Wine accessory
