= Honbasho =

Official sumo tournament

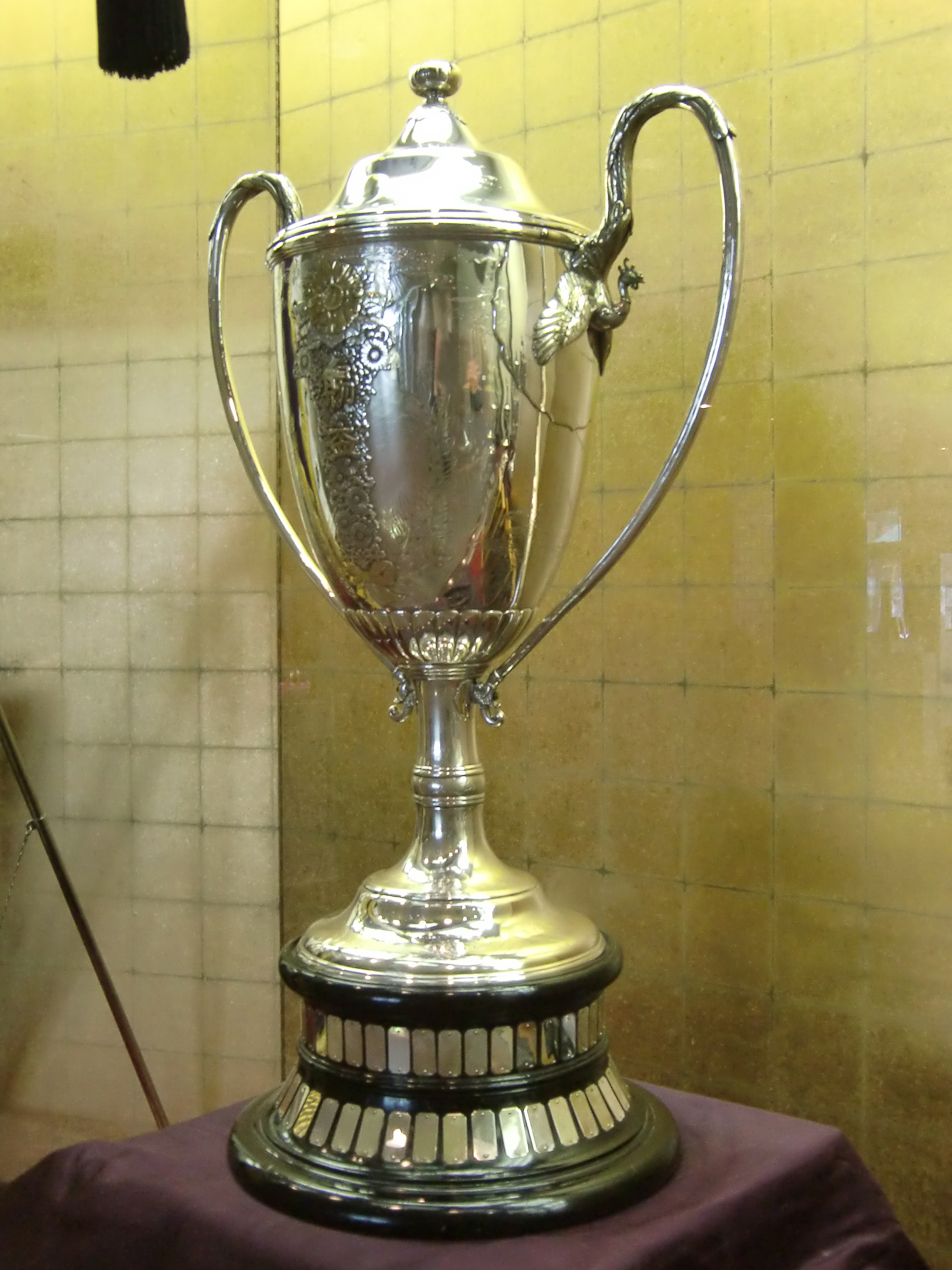
- Emperor's Cup

Tournament information
- Sport: Sumo
- Location: Japan
- Established: 1926
- Administrator: Japan Sumo Association

Current champion
- Ōnosato

A honbasho (Japanese: 本場所), or Grand Sumo Tournament in English, is an official professional sumo tournament. Only honbasho results matter in determining promotion and relegation for rikishi (sumo wrestlers) on the banzuke ranking. Before the 19th century, a wrestler's record at a tournament was of little consequence and the number of honbasho held every year varied, as did their length. Honbasho have been organized by the Japan Sumo Association since 1926, following the merger of the Tokyo and Osaka sumo associations. Since 1958, there are six tournaments held over 15 consecutive days in four locations every year. They are held every other month, with the first in January.

== Etymology ==
The term honbasho means "main (or real) tournament" and is used to distinguish these tournaments from unofficial tournaments which are held as part of sumo tours, between the six major tournaments. Such display tournaments may have prize money attached but a wrestler's performance has no effect on his ranking. This type of sumo is often called hana-sumo (lit. flower-sumo) as it is not taken as seriously by the wrestlers.

== History ==
In the Edo period, the locations of sumo tournaments and the rikishi (sumo wrestlers) who competed in them varied. Sumo was particularly popular in the cities of Edo, Kyoto, and Osaka; with tournaments held twice a year in Edo, and once a year in both Kyoto and Osaka. The tournaments lasted 10 days each.

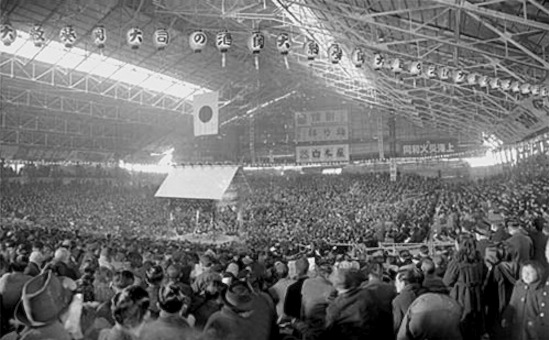
Inside of the Kuramae Kokugikan during the January 1950 honbasho

In 1926, the newly formed Japan Sumo Association increased the number of honbasho held each year from two to four. In 1928, they introduced rules such as marking uncontested bouts as forfeitures (fusenshō) to help guarantee tournaments end with a clear winner. A playoff structure was implemented in 1947 to decide a champion in the case of tied records. In 1949, the length of the tournaments was extended from 10 days to 15. In 1958, the number of honbasho held each year increased again, this time to six.

Before the 19th century, a wrestler's record at a tournament was of little consequence, and promotion through the banzuke ranks was more closely tied to popularity. In 1884, the Yomiuri Shimbun began publishing rudimentary summaries of honbasho results in their newspaper. The newspaper Jiji Shinpō began offering the first award for performances in 1889, giving it to any wrestler who finished a tournament undefeated. Other newspapers quickly followed with their own awards. However, these prizes went unclaimed if no rikishi finished undefeated. Wanting a way to decide a definite winner each tournament, by 1900 daily newspapers such as the Osaka Mainichi Shimbun had begun bestowing awards on the wrestler with the best record of a honbasho. The term yūshō emerged to indicate a wrestler who had finished with a perfect record, but has since come to denote the tournament champion regardless of his record. Each division has a championship prize for the wrestler with the most wins. The winner of the top makuuchi division's honbasho receives a plethora of trophies and prizes from various organizations, regions and countries, but most notable is the 30kg sterling silver Emperor's Cup. Since 1947, three special prizes called sanshō may be awarded to wrestlers in the makuuchi division for exceptional performances during a honbasho.

== Format ==
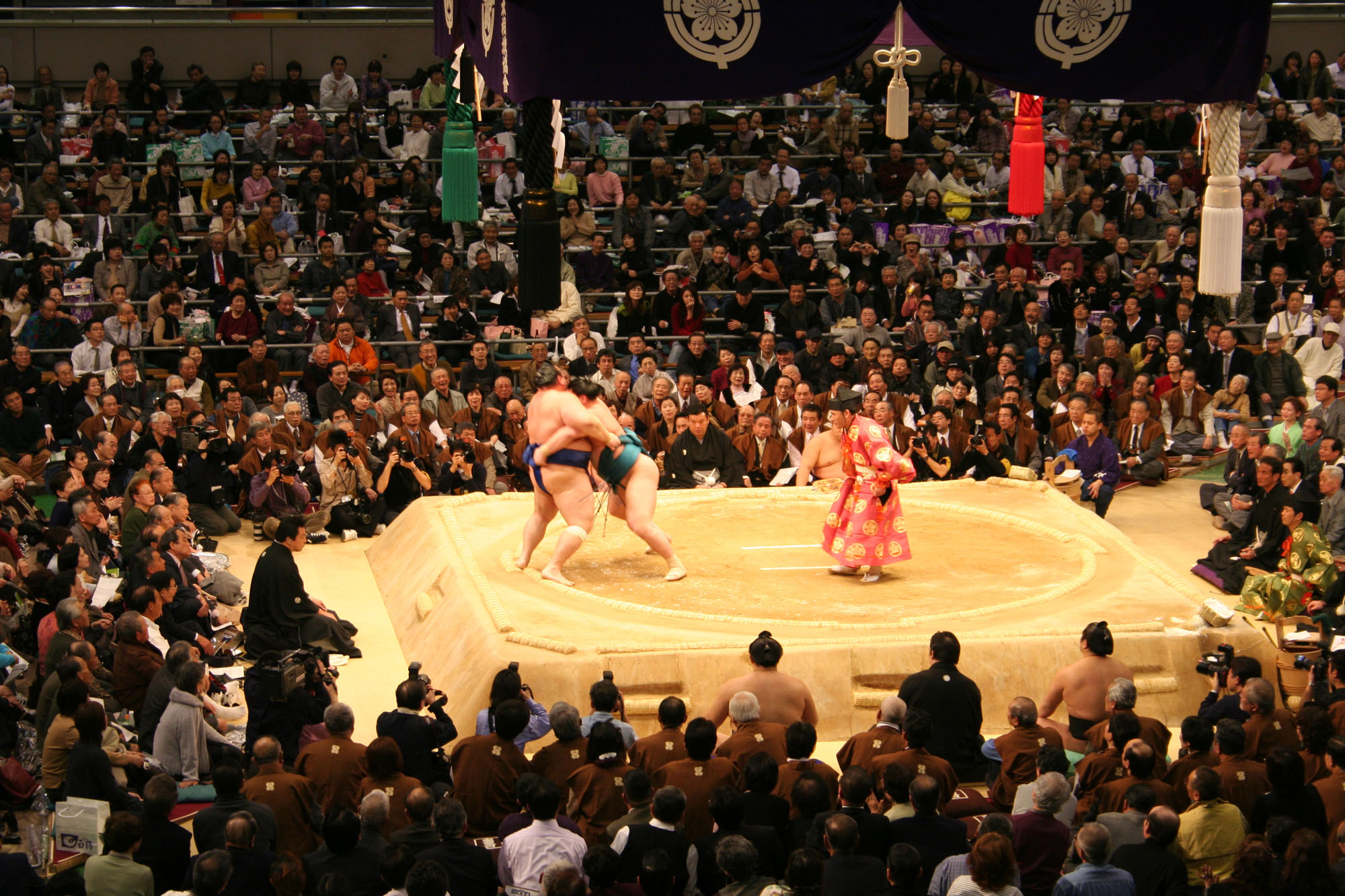
A match at the Osaka Prefectural Gymnasium during the March 2006 honbasho

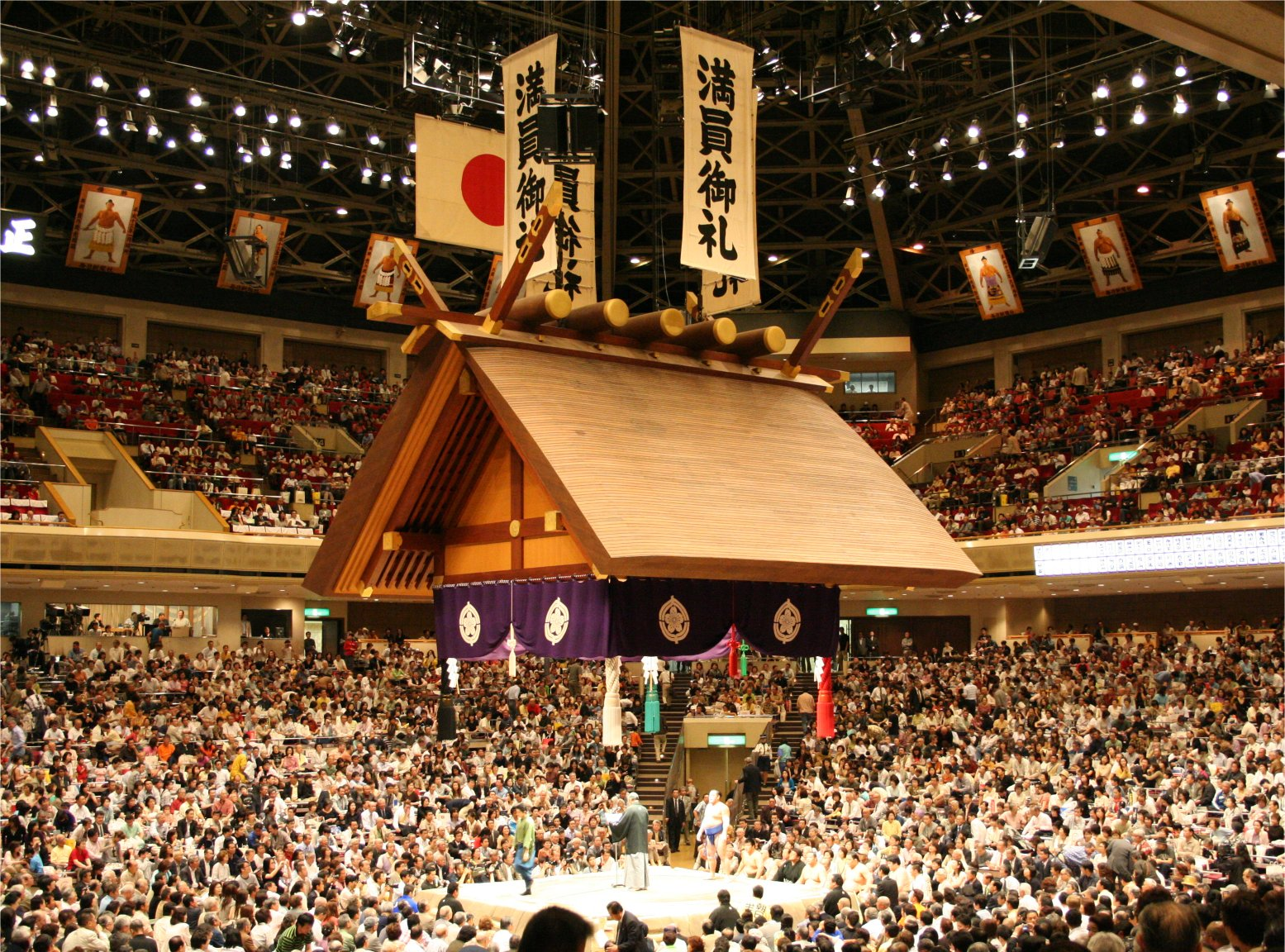
Inside of the Ryōgoku Kokugikan during the May 2006 honbasho

With honbasho lasting 15 days, sumo wrestlers ranked in the top two divisions (makuuchi and jūryō) wrestle once a day, while those of the lower divisions wrestle seven times total, approximately once every alternate day. The lower division matches begin at 8:30am. As honbasho results determine promotion and relegation on the banzuke, the first aim for most wrestlers is to achieve kachi-koshi, or a majority of wins, and thus ensure a promotion for the next tournament. A playoff on the final day is used to decide the winner in case of a tie.

Unless a playoff is required, two wrestlers will fight each other no more than once in a whole tournament. The bout schedule is set by a committee of toshiyori a day or two in advance of a tournament day and may be announced from the dohyō the day prior by a senior gyōji. Although there is no fixed method, for the first half of a tournament the top makuuchi division will generally see its higher-ranked wrestlers (san'yaku) paired against its lower-ranked wrestlers (maegashira), with the rest of the maegashira fighting among ranks closer in strength. The schedule for the second half of the tournament will have mainly san'yaku fighting each other, with the remainder of the ranks determined by their win–loss records up to that point. One consideration is to minimize the necessity for a tie-breaking bout, particularly if a contender for the championship is lower-ranked and has thus far faced only other lower-ranked wrestlers. In the last day, wrestlers with 7-7 records are scheduled to face each other if possible, to avoid any possibility of match-fixing where wrestlers will allow another wrestler on the border of a winning and losing record to win and achieve a kachi-koshi; wrestlers with top records will also face each other to increase the possibility of a decisive bout.

Matchmaking in the second-highest jūryō division works somewhat similarly to the top division, although there are no san'yaku. In the third-highest makushita division and below, wrestlers are matched against those with the same record almost without exception, with ranks kept as close as possible. Outside playoff bouts, neither wrestlers from the same heya (stable) nor wrestlers related by blood are scheduled to fight each other in any division.

If a wrestler has withdrawn due to injury or retirement from a scheduled bout, his opponent wins by default (fusenshō). A loss by default is known as fusenpai. Any remaining bouts that a wrestler misses will be regarded as losses when drawing up the next tournament's rankings. If a withdrawal results in an odd number of wrestlers in one division, the schedule is filled in by pairing a lower-ranked wrestler against a higher-ranked wrestler from the next-lowest division.

== Schedule ==
Honbasho	Nickname(s)	City	Venue	Opening day
January	Hatsu Basho (初場所; "Opening Tournament")	Tokyo	Ryōgoku Kokugikan	1st or 2nd Sunday
March	Haru Basho (春場所; "Spring Tournament"), Osaka Basho (大阪場所)	Osaka	Osaka Prefectural Gymnasium	2nd Sunday
May	Natsu Basho (夏場所; "Summer Tournament")	Tokyo	Ryōgoku Kokugikan	2nd Sunday
July	Nagoya Basho ("Nagoya Tournament") (名古屋場所)	Nagoya	Aichi International Arena	1st or 2nd Sunday
September	Aki Basho (秋場所; "Autumn/Fall Tournament")	Tokyo	Ryōgoku Kokugikan	2nd Sunday
November	Kyūshū Basho ("Kyūshū Tournament") (九州場所)	Fukuoka	Fukuoka Kokusai Center	2nd Sunday

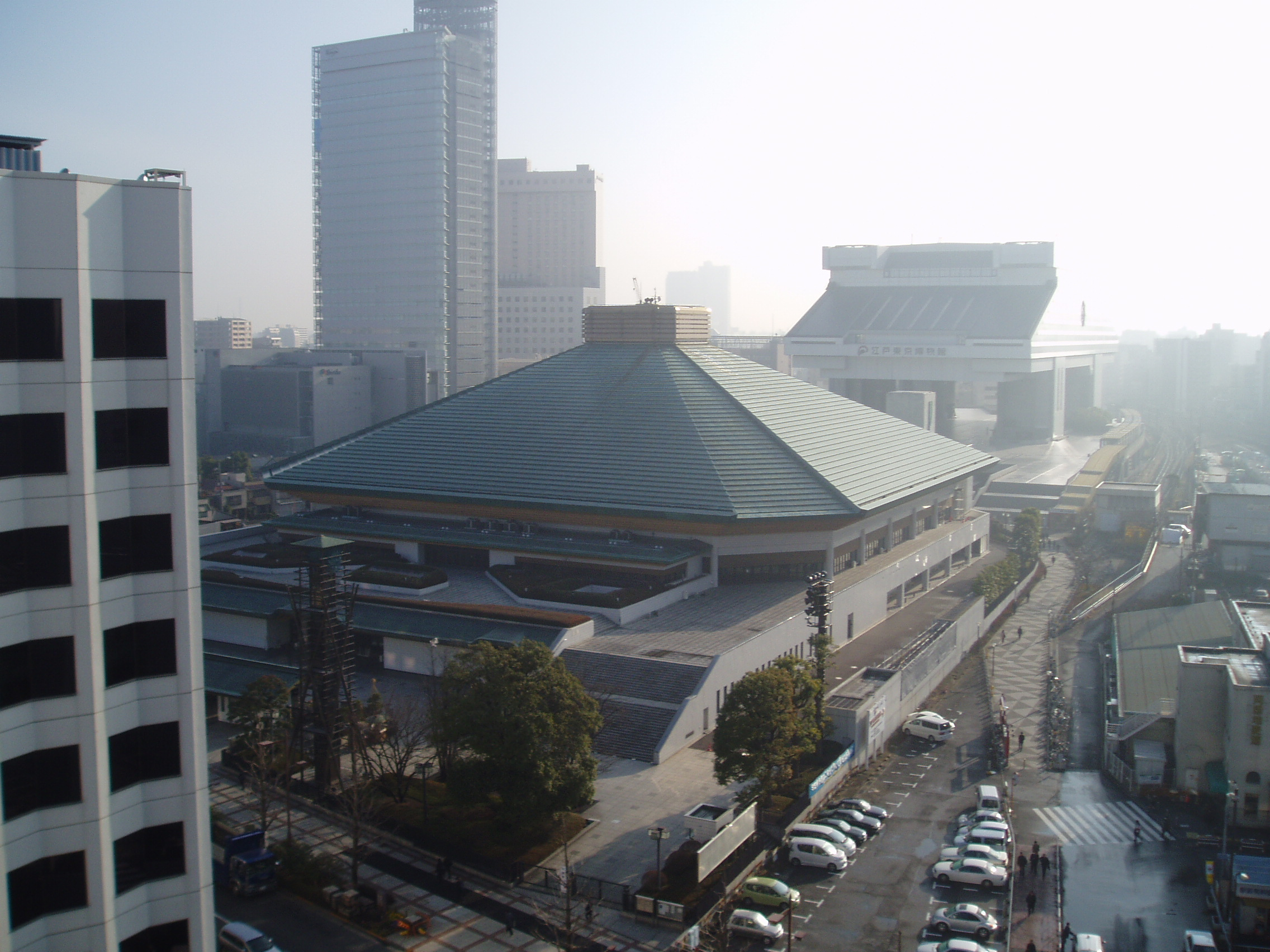
Ryōgoku Kokugikan

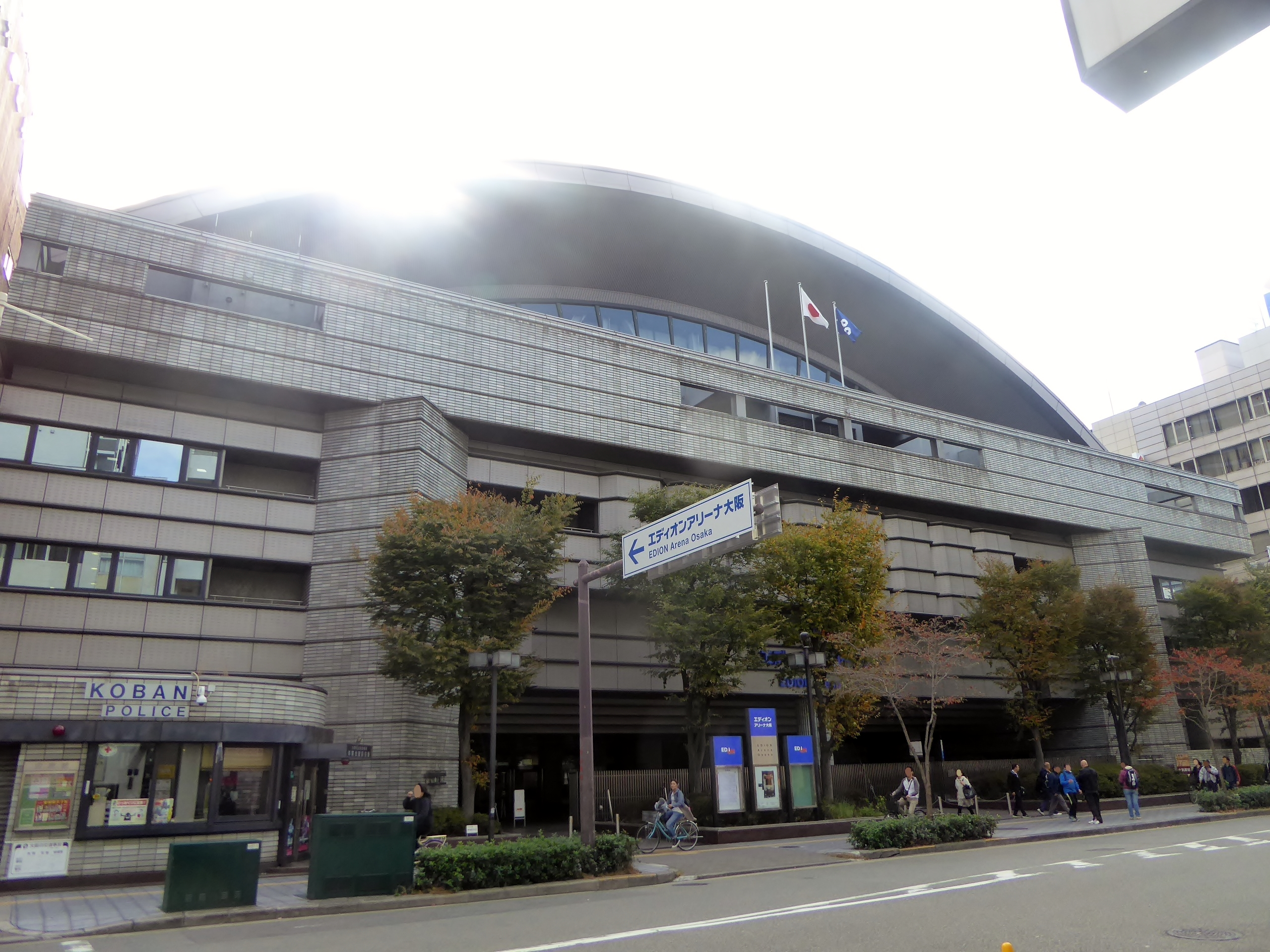
Osaka Prefectural Gymnasium
(Edion Arena Osaka)

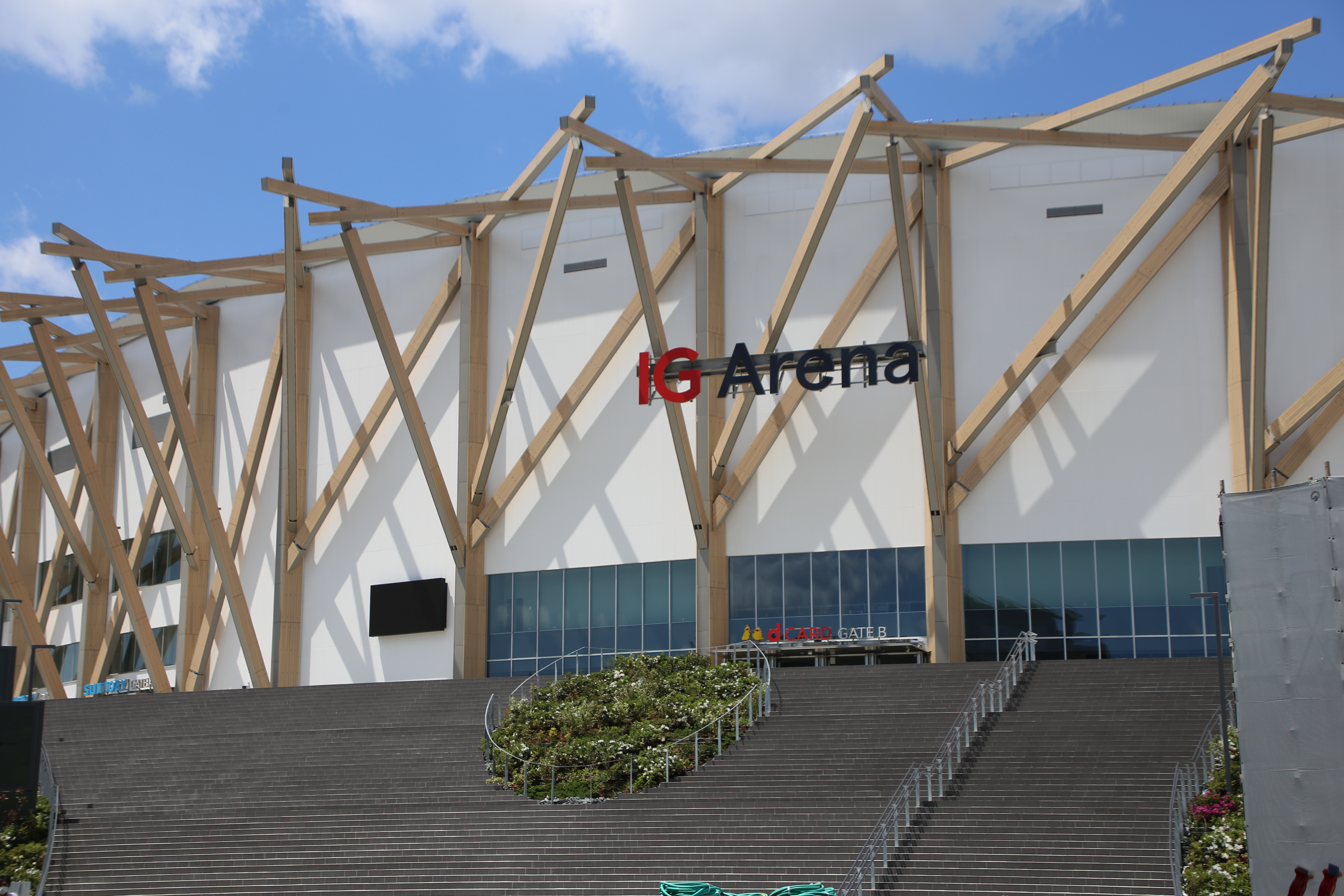
Aichi International Arena
(IG Arena)

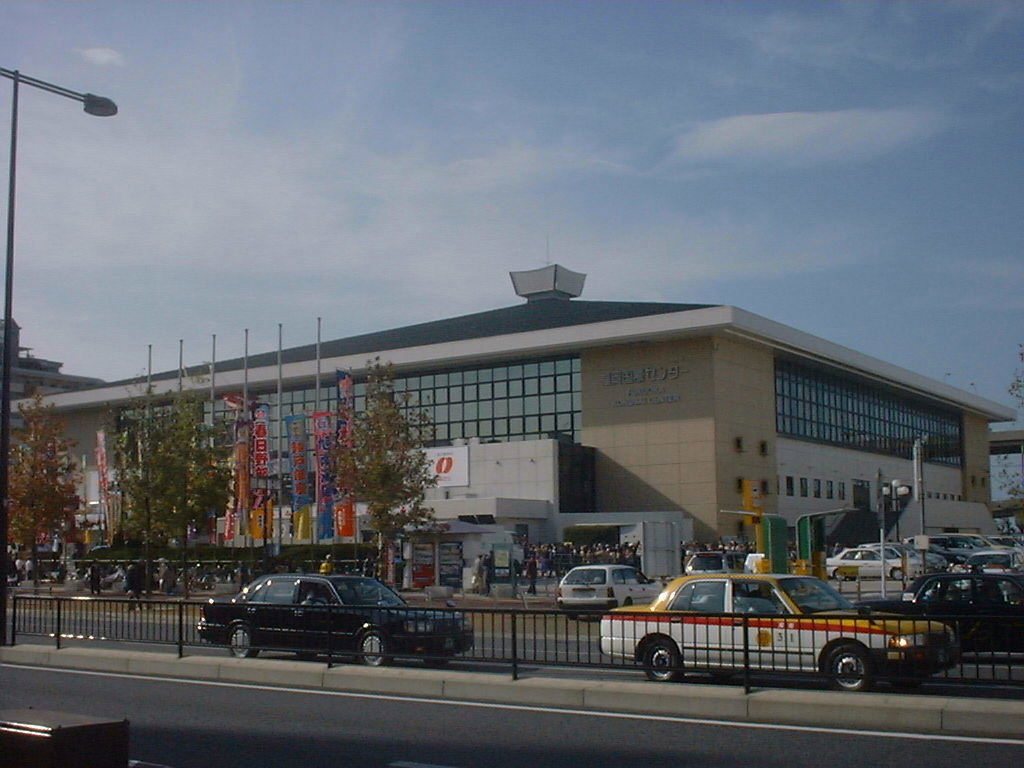
Fukuoka Kokusai Center

The Ryōgoku Kokugikan is owned by the Japan Sumo Association and is therefore the only venue set up for sumo all year round. Preparing the other venues for their respective honbasho begins a week in advance. 2020's July and November tournaments and the March 2021 tournament were all held at the Ryōgoku Kokugikan in Tokyo to avoid unnecessary travel during the COVID-19 pandemic in Japan.

=== Former venues ===
The current Ryōgoku Kokugikan was opened in 1985. Prior to that an arena of the same name hosted honbasho in Tokyo from 1909 to 1946. From the 1950s through 1984, Tokyo tournaments were held at the Kuramae Kokugikan.

From 1958 to 1964, the July honbasho was held at Kanayama Gymnasium. As a converted aircraft hangar, the inside became very hot, so pillars of ice would be placed in the aisles. This earned the honbasho the nickname the "Tropical Tournament" (熱帯場所). The following year the Nagoya tournament switched to Aichi Prefectural Gymnasium, where it stayed until 2024.

== Cancelled tournaments ==
The March 2011 tournament was cancelled due to the Japan Sumo Association launching an investigation into allegations of match-fixing involving several sekitori-ranked wrestlers. This was the first cancellation of a honbasho since 1946, when the May tournament was not held because of renovations to the Ryōgoku Kokugikan following damage sustained in World War II. The May 2011 tournament went ahead but was described by the Sumo Association as a "Technical Examination Tournament" rather than a full-fledged honbasho, with free admission and no prize money or trophies awarded.

The March 2020 tournament was conducted without spectators due to the recent COVID-19 pandemic in Japan and surrounding areas. It was the first time since World War II that a basho had been closed to the general public. The move followed a request from the Japanese Government that major public events be cancelled, postponed or scaled down in order to control the spread of the virus. The Sumo Association added that if any of the wrestlers during the tournament were found to be infected with COVID-19, the rest of the tournament would have been cancelled. The May tournament that year was cancelled as the pandemic continued in Japan.

== See also ==
- List of sumo tournament top division champions
- List of sumo tournament second division champions
- List of sumo record holders
- List of sumo trophies
