= Japan Sumo Association =

Wrestling regulatory agency

Japan Sumo Association 日本相撲協会
- Nihon Sumō Kyōkai
- Predecessor: Edo-sumo Kaisho
- Formation: December 28, 1925; 100 years ago
- Merger of: Tokyo Sumo Association, Osaka Sumo Association
- Type: Nonprofit
- Legal status: Public Interest Incorporated Foundation
- Purpose: Organization of sumo tournaments and promotion of sumo culture. Maintenance and operation of sumo training schools, Ryōgoku Kokugikan and Sumo Museum.
- Headquarters: Ryōgoku Kokugikan
- Location: Tokyo, Japan
- Coordinates: 35.69694°N 139.79338°E
- Region served: Japan
- Members: c. 1,000
- Official language: Japanese
- Chairman: Hakkaku Nobuyoshi
- Board of directors: See below
- Key people: Dewanoumi Akikazu (current Operations director); Asakayama Hiroyuki (current Judging department chairman); Tadamori Ōshima (current Chairman of the Yokozuna Deliberation Council)
- Parent organization: Ministry of Education, Culture, Sports, Science and Technology
- Subsidiaries: Kokugikan Service Company, Sumo Museum
- Secessions: Takasago Kaisei-Gumi (1873–1878); All Japan Kansai Sumo Association (1932–1937)
- Affiliations: Yokozuna Deliberation Council (advisory body)
- Revenue: ¥13 billion (2023)
- Website: https://www.sumo.or.jp/En/
- Formerly called: All Japan Sumo Association (大日本相撲協会)

The Japan Sumo Association (Japanese: 日本相撲協会, Hepburn: Nihon Sumō Kyōkai), officially the Public Interest Incorporated Foundation Japan Sumo Association (公益財団法人日本相撲協会, Kōeki zaidanhōjin Nihon Sumō Kyōkai); sometimes abbreviated JSA or NSK, and more usually called Sumo Kyōkai, is the governing body that operates and controls professional sumo wrestling, called ōzumō (大相撲), in Japan under the jurisdiction of the Japanese Ministry of Education, Culture, Sports, Science and Technology (MEXT).

Concretely, the association maintains and develops sumo traditions and integrity by holding tournaments and tours. The purposes of the association are also to develop the means dedicated to the sport and maintain, manage and operate the facilities necessary for these activities. Therefore, the JSA operates subsidiaries such as the Kokugikan Service Company to organize its economic aspects, the Sumo School to organize training and instruction or the Sumo Museum to preserve and utilize sumo wrestling records and artefacts.

Though professionals, such as active wrestlers, referees, hairdressers and ushers, are all on the association's payroll, leadership positions are restricted to retired wrestlers. The organization has its headquarters in the Ryōgoku Kokugikan arena, in Sumida, Tokyo.

The association's culture is based on respect for the law and continuity of sumo's traditions, deeply rooted in Japan's history and Shinto religion. It has a reputation for secrecy. In response to a number of scandals, the association has implemented numerous reforms in recent decades.

== History ==
=== Beginnings of organizations ===
The association has its origins in a Shinto ritual (or festival) that has been held since ancient times to pray for a bountiful harvest. This primary form of sumo was called shinji-zumō (神事相撲). During the Sengoku period, Oda Nobunaga made sumo a popular sport, aided by the emergence of large cities (like Edo, Osaka, Sendai and Nagoya), which soon began to compete with Kyoto's cultural monopoly, as it was Japan's only metropolis at the time. These new cultural centres saw the emergence of wrestling groups, from both the commoners and the warrior classes, who took part in festivities at shrines. During the Edo period, sumo bouts, called kanjin-sumo (勧進相撲), were often held to raise funds to develop provinces (new construction or repair of bridges, temples, shrines and other public buildings) or for entertainment purposes.

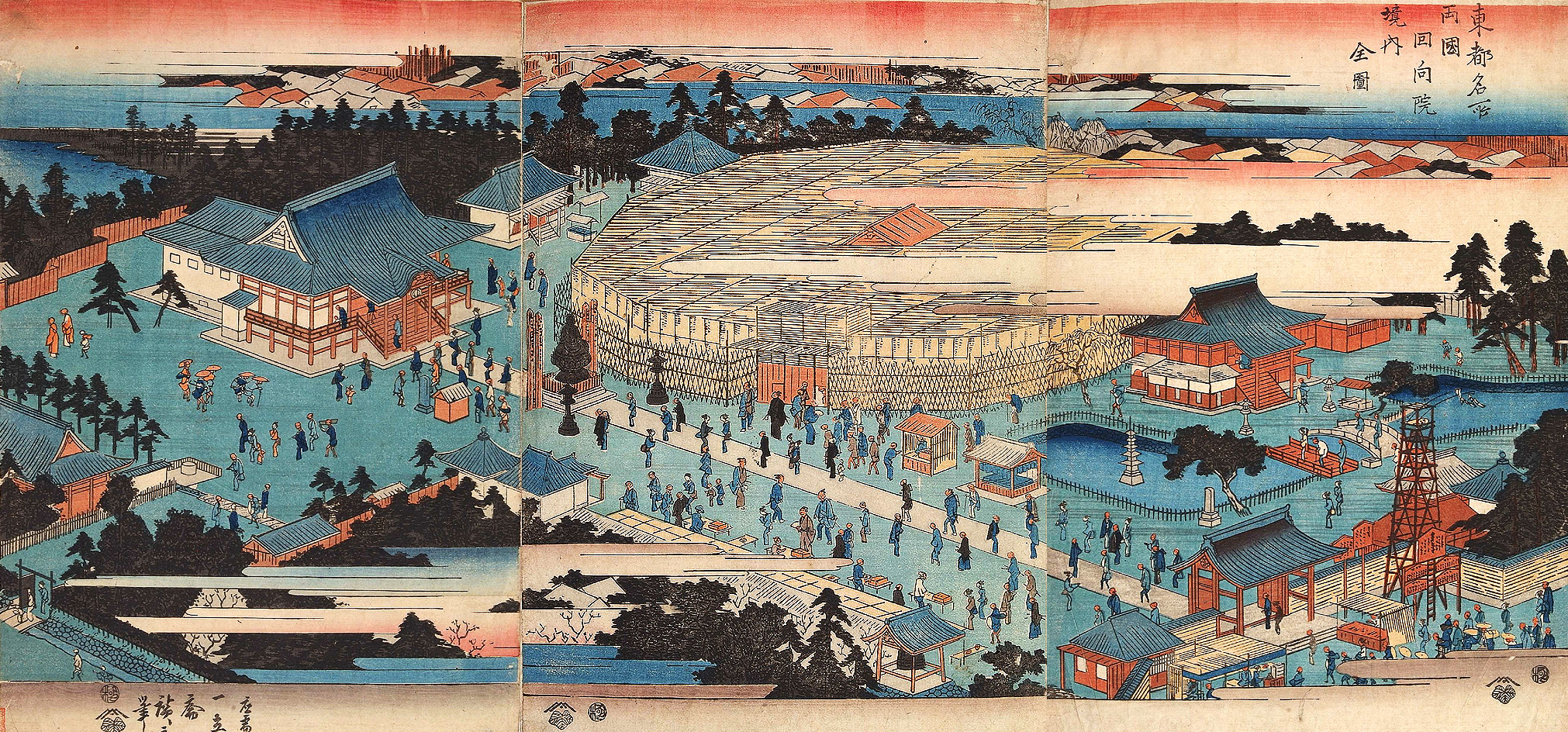
The premises of the Ekō-in temple in Edo, during a kanjin-sumo tournament (1842)

After the Sengoku period, during the period of peace established under the Tokugawa shogunate, Japan experienced an unprecedented period of vagrancy for many samurai who had lost their social standing (called rōnin). These masterless samurai, began to be organized in two extremes that coexisted side by side. On the one hand, certain powerful clans formed suites of wrestlers organized into veritable royal households called geisha-gumi (芸者組; lit. 'geisha troupe'), and elevated them to the status of vassals. On the other hand, a number of rōnin had no choice but to put their martial skills to good use in street sumo tournaments, called tsuji zumō (辻相撲, tsuji-sumo; lit. 'street-corner wrestling'), for the entertainment of passers-by. Similarly, a number of street entertainment wrestling groups formed and began touring, sometimes with the support of shrines that occasionally recruited them as part of religious festivities and to help priests raising money for the construction of buildings. Eventually, this mix of professional wrestlers and disgraced rōnins, along with the commoners who took part in the contests of strength of the street tournaments, created conflicts over money. Tense brawls, even deaths, sometimes occurred. Public order became so disturbed that in 1648 the Edo authorities issued an edict banning street sumo and matches organized to raise funds during festivities. Over the next two decades or so, the wrestlers, now without any income, decided to petition the authorities to lift the bans, forming informal associations that resembled coalitions of interests to protect themselves from any violent repression of their movement. In 1684, these movements bore fruit and a rōnin by the name of Ikazuchi Gondaiyū (雷 権太夫) obtained permission to hold a tournament after proposing a new etiquette associated with tournaments. The organization of tournaments began to depend more on groups following new standards designed to satisfy the authorities of the towns hosting them. These associations gradually came to depend on the influence of retired former wrestlers who began to organize tournaments.

At that time, the Edo-based association (although composed of elders as today) was organized in such a way as to be dominated by a duo of executives, the fudegashira (筆頭), the director, and the fudewake (筆別), his second. The composition of the banzuke and its hierarchy was primarily their decision, and conflicts of interest were common. In addition, the profits from the tournaments were first divided among them before a portion was given to the other elders, who in turn distributed the money to their disciples. Because of the filtering of high-ranking managers, little money reached the bottom of the ladder, and this system was only tolerated because the patronage of local lords also added extra salaries for high-ranking wrestlers.

=== The foundations of the current association ===
Wrestlers who took part in these authorised tournaments without the patronage of lords did not yet have samurai status or a salary and their finances depended largely on donations they could receive from the organisers of charity tournaments or admirers. The organisers also ensured that they were fed and housed for the duration of the tournament. In those days the promotion system was decided by the tournament organisers, who then distributed the profits to the elders who then redistributed funds to their wrestlers, with the wrestlers under the protection of the lords receiving bonuses and having financial security and the others being kept in a situation of poverty. In 1757, during the Hōreki era, the beginnings of the Japan Sumo Associations were formally established as Edo Sumō kaisho (江戸相撲会所, Edo Sumo Club), later called Tokyo-zumō kaisho. In 1869, the Ōsaka Sumō Kyōkai (大坂相撲協会, Osaka Sumo Association) was founded. Each associations had their own history and changes. For example, from 1888 to 1895 the Kōkaku-gumi (廣角組), led by wrestlers Ōnaruto and Shingari, broke off from Osaka-sumo. In 1897, these movements led to reforms in the Osaka-based association, which became the Ōsaka Sumō Kyōkai (大阪角力協会, Osaka Wrestling Association). (Note: The spelling is pronounced "sumo" but the kanji used in the wording (角力) refer to an archaic spelling of the sport with a meaning closer to "having a trial of strength" or "wrestling".)

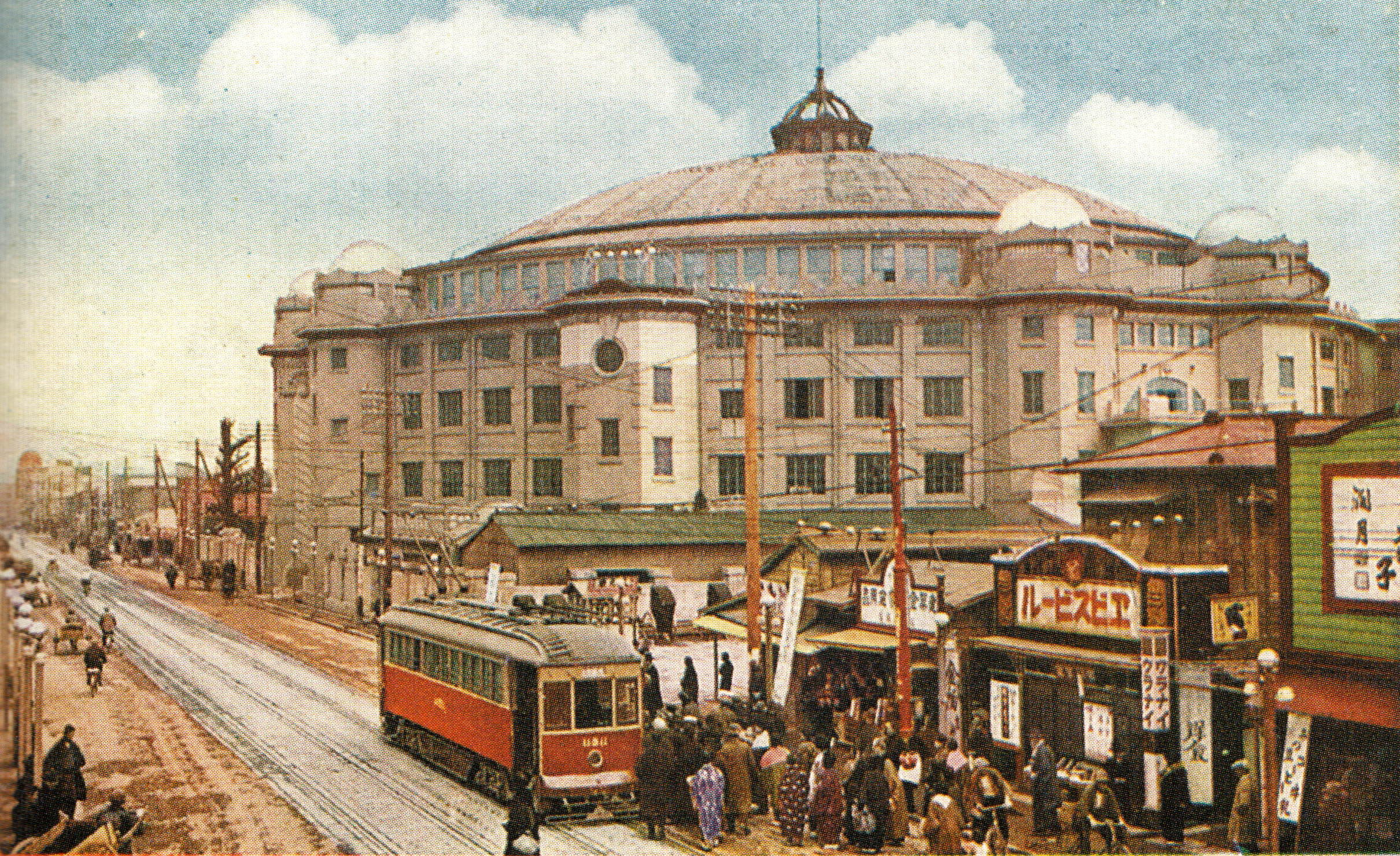
The first Ryōgoku Kokugikan in 1920.

From 1789, the Edo-based association began to incorporate religious practices into the sport, under the guidance of the House of Yoshida Tsukasa and the status of yokozuna was created in Edo. In the 1870s, the first wrestlers' revolt was organized by Takasago Uragorō asking for better treatment for the wrestlers (without initial success) and created a split from the Tokyo-based association before merging again. The Meiji Restoration was a period of semi-censorship of sumo, with the adoption of Western ideology leading to the perception of sumo as unworthy of the new era, as the matches were seen as barbaric and the semi-nudity of the wrestlers shocking. With the disappearance of government protection, the association found it difficult to keep up the number of wrestlers. At the same time, political circles were organized to preserve some of Japan's indigenous traditions, saving on behalf of the association the privilege of wrestlers to wear samurai chonmage (topknot) in 1871. The nobility introduced changes to the way tournaments were organised, reforming the way winnings were distributed and creating the status of association director. In an effort to change its image, the Tokyo-zumō kaisho changed its name to Tokyo Ōzumō Kyōkai (東京大相撲協会, Tokyo Grand Sumo Association) in 1889. The internal reforms carried out at the time included the election of directors, the creation of a fixed income for wrestlers and a change in refereeing decisions from gyōji to shimpan. During the same year, the Tokyo Ōzumō began to think about a project to install an arena at Hibiya Park to hold its bouts indoors, but the project was abandoned for lack of funds. In 1909, the association founded its first arena by inaugurating the first Ryōgoku Kokugikan, in order to avoid having to depend on the weather for tournaments held at the Ekō-in temple. Social movements in sumo did not cease, however, and in 1911 a strike called the Shinbashi Club Incident organized by low-ranking wrestlers asked for a new wage reform, securing a bonus (made up of payment in cash and a deposit in a pension fund) distributed to all wrestlers who were not ōzeki or yokozuna. In 1923, another strike known as the Mikawajima Incident demanded better pensions for wrestlers and was led by Yokozuna Ōnishiki, without success. In the same year, the first Kokugikan was ravaged by fire following the Great Kantō earthquake and most of the association's archives were lost.

Gradually, the Tokyo-based sumo association became dominant. In April 1925, Prince-Regent Hirohito invited the Tokyo Sumo Association to hold a tournament at the Imperial Palace, with the implied aim of also featuring wrestlers from the Osaka-based association. During the tournament, the Emperor's Cup (then the Prince-Regent's Cup) was awarded for the first time. Under the impetus of this tournament, a joint competition plan with a common banzuke was proposed, concluding talks that had been taking place since the early 1920s to merge the two rival associations. To establish a ranking according to the wrestlers' skills, qualifying tournaments were organized in November 1925 and in March and October 1926. The March 1926 tournament was officially recognised as the first modern honbasho (professional sumo championship tournament). During the same period, on 28 December 1925, the Tokyo Ōzumō Kyōkai became the Dai-Nihon Sumō Kyōkai (大日本相撲協会, All Japan Sumo Association), an organization now recognised as the first incarnation of today's association.

=== Merger and final recognition ===
As a result of the qualifying tournaments, the Osaka-based association lost many top-ranked wrestlers who found themselves demoted in the rankings, although Yokozuna Miyagiyama (the top ranked wrestler in Osaka) was able to retain his position. During tournaments, Osaka's wrestlers were regularly outclassed by their Tokyo counterparts, with some wrestlers ranked as ōzeki or yokozuna in Osaka even struggling against Tokyo's komusubi or sekiwake. Later in 1925, the first chairman of the association, Lieutenant-General Hirose Seitoku, was named.

In January 1927, the Osaka-based sumo association officially merged with the All Japan Sumo Association after a long decline. It saved face in the first tournament after the merger of the two associations, as the championship was won by Miyagiyama. The association formally acquired the status of nonprofit organization, and was placed under the supervision of the Ministry of Education, Science, Sports and Culture, since in Japan this type of organization requires registration with a government institution.

In 1932, the last major wrestlers' strike broke out with the Shunjuen Incident, calling for fundamental reform of the Sumo Association and leading to a mass resignation of wrestlers the likes of which professional sumo had never seen before. From 1933 to 1937, the All Japan Sumo Association briefly experienced a secession leading to the foundation of the Dai-Nihon Kansai Sumō Kyōkai (大日本関西角力協会, All Japan Kansai Sumo Association) by members of the Dewanoumi ichimon. The secessionist association later dissolved, but never had the association been so close to destruction.

In 1944, the first successor from the sumo world was chosen and Dewanoumi (the former Tsunenohana) became chairman of the association. After the war, the association was further modernized, in particular to maintain the sport in the context of the "budo ban" (a ban enforced on the practice of combat training disguised as martial arts gatherings by the authoritarian government) applied by the Allied forces. Thanks to the efforts of Musashigawa (the former Dewanohana) and Kasagiyama Katsuichi (a wrestler who spoke a little English), the association succeeded in convincing the Americans of the tournaments' good faith, and the first honbasho to be held after the war was in November 1945. Since the tournaments were later expropriated from the original Kokugikan for use by soldiers as "Memorial Hall", the association moved its headquarters to the Meiji Shrine in June 1947. In 1950, following a scandal involving the withdrawal from competition of the three yokozuna of the time (Azumafuji, Terukuni and Haguroyama) the association considered demoting the highest-ranking sumo wrestlers in the event of a poor score or consecutive absence from two tournaments, but decided to back down following pressure from traditionalists and purists. Common ground was found and the Yokozuna Deliberation Council was created, definitively detaching the association from the House of Yoshida, and declaring that the appointment of yokozuna would henceforth be based on recommendations from the board of directors and the new committee. In 1954, the association moved its headquarters to the Kuramae Kokugikan.

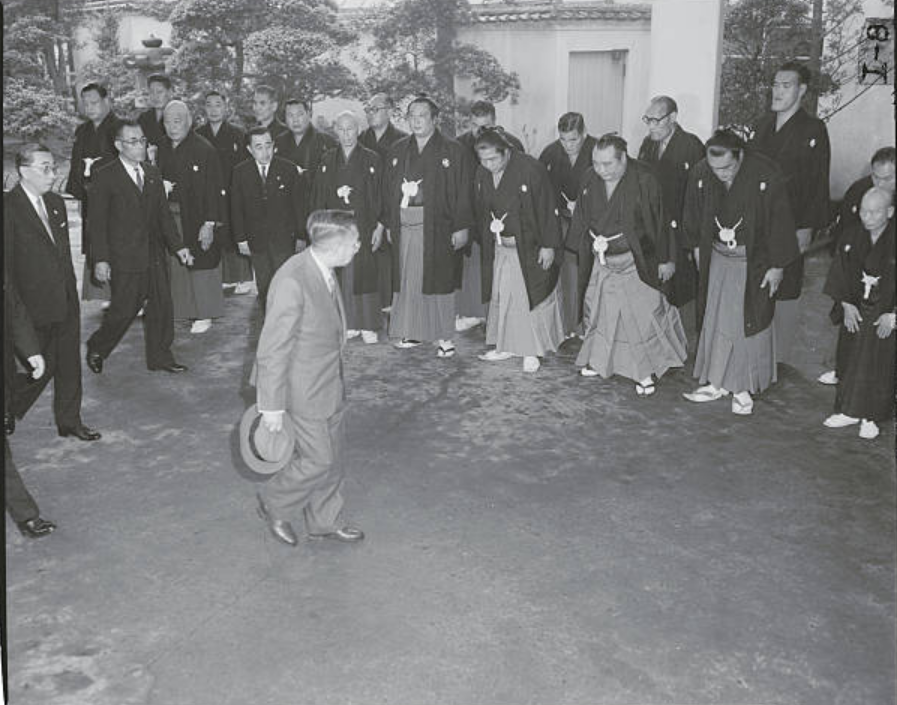
Emperor Shōwa is welcomed by JSA officials and top-ranked wrestlers during his visit of the Kuramae Kokugikan (1956).

The modernizations launched after the war were also notably introduced in response to a scandal highlighting the management of the association's missions and funds. In 1957, a special commission of the National Diet investigated the improper use of money by the association due to the general inability of the public to reserve seats for tournaments, in opposition to its non-profit status. In those days, the reservation system was mainly based on private teahouses, which gave patrons privileged access to tournaments. The scandal erupted when it was revealed that the wife and daughter of the then chairman, Dewanoumi, were running two of the biggest houses. The Diet also considered the association's missions, based on the testimonies of former Tenryū Saburō (former leader of the Shunjuen Incident) and Akutsugawa Kōichirō (former director of the association under the name Sadogatake). The association was further criticized for failing in its duties as a public interest corporation, notably on the subject of sumo teaching, by favoring the pursuit of profit. To sidestep the debate, the association founded the Sumo School to teach its recruits the basics of sumo. Since he was personally blamed for the management problems, Dewanoumi tried to commit suicide by seppuku. He was replaced by Tokitsukaze (former Futabayama) who began a series of reforms. Under his chairmanship, the teahouse system was reformed, with 40% of places now reserved for direct purchase, and the system placed under a commercial company directly dependent on the association. In 1958, the association took its definitive name by being renamed "Japan Sumo Association".

=== Modern times ===
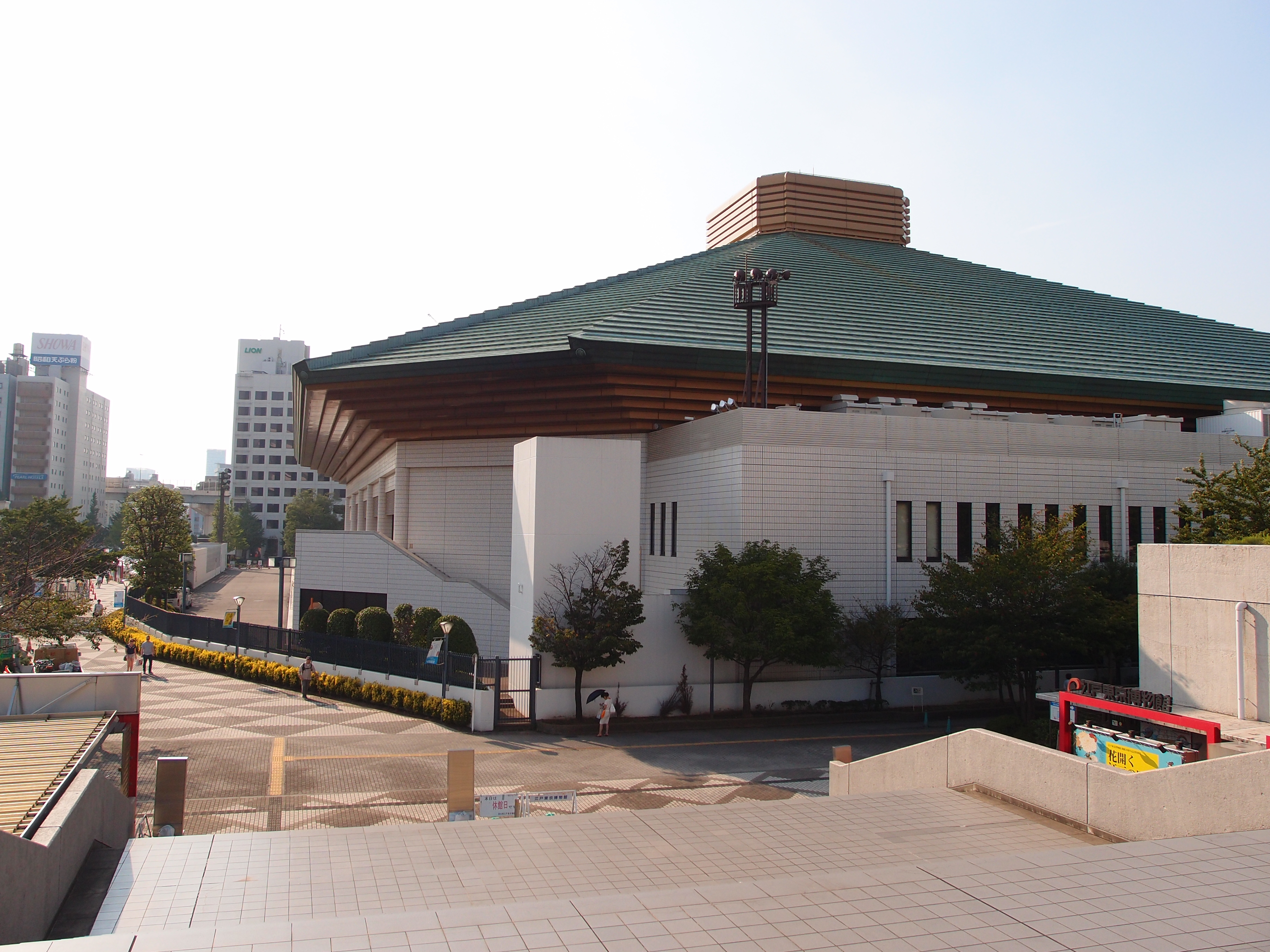
The second Ryōgoku Kokugikan in 2013.

In March 1968, the association's statutes were amended to restrict board membership to toshiyori, high-ranking wrestlers and gyōji. The number of directors was also limited to ten elders after negotiations between the five ichimon.

In the 1970's, the association opened up more officially to foreign wrestlers, which led to reflection on the possibility of these wrestlers remaining in the association after retirement. More specifically, the case of Hawaiian wrestler Takamiyama in 1976 provoked a conservative reaction from the association, which declared that sumo being Japan's national sport, it was inconceivable that a foreigner could participate as a trainer. The statement was subsequently severely criticized in the press. This led the association to correct its position in this regard, with the JSA subsequently declaring that Takamiyama and Kaneshiro (a Japanese sumo wrestler of Korean descent) would indeed be eligible to become coaches within the association after their retirements. Takamiyama was the first to retire, becoming a coach under the name Azumazeki, the first foreign-born sumo wrestler to do so.

In 1985, the association once again moved its headquarters and inaugurated the second Ryōgoku Kokugikan, acquiring the land by purchasing it from Japan National Railways.

In the early 1990s, an internal debate also shook the association over the fact that a foreign wrestler could become yokozuna. In 1992, a member of the Yokozuna Deliberation Council, Kojima Jo, was quoted in the magazine Bungei Shunjū as opposing the appointment of foreigners, who he felt were too far removed from the hinkaku (品格), the 'dignity', needed to become one of professional sumo's top ranked wrestler. However, other members of the council and the association maintained that they would consider a promotion if its conditions were met, regardless of who the wrestler was. Further controversy arose when The Nihon Keizai Shimbun reported that Konishiki, at the time the foreigner closest to promotion, had alleged racial discrimination was the reason for his being denied promotion. The New York Times subsequently quoted Konishiki as saying, "If I were Japanese, I would be yokozuna already". The association demanded an apology and Konishiki held a press conference during which he tearfully denied making the remarks. He insisted that The Nihon Keizai Shimbun had misinterpreted his remark, and that he had not spoken to The New York Times, and instead a Hawaiian apprentice Koryū had impersonated him on the telephone. In 1993, Akebono, a student of Azumazeki (former Takamiyama), became the first foreign-born yokozuna in the history of the sport.

=== Scandals prompting a reform era ===
Between 2007 and 2008, two scandals hit the association (the Tokitsukaze stable hazing scandal and the cannabis use scandal) leading to the resignation of chairman Kitanoumi in September 2008 and the appointment of Musashigawa (the former Mienoumi). In a move to increase transparency, the MEXT (under Vice-minister Kenshiro Matsunami) demanded the opening of the Sumo Association's board of directors to external auditors, introducing non-toshiyori personalities into the decision-making system for the first time in 63 years. At the time, the association's statutes clearly stated that only former wrestlers could sit on the board of directors but Vice-minister Matsunami insisted that the scandal was "the biggest disgrace in the history of sumo". Some internal voices argued that new blood was needed, opposing the appointment of then-chairman of the Yokozuna Deliberation Council, Ebisawa Katsuji. The new members of the Board were three auditors: Itō Shigeru (Professor Emeritus at the University of Tokyo), Murayama Hiroyoshi (lawyer and former Prosecutor General of the Tokyo Prosecutors' Office) and Jun Yoshino (former Police Commissioner). Although the internal organization was changed following the scandal, the external auditors are not given voting rights on the board and their position is only part-time.

During the 2010s, the association was also marked by the revelation of numerous scandals linked to its opaque organization. These scandals included wrestlers' links with organised crime and gambling, which is illegal in Japan. The violent nature of training and the legitimacy of violence within the traditional hierarchy of wrestlers was also called into question. Between 2010 and 2011, the association had to deal with the ties of several wrestlers in all divisions to organized crime. The scandal came to light in January when Ōzeki Kotomitsuki was reported in a Shūkan Shinchō article on 19 January as having participated in gambling circles run by yakuza. Although initially denied, the link between the yakuza and several members of the association was established over the course of the year. The scandal triggered a public outcry that flooded the association's switchboard with complaints and protests, and demonstrations were organized in front of the association's headquarters at the Ryōgoku Kokugikan. In order to satisfy requests for internal investigations and changes, the association dissolved its Life Guidance Committee, appointing a new committee made up of young elders between 30 and 45 years of age, headed by Michinoku (the former Kirishima). Chairman Musashigawa also resigned from his position in July, and was succeeded at the head of the association by Murayama Hiroyoshi, a lawyer who had previously been appointed auditor of the association in 2008, and who held the position of acting chairman until the beginning of August. At one point, the revelation of collusion between wrestlers and yakuza was such that MEXT threatened to dissolve the association's public non-profit institution act and confiscate the JSA's properties, including the Ryōgoku Kokugikan. In this context, Chief Cabinet Secretary Yukio Edano also declared that negotiations between the association and the ministry on acquiring Public Interest Incorporated Foundation status could fail, threatening the association with colossal financial losses, since other foundation statutes in Japan do not offer tax benefits. At the time, the association was involved in negotiations with the ministry to bring its statutes into line with the requirements of a law on public establishments passed in 2008, initially with the aim of achieving this status by the end of November 2013. The crisis, described as the most serious in sumo history, was such that several comments emerged on the fact that the damage could well threaten sumo's recognized position as Japan's national sport.

Chairman Musashigawa had to resign, and Hanaregoma (the former Kaiketsu) was appointed in his place with his presidency being tarnished by a match-fixing scandal that broke in February 2011. Under his impetus, the association initially reacted swiftly by cancelling the Haru basho in Osaka outright. However, the association's handling of the scandal soon came under criticism, particularly Hanaregoma's statement that there had never been match-fixing in sumo before. Despite the scandal, Hanaregoma succeeded in bringing negotiations on the status of the Public Interest Incorporated Foundation to a successful conclusion. Having reached the age limit of 65, Hanaregoma promptly resigned his post and Kitanoumi was elected for a second time to the head of the association, becoming the first chairman to return to this level of responsibility in the association's history. Despite the criticism, Hanaregoma's commitment during the crisis was hailed for running the association as a man of integrity, respected under the nickname "Clean Kaiketsu" (クリーン魁傑).

In January 2014, the association shifted to a Public Interest Incorporated Foundation and officially changed its name to Public Interest Incorporated Foundation Japan Sumo Association (公益財団法人日本相撲協会, Kōeki zaidanhōjin Nihon Sumō Kyōkai). The change, effectively implemented from March to coincide with new board of directors elections, had been delayed for a year following complicated negotiations over the status of toshiyori and the composition of the board. In order to bring the statutes of the association into line with the stipulations of the incorporated foundations was introduced the hyōgi-in (評議員, counselor committee), responsible for monitoring the shared interests of the ministry and the association. That council is made up equally of three retired oyakata (elders with no san'yo re-employment) elected within the association and four personalities appointed by the ministry. Their rank equals that of a director to the association's board. Elders on the committee are not allowed to concurrently serve as oyakata because of the committee authority that allows them to have a say in the appointment and dismissal of directors. Each counselor serves a term of four years. Also incorporated were bans on the purchase of toshiyori names and the widespread expulsion of employees who failed to comply with the association's rules.

In November 2015, the chairman of the association, Kitanoumi, died and an official funeral was held at the Ryōgoku Kokugikan by the JSA in December under the chairmanship of Hakkaku (former Hokutoumi), with around 2,500 people attending. During the same month, the board of directors appointed Hakkaku as chairman of the association, a position he had already held on an interim basis since Kitanoumi's death. Kitanoumi's sudden death launched an election in March 2016, described as "fierce" by the press. After negotiations for the positions of director and chairman, Hakkaku was elected head of the association, ahead of his main rival Takanohana.

In November 2017, the issue of violence scandals resurfaced within the association with Sports Nippon's revelations about Maegashira Takanoiwa's assault by Yokozuna Harumafuji. The incident generated intense media coverage, prompted by the previous scandals and the change in the association's nature to an incorporated non-profit foundation. The association's reaction was also heavily criticized, with some newspapers condemning a discourse that made excuses for the aggressor. In April 2018, the association's conduct was also criticized after women tried to come to the assistance of the mayor of Maizuru (Ryoto Tatami), who had collapsed in the ring. Since women are considered impure and are not allowed enter the ring, a gyōji (referee) ordered them to leave it despite the medical emergency. The incident triggered criticism from the public and from the Minister in charge of Women's Empowerment, Seiko Noda, forcing the association to publicly apologize.

=== 2020s ===
The COVID-19 pandemic in Japan forced the March 2020 tournament in Osaka to be held behind closed doors. The last time this occurred was in the June 1945 tournament, when only injured Pacific War veterans were invited to attend. This was followed by the cancellation of the May tournament. As a result, the association in 2021 had a deficit of 6.3 billion yen, the biggest in its history. The association's finances recovered by March 2024, with a surplus of 300 million yen.

Also in 2020, the association, along with Nippon Professional Baseball and the Professional Golfers' Association of Japan, withdrew from the Japan Professional Sports Association. This occurred after the Cabinet Office issued a recommendation urging the Japan Professional Sports Association to reform its internal organization, which was inadequate to supervise other public interest incorporated foundations.

In 2022, for the first time in its history, the association signed a partnership agreement with a local government, Sumida Ward, to revitalize the district by encouraging sumo wrestlers to visit schools, and promote sport and tourism. Other agreements also involve Chukyo University and Jissen Women's University in joint projects aimed at designing merchandise and volunteering at tournaments.

In December 2023, the Labor Standards Inspection Office sent the association a rare demand letter for unpaid overtime owed to its administrative staff. Between June and October 2023, the association had also been the subject of five investigations, a rare number for a public interest incorporated foundation. In addition, the association was criticized for managerial problems and cases of moral harassment leading to the suspension of three administrative executives in September, without the situation changing according to the daily Nikkan Sports.

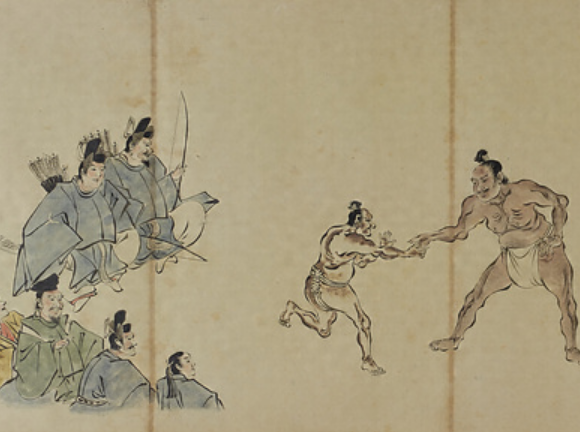
Combat training sumo practiced by samurai during the Heian period. On the left the tachiawase and kazusashi.

In July 2025, the association announced a four-hour special tournament to be held at the Ryōgoku Kokugikan, named "Centennial Tournament — Ancient and Modern Sumo". The event was held on 7 October, with the entire tournament being a tribute to sumo held during the Heian period, with all participants wearing costumes from that era. It marked the first time in 30 years that the association had organized a tournament paying tribute to sumo wrestling from ancient times. Among the tournament's unique features were kami-sumo (ja:神相撲; lit. 'god wrestling') matches, intended to ward off evil spirits and honor Buddha by ending in draws. A special goningakari demonstration match was also held with yokozuna Hōshōryū wrestling against five other lower-ranked wrestlers (Gōnoyama, Hiradoumi, Ura, Rōga, Meisei). The wrestlers were introduced following the gozengakari ceremony, usually reserved for tournaments attended by the emperor or crown prince. Finally, a sandangamae performed by the two yokozuna (Ōnosato and Hōshōryū) was held, a first since 2017. As a sporting entertainment, a tournament was held between teams formed according to ichimon (Dewanoumi A and B, Isegahama, Tokitsukaze A and B, Nishonoseki A and B, and Takasago), with the Dewanoumi A team emerging victorious.

== Organization ==
The Japan Sumo Association is a Public Interest Incorporated Foundation since 2014. Therefore, its functioning is of a non-profit organization and its activities are regulated through a top-down system of government supervision, as well as adherence to strict establishment conditions in exchange of preferential treatments under the Japanese tax system. In practice, this means that the association is exempt from taxes, with the exception of consumption, business and property taxes. Although the association is a foundation, it has borrowed particularities from the statutes of corporations. The association's operations are authorized and defined by the administrative agency of the Act on Authorization of Public Interest Incorporated Associations and Public Interest Incorporated Foundation (Act No. 49 of 2006).

Professor Mark D. West defined the organization of the Association as a "complex" balance of legal rules and informal social norms, referring to both the respect for the law as well as the rules nominally approved by the Ministry of Education, as sumo's supervising agency; and the traditional constraints not enforceable by law, inherited from the long history of sumo as a sport and the history of the association. The association's choice to apply rules or to defect to norms is based on efficiency. In addition to this balance, the association maintains a culture of discretion and secrecy in its management of professional sumo. According to West, the reasons for this secrecy are mainly to control the flow of information, whether negative (scandal) or positive (promotion of a popular wrestler). Such control maintains the positive image of the sport and the mystical culture built up by sumo, linked to its religious roots.

=== The toshiyori kabu system ===
The Japan Sumo Association relations between its members are primarily shaped by rules and norms related to the ownership and transfer of "elder stocks", or shares, held by the association elders. Of all the employees of the association only they can manage the organization. Each share is associated with a particular name, and in the sumo world the former wrestler will be known by that name, usually with the suffix -oyakata. The members are also often called elders in English.

Former wrestlers gain the right to participate in the management of the association by inheriting a share (called a kabu), of which there are 105. The value of these shares was extremely high and rules only permits former sumo wrestlers who either reached at least a san'yaku rank (komusubi or higher) or been ranked for a significant number of tournaments as a sekitori to inherit them. Japanese citizenship is also a prerequisite. Retired wrestlers may own several shares at the same time and exchange or loan them, often in order to inherit a name that affiliates them with a particular stable or tradition. The association delegates the selection of the wrestlers who can inherits these shares to former shareholders who, by tradition, retain the power to choose their successors. It however have a say in the transmission, mainly to ensure that eligibility requirements are met, ensuring that only the best wrestlers can in turn become coaches. The association also manages the shares of deceased or definitively-retired former members that have not been reallocated after a five-year period.

Before the association became a Public Interest Incorporated Foundation, the elder shares were to be purchased and there was a highly speculative market, which prevented many wrestlers from remaining in the association because the price of a share was too high. At the end of the 90s, this value was around 100 to 400 million yen. Since the introduction of the Japan Sumo Association as a Public Interest Incorporated Foundation, the shares are technically no longer purchasable, but rather managed by the Association. Normally, if money is exchanged as part of the inheritance of a share, the appointment of the new holder may be invalidated and the offender subjected to disciplinary measures, up to and including expulsion from the association. However, the monetization of the shares' inheritance still seems to be tolerated by the association.

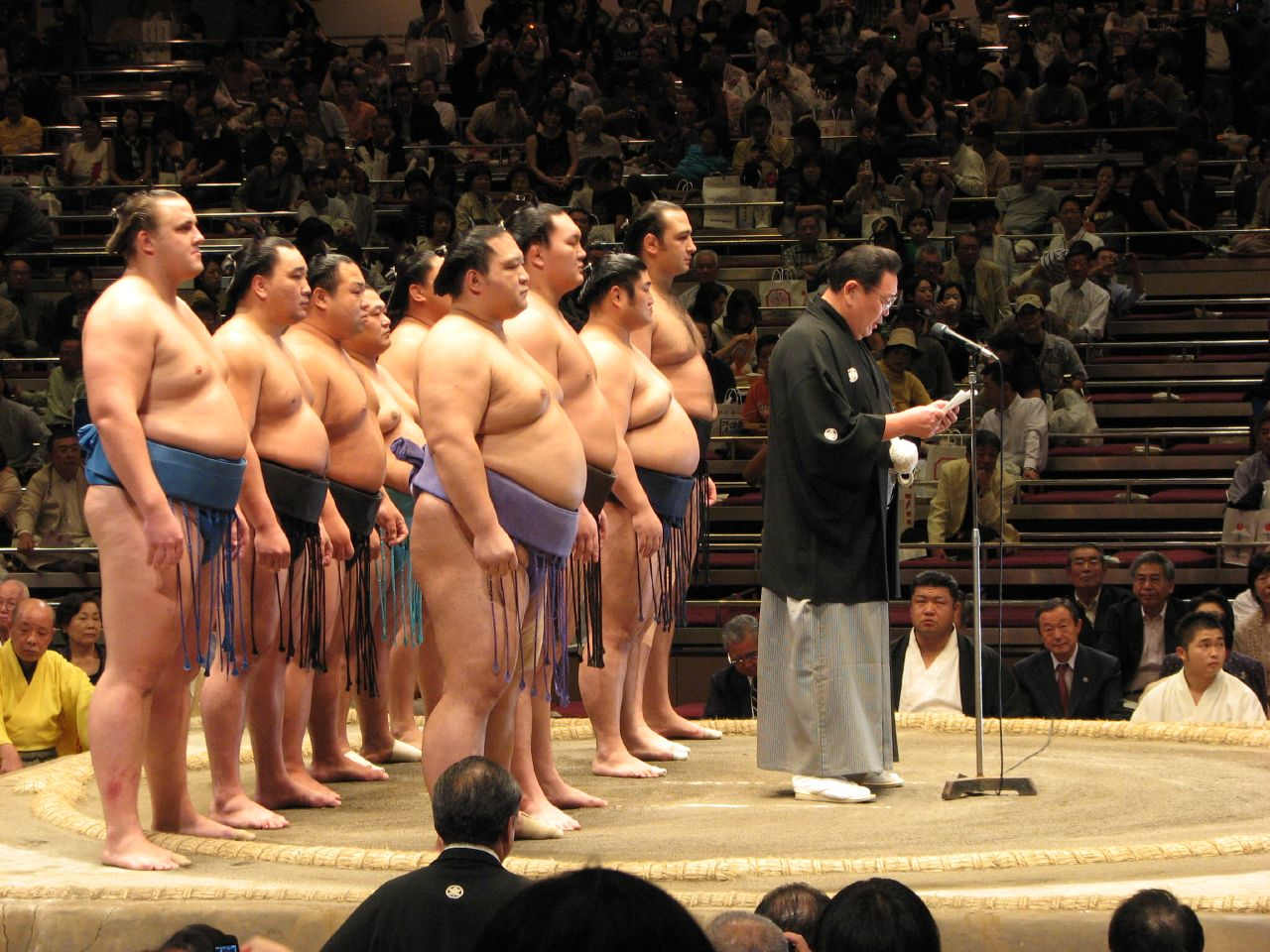
JSA chairman Musashigawa (former Mienoumi) addresses the public at the beginning of the last day of the 2008 September tournament.

An exception to the normal acquisition is made for the most successful rikishi, with era-defining yokozuna being offered a "single generation" or "lifetime" elder stock, called ichidai toshiyori (一代年寄). This process allows the wrestler to stay as an elder without having to use a traditional share in the association, and enter his retirement duties with his ring name. This exception system has been offered to three former wrestlers : Taihō, Kitanoumi and Takanohana. A fourth, Chiyonofuji, was offered this status but preferred a normal share and became known as Kokonoe. These four all achieved more than twenty tournament championships in their active careers. In October 2021, Yokozuna Hakuhō, the Emperor's Cup number record holder, was however denied the ichidai toshiyori kabu and Masayuki Yamauchi (a Yokozuna Deliberation Council member) declared to a press conference that "no such system exists" under the new Public Interest Incorporated Foundation statutes of the association, implying that the system would no longer be used.

The elders of the Association receive a salary that depends on their rank within the association. They are expected to assist in the running of both their stable, called heya in Japanese (but changed to -beya as a suffix) and the association. They do this by performing a diversity of tasks, from selling tickets and security work at the most junior level, to taking charge of one of the Association departments as a director.

These members are also the only persons given the authority to train new sumo wrestlers. They do this by opening or taking over stable, which will take the same name as the founder's elder name. Thus someone known as Dewanoumi is the owner of Dewanoumi stable. A few coaches have their own stable, while the rest are required to be affiliated with one and assist the principal owner. It is common for the most senior members of the Association to concentrate on their Association responsibilities and pass the day-to-day management of a stable to another. If a senior coach wishes to do this, the two may elect to swap names so that the stable can keep the more prestigious name. Examples include, when the Association's chairman Dewanoumi (former yokozuna Sadanoyama), swapped names with Sakaigawa (former sekiwake Washūyama) who took over the running of Dewanoumi stable in 1996, or the transfer of the elder share "Kokonoe" from former yokozuna Kitanofuji to former yokozuna Chiyonofuji in exchange for the title "Jinmaku", allowing Chiyonofuji to inherit Kokonoe stable in 1992.

All members are required to retire when they reach the age of sixty-five (with a possible five-year extension if approved by the board of directors), after which they can pass their name to another, provided that person meets the association's eligibility requirements. In the case of a lifetime share mentioned above, the name merely lapses.

=== Other personnel ===
The association employs a certain number of other personnel, mainly to assist in the running of tournaments. Therefore, auxiliary personnel such as gyōji (referees), yobidashi (ushers) and tokoyama (hairdressers) are all employees of the association. In contrast to wrestlers, all members employed in these roles may generally stay in the association until retirement age. The association provides their training, usually conducted by seniors in their field of activity, and ranks them. Before the association's transition to the Public Interest Incorporated Foundation, the two highest-ranking gyōji (called tate-gyōji) were on the association's board along with the toshiyori.

In addition, a limited number of positions do exist for retired wrestlers who did not fulfill the requirements for inheriting a kabu, and would otherwise have to leave the sumo world upon their retirement from active competition. These former wrestlers are kept within the association as contract employees, customarily retaining their old shikona as their professional name, and are employed to handle various tasks. They are separated into two distinct roles:

- Up to eight wakaimonogashira (若者頭), or "youth leaders", serving as officials of the association. They typically work at their former stables or within the associated ichimon. Wakaimonogashira are tasked with arranging maezumō matches and supervising young sumo wrestlers from makushita and below. They also appear in public next to the dohyō during the honbasho closing ceremony, receiving the trophies given to the tournament winner to return them backstage.
- Up to thirteen sewanin (世話人), or "caretakers", work as transportation and storage managers, handling association equipment used for tournaments and regional tours. In addition they deal with miscellaneous, primarily physical tasks, as instructed by the master of the stable they belong to, or other association members (including wakaimonogashira).

== Missions ==
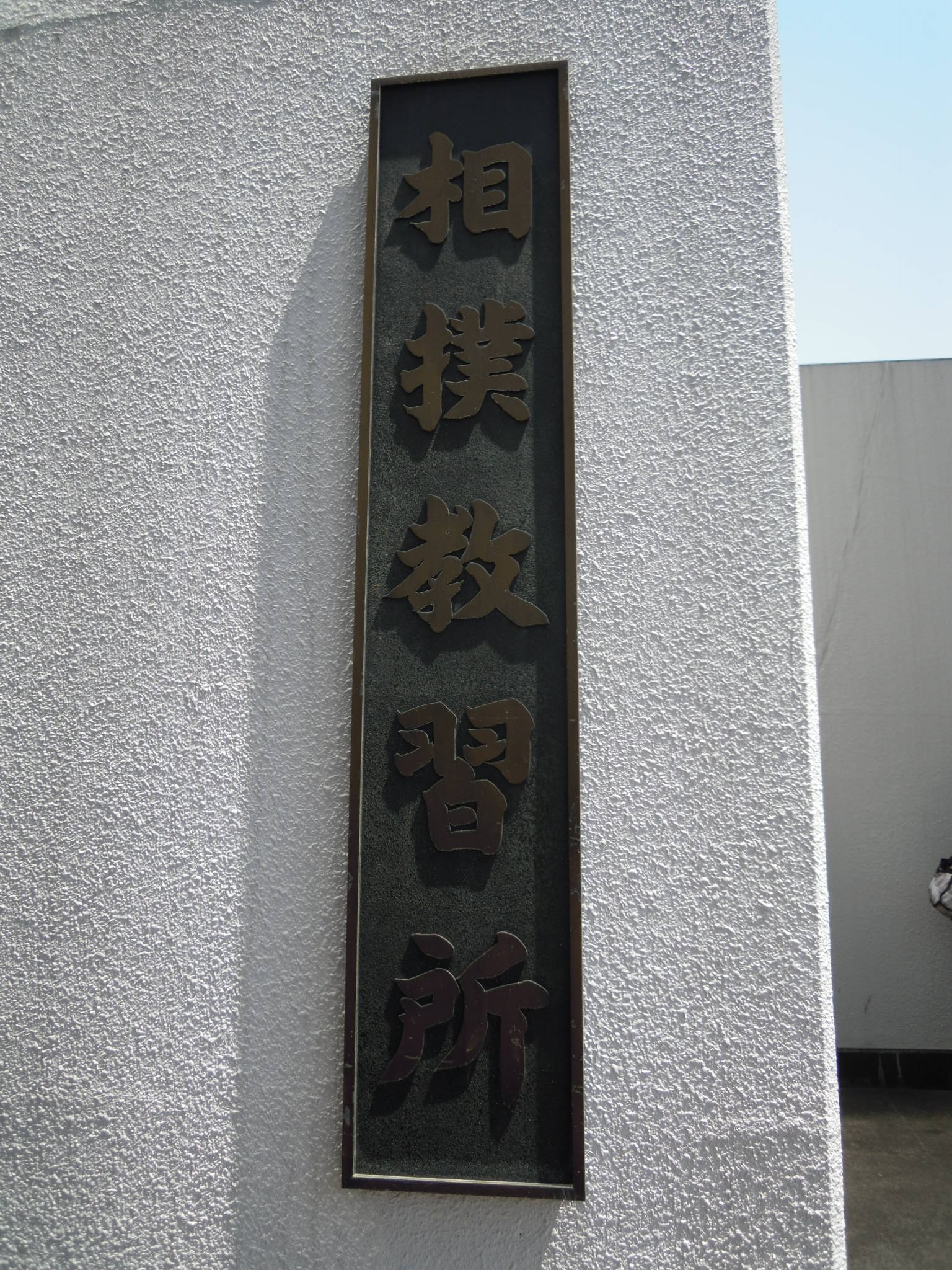
The sumo school's signboard at the Ryōgoku Kokugikan.

The JSA is more than just a sports organization. Its status as an Incorporated Foundation makes it an organization of cultural purpose. However, the complex structure of the association means that it carries out its missions as both a company involved in promoting sport, in particular by selling tickets for tournaments, and as a cultural entity due to its historical links with the Shinto religion and its links with the imperial family, which is also responsible for training its young students.

In order to maintain and develop the traditions and order of Sumo, the association is mainly responsible for holding competitive tournaments (called honbasho) in January, March, May, July, September and November. The association also holds regional tours (called jungyō). The Japan Sumo Association holds these tournaments each year with different purposes for each kind. Main tournaments are televised and help to maintain the interest of sumo as a sport by broadcasting the competitions. The jungyō meanwhile are important for the popularity of wrestlers and allow fans to meet them in the form of meet and greet events.

The association is also responsible for the recruitment, instruction and training of wrestlers via the heya system or the Sumo School. Although not all wrestlers are salaried (only sekitori ranked wrestlers are), the association provides a small allowance to all of them. Depending on the wrestler's performance during tournaments, the association is also responsible of the wrestlers ranking. As wrestlers are not the only employees of the association, it also oversees the recruitment of yobidashi, tokoyama and gyōji to maintain the traditional settings of Sumo. Non-traditional occupations are also the responsibility of the association, in particular to maintain the operation of businesses linked to the association (such as the Kokugikan sales department, the restaurant or the yakitori skewer factory).

Bearing the responsibility of the sport's long history, the association oversees the preservation and utilization of sumo archives. It also collects various types of objects linked to sumo wrestlers (such as keshō-mawashi, tachi or tsuna belts) which are stored and exhibited in the Sumo Museum.

== Departments ==
=== Association organization ===
The association is ruled by a series of departments and committees into which the oyakata are divided when they enter their new career as coaches. The association's departments are organised as follows:

Department	Role	Notes
Sumo School	An institution that educates and train new apprentices for 6 months (1 year for foreign wrestlers).	
Guidance Promotion Department	A department that aims to hand down the techniques and traditions of sumo through training, sumo classes, and the publication of works. Even though it is called a department, all the toshiyori below the "committee member" rank (iin) belong to it.	
Life Guidance Committee	An ethics committee tasked to prevent polemics to emerge from the wrestlers' attitude. In addition to the directors, deputy directors, and special executives, all the masters in the association belong to it, therefore each stables must comply to what has been decided by the committee. Also provides second career support for former sumo wrestlers.	
Compliance Department	Established in 2018 "to eradicate violence in the sumo world" by creating a network of whistleblowers. Each of the five ichimon (clans) have an appointed oyakata in charge of compliance. If a problem arises, the board of directors is removed from the case and the information is passed on to the counselor committee, which appoints an investigation committee made up of lawyers.	
Operations Department	Department responsible for the implementation and operation of the honbasho in Tokyo.	
Judging Department	Department that coordinates the shimpan, judges the honbasho outcomes and prepares the matches.	The number of committee members is limited to 20. Appointment to this committee is considered prestigious.
Regional Honbasho Department	Department responsible for the implementation and operation of local tournaments in Osaka, Nagoya and Fukuoka.	
Jungyō Department	Department responsible for the implementation and operation of local tours.	
Public Relations Department	Performs public relations work both domestically and internationally. In addition, the department in charge of filming, production and management of videos.	
Competition Supervision Committee	A department whose purpose is to prevent, monitor, and punish intentionally lethargic techniques and match-fixing during tournaments. Members are elected and appointed by the board of directors from among the oyakata.	
Museum Steering Committee	Operates the Sumo Museum and maintains, stores and exhibits historical materials related to sumo. The Sumo Museum is also in charge of publishing researchs. Directors are appointed for a three-year term. Most of them are former yokozuna who have retired from the association. Several directors participates to the running of the museum.	
Sumo Association Clinic	The center mainly provides consultations for association members. There are departments of internal medicine, surgery, orthopedics, and physical therapy, and they are located in the Kokugikan. Injured wrestlers are treated here after their bouts.	

=== Advisory body ===
To this organization adds an advisory body called the Yokozuna Deliberation Council.

Department	Role
Yokozuna Deliberation Council	An organization composed of experts outside the association and mainly recommending rikishi for promotion to yokozuna.

== Elections ==
The possession of a toshiyori kabu is essential for the functioning of association as elders, assembled in a board of trustees called hyōgiin-kai (評議員会), votes for the board of the association. Elections are held in even-numbered years or every two years, usually in January or February.

The election process is heavily influenced by the stables regroupments to which coaches are distributed in. Each stable belong to an ichimon, or clan. There are currently five ichimon, each bearing the name of its leading stable: Dewanoumi, Isegahama, Nishonoseki, Takasago and Tokitsukaze. The ichimon serves as quasi-political groupings, each clan nominating candidates for the ten positions or so that are available on the association's board each election cycle. Each vote is normally along the interests of the ichimon, which explain why the bigger clans more often holds the association's chairmanship. Former wrestler popularity however plays a role in the credit given to an application. For example, former yokozuna Takanohana won four straight election bids to become director before his demotion in 2018, despite being the leader of a (now dissolved) small ichimon.

Stables aren't equally divided among the ichimon. As of July 2024, Nishonoseki has the most stables with 17, but Dewanoumi has the most affiliated oyakata (elders) with 37. (Note: As of October 2024, Nishonoseki have 17 stables, followed by Dewanoumi (14), Isegahama (5), Tokitsukaze (5) and Takasago (4). However Dewanoumi have 37 affiliated oyakata, followed by Nishonoseki (27), Tokitsukaze (16), Isegahama (11) and Takasago (11). Three shares are currently vacant, with two traditionally belonging to the Dewanoumi ichimon and one to the Nishonoseki ichimon.)

As in the political world intrigue, subterfuge, splits and new coalitions are ordinary. The oyakata have a lot of leeway and can decide many things on their own. In fact, some elders change stables, move their stable to different ichimon or break off from their clan. For example, the Kokonoe stable was founded in 1967 after Yokozuna Chiyonoyama failed to gain control of the Dewanoumi stable. The break off that ensued saw the stable leaving the Dewanoumi ichimon to join the Takasago ichimon. Also, in 2010, Takanohana stable (run under the "lifetime share" system by the eponymous yokozuna) broke off from the Nishonoseki ichimon (with Ōnomatsu stable, Ōtake stable and Magaki stable) as he wanted to present himself to the board's election and his clan would not permit it. He became the leader of its own group, which was then formally recognized as an ichimon (called Takanohana ichimon) in 2014. The ichimon was however short lived and was disbanded in 2018 after the Takanoiwa affair. Until 2018, there have been non-aligned stables, or loose coalitions that weren't formal ichimon, but in 2018 the association ruled that all stables had to belong to one of the current ichimon.

== Board of the Association ==
The Japan Sumo Association's board is composed of a board of directors, under which several deputy directors and special executives operate, namely three vice-directors and a yakuin taigū iin (役員待遇委員, executive treatment committee).

The board of directors elects a chairman, called rijichō, from among themselves. Directors other than the chairman serve as department heads. Among them, the role of Operations director is considered to be the association's number 2. Each board member serves a two-year term.

Directors, called riji, are elected by a single anonymous vote by all the elders, assembled in a board of trustees called hyōgiin-kai (評議員会), from candidates selected among the toshiyori. Since 1968, the number of directors on the board has been limited to ten elders. Prior to 2014, four active sumo wrestlers serving as representatives and both the tate-gyōji had the right to sit on the board and vote, but with the transition to a public interest incorporated foundation both wrestlers and referees lost their right to be on the board.

In the wake of scandals, reforms were undertaken to better supervise the decisions of the Board of Directors, introducing two entities into the management of the association. In September 2008, three external directors were appointed at the Ministry of Education's insistence. One of the three, Murayama Hiroyoshi, also served as acting chairman for the July 2010 tournament while the then head, Musashigawa (former Mienoumi), was suspended.

A counselor committee was introduced in 2014 to facilitate dialogue between the ministry and the association. This committee, called hyōgi-in (評議員), is made up equally of retired wrestlers (with no san'yo re-employment) elected within the association and personalities appointed by the ministry. Their rank equals that of a director to the association's board. Elders on the committee are not allowed to concurrently serve as oyakata because of the committee authority that allows them to have a say in the appointment and dismissal of directors. Each counselor serves a term of four years. Having the task of "overseeing the execution of duties by the directors", auditors may attend meetings of the board of directors and the Board of Trustees, but have no voting rights. Former association-elected members who decide to return to the association after their term on the hyōgi-in may do so after being auditioned by a reviewing committee.

The current Board of Directors is composed as follows (as of March 2026):

Position		Name (Note: Former wrestlers use their toshiyori kabu (elder title) during their terms.)	Ichimon and occupation
Chairman; Rijichō 理事長		Hakkaku Nobuyoshi	Takasago
Director; Riji 理事	Operations director	Dewanoumi Akikazu	Dewanoumi
Director; Riji 理事	Museum Steering Committee	Dewanoumi Akikazu	Dewanoumi
Director; Riji 理事	Sumo School director	Dewanoumi Akikazu	Dewanoumi
Director; Riji 理事	Regional basho director (Osaka)	Isenoumi Hayato	Tokitsukaze
Director; Riji 理事	Crisis Management director	Sadogatake Mitsumune	Nishonoseki
Director; Riji 理事	Responsible for general planning	Sadogatake Mitsumune	Nishonoseki
Director; Riji 理事	Compliance Department director	Sadogatake Mitsumune	Nishonoseki
Director; Riji 理事	Museum Steering Committee	Sadogatake Mitsumune	Nishonoseki
Director; Riji 理事	Jungyō director	Takadagawa Katsumi	Nishonoseki
Director; Riji 理事	Life Guidance director	Takadagawa Katsumi	Nishonoseki
Director; Riji 理事	Guidance Promotion director	Takadagawa Katsumi	Nishonoseki
Director; Riji 理事	Museum Steering Committee	Takadagawa Katsumi	Nishonoseki
Director; Riji 理事	Judging Department chairman	Asakayama Hiroyuki	Isegahama
Director; Riji 理事	In charge of new apprentice inspection	Asakayama Hiroyuki	Isegahama
Director; Riji 理事	Public Relations director	Fujishima Takehito	Dewanoumi
Director; Riji 理事	Judging Department assistant chair	Fujishima Takehito	Dewanoumi
Director; Riji 理事	Director for security	Fujishima Takehito	Dewanoumi
Director; Riji 理事	Museum Steering Committee	Fujishima Takehito	Dewanoumi
Director; Riji 理事	Head of Social Contribution	Fujishima Takehito	Dewanoumi
Director; Riji 理事	In charge of new apprentice inspection	Fujishima Takehito	Dewanoumi
Director; Riji 理事	Regional basho director (Nagoya)	Oitekaze Naoki	Tokitsukaze
Director; Riji 理事	Regional basho director (Fukuoka)	Kataonami Ryōji	Nishonoseki
Director; Riji 理事	Judging Department assistant chair	Onoe Keishi	Dewanoumi
Director; Riji 理事	In charge of new apprentice inspection	Onoe Keishi	Dewanoumi
Director; Riji 理事	External Directors; Gaiburiji 外部理事	Yamaguchi Toshikazu	President of the Yomiuri Shimbun Tokyo Head Office
Director; Riji 理事	External Directors; Gaiburiji 外部理事	Takano Toshio	Attorney. Head of Takano Law Firm, Former Superintendent Public Prosecutor of Nagoya High Public Prosecutors' Office
Director; Riji 理事	External Directors; Gaiburiji 外部理事	Takano Toshio	Crisis Management Committee chairman
Director; Riji 理事	External Directors; Gaiburiji 外部理事	Yoshihiko Shimizu	Former Executive Director of NHK
Director; Riji 理事	External Directors; Gaiburiji 外部理事	Yoshihiko Shimizu	Toshiyori Qualification Review Committee chairman
Auditors; Kanji 監事		Kajiki Hisashi	Public prosecutor. Former Superintending Prosecutor of Takamatsu High Public Prosecutors Office. Member of Japanese Supreme Court (Supreme Court Administrative Appeal Review Committee)
Auditors; Kanji 監事		Fukui Ryōji	Former Vice Minister (Ministry of Internal Affairs and Communications, MIC)
Auditors; Kanji 監事		Kozu Kanna	Writer. First woman appointed to the Japan Sumo Association board.

== List of rijichō ==
Name	Year(s)	Notes	
Hirose Seitoku †	1925–1928	Lieutenant-General in charge of army budget. First Chairman of the Japan Sumo Association. He gradually gave way to General Ono, while remaining a board director and held that position until his death. During the last years of his term, he helped to resolve the Shunjuen Incident. After his death, the association was managed by two other officers (Shizutaro Nishioka and Tetsuro Shirato), but they do not appear in the list of former chairmen, being mentioned simply as directors.	
Fukuda Masatarō † acting chairman	1928–1930	Appointed director of the association at the same time as Hirose Seitoku, the two soldiers then sharing responsibilities. Hirose was however recognized as the association's first chairman. Fukuda was later appointed chairman of the association.	Patrons of martial arts. It was not uncommon for an organization or a corporation to have a military officer, retired politician or high-ranking bureaucrat as its chairman. Although these officers ran the Association, their position as chairman is often considered unofficial.
Ono Minobu † acting chairman	1930–1939	Appointed chairman of the association between 1930 and 1939. Participated in the erection of the chikara-zuka, a memorial to past wrestlers at the Ekō-in temple, with his name signing the dedication on the back of the monument.	Patrons of martial arts. It was not uncommon for an organization or a corporation to have a military officer, retired politician or high-ranking bureaucrat as its chairman. Although these officers ran the Association, their position as chairman is often considered unofficial.
Isamu Takeshita † acting chairman	1939–1945	Appointed chairman in May 1939. He held the position until November 1945.	Patrons of martial arts. It was not uncommon for an organization or a corporation to have a military officer, retired politician or high-ranking bureaucrat as its chairman. Although these officers ran the Association, their position as chairman is often considered unofficial.
Fujishima Hidemitsu / Dewanoumi Hidemitsu †	1945–1957	First chairman from the ranks of wrestlers. Founded the Kuramae Kokugikan. Changed kabu in 1949, in middle of his term. Attempted to commit suicide by seppuku and gas in May 1957 after internal conflicts within the association prompted a reaction from the National Diet. Rescued, he stood down of the chairmanship but stayed the head of his stable.	
Tokitsukaze Sadaji †	1957–1968	Started a series of radical reforms. Remained in charge of the association until his death from hepatitis in 1968.	
Musashigawa Yoshihide †	1968–1974	Pursued the efforts for modernizing sumo.	
Kasugano Kiyotaka †	1974–1988	Longest serving chairman to date. Founded the current Ryōgoku Kokugikan.	
Futagoyama Kanji †	1988–1992		
Dewanoumi Tomotaka / Sakaigawa Shō †	1992–1998	Pursued the efforts for modernizing sumo. Changed kabu in 1996, in middle of his term. Resigned in the middle of his fourth term in 1998 after the association's board became mostly occupied by a rival faction.	
Tokitsukaze Katsuo	1998–2002	Before being chairman of the association, elected as a director at the age of 32 years old (the youngest ever for a director of the Japan Sumo Association). First ōzeki elected to the position.	
Kitanoumi Toshimitsu †	2002–2008	First chairman under the age of 50 in half a century. His first term was marked with scandal such as the 2007 hazing scandal and cannabis use by wrestlers. Resigned his post in 2008.	
Musashigawa Akihide	2008–2010	Suspended in 2010 after a series of scandals involving wrestlers gambling and associating with organised crime members. He announced his resignation the month following his suspension.	
Murayama Hiroyoshi acting chairman	2010	Former Chief Public Prosecutor. Appointed acting chairman of the Japan Sumo Association following the baseball gambling scandal in 2010. It was the first time in 66 years that a non-professional sumo wrestler was appointed to the top of the Japan Sumo Association since Takeshita Isamu.	
Hanaregoma Teruyuki †	2010–2012	Entangled in a match-fixing scandal in 2011, he announced an independent investigation and drew criticism from sumo commentators. Stood down from the chairmanship in 2012 as he was close to the mandatory retirement age of 65.	
Kitanoumi Toshimitsu †	2012–2015	Became the first person to head the association twice. Died in office in 2015 due to hydronephrosis and anemia.	
Hakkaku Nobuyoshi current	since 2015	Appointed in 2015 after Kitanoumi's death to serve as acting chairman until the end of the terms. Officially elected in 2016 after defeating Takanohana in a contested ballot.	

== Controversies ==
In the decade from 2007 to 2017, the association had to deal with a number of affairs like the Tokitsukaze stable disciple assault death case (2007), the case of foreign sumo wrestlers possessing and smoking cannabis (2008), the baseball gambling and match-fixing scandal (2010-2011), Yokozuna Harumafuji's assault incident (2017) and the ban on women. While the association had always benefited from leniency on a certain number of its practices, the evolutions of Japanese society and the ever more frequent media coverage of the scandals surrounding the association contributed to the reaction of the latter and to the establishment of reforms in this world yet governed by immutable rules.

=== Links with criminals ===
In 2010, the Japan Sumo Association announced its decision to dismiss Ōzeki Kotomitsuki and Ōtake (former Takatōriki), for betting on baseball games in a gambling ring run by the yakuza. At the same time, two stable masters were demoted and an unprecedented 18 wrestlers banned from the July 2010 tournament. Sumo Association chairman Hanaregoma declared in August 2010 that "violent groups or antisocial forces" were being banned from accessing tournament venues, training stables and other facilities. The association issued a statement on the matter, stating "the Japan Sumo Association are aware of their social responsibility and declare that they will work to eliminate anti-social forces such as organized crime groups". Since then, members of organized crime groups are not allowed in sumo venues (such as the Ryōgoku Kokugikan), stables, supporters' associations and celebrations.

=== Unequal treatments and accusation of racism ===
As the association have the mission to perpetuate sumo traditions, a certain number of its practices and comments are often seen as dated. The treatment of injured wrestlers is often pointed out as unfair. In recent times, both yokozuna Hakuhō and Kakuryū drove criticism from the Yokozuna Deliberation Council for extended periods where they sat out tournaments due to injury. However, in the meantime, injured Japanese yokozuna Kisenosato did not get any critics and rather had encouragement from the council. The difference of treatment prompted criticism on the supposed preferential treatment.

The inequality of treatment between wrestlers also drove suspicion of racism within the institution. The controversy arose when The Nihon Keizai Shimbun reported that Samoan-born ōzeki Konishiki had alleged racial discrimination was the reason for him being denied promotion to sumo's top rank of yokozuna. The New York Times subsequently quoted Konishiki as saying, "If I were Japanese, I would be yokozuna already." The Japan Sumo Association demanded an apology. Konishiki held a press conference during which he made his apology and tearfully denied making the remarks.

More recently, during the retirement of era defining Hakuhō , the "Experts' Meeting on the Succession and Development of Grand Sumo" (directed by Yamauchi Masayuki, a member of the Yokozuna Deliberation Council), which the Japan Sumo Association consulted on how sumo should be in response to the new era, suddenly came up with a proposal for "the abolition of the ichidai toshiyori kabu." The reason mentioned was that "there is no provision in the articles of incorporation of the association that serves as a basis." The association faced severe criticism in particular on the basis of previous suspicions of racism. However it is assumed the decision was taken to prevent the rise of another Takanohana controversy by giving a wrestler too much prestige.

=== Violence and hazing ===
Sumo stables were well known for their systematic hazing and physical punishment of young disciples in order to "toughen them up". Stablemasters have often been proud to show to the media how they frequently use a shinai to beat those who fall out of line, and elder wrestlers are often put in charge of bullying younger ones to keep them in line, for instance, by making them hold heavy objects for long periods of time. Also, the strict sumo hierarchy where senior and high-ranking wrestlers take responsibility to train their juniors often led to violence as in sumo the rank is a symbol of status.

The system of hazing was widely criticized in late 2007. A hazing scandal was exposed in which a Tokitsukaze stable's 17-year-old sumo trainee died after a serious bullying incident involving his stablemaster Jun'ichi Yamamoto hitting him on the head with a large beer bottle and fellow rikishi being subsequently ordered to physically abuse him further. The stablemaster and three other wrestlers who were involved were arrested in February 2008, after which Japanese Prime Minister Yasuo Fukuda demanded the JSA take steps to ensure such an incident never happens again. In May 2009, Yamamoto was sentenced to six years in jail.

Violence affairs also came up to light in 2017, when Japanese newspaper Sports Nippon reported that Yokozuna Harumafuji had assaulted fellow Mongolian wrestler Takanoiwa during a regional sumo tour in Tottori in late October. According to the report and other sources, Harumafuji was drinking with other sumo wrestlers (including Hakuhō, Kakuryū and Terunofuji) and was admonishing Takanoiwa over his behavior. Angered that Takanoiwa was looking at his cell phone at the time, Harumafuji struck him in the head with a beer bottle and punched him 20 to 30 times. Harumafuji was then questioned by the Sumo Association's crisis management panel, where he admitted to assaulting Takanoiwa.

On October 25, 2018, the association issued a statement introducing external experts involved in training, operation of procedures, and other measures to prevent the recurrence of violence. However, this did not stop the violence scandals, and, on December 26, 2022, Isegahama announced his resignation as director after a case of violence, where two junior wrestlers in his stable acted violently against younger wrestlers, with the victims beaten with wooden beams and burned with chankonabe hot water poured on their backs. In May 2023, Michinoku stable's senior wrestler, Kirinofuji, assaulted another young wrestler, Yasunishi, who had to take the matter to the press to trigger a response. Stablemaster Michinoku was accused of having covered these facts of violence by contributing directly to the fact that the aggressor can remain within the stable then letting him retire with dignity and without any charges brought against him. Hanakago, the director of the Compliance Department, is also criticized for having let the aggressor go unpunished, despite having been informed late and by the victim.

In March 2023 a former lower-ranked wrestler in Sadogatake stable, Daisuke Yanagihara, sued the Japan Sumo Association and his former stablemaster (ex-Kotonowaka) on allegations that he was forced to quit the sport. Yanagihara claimed that his human rights were violated and that, during the COVID-19 pandemic when the Sumo Association instituted health protocols, he was denied his request to sit out of the January 2021 tournament over fears of contracting the virus following cardiac surgery. In the lawsuit, Yanagihara also alleged mistreatment of lower-ranked wrestlers in his former stable, such as being served meals containing meat that was years beyond its expiration date. As of July 2023 the Sumo Association has not commented on the allegations.

== General communication ==
=== Logo ===
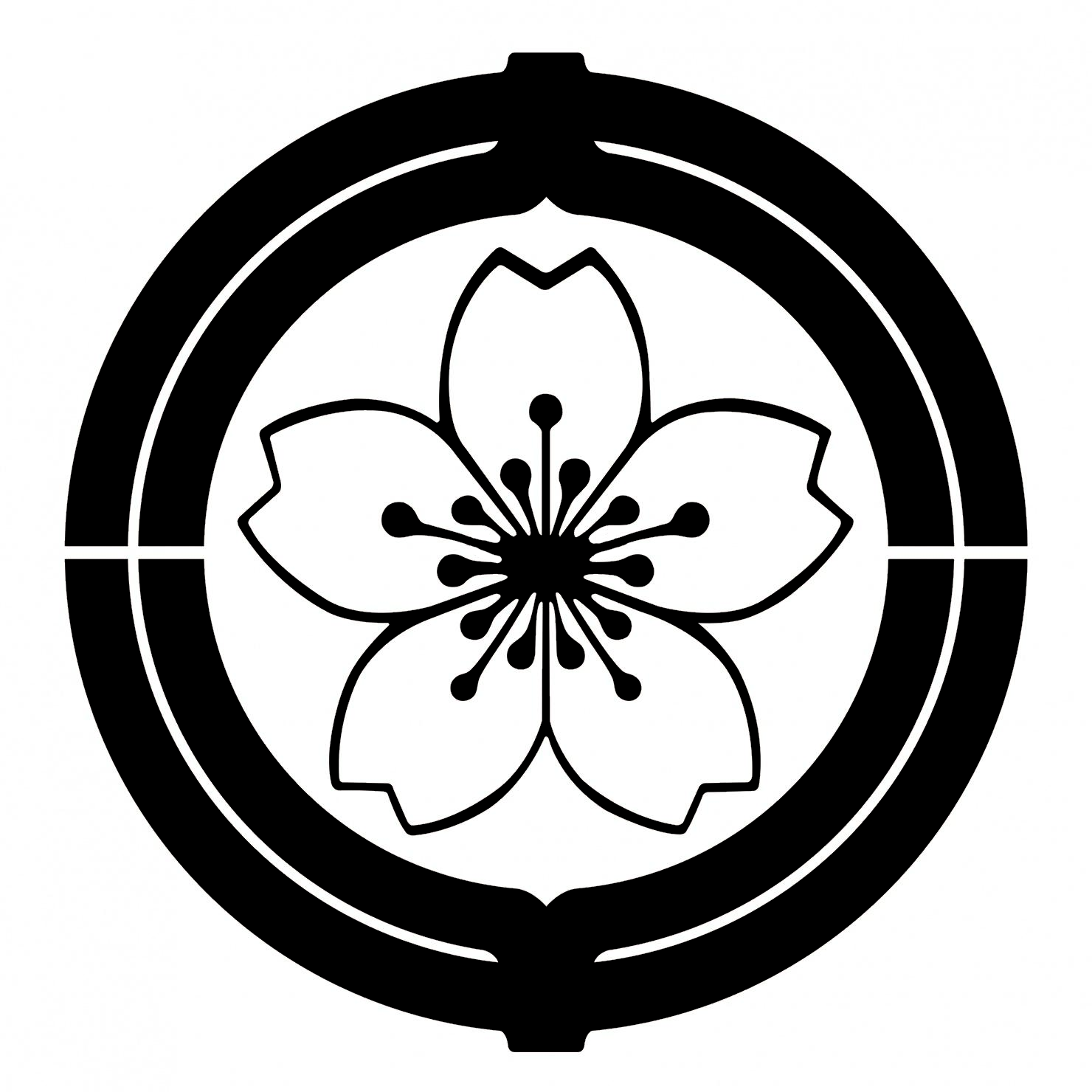
The cherry blossom shaped logo of the Association

The Japan Sumo Association, like most institutions, owns a mon. The design is based on cherry blossom, which is the national flower of Japan. Around the flower, two stylized characters for 'big' or 'great' (大), extracted from the kanjis of professional sumo, called ōzumo (大相撲), can be seen. The logo was created in 1909 for the opening of the first Ryōgoku Kokugikan.

This symbol can be found in various places when the association holds celebration. It can be mainly seen on the tsuriyane's (suspended roof above the dohyō) curtains, called mizuhiki (水引). The wrestler who performs the yumitori-shiki (bow-twirling ceremony) also wears a keshō-mawashi decorated with this emblem.

=== Sumo's boost in popularity ===
In the early 2020s, professional sumo experienced a popularity boost, launched, according to Nishiiwa (former Wakanosato), by Yokozuna Hakuhō's period of dominance and the rise in visibility of foreign fans and su-jo (スー女), female fans commonly known as oshikatsu (推し活), displaying their passion for sumo and wrestlers on social networks. After the period of scandal, the association also set about restoring a positive public image by launching various measures. These included strengthening the JSA's presence on social networks and developing merchandising. To develop the international market, the association also undertook to translate all its publications into English. Finally, the JSA created an official fan club in order to develop its fan base, offering them in return easier access to tournament tickets and inviting them to various festivals held at the Kokugikan.

=== Ukiyo-e ===
In 1985, the Japan Sumo Association created a partnership with nishiki-e artist Kinoshita Daimon in the hope of reviving old sumo ukiyo-e works. He collaborated on the official ebanzuke. His portraits of wrestlers are sold at the Ryōgoku Kokugikan.

=== Mascots ===
Hiyonoyama, the chicken mascot of the Japan Sumo Association

In August 2009, the Japan Sumo Association unveiled a group of official mascots under the title Hakkiyoi! Sekitori-kun (ハッキヨイ！せきトリくん). Designed to get more children interested in the sport, the characters are chickens (鶏, which can be read as とり, tori in Japanese) as chicken are considered good luck in sumo. A chicken walks on two legs, not four; similarly, a sumo wrestler loses the match if he is knocked off his feet and touches the ground with his hands or any part of his body. The characters compete in sumo and are centered around main character Hiyonoyama (ひよの山), a pun on hiyo (ぴよ) meaning chick, and his rival Akawashi (赤鷲). Mascot development included manga publishing and the installation of sticker dispensers at the Kokugikan. Plush toys were also created to popularize the mascots.

== Online presence ==
=== YouTube channels ===
The Japan Sumo Association launched its first YouTube channel in November 2018, with content all in Japanese language. The channel offers light-hearted and humoristic videos, such as a golf competition between former yokozuna Hakuhō, Kisenosato and Kakuryū or chankonabe receipes with small skits featuring low-ranking wrestlers. It also provides more serious contents with insights on ceremonies held in the Kokugikan, such as the consecration of the dohyō before each tournaments or danpatsu-shiki (hair cutting ceremony). Old tournaments are also regularly reruned on the channel.

In August 2022, the association launched an English-language YouTube channel called Sumo Prime Time in hopes of drawing a larger international audience to the sport. This new channel, presented by former NHK sumo sportscaster Hiroshi Morita, provides basic sumo explanations such as rikishi routine or training and kimarite moves. It also provides exclusive interviews of oyakata and rikishi, generally the winner of the previous tournament. The general tone of the channel is light-hearted.

=== Smartphone application ===
In 2019, the association launched its official mobile app, named "Ōzumō", in partnership with Dwango. The app broadcasts matches from the sekitori ranks with commentary from celebrities. Viewing changes depending on whether you're a paying member (unlimited content) or accessing free content (limited to one match viewed per day). Rankings and results by tournament day are also available.

== See also ==
- List of sumo elders
- List of sumo stables
- Heya, sumo stable
- Toshiyori, sumo elder
- International Sumo Federation
- Glossary of sumo terms
