= Kokugikan =

Kokugikan (国技館, Kokugi-kan), or "Stadium of the National Sport", may refer to the following sumo venues:

- Ryōgoku Kokugikan, both the original that existed from 1909 to 1982, and the current building opened in 1985
- Kuramae Kokugikan, built in Tokyo, that existed from 1950 to 1984
- Osaka Kokugikan, that existed from 1919 until 1953
