= Controversies in professional sumo =

Professional sumo has faced a number of controversies throughout its history, ranging from proven match-fixing scandals to allegations of hazing.

== Match-fixing ==
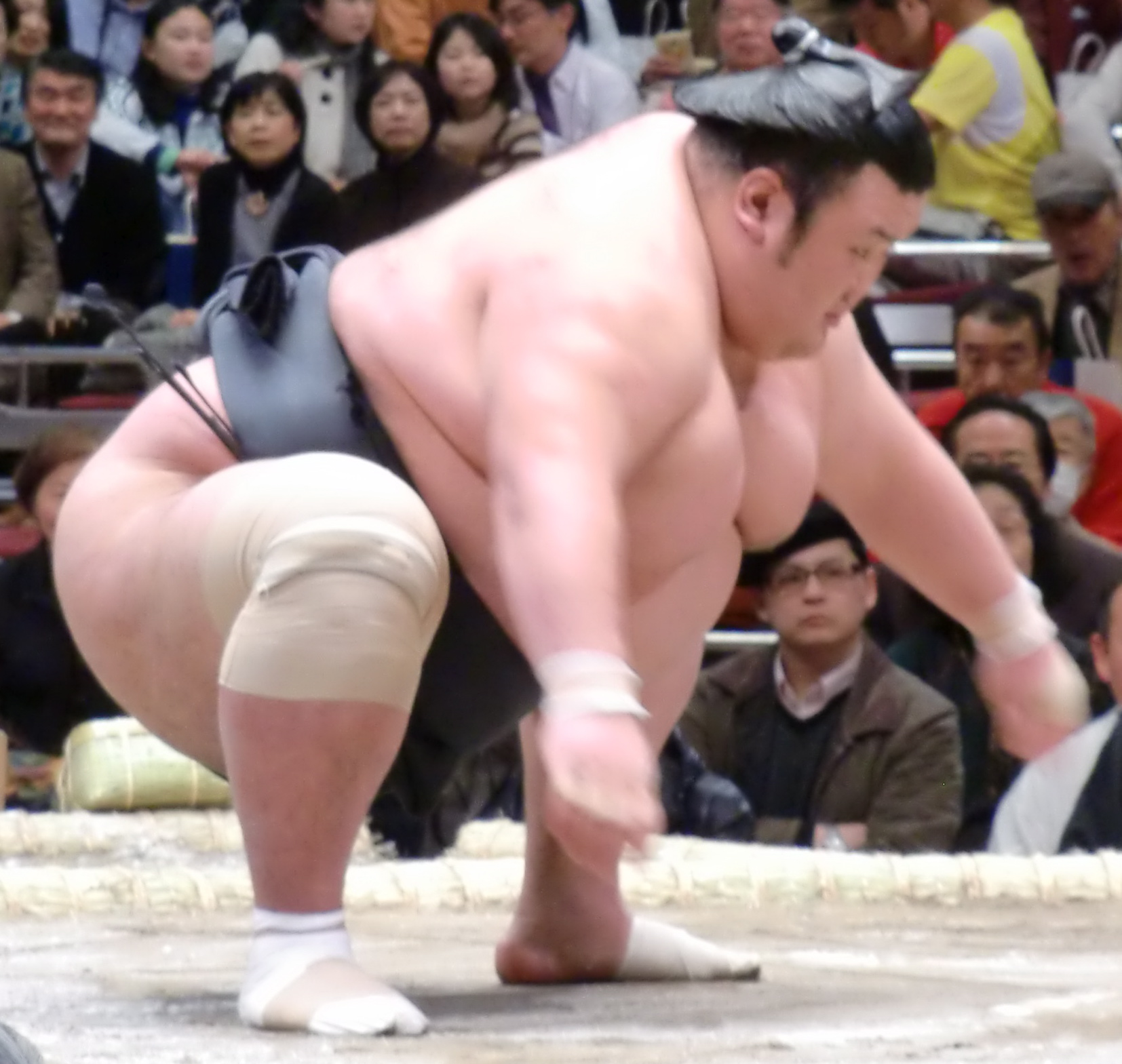
Kiyoseumi was forced to retire after an investigation found him guilty of match-fixing.

Due to the hierarchical structure of the sport, where top ranked wrestlers have great advantages in salary and status over lower ranked wrestlers, speculation about the existence of match-fixing and isolated reports of match fixing have surfaced over the years. The Japan Sumo Association (JSA) repeatedly denied any wrestlers were involved in match-fixing, known as yaocho, and even took publishers to court over such allegations.

In 2002, economists Steven Levitt and Mark Duggan published a paper using econometrics in order to suggest that match-fixing in sumo exists. Popularized in Levitt's book Freakonomics, the study found that 70% of wrestlers with 7–7 records on the final day of the tournament (i.e., seven wins and seven losses, and one fight to go) won. The percentage was found to rise the more times the two wrestlers had met, and decrease when the wrestler was due to retire. The study found that the 7–7 wrestlers won around 80% of the time when statistics suggest they had a probability of winning only 48.7% of the time against their opponents. The authors concluded that those who already have 8 wins collude with those who are 7–7 and let them win, since the 8-win wrestlers had already secured their ranking.

In 2011, it was announced that an investigation by police had discovered cell phone text messages indicating that a number of matches had been fixed. Allegedly, 14 wrestlers and a few stablemasters were involved. In the course of the investigation, several wrestlers eventually admitted to match-fixing for money. As a consequence, the board of directors of the JSA decided in an extraordinary meeting to cancel the March 2011 tournament in Osaka, the first time this had happened since 1946. In all, fourteen wrestlers were judged guilty of match-fixing, to which most of them admitted involvement. All of the wrestlers judged to be involved were forced to retire.

The JSA's investigative panel stated in May 2011 that match-fixing appears to have been widespread. The panel stated that it would be difficult to discover, however, the full extent of the problem. The May 2011 tournament went ahead but with no sponsorship, live TV coverage or trophy presentations, and was referred to as the "Technical Examination Tournament" with free admission to spectators.

One wrestler charged with match-fixing, Sōkokurai, strenuously denied any involvement and won a court case in early 2013 deeming his dismissal groundless. He was subsequently reinstated by the JSA, and appeared in the July 2013 tournament in the top division.

== Gambling and yakuza ties ==
On July 4, 2010, the Japan Sumo Association announced its decision to dismiss the ōzeki Kotomitsuki and the stablemaster Ōtake, former Takatōriki, for betting on baseball games in a gambling ring run by the yakuza. At the same time, two stable masters were demoted and an unprecedented 18 wrestlers banned from the July 2010 tournament. The betting scandal resulted in public broadcaster NHK opting not to air live sumo matches during the tournament, instead showing a daily highlight package. A number of sponsors also withdrew their support for the tournament. Sumo Association chairman Hanaregoma declared in August 2010 that "violent groups or antisocial forces" were being banned from accessing tournament venues, training stables and other facilities.

Three months before Hanaregoma's announcement, Japan's largest yakuza group, Yamaguchi-gumi, bought fifty prized seats during a tournament so that gangsters were prominently visible during the national broadcast of the match. According to experts, this was an endeavor to cheer up an incarcerated boss. Although there have always been alleged ties between sumo and the yakuza, the sport has suffered from waning public interest and sponsorship during the economic recession, which may have contributed to closer ties to the underworld for financial support.

In December 2021 sekitori wrestlers Hidenoumi and Shiden were withdrawn from the January 2022 tournament for suspected involvement in illegal gambling. During the investigation into an illegal establishment in Sōka, Saitama Prefecture that was raided in September 2021, suspicions were raised by the Saitama Prefectural Police about the involvement of both Hidenoumi and Shiden, as well as other sumo wrestlers that may have possibly participated. During the January 2022 basho Japanese media reported that the Sumo Association's compliance committee, after holding hearings, concluded that Hidenoumi and Shiden participated in illegal gambling. Following the tournament's conclusion, the Sumo Association suspended Hidenoumi for one tournament (retroactive to January 2022) and issued a 20% salary cut for two months. No disciplinary action was taken against Shiden. Their stablemaster Kise (former maegashira Higonoumi) was issued a warning. Police declined prosecution the following month.

== Hazing and violence ==
=== Tokitsukaze hazing scandal ===
Sumo stables have long engaged in the systematic hazing and physical punishment of young disciples in order to "toughen them up". Stable masters have often been proud to show to the media how they frequently use a shinai to beat those who fall out of line, and elder wrestlers are often put in charge of bullying younger ones to keep them in line, for instance, by making them hold heavy objects for long periods of time. However, this system of hazing was widely criticized in late 2007 when a hazing scandal came to light, in which a 17-year-old sumo trainee named Takashi Saito from the Tokitsukaze stable died after a serious bullying incident involving his stablemaster Jun'ichi Yamamoto hitting him on the head with a large beer bottle and fellow rikishi being subsequently ordered to physically abuse him further. The stablemaster and three other wrestlers who were involved were arrested in February 2008, after which Japanese Prime Minister Yasuo Fukuda demanded the JSA take steps to ensure such an incident never happens again. In May 2009, Yamamoto was sentenced to six years in jail.

=== Other scandals ===
Violent affairs also came to light in 2017, when Sports Nippon reported that yokozuna Harumafuji had assaulted another wrestler (Takanoiwa) during a regional sumo tour in Tottori. According to the article, Harumafuji was allegedly drinking with other sumo wrestlers and admonished Takanoiwa because he was looking at his cell phone. Harumafuji struck him in the head with a beer bottle and punched him 20 to 30 times. Questioned by the Sumo Association's crisis management panel, Harumafuji admitted to assaulting Takanoiwa. This case triggered the launch of new procedures to ensure that scandals of violence would not be repeated within the Association and in 2018, the Association issued an official statement on the subject.

However, hazing and violence have not disappeared from professional sumo and, in December 2022, Isegahama-oyakata announced his resignation as director after two junior wrestlers in his stable acted violently against younger wrestlers, with the victims beaten with wooden beams and burned with chankonabe hot water poured on their backs.

In March 2023 a former lower-ranked wrestler in Sadogatake stable, Daisuke Yanagihara, sued the Japan Sumo Association and his former stablemaster Sadogatake (ex-Kotonowaka) on allegations that he was forced to quit the sport. Yanagihara claimed that his human rights were violated and that, during the COVID-19 pandemic when the Sumo Association instituted health protocols, Sadogatake denied his request to sit out of the January 2021 tournament over fears of contracting the virus following cardiac surgery. In the lawsuit, Yanagihara also alleged mistreatment of lower-ranked wrestlers in his former stable, such as being served meals containing meat that was years beyond its expiration date. As of July 2023 the Sumo Association has not commented on the allegations.

In May 2023, Michinoku stable was also the subject of a controversy because a senior wrestler, Kirinofuji, assaulted another young wrestler, Yasunishi, with a frying pan and whipped him with a jump rope. Stablemaster Michinoku was then accused of having covered these facts of violence by contributing directly to the fact that the aggressor can remain within the stable in a first time, then, in a second time, to the fact that the aggressor can retire with dignity and without any charges brought against him. Hanakago-oyakata, the director of the Compliance Department, is also implicated for having let the aggressor go unpunished, despite having been informed late and by the victim.

In February 2026 the Sumo Association was investigating a report that Isegahama (the 73rd yokozuna Terunofuji) physically assaulted Isegahama stable wrestler and former Miyagino stable member Hakunofuji.

== Harassment claims and failed properly paid overtime ==
In October 2023 it was revealed that several employees of the Japan Sumo Association had lodged complaints with the Board of Directors about the supervision of certain non-elder managers. After an investigation, it was revealed that the administrative affairs chief and the head of the office in charge of accounting were responsible for numerous irregularities dating back to 2017 concerning the payment of overtime pay for an estimated amount of 100 million yen (~$667,870/€637,712). Having initially sought to resolve the problem internally in August, the Association received twelve formal complaints from staff who were dissatisfied with the way the matter was being handled. At the same time, it was also reported that the same two managers had unilaterally reduced the salaries of certain employees, restricted access to the computer server and asked intrusive questions to women during recruitment interviews about their pregnancy and childbirth plans. Finally, it was also confirmed that both men had verbally abused employees. In response to these actions, the Sumo Association decided to suspend its administrative affairs chief for one month, and demote the head of the office in charge of accounting by one rank in the Association hierarchy.

== Health effects ==
The sumo lifestyle has negative health effects which become apparent later in life. Sumo wrestlers have a life expectancy between 60 and 65, more than 20 years shorter than the average Japanese male, as the diet and sport take a toll on the wrestler's body. Many develop type 2 diabetes or high blood pressure, and they are prone to heart attacks due to the enormous amount of body mass and fat that they accumulate. The excessive intake of alcohol can lead to liver problems and the stress on their joints due to their excess weight can cause arthritis. Recently, the standards of weight gain are becoming less strict, in an effort to improve the overall health of the wrestlers.

== Women and sumo ==
Professional sumo excludes women from competition and ceremonies. Women are not allowed to enter or touch the sumo wrestling ring (dohyō), a tradition stemming from Shinto beliefs that women are "impure" because of menstrual blood.

The female Governor of Osaka from 2000–2008, Fusae Ohta, when called upon to present the Governor's Prize to the champion of the annual Osaka tournament, was required to do so on the walkway beside the ring or send a male representative in her place. She repeatedly challenged the JSA's policy by requesting to be allowed to fulfill her traditional role as Governor. Her requests were repeatedly rejected until the end of her five-year term.

In April 2018, during a non-tournament sumo event in Kyoto Prefecture, two women rushed to the aid of the mayor of Maizuru when he collapsed in the middle of the dohyō. While the women were attempting to provide emergency treatment, a referee repeatedly asked them to leave the ring. The chairman of the Sumo Association later apologized for what he called an inappropriate response, saying that he greatly appreciated the women's efforts.

The view of those who criticize this continuing "men-only" policy is that it is discriminatory and oppressive. In general, women in the sumo world are only expected to be supportive wives of the wrestlers, and, in the case that their husband has become a stablemaster, a surrogate mother for all of his trainee wrestlers. The view of the JSA is that this is a tradition that has been firmly maintained through the centuries, so it would be a dishonor to all of their ancestors to change it.

This was not always the case. Starting as early as the 18th century a form of female sumo (女相撲, onnazumo) was performed in some areas of Japan. In the cities it was more of a spectacle often associated with brothels. However, in some areas of Japan female sumo had a serious role in certain Shinto rituals. In later years, there were limited tours of female sumo that lasted for a time. However, female sumo is not considered to be authentic by most Japanese and is now prohibited from taking place beyond amateur settings.

In January 2026, Sanae Takaichi, the first female Prime Minister of Japan, said she respected sumo traditions regarding women and would not enter the dohyō to give the Prime Minister's Cup to the winner of the top division at the grand sumo tournament. She decided to have special adviser Takahiro Inoue present the trophy on her behalf.

== See also ==
- Sumo
- 2011 in sumo
