= Sumo Museum =

Museum in Tokyo, Japan

Sumo Museum 相撲博物館
- Sumou Hakubutsukan
- Established: September 1954
- Location: Ryōgoku Kokugikan
- Coordinates: 35.69694°N 139.79338°E
- Type: History of Sumo
- Collections: Kesho-mawashi; Tachi; Woodblock prints Kimono and Yukata; Emakimono; Various archives (banzuke, photographs ...)
- Collection size: ~30 to 40 thousand pieces
- Founder: Count Tadamasa Sakai
- Executive director: Hakkaku Nobuyoshi (acting director)
- Owner: Japan Sumo Association
- Public transit access: JR East/Toei Subway: Chūō-Sōbu Line and Oedo Line at Ryogoku
- Website: (in English) https://www.sumo.or.jp/EnSumoMuseum/ (In Japanese) https://www.sumo.or.jp/KokugikanSumoMuseum/index

The Sumo Museum (Japanese: 相撲博物館, Hepburn: Sumō hakubutsukan) is an institution located in the Ryōgoku Kokugikan arena in Sumida, Tokyo. The museum is managed by the Japan Sumo Association.

The museum was opened in September 1954 when the Kuramae Kokugikan was completed. Its collection were based on materials collected over many years by Tadamasa Sakai, a well known sumo fan and first director of the museum. Its missions are to prevent the loss of materials related to sumo by collecting them and displaying them in the premises of the museum. In January 1985, when the Ryōgoku Kokugikan opened, it moved to its present location.

== History ==
The museum was based on the private collections accumulated by Sakai Tadamasa, a Japanese politician nicknamed Lord of sumo (相撲の殿様), who became the first director of the museum. Since then, thanks to donation from individuals and institutionalized collection, the Museum gathered around 30 000 pieces, half of them still being inherited from Sakai's collection. When the association was established in 1925, the act of endowment stipulated that the Association had to maintain a library to register records as one of its activities. When the Association became a Public Interest Incorporated Foundation, the maintenance of a museum was stipulated in the statutes of the Association. During the same year, 2014, the Museum celebrated its 60 years of existence by organizing a special exhibition.

In January 2020, the Sumo Museum closed its door in the process of a renovation plan and in prevision of the 35th anniversary of the Ryōgoku Kokugikan.

== Missions ==
The museum collects materials related to sumo (such as woodblock prints, banzuke and keshō-mawashi) and display them to the public. It also functions as a research center to study and examine the history of sumo and holds public conferences (called "Master talk event") where former wrestlers reflects on their career and answer questions from fans. Curators also publish a bulletin called the Sumo Museum Bulletin (相撲博物館紀要) since 2002, to publish the results of their research. The museum is a small institution (150 m^{2}), with only one exhibition room and four curators to provide visits and organization.

Since the museum is located at the far end of the right side of the Kokugikan, it is not uncommon for it to be relatively uncrowded, and some regular visitors to the arena have never been there. The museum does not intend its publications for the exclusive use of the public, and a number of wrestlers, such as the former Arawashi, come to consult the audiovisual archives to perfect their fighting style.

== Exhibitions ==
Due to its size, the museum does not have a permanent exhibition. Before the COVID-19, the museum used to organize six exhibitions a year. Since then, new exhibitions are organized three times a year, in particular to extend the exhibition period and increase the number of visitors per exhibition. The exhibition schedule is typically changed everytime a yokozuna retires, so an exhibition dedicated to the wrestler could take place. Between 2003 and 2022, 109 exhibitions took place in the museum.

Admission to the museum is usually free, but during Tokyo tournaments, a spectator ticket is required.

== Sumo Museum directors ==
| Name (Note: Directors who were former wrestlers use their personal names because they hold the position after their final retirement.) | Year(s) | Notes |
|---|---|---|
| Tadamasa Sakai † | 1954-1968 | First Chairman of the Yokozuna Deliberation Committee; First Director of the Sumo Museum. |
| Tsuruzo Ishii † | 1969-1973 | Member of the Yokozuna Deliberation Committee; Appointed director of the Sumo Museum in 1969 until his death. |
| Kuniichi Ichikawa † | 1976-1987 | Served as the director of the Sumo Museum as a part-time member of the Japan Sumo Association after his retirement in 1976. |
| Katsuji Hanada † | 1993-1996 | Became director of the Sumo Museum after the end of his term as chairman of the Association. |
| Kōki Naya † | 2005-2008 | Assumed the position of director of the Sumo Museum after his retirement, which had been vacant for almost nine years. Until his appointment the position was taken by the Association's board directors as acting directors. |
| Gorō Ishiyama | 2013-2023 | Assumed the position of director of the Sumo Museum after his retirement. He stood down after 10 years' service when he reached the age of 75. The interim management is held by the Japan Sumo Association chairman Hakkaku Nobuyoshi. |

== Sumo Museum gallery ==
Sumo Museum (1954-current)
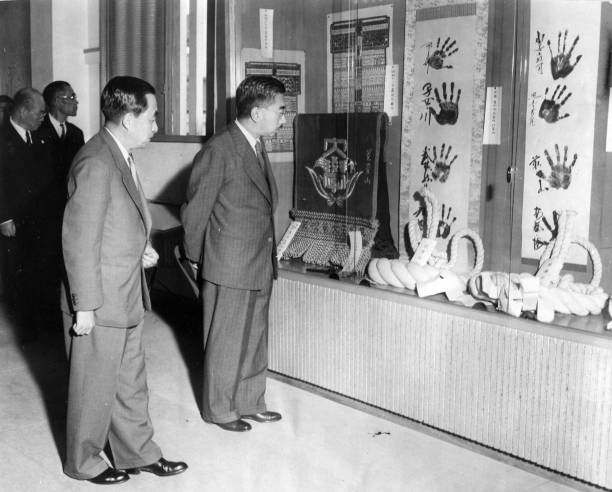
Emperor Shōwa, accompanied by Sakai Tadamasa (left), visiting the Sumo Museum in the Kuramae Kokugikan (May 1955)

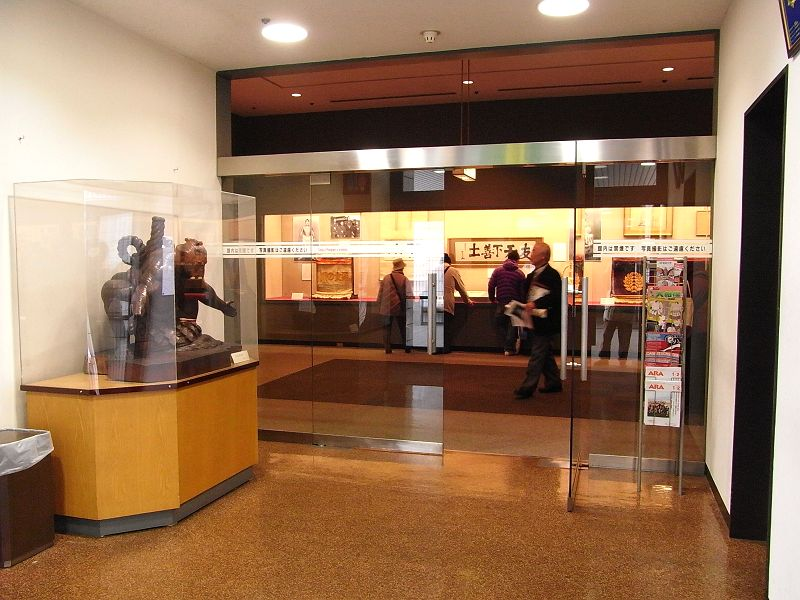
The entrance of the Sumo Museum in the Ryōgoku Kokugikan

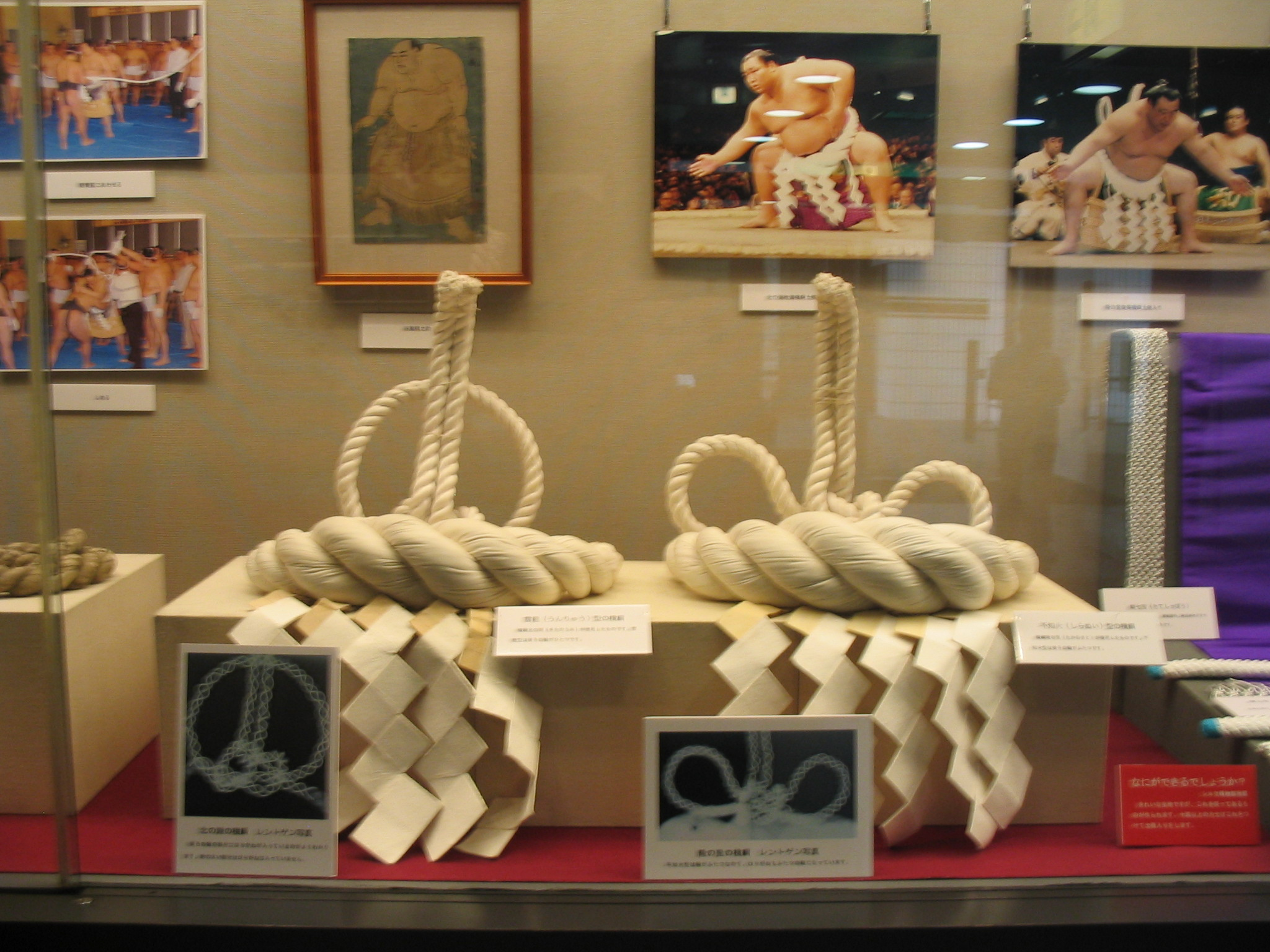
Yokozuna exhibition featuring Kitanoumi and Takanosato tsuna belts

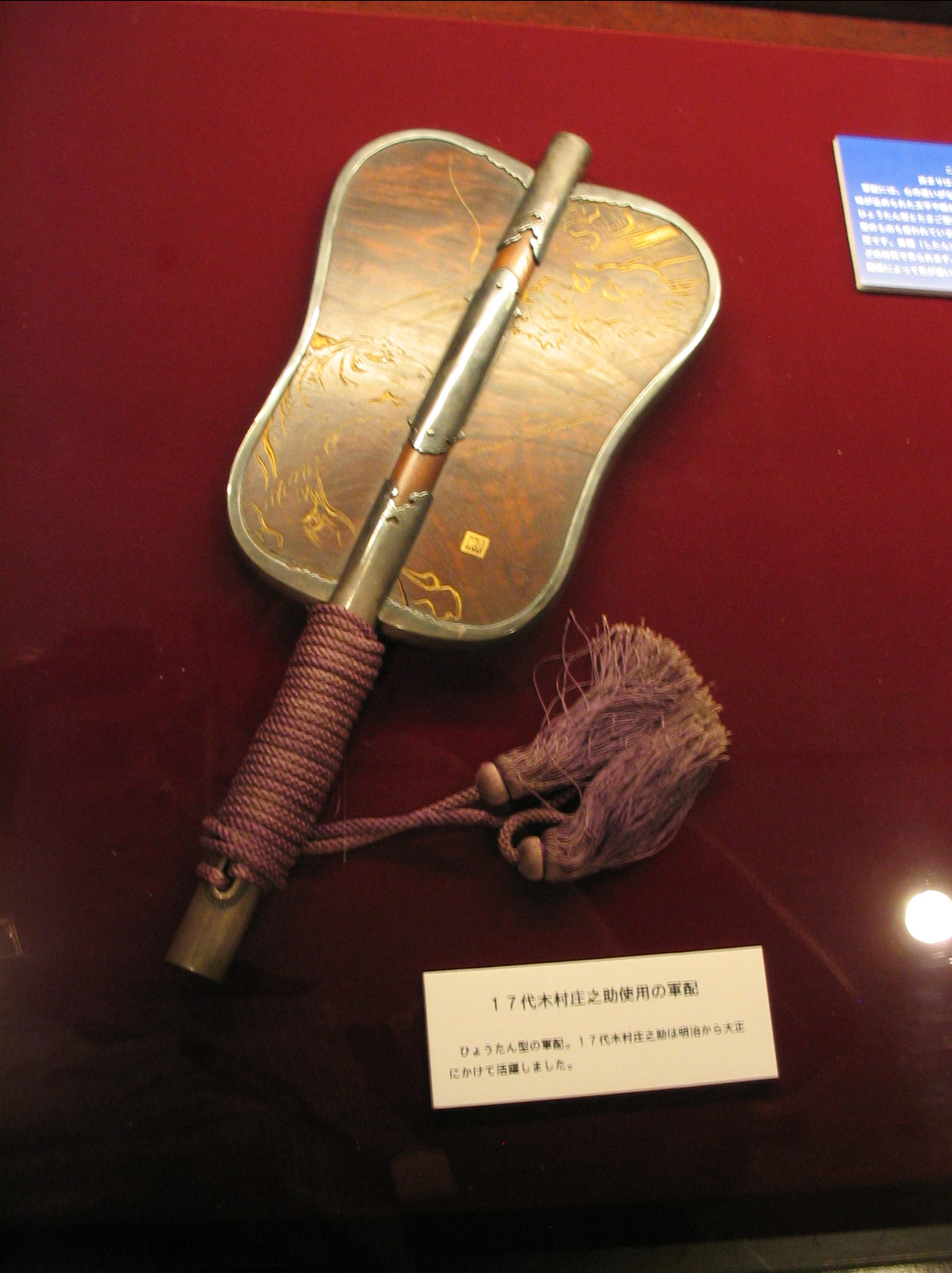
The gunbai of a gyōji exhibited in the Sumo Museum

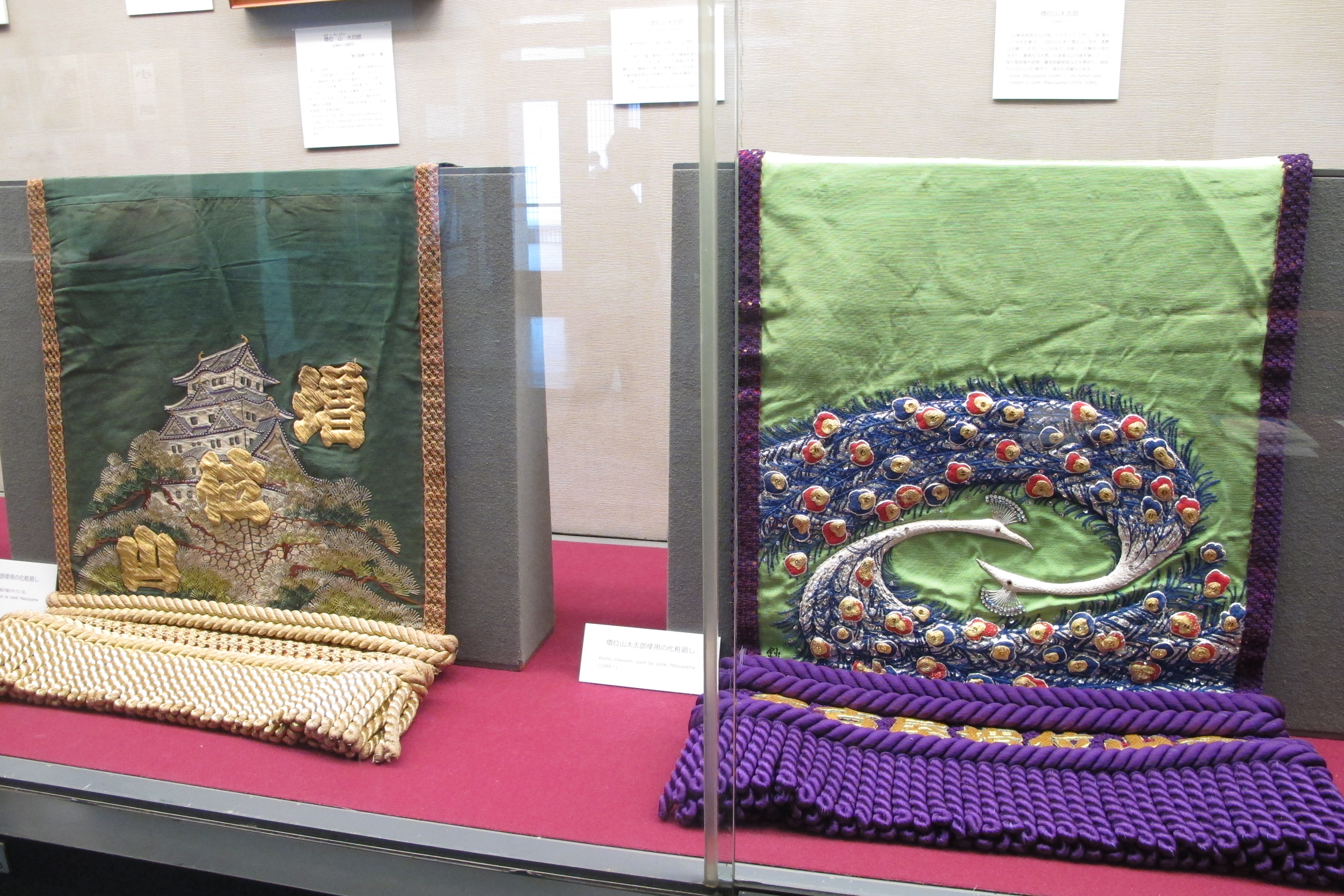
Keshō-mawashi are often exhibited in the Sumo Museum.

== See also ==
- Professional sumo
- Japan Sumo Association
- List of museums in Tokyo
