= Operations director =

Job title

The role of operations director generally encompasses the oversight of operational aspects of company strategy with responsibilities to ensure operation information is supplied to the chief executive and the board of directors as well as external parties.

== Description ==
The role of operations director can vary according to the size of a company, and at some companies many even encompass some or all the functions of a chief operating officer.

The Institute of Directors of the United Kingdom defines the role as overseeing "all operational aspects of company strategy" and "responsible for the flow of operations information to the chief executive, the board and, where necessary, external parties such as investors or financial institutions". The United Kingdom arm of recruitment agency Monster.com suggests a typical definition of the role is "Directs and coordinates the internal structure of an organisation based on company policies, goals, and objectives to ensure an efficient working environment and that deadlines are met consistently.".

== See also ==
- Corporate titles
- Outline of management
