= Kuramae Kokugikan =

Building in Taito-ku, Tokyo, Japan

Kuramae Kokugikan 蔵前国技館
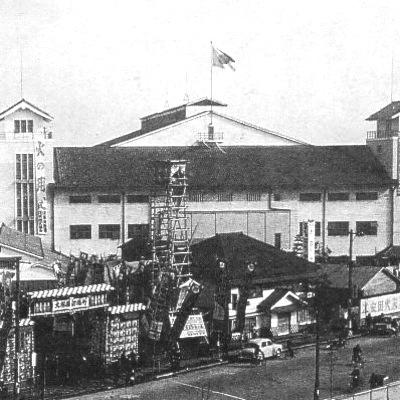
- Kuramae Kokugikan, 1950
- Interactive map of Kuramae Kokugikan 蔵前国技館
- Full name: Kuramae Kokugikan Sumo Arena
- Address: Taitō; Tokyo; Japan
- Location: 2-1-1 Kuramae
- Coordinates: 35.702333°N 139.791556°E
- Owner: Japan Sumo Association
- Type: Sumo tournament venues
- Acreage: 17,769 m^{2} (191,260 sq ft)

Construction
- Groundbreaking: October 23, 1949
- Built: 1949
- Opened: September, 1954
- Closed: September, 1984
- Builder: Obayashi Corporation

Kuramae Kokugikan (Japanese: 蔵前国技館, Hepburn: Kuramae Kokugi-kan) was a building situated in the Kuramae neighborhood of Taitō, Tokyo which was built by the Japan Sumo Association and opened in 1954. Its construction was decided to replace the old bomb-damaged Ryōgoku Kokugikan. It closed its doors in 1984. The building was torn down and sporting events were transferred to the second Ryōgoku Kokugikan. The place is now the site of the Tokyo Metropolitan Government Bureau of Sewage.

== History ==
The Sumo Association has owned the site of the former Tokyo Technical High School at the base of Kuramae Bridge since before World War II. The construction plan for the new Kokugikan was underway since around 1940 but was suspended due to the war. After the war, the old Kokugikan was occupied by the allied forces enforcing the budo ban, forcing the Japan Sumo Association to hold tournaments and Sumo venues in shrines and baseball stadiums. Due to resource shortages after the war, the beginnings of the arena were built using the scraps from the demolition of the naval hangar of Atsugi. The target capacity was 11,000 spectators. From 1950 to 1953, main tournaments were held at the Kuramae Kokugikan, which was still under construction.

Kuramae Kokugikan was officially completed in September 1954. To protect and preserve the rich historical heritage of Sumo, a Sumo Museum was created in the premises of the building. In September 1952, the four traditional pillars (shihon-bashira) were replaced by the current tsuriyane (suspended ceiling), as the matches began to be broadcast. From 1953 to 1971, the Kuramae Kokugikan underwent a series of renovations, including electric boards to announce the bout results, air conditioning and heating. Originally built using recycled materials, there had been some debate within the Japan Sumo Association as to whether the arena should be fully renovated or partially renovated, or whether a new Kokugikan should be built. In 1982, it was decided a new arena would be built and the Kuramae Kokugikan closed in 1984.

=== Sumo ===
At the opening ceremony (September 18, 1954), both yokozuna Chiyonoyama and Kagamisato performed a very rare sandangamae ceremony. In January 1971, yokozuna Tamanoumi and Kitanofuji, performed the same ceremony to commemorate the completion of the renovations. In May 1955, Emperor Shōwa came to his first tenran-zumō at the arena, 10 years after the end of the war, to support the sport. Until then, sumo bouts for the emperor were held at the imperial palace.

=== Wrestling ===
The Kuramae Kokugikan is also famous for holding sold-out professional wrestling venues, including Tokyo Pro, National Wrestling Alliance (NWA) and Japan Pro Wrestling Alliance (JWA) cards and the first women's professional wrestling tournament. The arena also saw the birth of Antonio Inoki as a star.

=== Other uses ===
The arena also held different tournaments for a large variety of sports, including boxing, judo and kendo. It was used as the venue for the first All Japan Kendo Championships (1953) and the first World Judo Championships (1956). The Kuramae Kokugikan is seen in the 1967 film You Only Live Twice.

== Gallery ==
Kuramae Kokugikan (1954-1984).
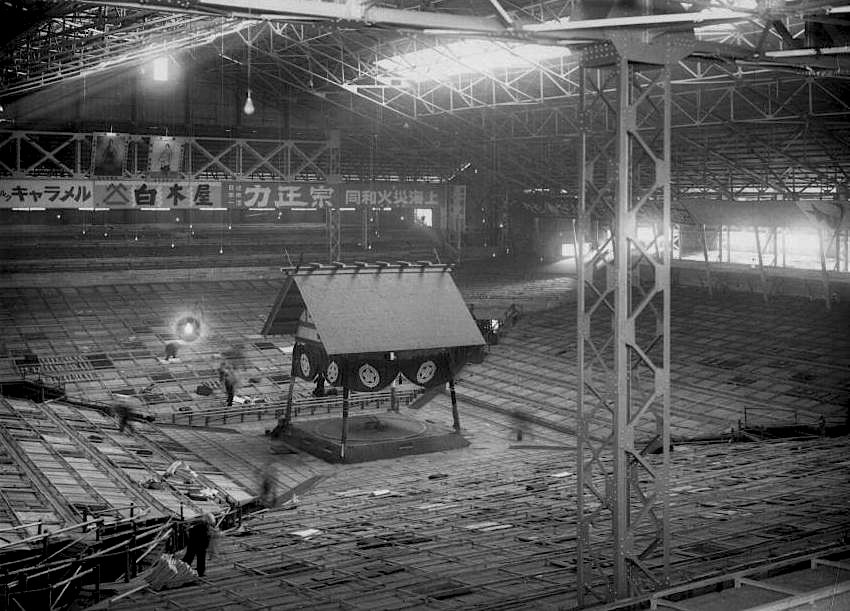
The inside of the building (1949).

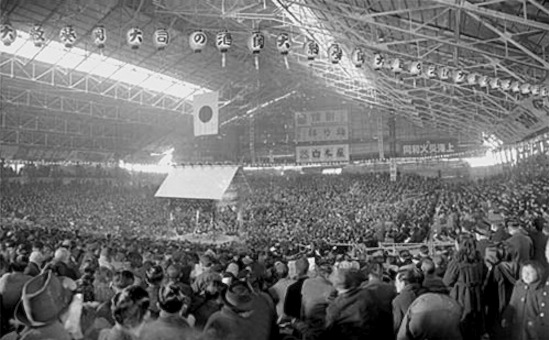
Inside of the building during a tournament (1950).

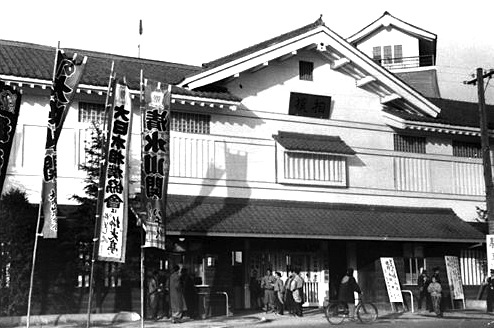
The main entrance of the building (1954)

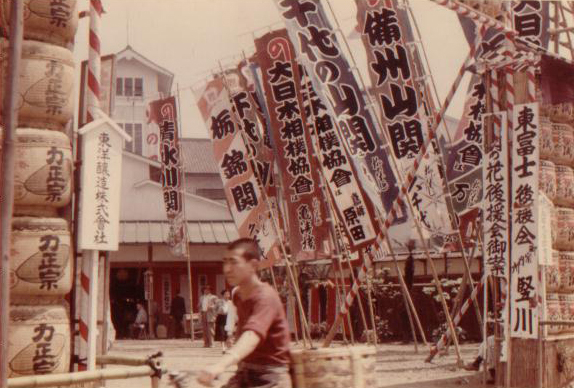
Secondary entrance during a tournament (1954), note the nobori (right) and traditional sake barrels (left).

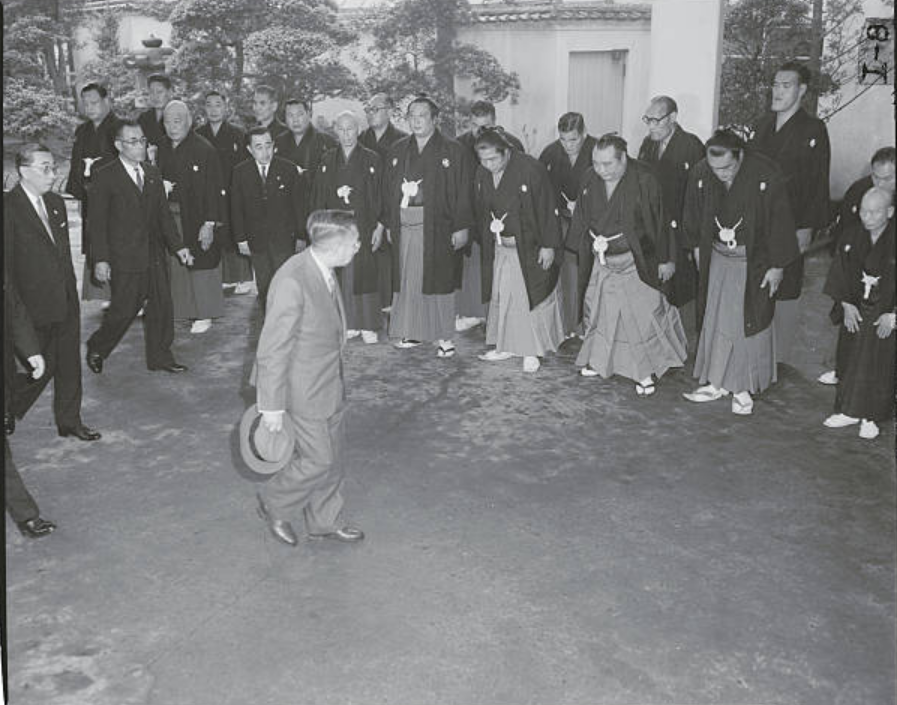
Emperor Shōwa greeted by officials and wrestlers in 1956.

== Notes ==
1.Ban on martial arts gatherings enforced from 1945 to 1950.
