= Sports Nippon =

Japanese daily sports newspaper

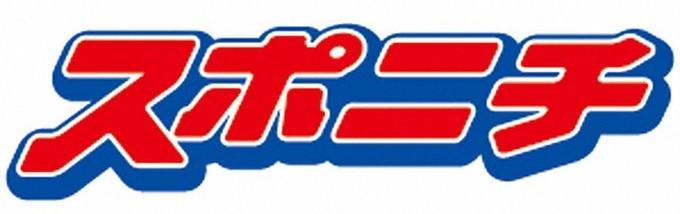

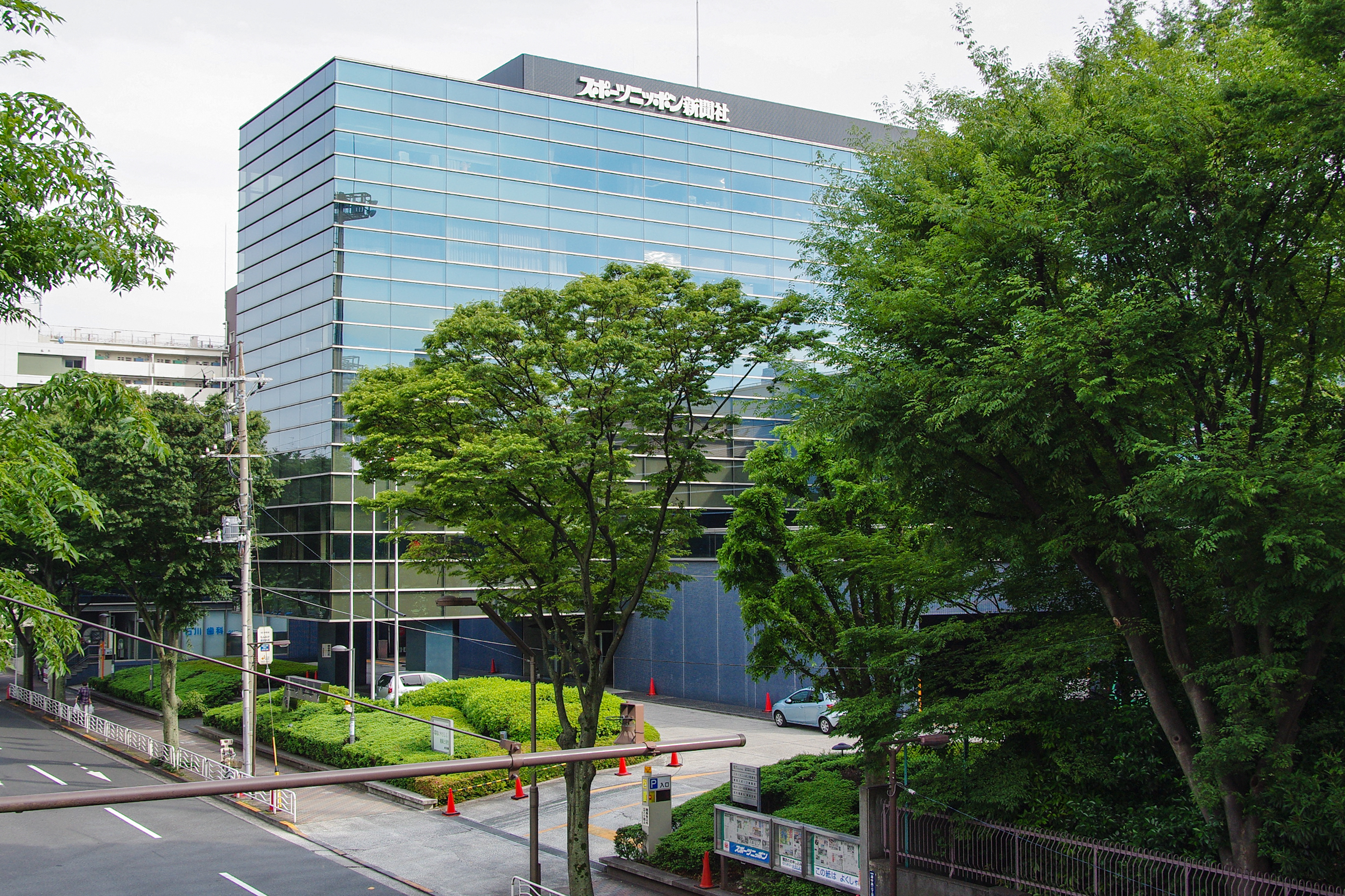
- S-T Building, the headquarters of Sports Nippon Newspapers Company, Tonichi Printing Company and Tokyo Sports Press Company, in Tokyo
- Type: Daily newspaper
- Format: Print, online
- Owner: Sports Nippon Newspapers Company
- Founded: 1948
- Language: Japanese
- Website: https://www.sponichi.co.jp/

Sports Nippon (スポーツニッポン, Supōtsu Nippon), also known as Sponichi (スポニチ, Suponichi), is the first Japanese daily sports newspaper, having been founded in 1948. In a 1997 report it was called one of the "Big Three" sports papers in Japan, out of a field of 17 sports dailies.

It is an affiliate newspaper of the Mainichi Shimbun.

== See also ==
- Masters GC Ladies
- Miss Nippon
- Toto Japan Classic
