= Hansoku =

A hansoku or hansoku-make is a disqualifying penalty in a number of martial arts.

== See also ==
- Kinjite (disqualifying fouls) in Sumo
- Penalties in Judo
- Hansoku-mate is one of the penalties in various styles of Karate
