= Kinjite =

Sumo wrestling fouls

Kinjite (禁じ手 or 禁手; literally forbidden hand) are various fouls that a sumo wrestler might commit that will cause him to lose the bout. They are:

- Striking the opponent with a closed fist.
- Grabbing the opponent's hair.
- Jabbing at the opponent's eyes or solar plexus.
- Simultaneously striking both of the opponent's ears with the palms.
- Grabbing or pulling the opponent's groin.
- Grabbing the opponent's throat.
- Kicking at the opponent's chest or waist.
- Bending back one or more of the opponent's fingers.

Any of these is grounds for immediate disqualification (hansoku) owing to the potential for long-lasting harm to the wrestler involved. They are exceedingly rare and unlikely to be seen in the higher divisions of sumo, especially by the sekitori wrestlers. Additionally, if a wrestler's mawashi becomes undone, they will be similarly disqualified.

Perhaps the most common kinjite committed is the grabbing of the opponent's hair. Since it is tied up in a form of chonmage one's hand can become inadvertently tangled in it during a bout. Itai pulled his opponent's hair on two consecutive days when ranked in the jūryō division in May 1980. Other rikishi to have been disqualified in this way include ōzeki Daikirin and yokozuna Asashōryū in July 2003, ōzeki Tochinoshin in September 2019 and Terunofuji in May 2021.

Whilst grabbing the throat is not allowed, pushing the opponent backwards with an open hand against the throat (called a nodowa) is permitted, and is actually quite common.

In addition, there are moves that are permitted to professional rikishi and forbidden to more junior (school level) wrestlers. One such move is harite — slapping the opponent's face with an open hand.

Kinjite also refers to an illegal move in shogi.

== See also ==
- Glossary of sumo terms
