= Sakura Azumao =

- 佐久良東雄
- Born: Iijima Yukie; May 13, 1811; Ishioka, Ibaraki, Japan
- Died: August 13, 1860 (aged 49); Edo, Japan

Sakura Azumao (佐久良東雄, May 13, 1811- August 13, 1860) was a kokugaku scholar and poet during Bakumatsu period Japan. He is also described as a nationalist philosopher. Azumao was a noted proponent of the sonnō jōi movement to overthrow the Tokugawa shogunate and to expel foreigners from Japan. He went by many pseudonyms during his career, including the pen-name of Koen, and given names of Yukie, Hiroshi, Shizuma and Takeo in addition to Azumao. His poetry was highly praised in the pre-war period for its patriotic overtones.

== Biography ==
=== Early years as a Buddhist priest ===
Sakura Azumao was born as the eldest son of a country samurai name Iijima Heizo in what is now Ishioka, Ibaraki, and his childhood name was Kichibe. His family were hereditary headmen of Urasu Village. At the age of nine, we was sent to serve as a Buddhist acolyte at the temple of Kannon-ji, and was given the nickname of "Man'yō-hoshi" after his advent study of the Man'yōshū poetry anthology. He was tonsured as a priest at the age of 15, taking the name of Koshun. From an early age he exhibited an interest in politics, persuading local peasants to stop an uprising against taxation and making a plea to the local governor on their behalf when he was 17. He was sent for further training at the temple of Hase-dera in Nara, and returned as head priest of Kannon-ji in 1832. In 1835, he was transferred to become head priest of the temple of Zenno-ji in what is now Tsuchiura. Since his 20s, Sakura had befriended local Confucian scholars of Kasama Domain and Tsuchiura Domain, forming a literary coterie to study Japanese classical literature, and taking the name of "Azumao". This coterie was also strongly influenced by the nativist Mitogaku political philosophy. Recognized for his literary erudition and scholarship, he received an offer of employment from Mito Domain, but declined.

=== Return to secular life ===
In 1842, Sakura resigned his post as head priest of Zenno-ji and relocated to Higashi Nihonbashi in Edo. He became a disciple of Hirata Atsutane, the famed kokugaku scholar. In June 1843 he renounced his Buddhist vows, visiting Kashima Jingu and donating a thousand cherry trees as a pledge of his dedication towards the restoration of the Emperor to his rightful place in the political hierarchy. Around this time, he changed his surname from Iijima to Sakura. He married a daughter of a doctor of Mito Domain, and eventually had two sons and two daughters. He was friend of Watanabe Kazan while in Edo. However, he spent much time traveling around the country to promote the sonnō portion of the sonnō jōi philosophy, visiting Kyoto in 1845 and settling in what is now Sakai to lecture on poetry. His works were noted for their nationalistic overtones. There are poems that focused on elevating filial piety to nationalism by tracing the relationship of family codes and teachings with service to the Imperial Household and the country.

Azumao later served as kannushi of the Shinto shrine of Zama Jinja in Osaka, and opened a Shintoism school to study Emperor-centered historiography. Sometime in 1849, he became involved in the publication Hirata Atsutane's works, which were targets of shogunal ban for their criticism of the Buddhist scripture. When the Ibukinoya discovered his activities, Azumao was forced to leave Osaka in 1851.

In 1854, he moved back to Kyoto, befriending members of the kuge aristocracy and receiving a minor title as a master of Shinto rituals. He subsequently moved back to Osaka, where he provided support to many of the Mito ronin who were fugitives from the Shogunate's police for their role in the Sakuradamon Incident, in which the tairō Ii Naosuke was assassinated. However, he was arrested together with two of the ronin in March 1860 and was transferred to a prison in Edo, where he died of disease in August of the same year. Later, a rumor arose that he had actually died of a hunger strike, but the truth is unknown.

After his death, he was initially buried at the criminal's cemetery at the temple of Ekō-in in Ryōgoku; however, after the Meiji restoration, he was reburied at Yuhigaoka, Tennoji in Osaka by the Mito Tokugawa clan in 1869. This site later became an industrial exhibition site, so his grave was relocated to the Higashinari District public cemetery in 1899, and finally to Zenno-ji in Ibaraki where he had once served as head priest.

== Sakura Azumao Former Residence ==
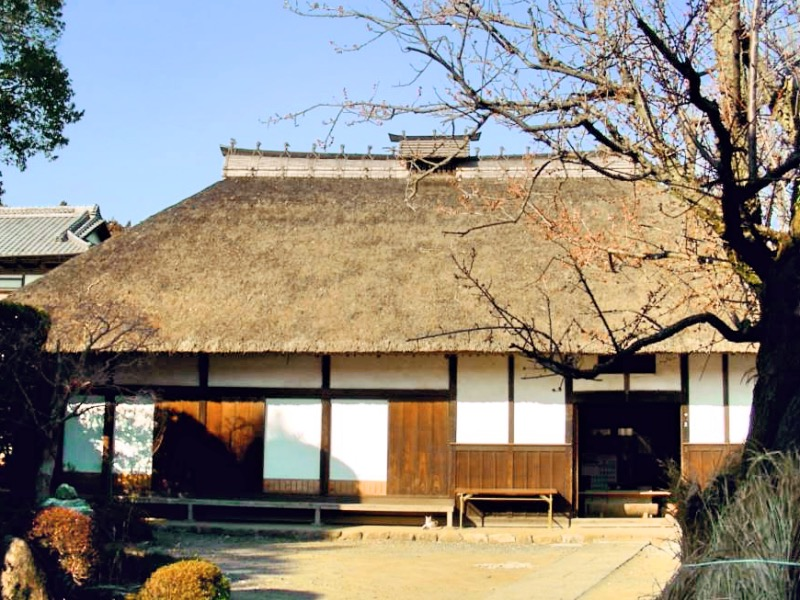

The Sakura Azumao Former Residence (佐久良東雄旧宅, Sakura Azumao kyū-taku) is the house in Ishioka, Chiba where he spent his childhood. The building has a Nagayamon-style gate in front, and a thatch-roof main building with a dirt floor and a kura warehouse surrounded by hedges and a bamboo grove. It is not clear when the building was completed, but from the style of construction and floor plan, it is estimated that the building was completed between 1751 and 1788, well before Sakura Azumao was born. The house is a 15-minute walk from Ishioka Station on the JR East Jōban Line. It was proclaimed a National Historic Site in 1944.
