= Nezumi Kozō =

Japanese thief (c.1797–1831)

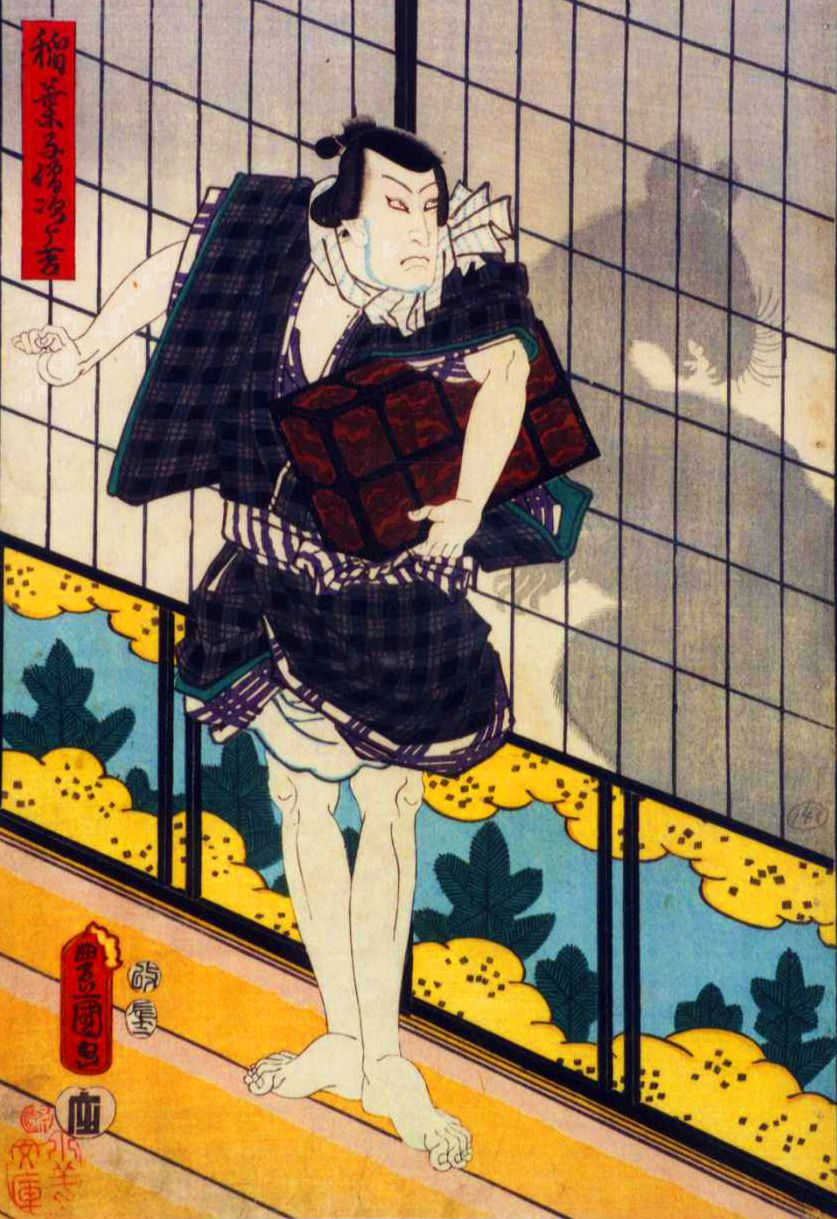
Ichikawa Kodanji IV (四代目市川小團次) as Nezumi Kozō. New Year day, 4th year of Ansei (February, 1857) at the first play at Yedo Ichimura-za, Nezumi komon haruno shingata (鼠小紋東君新形), drawn by Utagawa Toyokuni III

Nezumi Kozō (鼠小僧; Japanese pronunciation: [ne.(d)zɯ.mʲi ko.(d)zoꜜː]) is the nickname of Nakamura Jirokichi (仲村次郎吉; c. 1797–1831), a Japanese thief and folk hero who lived in Edo (present-day Tokyo) during the Edo period.

His exploits have been commemorated in kabuki theatre, folk songs, jidaigeki, and modern pop culture.

== Capture and tattoo ==
In 1822, he was caught and tattooed, and banished from Edo. On August 8, 1831, he was captured again, and confessed to the burglary of over 100 samurai estates and the impressive theft of over 30,000 ryō throughout his 15-year career. He was tied to a horse and paraded in public before being beheaded at the Suzugamori execution grounds. His head was then publicly displayed on a stake. He was buried at Ekō-in located in the Ryōgoku section of Tokyo. So many pilgrims have chipped away pieces of his tombstone for charms that his headstone has had to have been replaced a number of times since his death.

== Background ==
At the time of the arrest, Jirokichi was found to have very little money. This, combined with the public humiliation he dealt out to the daimyō, resulted in the popular legend that he gave the money to the poor, turning the petty crook into a posthumous folk hero similar to Robin Hood. The fact that he died alone, serving his wives with divorce papers just prior to arrest in order to protect them from sharing in the punishment as the law decreed, further enhanced his stature.

== Nickname ==
Jirokichi's nickname Nezumi Kozō roughly means "Rat Kid".

The word nezumi means "rat" or "mouse" and kozō translates to "kid, brat". The term kozō is a somewhat pejorative word for any young male. (Note: A kozō can also mean 1. a young apprentice at a Buddhist temple, or 2. an errand-boy at a shop)

As pickpockets were often young boys and girls since the profession required nimble fingers, it has been suggested that Jirokichi was a well known pickpocket when he was younger. In actuality, even though the nickname containing the term kozō was frequently applied to pickpockets, there are many other instances where it became the epithet of other types of criminals. (Note: Shigematsu names Inaka Kozō、Inaba Kozō、Ichimatsu Kozō (市松小僧)、Aoi Kozō、and Nezumi Kozō who were burglars.)

== Media ==
- Nezumi, Edo wo hashiru: a Japanese television series relating the adventures of Nezumi Kozo, with Hideaki Takizawa in the main part.
- In the video game Persona 5, the main character is shown wearing a T-shirt referencing the year of his birth and there is a pop quiz question related to his execution.
- In an episode of Lupin III Part 2, Nezumi Kozō's fourth descendant, named Rat Boy Jirokichi IV, teams up with Goemon Ishikawa XIII to pull off a heist in the Sakuradamon Police Station.
- Nezumi Kozō appears in the video game Once Upon a Katamari in an Edo Period level. He tasks the player with stealing as many coins as possible using the katamari and giving them to him.

== See also ==
- Criminal punishment in Edo-period Japan
- Ishikawa Goemon
