= Ryōgoku Kokugikan =

Arena in Tokyo

Ryōgoku Kokugikan (Japanese: 両国国技館; lit. "Ryōgoku National Sports Hall"), also known as Ryōgoku Sumo Hall or Kokugikan Arena, refers to two different indoor sporting arenas located in Tokyo. The first Ryōgoku Kokugikan opened its doors in 1909 and was located on the premises of the Ekōin temple in Ryōgoku, Tokyo. Although no sumo bouts were held after 1945, following the capitulation of Japan and the requisition of the building by the occupying forces, the building itself remained active until 1983, being notably used by the Nihon University. The second Ryōgoku Kokugikan is currently located in the Yokoami neighborhood of Sumida next to the Edo-Tokyo Museum. It opened in 1985, following the closure of the Kuramae Kokugikan, and is still in use today.

== First Ryōgoku Kokugikan ==
Ryōgoku Kokugikan 両国国技館
- Daitetsusan (the big iron umbrella)
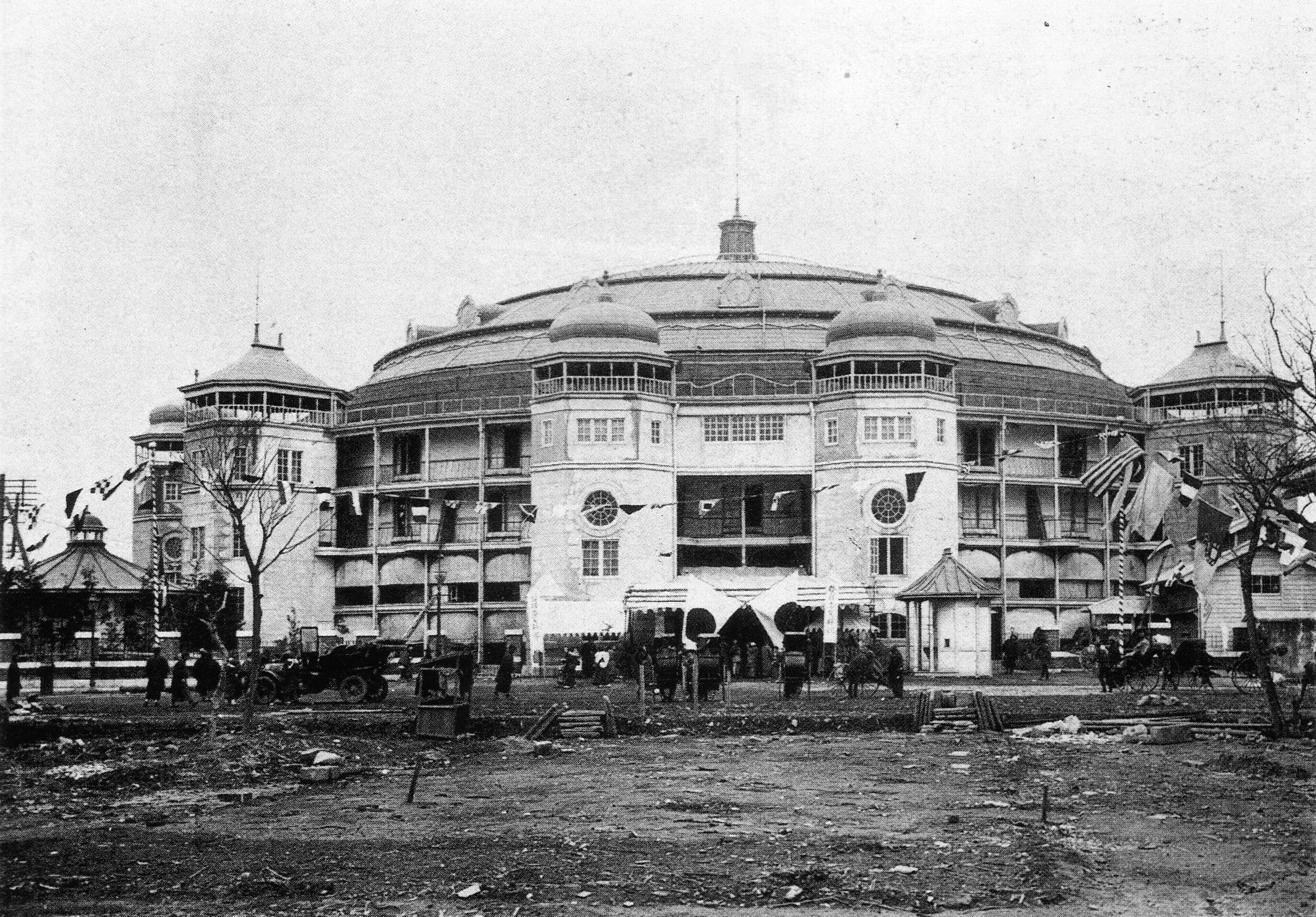
- Ryōgoku Kokugikan, 1909
- Interactive map of Ryōgoku Kokugikan 両国国技館
- Full name: Ryōgoku Kokugikan Sumo Arena
- Address: Sumida, Tokyo, Japan
- Location: 2 Chome-10-14 Ryogoku
- Coordinates: 35.69368°N 139.79247°E
- Owner: Japan Sumo Association then Nihon University
- Main venue: Capacity: 20,000
- Acreage: 4,959 m^{2} (land area) 2,995 m^{2} (stadium area)

Construction
- Groundbreaking: March, 1906
- Built: 1906–1909
- Opened: June 2, 1909
- Renovated: 1920, 1923, 1945
- Closed: September, 1946
- Demolished: 1983
- Cost: 280,000 yen
- Architects: Tatsuno Kingo, Kasai Manji

Website
- https://www.ryogoku-city.co.jp/

=== History ===
The growing popularity of Sumo during the Meiji period led to the building of the original Kokugikan in Ryōgoku. Until then, Sumo bouts were performed in temples precincts and depended on the weather. In March 1906, the 22nd Imperial Diet decided to build an indoor sumo facility within the precincts of the Ekōin temple in Ryōgoku. The task was given to two of the most predominant architects in Japan at the time, Tatsuno Kingo and Kasai Manji (mostly known for the Bank of Japan, the Hamadera Park Station or the Tokyo Station). Inspired by western architecture, the building is Japan's first dome-shaped steel framed building. Construction began in June 1906 and the arena was quickly nicknamed "big iron umbrella" (大鉄傘, Daitetsusan) because of the large roof resembling a huge umbrella. Although it was a Western-style building, the roof imitated the kondo (centerpiece) of Horyuji Temple. The opening ceremony was held on June 2, 1909.

Originally set to be called Shobukan (lit. Home of Martial Arts) by the founding committee chairman Itagaki Taisuke, the building took the name of Kokugikan (lit. National Sports Hall) thanks to another member of the committee, writer Suiin Emi.

The arena was thought to accommodate 13,000 people, including about 1,000 square seats. The inner diameter of the building was 62m, and the central height was 25m. In 1931, the Japan Sumo Association decided to replace the old Irimoya-zukuri style roof of the ring with a Shinmei-zukuri style roof.

The building of the Ryōgoku Kokugikan consecrated the evolution of Sumo from a Shinto ritual to a national sport.

=== Damages and requisition ===
The first Kokugikan suffered extensive damage during its years of service. In November 1917, during a series of big fires in Tokyo, the arena burned down due to an accidental fire resulting in its large roof collapsing. The Ryōgoku Kokugikan was destroyed for the first time and needed to be built from scratch. The total amount of damage amounted to about 1.2 million yen and the tournaments had to be held at the Yasukuni Shrine until the arena was rebuilt in January 1920, notably using zinc to fortify the roof.

Three years later, in September 1923, the Ryōgoku Kokugikan was destroyed in the Great Kantō earthquake and tournaments had to be held at the Butokuden lot in Nagoya.

In February 1944, the Kokugikan was requisitioned by the military and turned into a balloon bomb factory. The Summer tournament was therefore held at the Korakuen Stadium (sekitori) and Meiji Jingu Stadium (Makushita and below). In March 1945, an air raid over Tokyo damaged it and the surrounding sumo stables. After the war, the Kokugikan was occupied by the allies forces and the budo ban was enforced, preventing tournaments until November. As the arena was requisitioned by the allies, the Kokugikan undergone a new phase of restoration and was renamed Ryogoku Memorial Hall. The renovations were completed by September 1946 leaving the November 1945 tournament to a burnt-out Kokugikan. The November tournament of 1946 was the last tournament to occur in the arena.

=== Post sumo venues ===
Since then, the Kokugikan has been used for roller skating, professional boxing and professional wrestling. Japan's first public wrestling match was held at the Memorial Hall on September 30, 1951. It was also used as the venue for the All Japan Judo Championships in May 1951.

In 1958, the former Kokugikan (Ryōgoku, Sumida Ward) was purchased from the Japan Sumo Association by the Nihon University, to create a large auditorium that could hold unified ceremonies such as entrance ceremonies and graduation ceremonies throughout the university. The Memorial Hall was therefore renamed Nihon University Auditorium (日大講堂, Nihon Kōdō). During the Zenkyōtō the auditorium was used as a conference room for the protest rally.

Due to aging equipment, notably failing to meet fire protection regulations, the building was dismantled in 1983. After the demolition, the complex building facility "Ryogoku City Core" and other offices, residences, and restaurants were built. In the courtyard, the location of the dohyō of the former Kokugikan is indicated by a circle on the ground.

=== Gallery ===
Ryōgoku Kokugikan 1909–1983
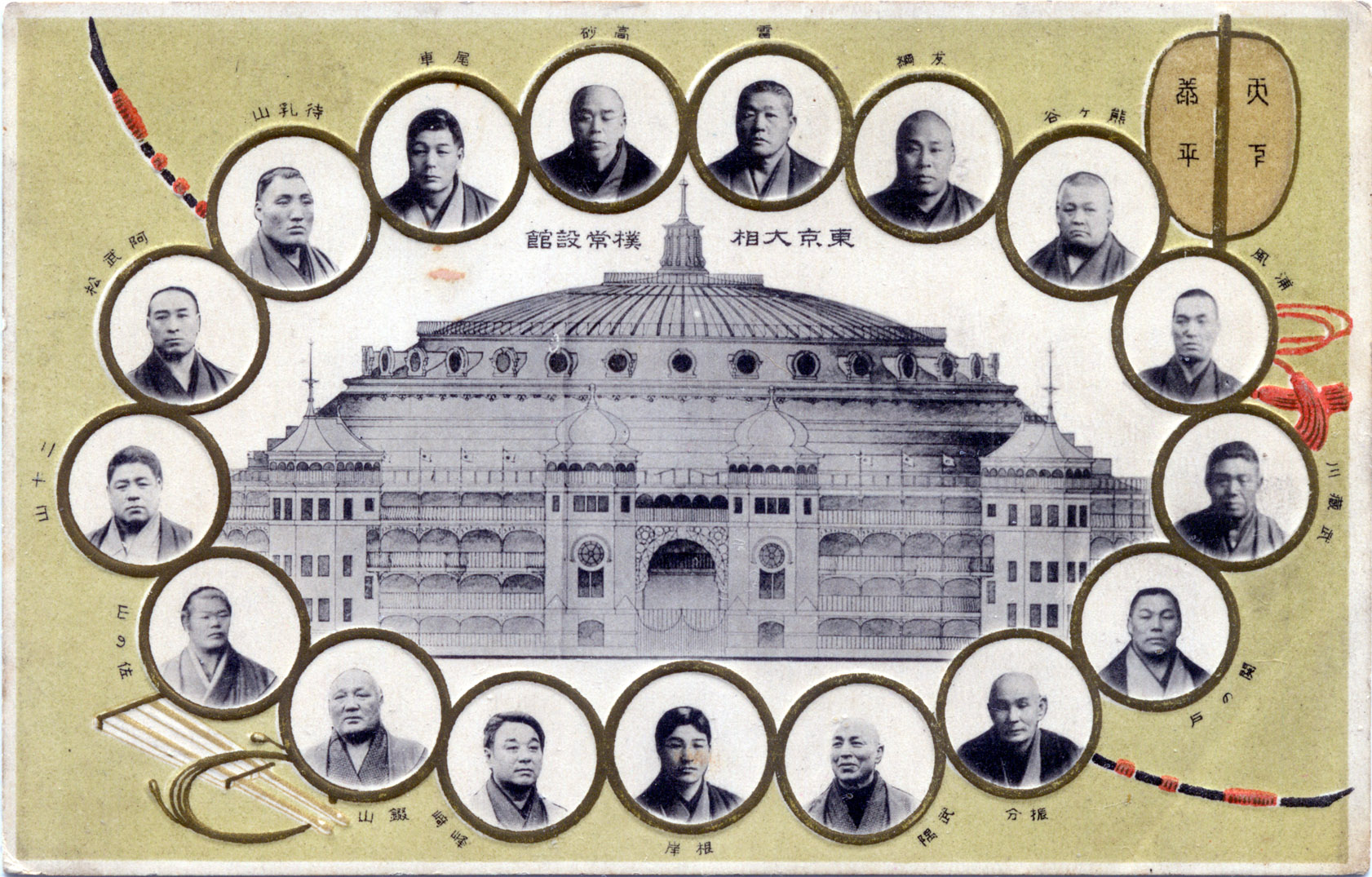
Kokugikan commemorative postcard in 1909 surrounded by stable masters.

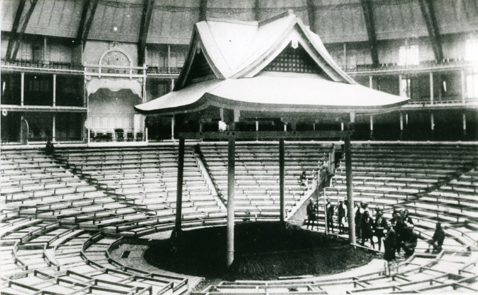
A view of the Kokugikan ring (1909), the suspended roof was of the Irimoya-zukuri style.

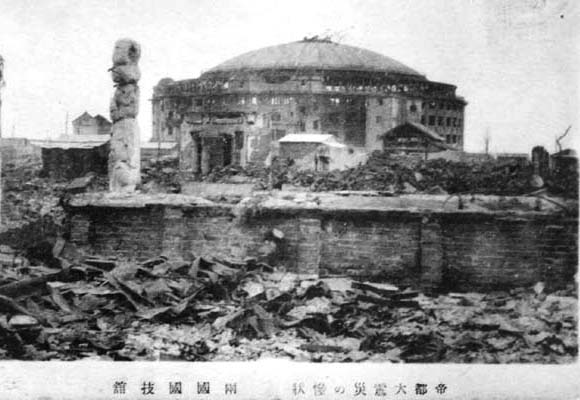
The Kokugikan after the Great Kanto Earthquake (1923).

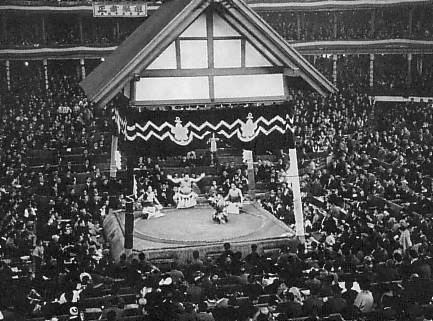
Inside of the arena (1936) during a yokozuna dohyo-iri. The roof is of Shinmei-zukuri style since 1931.

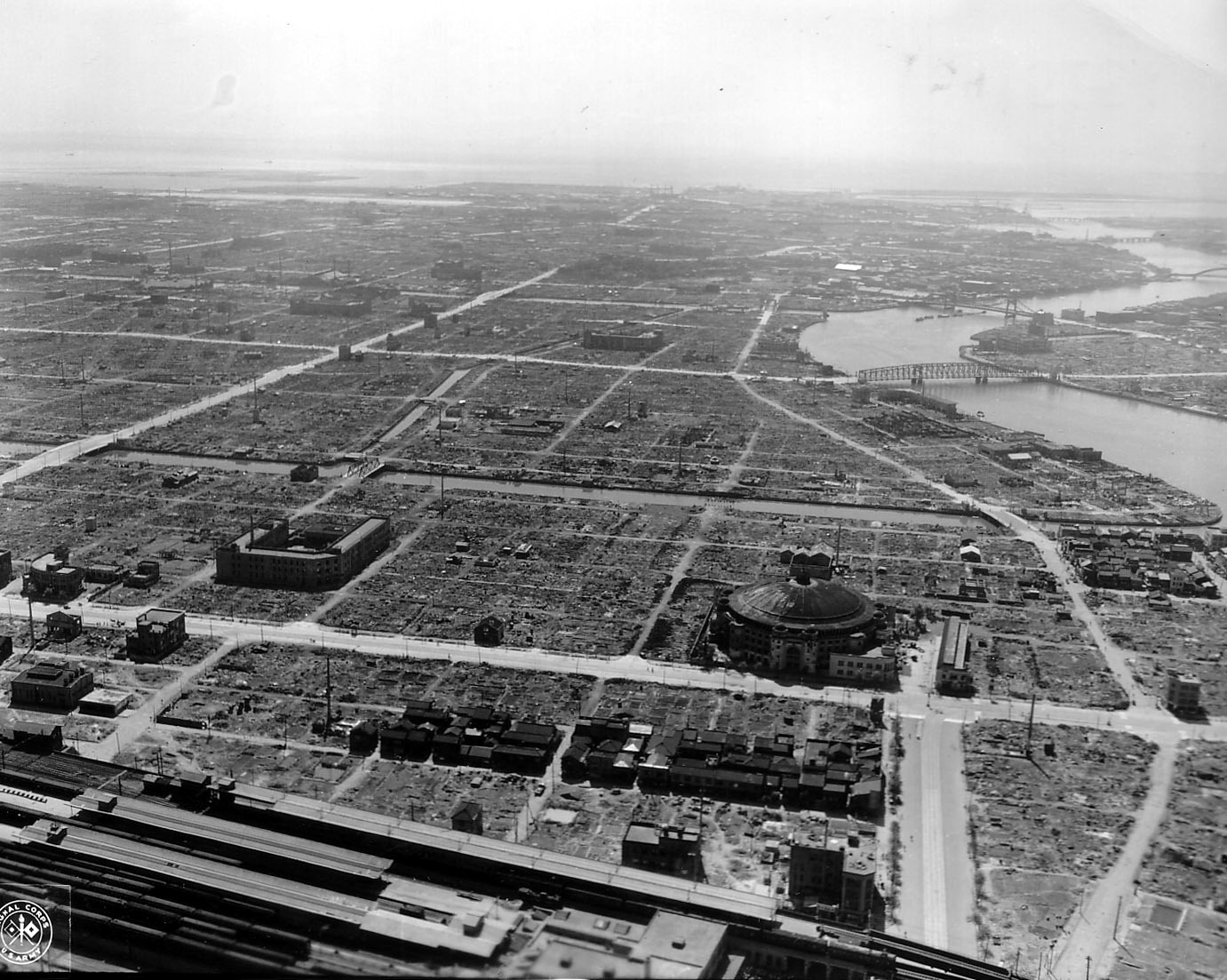
The Ryogoku neighborhood after the 1944 air raid. The Kokugikan is seen between the Ryōgoku Station and the Ryōgoku Bridge.

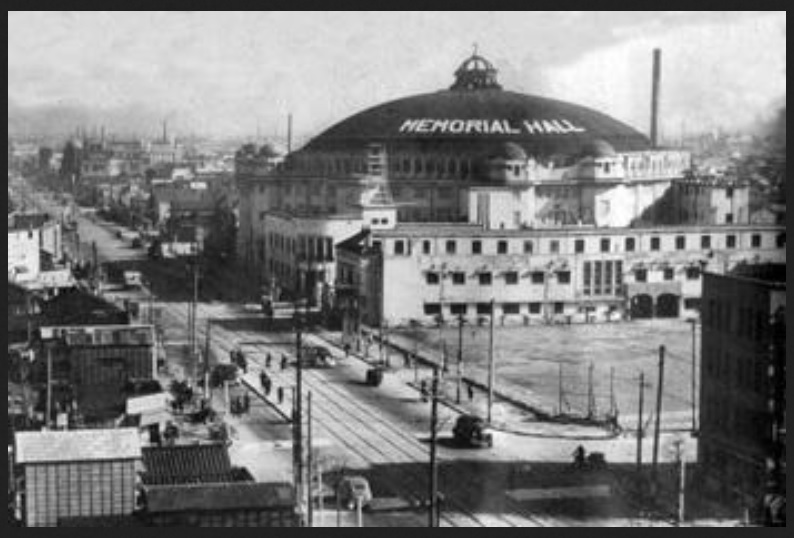
The old Ryōgoku Kokugikan as Memorial Hall during the Occupation (c. 1946)

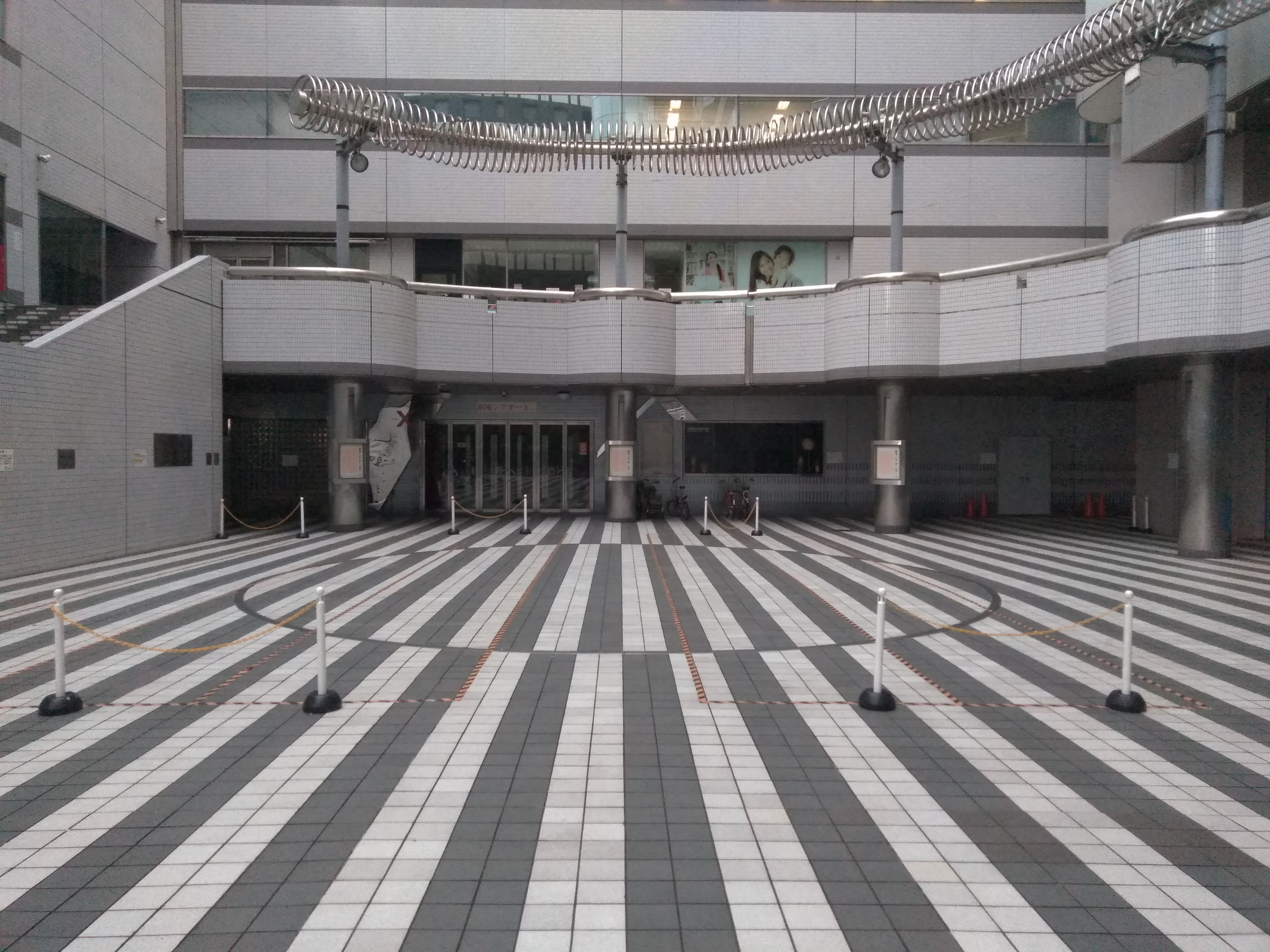
The location of the dohyō of the former Kokugikan (2021).

== Second Ryōgoku Kokugikan ==
Ryōgoku Kokugikan 両国国技館
- Home of Sumo
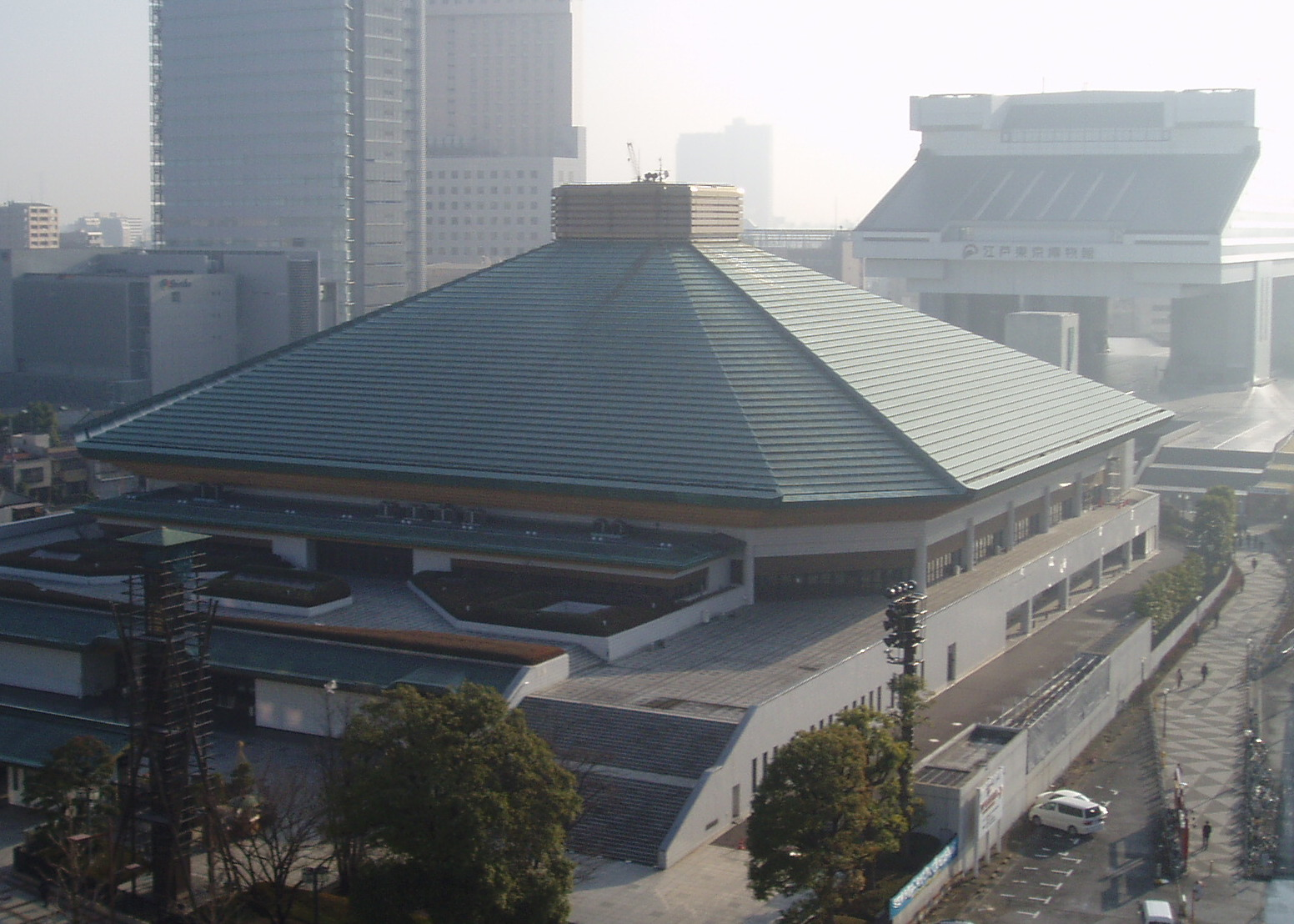
- Ryōgoku Kokugikan, view from the West with the Edo-Tokyo Museum in the background
- Interactive map of Ryōgoku Kokugikan 両国国技館
- Full name: Ryōgoku Kokugikan Sumo Arena
- Address: Sumida; Tokyo; Japan
- Location: 1 Chome-3-28 Yokoami
- Coordinates: 35.69694°N 139.79338°E
- Owner: Japan Sumo Association
- Type: Sumo venues, boxing, pro wrestling, and music concerts
- Main venue: Capacity: 11,098
- Acreage: 35,700 m^{2}
- Public transit: JR East/Toei Subway: Chūō-Sōbu Line and Oedo Line at Ryogoku

Construction
- Groundbreaking: April 27, 1983
- Built: 1983–1985
- Opened: January 9, 1985
- Architect: Takashi Sugiyama Architects
- Builder: Kajima Corporation

The second Ryōgoku Kokugikan opened as the aging Kuramae Kokugikan became less practical due to modernization problems. Therefore, the Japan Sumo Association sought to purchase a new location to build a new arena.

=== History ===
Considering a move to the location of a defunct freight rail yard next to Ryōgoku Station, the Japan Sumo Association began to hold consultations with the Japanese National Railways (JNR) in June 1977. Faced with large deficits at the time, JNR was receptive to the idea of selling the property, aided by its belief that if the new Kokugikan was built next to the station, the number of passengers served would increase. As the land in Kuramae was selected as a candidate site for the construction of a sewage treatment plant in Tokyo, the association acquired the means to purchase the land located in Ryōgoku. The move to Ryōgoku was decided in 1980, and in March 1982, a land purchase contract was concluded between JNR and the Sumo Association. The cost of purchasing the land in Ryōgoku was 9.4 billion yen, while the Sumo Association was able to sell its Kuramae property to the Tokyo Metropolitan Government for 14.3 billion yen. A total of 15 billion yen was procured for the construction of the new arena, comprising the 4.9 billion yen profit from the real estate transactions, 9.6 billion yen the Sumo Association had set aside in reserves, and a 500 million yen subsidy from the Ministry of Education. As the project to build a new arena progressed, the overall picture of a Kokugikan which made full use of modern technology was solidified. The construction faced heavy challenges in terms of cost and construction period as the Sumo Association requested that the construction be shortened by half a year, in place of the two years initially planned, and completed by January 1985.

On September 20, 1982, plans for the new Kokugikan were announced during a press conference. The new arena would be made of three floors above ground and two underground. The total floor area is 35,700 m^{2} and the seating capacity is 11,098. The ring and the square seats on the first floor are movable and can be stored for multi-purpose use, so that they can be used effectively outside the 45 days of the annual sumo competition.

A ground breaking ceremony was held on April 27, 1983. Both yokozuna Kitanoumi and yokozuna Chiyonofuji performed a yokozuna dohyō-iri as part of the Shinto ceremony. On January 9, 1985, the inauguration ceremony and unveiling party were held with 2,300 people in attendance. Following a solemn ritual, both yokozuna performed a yokozuna dohyō-iri, ōzeki Wakashimazu and Asashio performed a Shinto sumo ritual (called shinji-zumō (神事相撲)) and yokozuna Chiyonofuji and Kitanoumi performed a very rare sandangamae ceremony.

=== Technical specifications ===
The planned construction site for the new Kokugikan is a place prone to urban floods, therefore the introduction of a rainwater utilization system for the Kokugikan was asked by the Sumida municipality. The roof area is 8,360 m^{2}. Rainwater is stored in an underground 1,000 m^{3} rainwater tank, and 70% of miscellaneous water used at the Kokugikan is covered by this rainwater. In the event of an earthquake, this water can be used as emergency domestic water. When a heavy snowfall falls, this rainwater can be ejected from the headdress on the roof to melt the snow. The ring is illuminated by 124 lights for TV broadcasts, and the angles of each are adjusted so as not to interfere with the wrestlers' mental unity and to prevent halation caused by the wrestlers' sweat. In addition, since Japanese people have dark hair, the lighting in the audience seats on the background of the ring is adjusted so that the colors appearing on the TV screen are not dark. The Ryōgoku Kokugikan houses the offices of the Japan Sumo Association and, at the rear of building, the "Sumo School" where new recruits must complete a six-month course on various topics such as calligraphy, sports science, sumo history and civics in addition to sumo's basic movements and techniques. Near the main entrance, two Inari shrines (called Toyokuni Inari and Shusse Inari) are dedicated to wrestlers safety and success. Originally the twin-shrines were built in the backyard of the former Ryōgoku Kokugikan and were relocated in 1963 in the Kuramae Kokugikan before finally moving to their current location. The arena also includes a number of dedicated venues such as the Sumo Museum, restaurants or a banquet hall for chankonabe tasting.

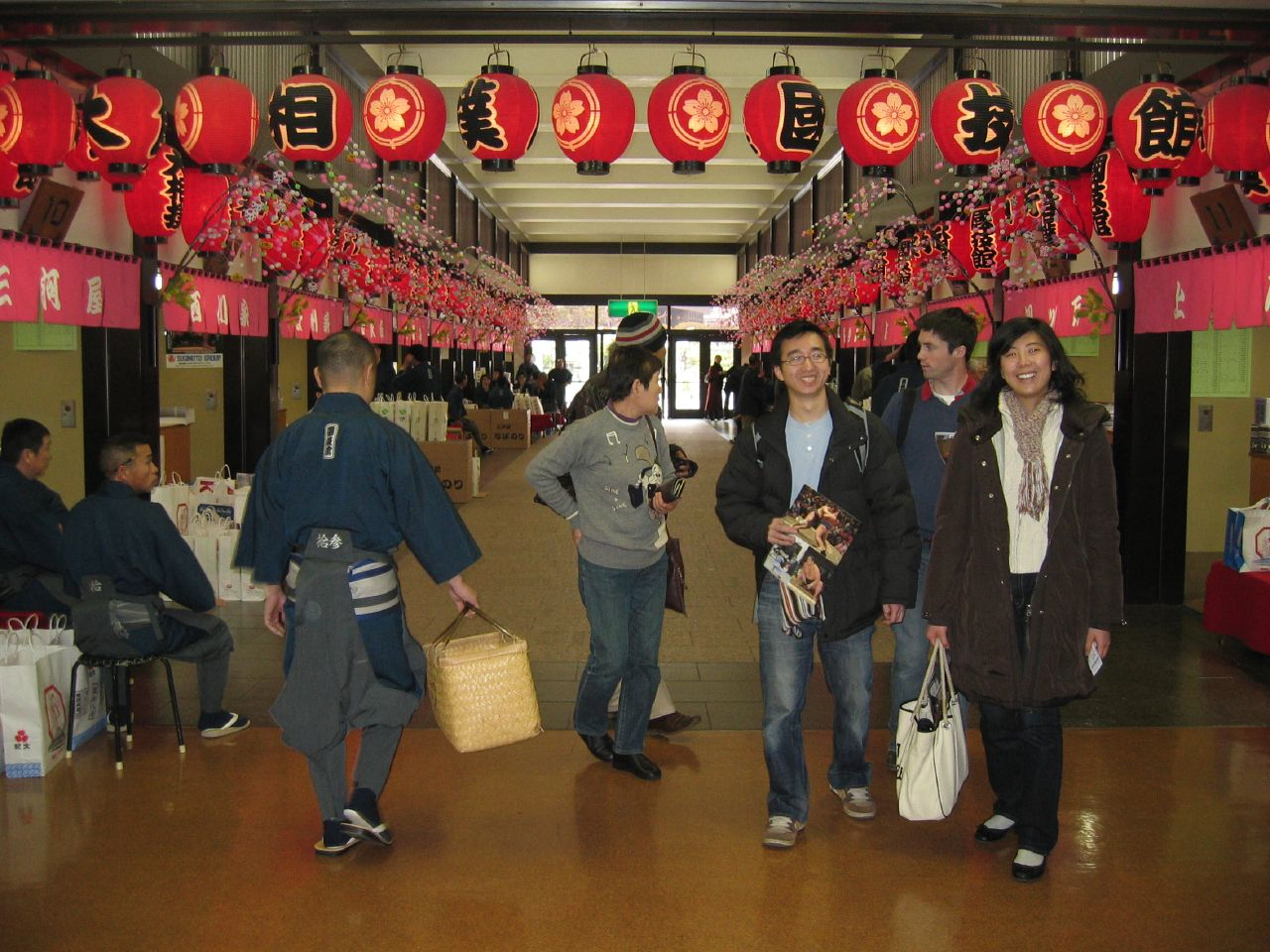
The tea house street located in the Kokugikan in January 2008

Emblematic venues also includes the Annaijo Entrance (lit. Information desk, also called Chaya-dori: Tea House Street), a flower-theme decorated corridor for souvenirs buying. Now under the control of the Japan Sumo Association, the cha-ya were originally independent named teahouses that sold tickets and refreshments to their customers. Following a system of inheritance, today's 20 businesses can be dated back to the nineteenth century, the oldest teahouse dating back to 1818. Now the teahouses also offer gifts packages. Their services usually go to regular customers who have agreements in place. Attendants (called dekata) dressed in attire that resembles a yobidashi, guide patrons to their seats and supply them with refreshments in exchange of a tip.

The Ryōgoku Kokugikan also has its own yakitori skewers factory in the basement of the building.

=== Sumo ===
For its first tournament, the Ryōgoku Kokugikan was visited by Emperor Shōwa. It was the first time Tenran-sumo was performed on the first day of the first tournament of the year. The January 1985 tournament also marked a milestone in Sumo as yokozuna Chiyonofuji achieved a zenshō yusho while yokozuna Kitanoumi (who had been yokozuna for 10 years) announced his retirement on the third day of the tournament after three consecutives defeats.

Since its completion, the Ryōgoku Kokugikan is the place where all Tokyo tournaments are held in January, May and September. The arena also holds other sumo related events such as retirement ceremonies, known as danpatsu-shiki, where sekitori-ranked wrestlers ritually cut their topknot in a long and solemn ceremony. Only sekitori with at least 30 tournaments in the top division can qualify for a ceremony at the Kokugikan, other wrestlers usually perform the ceremony at hotels or in their stable. Kanreki dohyō-iri ceremonies, where former yokozuna celebrate their sixtieth birthday during a particular yokozuna dohyō-iri ceremony, are also usually held at the Kokugikan.

The Kokugikan also holds sumo events for boys such as the Goodwill Sumo Tournament, and high-school championships, such as the National Junior High School Sumo Tournament. The arena also regularly hold the All Japan Sumo Championships (Japan Sumo Federation main event) and until 2025, the Hakuhō Cup (a children's sumo event), where it was moved because of the former yokozuna's departure from the Japan Sumo Federation and prohibition of women's sumo in the venue. Also, prior to each Tokyo tournaments, willing wrestlers will meet in joint training in the training room of the Sumo School for four to six days. These trainings are usually in presence of the press and oyakata. Finally, the public broadcast company NHK hold in the Kokugikan its own Sumo event, called the NHK Welfare Sumo Tournament (NHK福祉大相撲, Enu Eichi Kei Fukushi Ōzumō). Taking place each February, this charity event has been held since 1966. It takes the form of a festival where traditional jungyo activities are performed (sumo wrestlers songs, yokozuna's tsuna exhibition, makuuchi bouts). The profits are donated to social care institutions across the country.

=== Other sports ===
Like the Kuramae Kokugikan, the Ryōgoku Kokugikan hosted a number of professional wrestling events as soon as its first year of service. In September 1985, the first wrestling card, promoted by All Japan Pro Wrestling, happened with the first Japanese appearance of the Road Warriors. In December of the same year, New Japan Pro Wrestling (NJPW) held its first card in the Ryogoku. It became a regular venue for NJPW's events such as the G1 Climax. In 1998, Antonio Inoki's Universal Fighting-Arts Organization held its first card at the arena. As All Japan began to use the Nippon Budokan as its main venue, the Ryōgoku Kokugikan became established as a venue for rival promotion NJPW. In 2009, DDT Pro-Wrestling held its first event in the arena. World Wonder Ring Stardom has held multiple events in Ryōgoku beginning in 2013. WWE also held numerous events in the Ryōgoku between 2010 and 2015, the latest being WWE's The Beast in the East. Other promotions to have held an event at the venue include Super World of Sports, UWF International, Fighting Network Rings, All Japan Women's Pro-Wrestling, Wrestle and Romance, JWP Joshi Puroresu, Michinoku Pro Wrestling, Tokyo Pro Wrestling, Battlarts, Pro Wrestling Zero1, World Japan, Hustle, Ladies Legend Pro-Wrestling, Inoki Genome Federation, Dragongate, Pro Wrestling Noah, Wrestle-1, Big Japan Pro Wrestling, Tenryu Project, Tokyo Joshi Pro-Wrestling, Gleat, and Dream Star Fighting Marigold.

The Kokugikan also host Boxing competitions including the hosting of the boxing competition at the 2020 Summer Olympics. In 2025, it will also host Capcom Cup 11, a Street Fighter 6 championship event for Capcom Pro Tour 2024.

=== Other events ===
In 1992, The Kokugikan hosted the very first official Street Fighter II tournament. On November 27, 1986, the American heavy metal band Quiet Riot performed at the venue as part of their QR III tour. On April 4, 2014, the K-pop boy group Got7 held their first Japanese showcase in the venue. In 2017 it hosted Ferrari's 70th anniversary celebrations. Paul McCartney performed a concert at the venue as part of his world tour "Freshen Up" on November 5, 2018.

In May 2021 the stadium was used as a vaccination center for the COVID-19 vaccine, with some retired sumo wrestlers among those getting vaccinated.

=== Gallery ===
Ryōgoku Kokugikan 1985–present
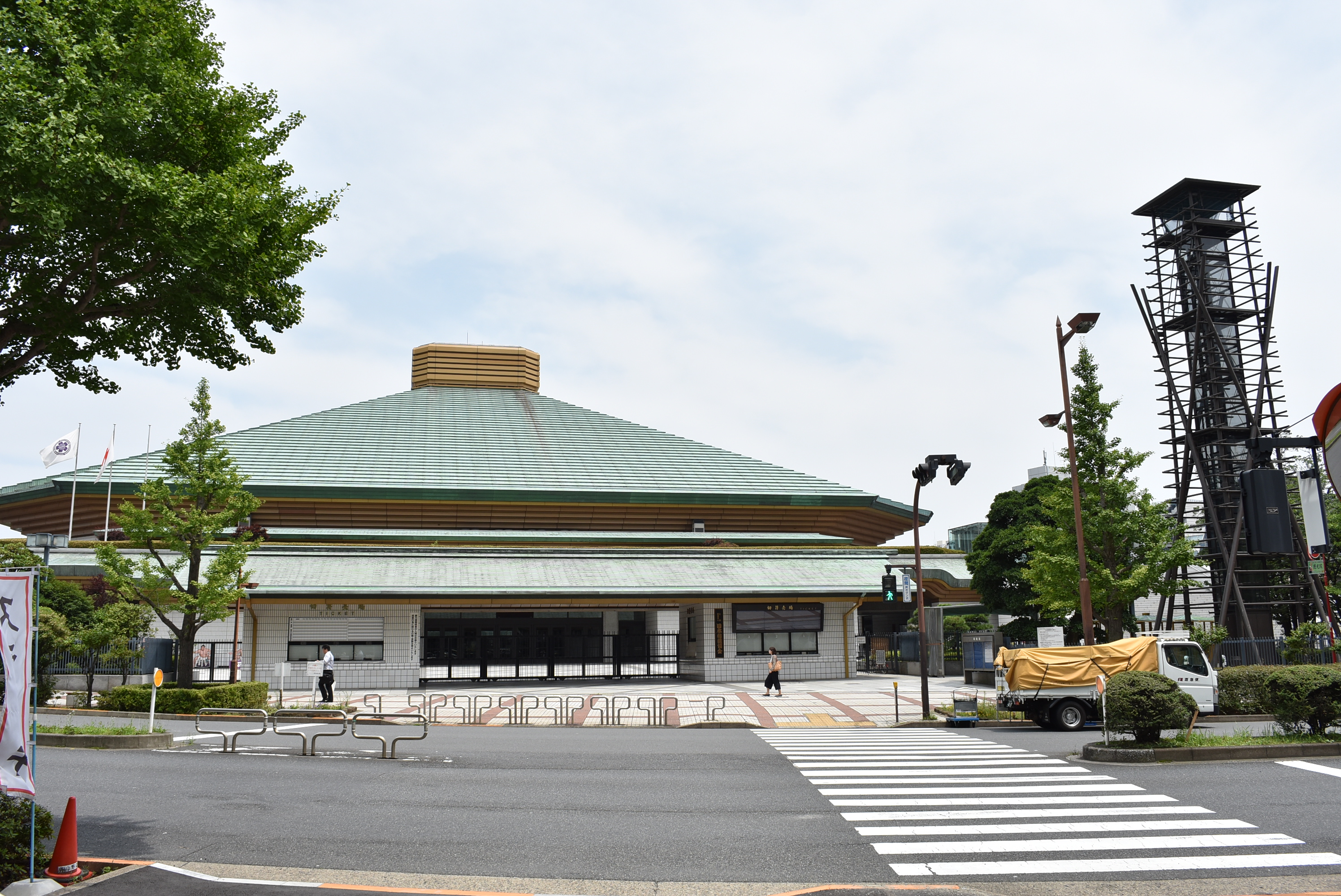
Main entrance of the building, note the tower from which the yosedaiko is performed

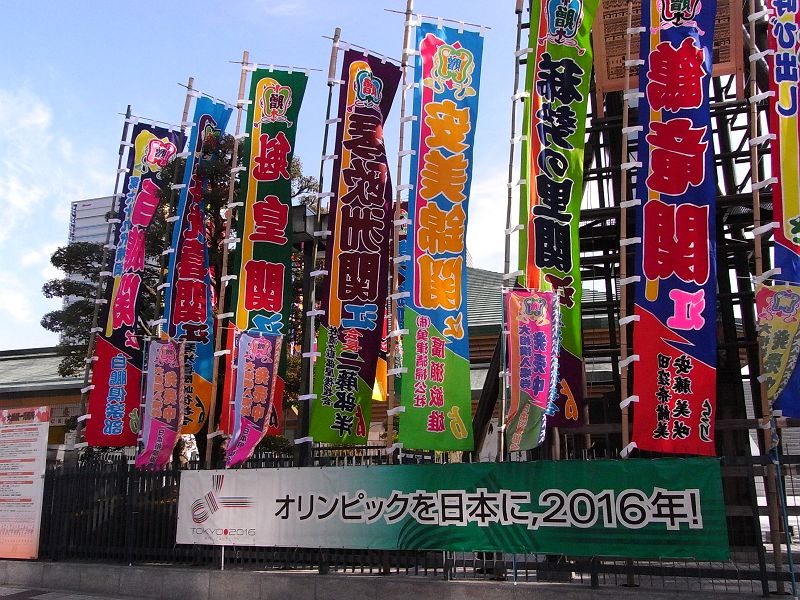
Wrestlers’ colourful banners are shown above the wall of the main entrance during the days of tournaments.

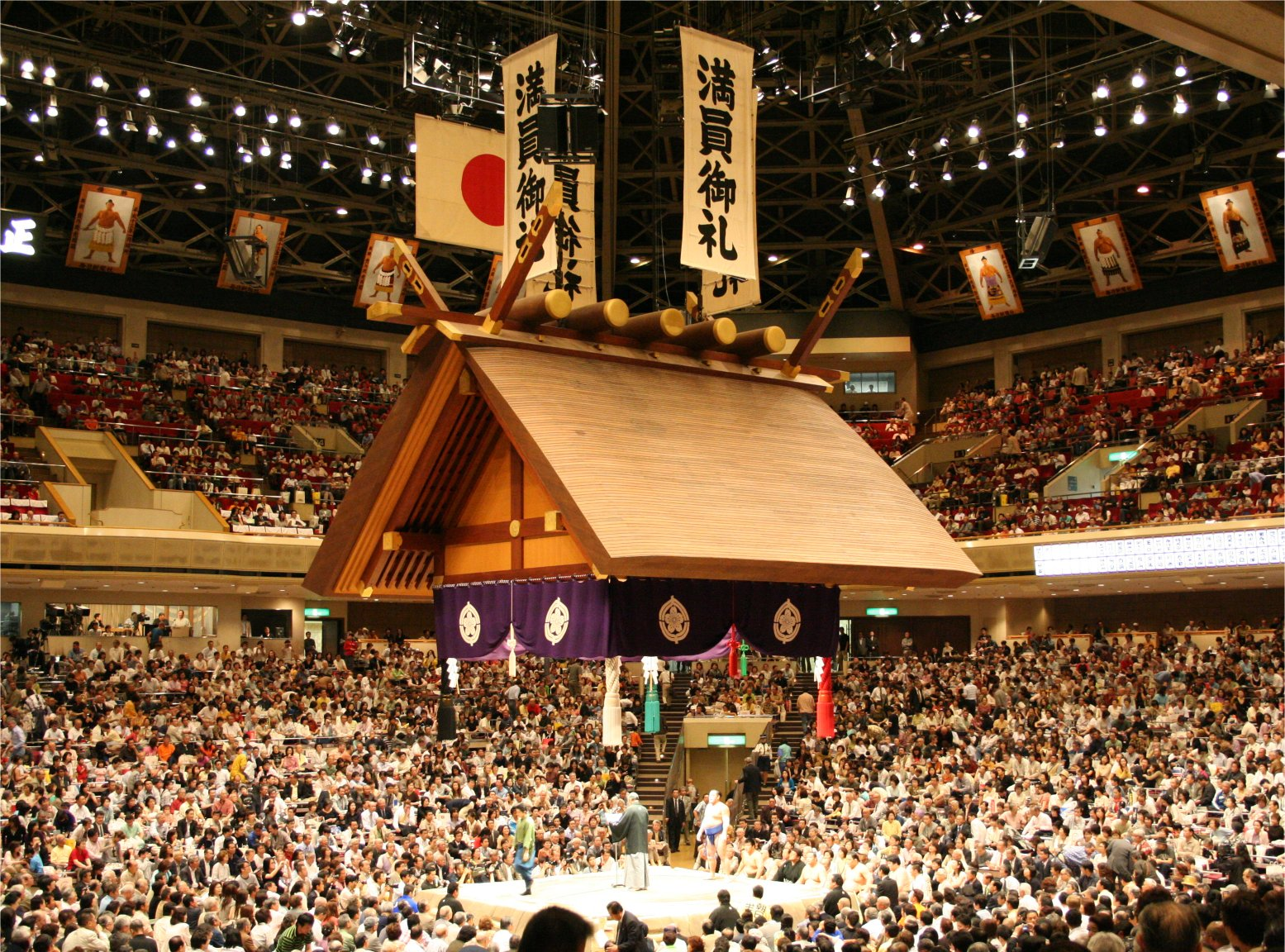
Inside of the arena during a tournament. The Japanese flag is always raised on top of the Shinto roof and portraits of the previous tournament winners are hung on top of the arena. White banners (called "man'in onrei", 満員御礼) on top of the roof indicates that the event is full.

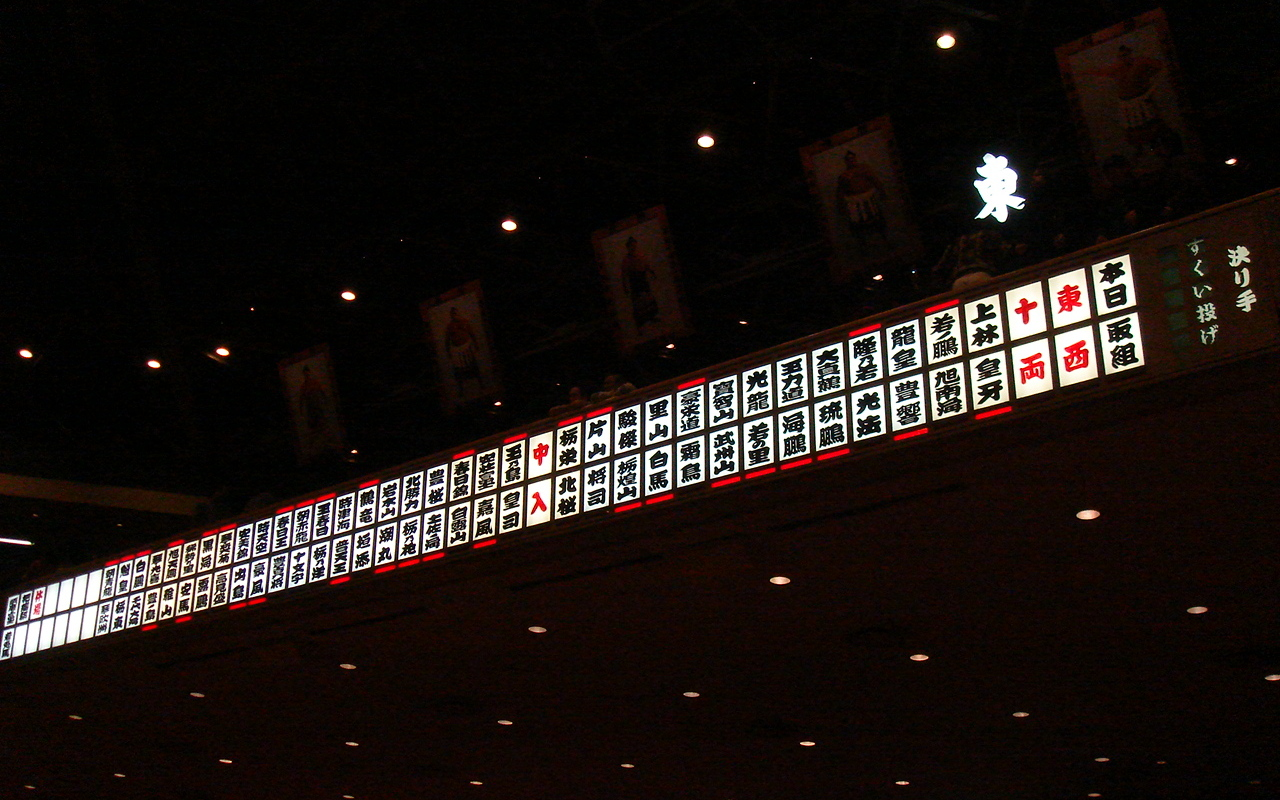
Electric scoreboard

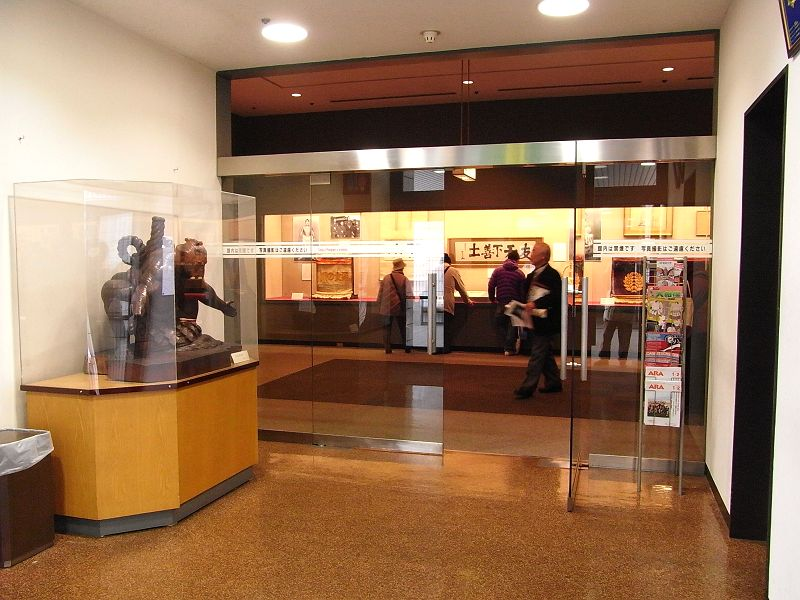
Entrance of the Sumo Museum located in the Ryōgoku Kokugikan

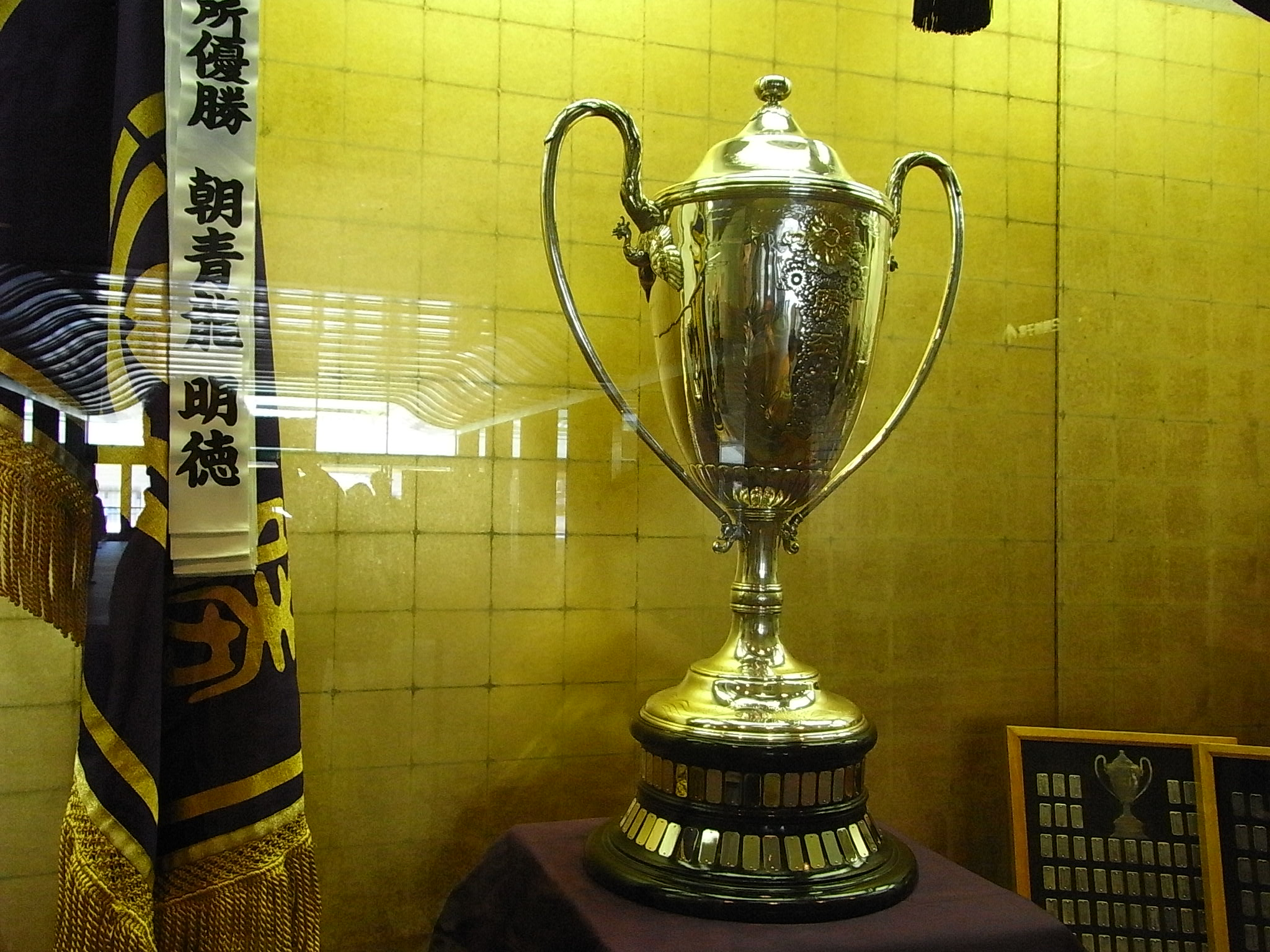
Sumo's main trophy, the Emperor's Cup, and the winner's flag on display in the entrance hall

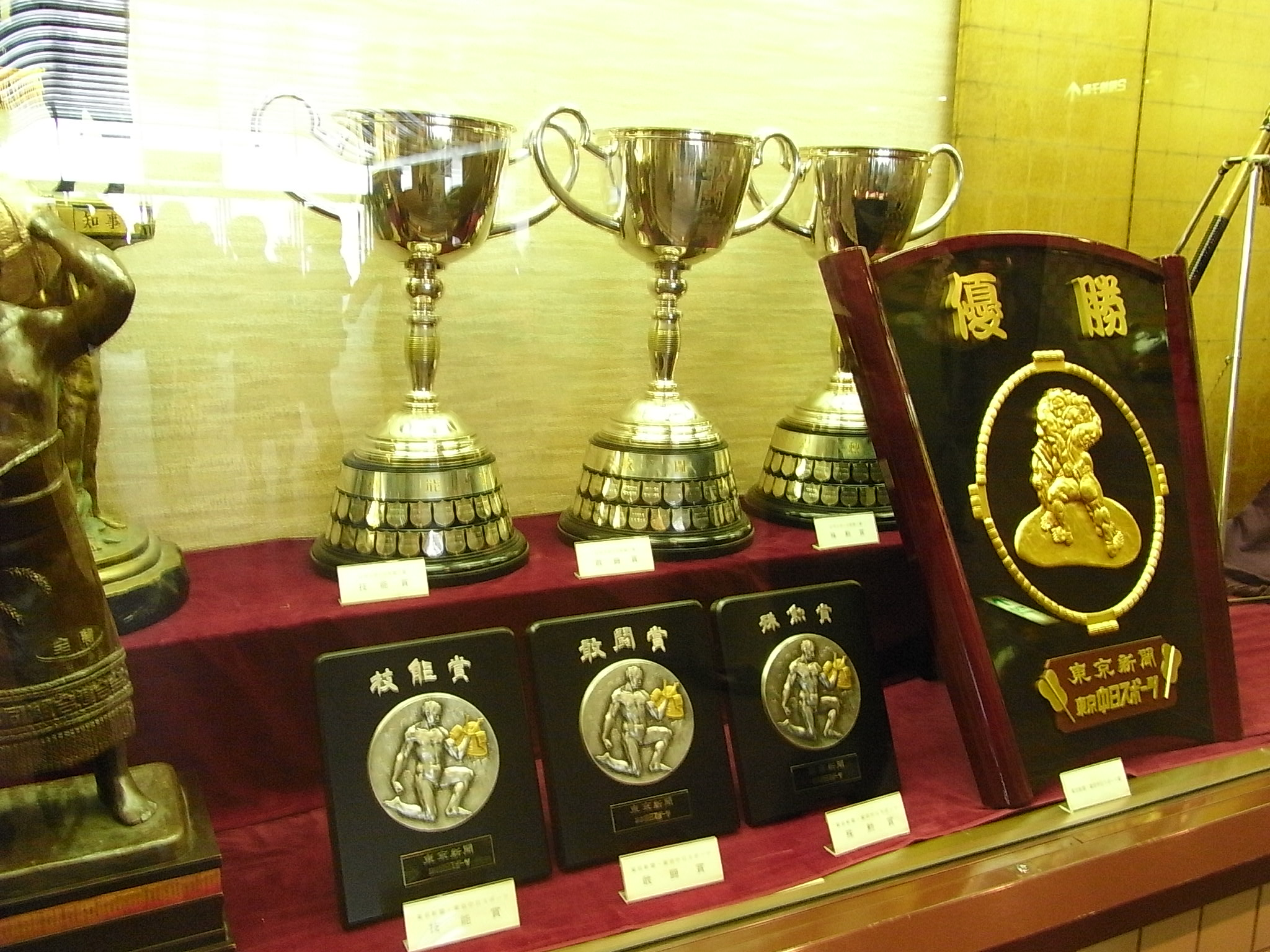
Sanshō rewards for the most meritorious wrestlers (from left to right: Technique prize, Fighting Spirit prize, Outstanding Performance prize) on display in the entrance hall

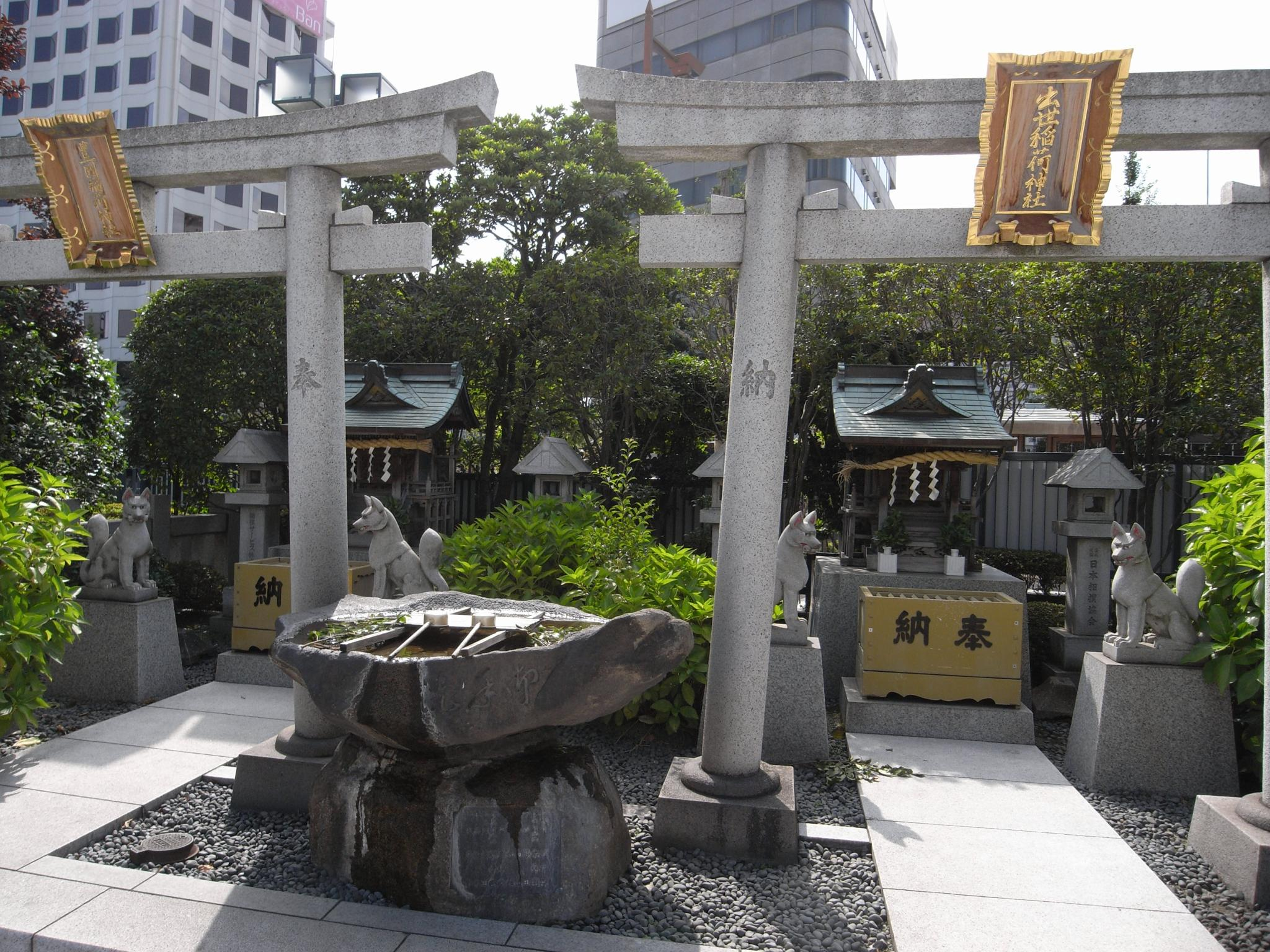
The two small Inari shrines located on the Ryōgoku Kokugikan

=== Transportation links ===
The arena is served by the Ryōgoku Station with platforms to the south and east of the arena. The JR East Chūō-Sōbu Line platforms to the south are served by local trains while rapid trains bypass the platforms by going through a tunnel north of the platforms. The two main platforms are built as an island platform, with trains heading west to Tokyo and east to Chiba, while there is a third terminal platform that is only used on special event days. The Toei Subway Ōedo Line platforms lie in a north–south axis directly underneath Kiyosumi Street to the east of the arena. There are regular trains to Iidabashi and Tochomae from platform 1 and Daimon and Roppongi from platform 2.

== See also ==
- List of indoor arenas in Japan

== Notes ==
1.Ban on martial arts gatherings enforced from 1945 to 1950.
2.Called Takasago, Kinokuni, Yamato, Yoshikazu, Minohisa, Nakahashi, Wakashima, Joshu, Nishikawa, Mikawaya, Kamisho, Shimman, Musashiya, Hakuho, Hasegawa, Kabira, Fujishima, Isefuku, Tatekawa and Hayashi.
3.Tenran-sumo (天覧相撲) are sumo bouts in presence of the emperor.
