= Ekō-in =

Buddhist temple in Tokyo

Coordinates: 35°41′36.39″N 139°47′31.31″E

Ekō-in 回向院
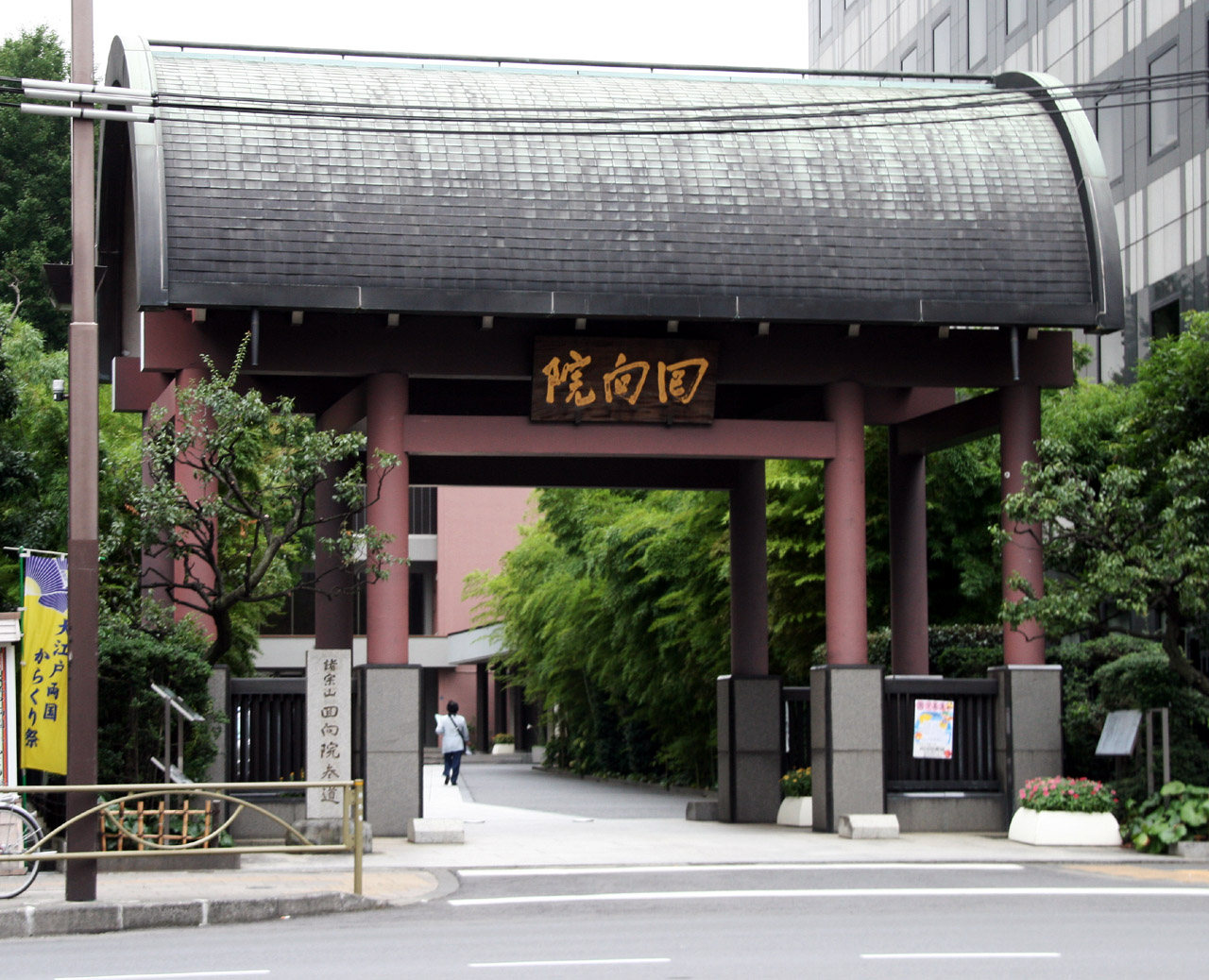

Religion
- Affiliation: Jōdo-shū

Location
- Location: Ryōgoku, Sumida, Tokyo
- Country: Japan
- Interactive map of Ekō-in 回向院

Architecture
- Founder: Jun'yo Jōjin (founder); Tokugawa Ietsuna
- Completed: 1657 (Meireki 3)

Website
- www.ekoin.or.jp/history_e.html

Ekō-in (回向院), also known as Honjo Ekō-in, is a Jōdo-shū Buddhist temple in Ryōgoku, Tokyo. The formal name of the temple is Shoshūzan Muen-ji Ekō-in (諸宗山 無縁寺 回向院), reflecting its founding principle of Pariṇāmanā, or the spreading of Amida Buddha's benevolence to all souls of all living creatures.

== History ==
On March 2, 1657, the Great Fire of Meireki destroyed 60 to 70% of the city of Edo (Tokyo) and killed about 100,000 people. The shōgun Tokugawa Ietsuna wished to commemorate the victims of the fire, most of whom were not survived by relatives. For this purpose he erected a monument called the Banninzuka (Mound of a Million Souls) and held a great memorial service conducted by Jun'yo Jōjin (遵誉上人; Holy Priest Junyo) of Zōjō-ji. A temple for prayers to Amida Buddha was built at the same time. This was the origin of the Ekō-in, which today continues to offer a resting place for any soul who did not leave relatives behind, including victims of natural disasters, prisoners, and animals.

== Sumo ==
The temple was known as a sumo wrestling venue during the Edo and Meiji periods. The kanjin-zumō, a charity fund raising event permitted by the Tokugawa shogunate and the origin of the current professional sumo, was first held in the temple in September 1768. The temple was the site of all tournaments from October 1833 to 1909. These 76 years are known as the period of "Ekō-in sumō". A large, two-story temporary facility was built next to the temple for the sumo matches.

In 1909, the tournaments were moved into the original Ryōgoku Kokugikan, a modern arena in the temple precincts that had a capacity of 13,000 spectators and that was nicknamed as the Great Iron Umbrella. This contributed to the popularity of the sport by making it possible to hold sumo tournaments regardless of the weather. Also in the precincts is a monument called the Chikara-zuka (力塚; 'power mound'), built in 1937 by the Sumo Association as a memorial to past wrestlers. Today it has become a place where apprentice wrestlers come to pray for power.

After World War II, sumo tournaments moved to various venues in Tokyo and then to the Kuramae Kokugikan arena in Taitō, Tokyo, before returning to the Ryōgoku district in 1985. The current Ryōgoku Kokugikan arena is located only about 400 meters from the temple.

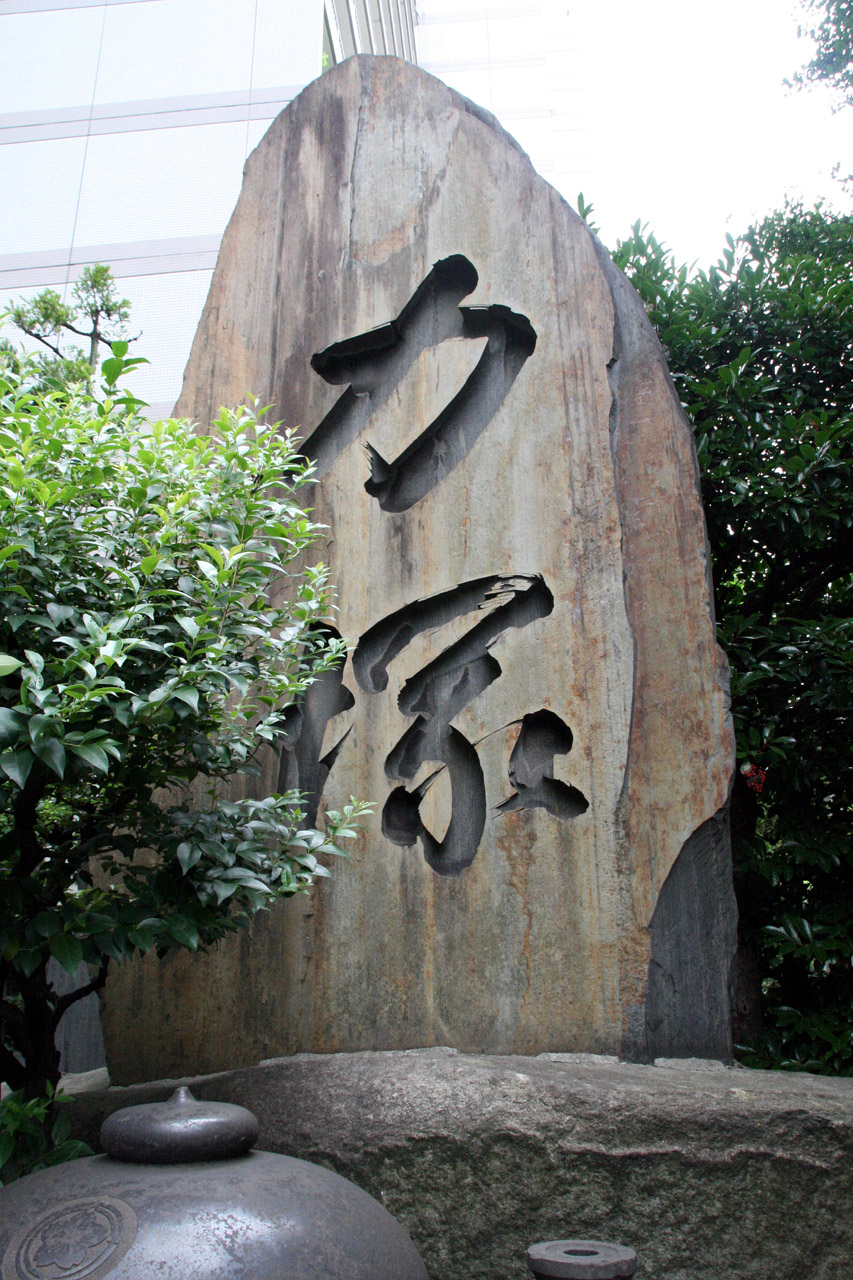
The Chikara-zuka in the temple precincts

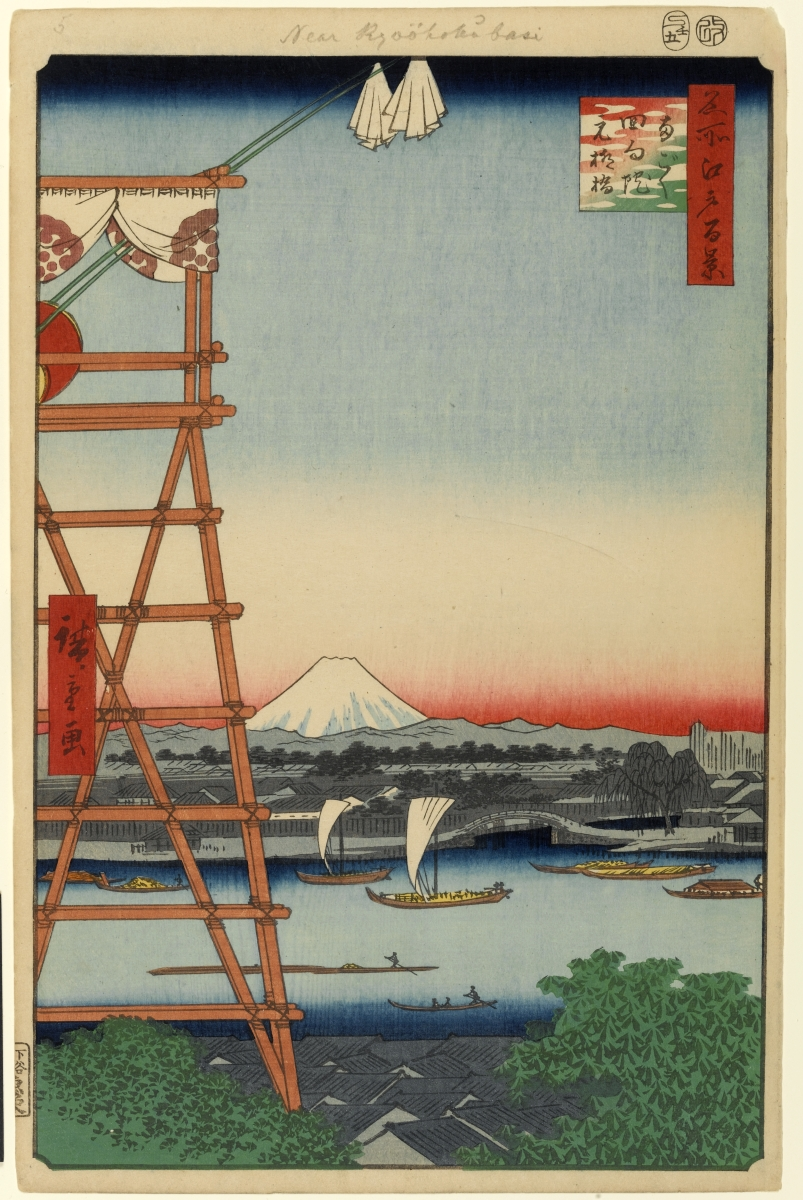
An ukiyo-e print by Utagawa Hiroshige, showing the Ekō-in's tower for the drum roll signifying the start of a sumo tournament, from 100 Famous Views of Edo.

== Famous people buried at the temple ==
- Takemoto Gidayū (1651–1714), a Jōruri chanter
- Santō Kyōden (1761–1816), an artist of the Edo period
- Nezumi Kozō (1797–1832), a thief and folk hero
