= List of mines in Japan =

This list of mines in Japan is subsidiary to the list of mines article and lists working, defunct and future mines in the country. For practical purposes stone, marble and other quarries may be included in this list. This list is inherently incomplete and shows only a selection of the most notable mines.

List of mines in Japan (Japan)

Copper Iron (triangle mark) Gold/Silver Alkali/bases Lanthanide/Actinide other metals Coal, oil or oil slate Chalcogen/Halogen other non-metal stone, crystals and complex compounds

== List of mines in Japan ==
Mine	Produce	!Coordinates	Associated town	Owner	Opened	Closed	Comments
Ichinokawa Mine	Antimony	33.889°N 133.219°E	Saijō, Ehime		1659	1957	
Kimu mine	Antimony	26.499°N 127.903°E	Okinawa Island		?	?	
Tsugu mine	Antimony	35.178°N 137.629°E	Shitara, Aichi		15##	1956	
Obira mine	Arsenic	32.842°N 131.578°E	Bungo-ōno, Oita		?	?	also contains boron and fluorine minerals
Matsuiwa mine	Arsenic	38.967°N 141.519°E	Kesennuma, Miyagi		1949	1974	also contains some uranium, silver and gold
Sasagatani mine	Arsenic	34.549°N 131.703°E	Tsuwano, Shimane		?	?	closed
Akenobe mine	Arsenic	35.283°N 134.667°E	Yabu, Hyōgo		1908	1987	
Nozawa mine	Asbestos	43.267°N 142.403°E	Furano, Hokkaido		1942	1969	
Gunma-tetsuzan	Barium	36.653°N 138.597°E	Nakanojō, Gunma		1943	1975	
Minamishiraoi baryte mine	Barium	42.661°N 141.226°E	Shiraoi, Hokkaido		1950	1988	
Otaru-Matsukura mine	Barium	43.127°N 140.964°E	Otaru		1932	1979	
Fukuoka mine	Beryllium	35.586°N 137.468°E	Nakatsugawa, Gifu	Furukawa	?	?	Closed
Sannotake mine	Bismuth	33.7°N 130.85°E	Tagawa, Fukuoka		?	?	includes Yokozuru mine
Fukuoka mine	Bismuth	35.586°N 137.468°E	Nakatsugawa, Gifu	Furukawa	?	?	Closed
Inaushi mine	Bismuth	43.242°N 143.722°E	Kitami, Hokkaido		1934	1964	
Hosokura mine	Cadmium	38.808°N 140.9°E	Kurihara, Miyagi		1898	1977	now become an amusement park
Fuka mine	Calcite	34.767°N 133.433°E	Takahashi, Okayama		?	open	high purity, used for toothpaste
Hirose mine	Chromium	35.067°N 133.2°E	Hino, Tottori		?	?	closed
Nittō mine	Chromium	42.572°N 142.287°E	Saru, Hokkaido		1917	1959	
Amakusa coalfield	coal	32.25°N 130.06°E	Amakusa		186#	1963	closed but not depleted
Mogami coal field	coal	38.613°N 140.331°E	Ōishida, Yamagata		?	open	lignite rich in germanium
Iwate mine	coal	39.885°N 141.631°E	Iwaizumi, Iwate		?	?	
Hokutan Horonai coal mine	coal	43.221°N 141.909°E	Mikasa, Hokkaido	Hokutan	1879	1989	Went Bankrupt
Kami-sunagawa coal mine	coal	43.476°N 141.992°E	Kamisunagawa	Mitsui	1915	1986	Japan Microgravity Centre
Hokutan Yūbari mine	coal	43.064°N 141.985°E	Yūbari	Hokutan	1890	197#	Went Bankrupt
Hokutan Ikushunbetsu coal mine	coal	43.261°N 141.968°E	Ikushunbetsu	Hokutan	1885	1957	
Miike coal mine	coal	33.014°N 130.456°E	Ōmuta	Tachibana clan	1872	1997	
Mitsubishi Hashima coal mine	coal	32.628°N 129.738°E	Hashima	Mitsubishi	1869	1974	Closed
Iriomote Coal Mine	coal	24.333°N 123.8°E	Iriomote	Mitsui	1886	1960	Closed
Utara Coal Mine	coal	24.302°N 123.707°E	Iriomote	Marusan Mining Company	1936	1943	Closed
Shirataki mine	Cobalt	33.828°N 133.472°E	Ōkawa, Kōchi	Nippon Mining Co	?	?	
Besshi copper mine	Copper	33.853°N 133.314°E	Niihama, Ehime	Sumitomo	1691	1973	
Chiyogahara mine	Cobalt	38.867°N 141.35°E	Fujisawa, Iwate		?	?	
Hitachi mine	Cobalt	36.629°N 140.606°E	Hitachi, Ibaraki		1905	1974	
Kune mine	Cobalt	35.085°N 137.833°E	Hamamatsu, Shizuoka		1897	open	
Tenryū mine	Cobalt	35.283°N 137.85°E	Tenryū, Nagano		?	open	
Naganobori mine	Cobalt	34.245°N 131.336°E	Mine, Yamaguchi		1941	1945	
Shimokawa mine	Cobalt	44.215°N 142.701°E	Shimokawa, Hokkaido		1941	1979	
Kosaka mine	Copper	40.337°N 140.754°E	Kosaka, Akita	Dowa Holdings	18##	?	
Hanaoka mine	Copper	40.309°N 140.552°E	Ōdate, Akita	Kajima, Dowa mining	1885	?	the site of Hanaoka Incident during WWII
Nonowaki mine	Copper	33.9°N 134.247°E	Naka, Tokushima		?	196#	
Minawa mine	Copper	33.992°N 133.786°E	Miyoshi, Tokushima		1956	1970	
Shirataki mine	Copper	33.828°N 133.472°E	Ōkawa, Kōchi	Nippon Mining Co	?	?	
Shingu mine	Copper	33.933°N 133.633°E	Shikokuchūō, Ehime		1911	1975	also diamond-bearing Lherzolite
Motoyasu mine	Copper	33.796°N 133.253°E	Saijō, Ehime		1877	1972	
Ōkuki mine	Copper	33.514°N 132.656°E	Uchiko, Ehime		?	?	
Sazare mine	Copper	33.904°N 133.542°E	Niihama, Ehime		?	1979	
Ikadazu mine	Copper	33.832°N 133.383°E	Niihama, Ehime		?	1973	
Besshi copper mine	Copper	33.853°N 133.314°E	Niihama, Ehime	Sumitomo	1691	1973	
Yuryo mine	Copper	33.707°N 132.803°E	Iyo, Ehime		1938	1954	
Hirota mine	Copper	33.65°N 132.8°E	Iyo, Ehime		1917	1930	
Takaura mine	Copper	33.376°N 132.122°E	Ikata, Ehime		1914	1965	
Ōku mine	Copper	33.412°N 132.181°E	Ikata, Ehime		?	closed	
Obira mine	Copper	32.842°N 131.578°E	Bungo-ōno, Oita		?	?	also contains boron and fluorine minerals
Matsubara-douzan mine	Copper	27.861°N 128.917°E	Tokunoshima		1903	1928	
Moe-Tatsugo mine	Copper	28.459°N 129.61°E	Amami Ōshima		?	closed	
Mitate mine	Copper	32.775°N 131.472°E	Hinokage, Miyazaki	Rasa Industries	1915	1970	on slopes of Mount Sobo
Makimine mine	Copper	32.63°N 131.458°E	Hinokage, Miyazaki	Mitsubishi	194x	?	
Iwato mine	Copper	31.277°N 130.326°E	Makurazaki, Kagoshima		?	?	
Sannotake mine	Copper	33.7°N 130.85°E	Tagawa, Fukuoka		?	?	includes Yokozuru mine
Yoshiwara mine	Copper	33.75°N 130.85°E	Kitakyushu, Fukuoka		1910	1971	
Ōizumi mine	Copper	38.413°N 139.728°E	Tsuruoka, Yamagata		1882	1950	
Ohori mine	Copper	38.746°N 140.464°E	Mogami, Yamagata		?	?	
Isobe-Koyama mine	Copper	38.45°N 140.217°E	Sagae, Yamagata		1932	1977	
Akayama mine	Copper	38.074°N 140.303°E	Naragejuku, Yamagata		16xx	1972	also contains some zinc, silver and gold
Matsuiwa mine	Copper	38.967°N 141.519°E	Kesennuma, Miyagi		1949	1974	also contains some uranium, silver and gold
Oarasawa-Akutozawa mine	Copper	39.274°N 140.894°E	Waga, Iwate		1907	1920	116 kt Cu produced
Hanawa 2 mine	Copper	40.176°N 140.867°E	Hachimantai, Iwate		?	?	not to be confused with Hanawa manganese mine in Miyako, Iwate
Unekura mine	Copper	39.233°N 140.85°E	Yuda, Iwate	Dowa Kogyo K. K.	?	open	
Akaishi mine	Copper	39.36°N 140.792°E	Yuda, Iwate		1914	1973	
Tsunatori mine	Copper	39.304°N 140.942°E	Waga District, Iwate		1908	1962	
Sennin mine	Copper	39.311°N 140.889°E	Waga District, Iwate		1911	1974	also called Wagasennin mine
Mizusawa mine	Copper	39.437°N 140.776°E	Waga District, Iwate		1717	?	
Yokota mine	Copper	37.388°N 139.442°E	Kaneyama, Fukushima		?	?	
Yaso mine	Copper	37.058°N 139.658°E	Minamiaizu, Fukushima		1952	1970	
Takanokura mine	Copper	37.626°N 140.822°E	Sōma, Fukushima		?	?	
Tada mine	Copper	34.893°N 135.358°E	Inagawa, Hyōgo	Nihon Kogyo	1211	1973	
Tochigi mine	Copper	36.794°N 139.814°E	Shioya, Tochigi		1946	1965	
Kidogasawa mine	Copper	36.797°N 139.7°E	Nikkō, Tochigi		1940	1974	
Chichibu mine	Copper	36.022°N 138.817°E	Ōtaki, Saitama		708	?	first ever copper mine of Japan
Fujigatani mine	Copper	34.144°N 132.017°E	Iwakuni, Yamaguchi		1955	1977	closed
Sasagatani mine	Copper	34.549°N 131.703°E	Tsuwano, Shimane		?	?	closed
Iwami Ginzan Silver Mine	Copper	35.164°N 132.442°E	Ōda, Shimane		130#	1923	world leading medieval silver producer
Tsumo mine	Copper	34.65°N 131.986°E	Masuda, Shimane		195x	?	
Yoshioka mine	Copper	34.858°N 133.458°E	Takahashi, Okayama		1905	1972	
Sasaune mine	Copper	34.853°N 133.472°E	Takahashi, Okayama		?	196#	also produced iron pigment
Shin-mikawa mine	Copper	34.633°N 133.583°E	Yakage, Okayama		1916	1957	
Obie mine	Copper	34.611°N 133.797°E	Kurashiki, Okayama		1906	1947	
Yanahara mine	Copper	34.958°N 134.069°E	Misaki, Okayama		195#	1970	also produced iron oxide for audio tapes
Takara mine	Copper	35.575°N 138.85°E	Tsuru, Yamanashi		1942	1962	also produced pyrite
Kune mine	Copper	35.085°N 137.833°E	Hamamatsu, Shizuoka		1897	open	
Kusakura mine	Copper	37.683°N 139.483°E	Kanose, Niigata	Furukawa	1738	?	
Ogoya mine	Copper	36.293°N 136.592°E	Komatsu, Ishikawa		1884	1971	
Hatasa mine	Copper	35.852°N 137.063°E	Gujō, Gifu		1674	1916	
Nojiri mine	Copper	35.876°N 136.717°E	Ōno, Fukui		?	1968	Underwater after construction of Kuzuryu Dam
Nakatatsu mine	Copper	35.873°N 136.578°E	Ōno, Fukui		?	?	Closed
Nakauri mine	Copper	34.849°N 137.552°E	Kamaishi, Iwate		1953	1953	worked for 3 months
Kamaishi mine	Copper	39.3°N 141.683°E	Kamaishi, Iwate		1727	1993	Dominant iron producer of Japan pre-war
Ashio copper mine	Copper	36.633°N 139.444°E	Nikkō, Tochigi	Furukawa	1600	1973	Largest copper output during late 19th century, place of 1907 Ashio riot
Yaguki mine	Copper	37.171°N 140.915°E	Iwaki, Fukushima		1945	1974	
Obira mine	Copper	32.842°N 131.578°E	mount Sobo in Nishiusuki, Miyazaki		1617	1954	
Horobetsu mine	Copper	42.475°N 141.05°E	Noboribetsu, Hokkaido		1898	1973	
Shimokawa mine	Copper	44.215°N 142.701°E	Shimokawa, Hokkaido		1941	1979	
Kunitomi Mine	Copper	43.008°N 140.658°E	Shiribeshi, Hokkaido		1909	1945	
Suttsu mine	Copper	42.772°N 140.293°E	Suttsu District, Hokkaido		?	1962	
Akenobe mine	Copper	35.283°N 134.667°E	Yabu, Hyōgo		1908	1987	
Myoho mine	Copper	33.653°N 135.819°E	Higashimuro District, Wakayama		1948	1965	
Mogami coal field	Germanium	38.613°N 140.331°E	Ōishida, Yamagata		?	open	lignite rich in germanium
Ōkuki mine	Gold	33.514°N 132.656°E	Uchiko, Ehime		?	?	
Takaura mine	Gold	33.376°N 132.122°E	Ikata, Ehime		1914	1965	
Taio gold mine	Gold	33.139°N 130.894°E	Hita, Ōita		1896	1972	now museum
Bajo mine	Gold	33.481°N 131.517°E	Bungotakada, Ōita		?	?	
Yakushima mine	Gold	30.359°N 130.529°E	Yakushima		?	1958	leading tungsten producer
Iwato mine	Gold	31.277°N 130.326°E	Makurazaki, Kagoshima		?	?	
Onoyama mine	Gold	31.938°N 130.731°E	Yūsui, Kagoshima		?	?	
Akeshi mine	Gold	31.31°N 130.379°E	Minamikyūshū, Kagoshima		?	198x	closed
Kasuga mine	Gold	31.266°N 130.275°E	Makurazaki, Kagoshima		?	open	silica with gold as by-product
Kushikino mine	Gold	31.754°N 130.3°E	Kushikino, Kagoshima	Mitsui mining	195#	closed	
Yamagano mine	Gold	31.919°N 130.617°E	Kirishima, Kagoshima		1642	1965	
Hishikari mine	Gold	31.992°N 130.708°E	Yūsui, Kagoshima	Sumitomo Metal Mining	1985	open	the only open gold mine of Japan as in 2014
Fuke mine	Gold	32.15°N 130.617°E	Isa, Kagoshima	Toa mining	1937	1976	also nearby Okuchi mine
Sannotake mine	Gold	33.7°N 130.85°E	Tagawa, Fukuoka		?	?	includes Yokozuru mine
Yoshino mine	Gold	38.153°N 140.197°E	Nan'yō, Yamagata		?	1975	
Isobe-Koyama mine	Gold	38.45°N 140.217°E	Sagae, Yamagata		1932	1977	
Oya mine	Gold	38.867°N 141.522°E	Motoyoshi, Miyagi		1915	1971	
Tsunatori mine	Gold	39.304°N 140.942°E	Waga District, Iwate		1908	1962	
Nakase mine	Gold	35.358°N 134.625°E	Yabu, Hyōgo		?	?	
Ōmidani mine	Gold	35.246°N 134.647°E	Shisō, Hyōgo		1961	1983	
Takeno mine	Gold	35.611°N 134.736°E	Kinosaki, Hyōgo		?	?	
Asahi mine	Gold	34.902°N 134.314°E	Asago, Hyōgo		1921	1985	
Nebazawa mine	Gold	36.871°N 139.322°E	Katashina, Gunma		1961	1982	
Iwami Ginzan Silver Mine	Gold	35.164°N 132.442°E	Ōda, Shimane		130#	1923	world leading medieval silver producer
Tsumo mine	Gold	34.65°N 131.986°E	Masuda, Shimane		1950x	?	
Seikoshi mine	Gold	34.9°N 138.827°E	Toi, Shizuoka		1935	1983	
Kawazu mine	Gold	34.699°N 138.922°E	Shimoda, Shizuoka		1915	1959	
Yugashima mine	Gold	34.881°N 138.914°E	Amagiyugashima, Shizuoka		1939	1958	
Mochikoshi mine	Gold	34.876°N 138.864°E	Amagiyugashima, Shizuoka		1929	1952	
Sado mine	Gold	38.038°N 138.261°E	Sado, Niigata		1601	1974	
Togi mine	Gold	37.144°N 136.783°E	Shika, Ishikawa	Mitsubishi Metal Mining	1906	1942	
Mumaya mine	Gold	36.067°N 137.024°E	Shōkawa, Gifu		159#	?	
Tsugu mine	Gold	35.178°N 137.629°E	Shitara, Aichi		15##	1956	
Kamaishi mine	Gold	39.3°N 141.683°E	Kamaishi, Iwate		1727	1993	Dominant iron producer of Japan pre-war
Nishizawa mine	Gold	36.869°N 139.498°E	Nikkō, Tochigi		1928	?	
Chitose mine	Gold	42.725°N 141.217°E	Chitose, Hokkaido		1936	1974	
Hokuryu mine	Gold	44.542°N 142.817°E	Monbetsu, Hokkaido		?	1943	
Konomai gold mine	Gold	44.135°N 143.349°E	Monbetsu, Hokkaido		1917	1973	
Horobetsu mine	Gold	42.475°N 141.05°E	Noboribetsu, Hokkaido		1898	1973	
Sanru mine	Gold	44.383°N 142.642°E	Shimokawa, Hokkaido		1926	1983	
Kitanoo mine	Gold	43.925°N 143.569°E	Kitami, Hokkaido		1924	1943	
Teine mine	Gold	43.092°N 141.203°E	Sapporo, Hokkaido		1941	1971	
Shizukari Mine	Gold	42.6°N 140.458°E	Shiribeshi, Hokkaido		1918	1962	
Ponshikaribetsu mine	Gold	43.184°N 140.786°E	Shiribeshi, Hokkaido		1891	open	
Todoroki mine	Gold	43.008°N 140.925°E	Shiribeshi, Hokkaido		1903	1974	
Toi gold mine	Gold	34.908°N 138.793°E	Toi	Sumitomo Group	1370	1965	
Kōryū Mine	Gold	42.793°N 141.286°E	Eniwa, Hokkaido		1935	1943	
Amou mine	Gold	36.234°N 136.954°E	Shirakawa, Gifu (village)		?	closed	large gold deposit
Sennotani mine	Graphite	36.71°N 137.167°E	Toyama, Toyama		?	1967	85% of graphite producer of Japan in 1951
Amou mine	Graphite	36.234°N 136.954°E	Shirakawa, Gifu (village)		?	closed	Leading graphite producer of Japan
Toyoha mine	Indium	42.98°N 141.041°E	Sapporo, Hokkaido		?	2006	World leading indium producer until exhausted
Kunimiyama mine	Iron	33.631°N 133.419°E	Kōchi, Kōchi		?	closed	
Sannotake mine	Iron	33.7°N 130.85°E	Tagawa, Fukuoka		?	?	includes Yokozuru mine
Kabasawa mine	Iron	38.326°N 140.728°E	Aoba-ku, Sendai		?	?	
Matsuo mine	Iron	39.933°N 140.933°E	Matsuo, Iwate		1914	1971	important iron and sulphur producer
Sennin mine	Iron	39.311°N 140.889°E	Waga District, Iwate		1911	1974	also called Wagasennin mine
Gunma-tetsuzan	Iron	36.653°N 138.597°E	Nakanojō, Gunma		1943	1975	
Akatani mine	Iron	37.808°N 139.492°E	Shibata, Niigata		1925	1975	
Suwa mine	Iron	36.044°N 138.275°E	Chino, Nagano		?	195#	
Akagane mine	Iron	39.167°N 141.333°E	Esashi, Iwate		1912	1974	
Kamaishi mine	Iron	39.3°N 141.683°E	Kamaishi, Iwate		1727	1993	Dominant iron producer of Japan pre-war
Shojingawa mine	Iron	41.895°N 140.699°E	Nanae, Hokkaido		1897	1960	
Kutchan mine	Iron	42.91°N 140.778°E	Shiribeshi, Hokkaido		?	?	Dominant iron producer of Japan during Pacific War
Taishu mine	Kaolinite	34.221°N 129.219°E	Tsushima Island		699	open	initially mined for silver, later switched for kaolinite
Sarayama mine	Kaolinite	32.358°N 130.033°E	Amakusa		?	open	
Itaya mine	Kaolinite	37.772°N 140.25°E	Yonezawa, Yamagata		?	?	paper-clay
Hiraki mine	Kaolinite	34.958°N 135.1°E	Sanda, Hyōgo		?	open	High purity, used for fiber optics
Hattori-Kawai mine	Kaolinite	36.393°N 136.597°E	Nomi, Ishikawa and Hakusan, Ishikawa		1930	open	Hattori mine in Nomi closed in 2001
Shakanai mine	Lead	40.308°N 140.578°E	Ōdate, Akita	Dowa Holdings	?	?	also contains Germanium, Indium and Gold
Kosaka mine	Lead	40.337°N 140.754°E	Kosaka, Akita	Dowa Holdings	18##	?	
Hanaoka mine	Lead	40.309°N 140.552°E	Ōdate, Akita	Kajima, Dowa mining	1885	?	the site of Hanaoka Incident during WWII
Mitate mine	Lead	32.775°N 131.472°E	Hinokage, Miyazaki	Rasa Industries	1915	1970	on slopes of Mount Sobo
Ohori mine	Lead	38.746°N 140.464°E	Mogami, Yamagata		?	?	
Yatani mine	Lead	37.775°N 140.017°E	Yonezawa, Yamagata		?	?	also some gold and silver
Ōizumi mine	Lead	38.413°N 139.728°E	Tsuruoka, Yamagata		1882	1950	
Nissho mine	Lead	38.992°N 140.242°E	Mamurogawa, Yamagata		1937	1963	
Hosokura mine	Lead	38.808°N 140.9°E	Kurihara, Miyagi		1898	1977	now become an amusement park
Hanawa 2 mine	Lead	40.176°N 140.867°E	Hachimantai, Iwate		?	?	not to be confused with Hanawa manganese mine in Miyako, Iwate
Taro mine	Lead	39.758°N 141.933°E	Miyako, Iwate		1936	1979	reused for Cosmic-ray observatory of Meisei University
Tsumo mine	Lead	34.65°N 131.986°E	Masuda, Shimane		195x	?	
Wanibuchi mine	Lead	35.417°N 132.75°E	Izumo, Shimane		?	?	also important gypsum producer
Nanetsu mine	Lead	37.094°N 139.042°E	Muika, Niigata		1963	1971	
Asahi-budo mine	Lead	38.4°N 139.561°E	Murakami, Niigata		1941	1957	
Otani mine	Lead	37.75°N 139.413°E	Mikawa, Niigata		1632	1961	
Hatasa mine	Lead	35.852°N 137.063°E	Gujō, Gifu		1674	1916	
Ohinata mine	Lead	36.167°N 138.483°E	Sakuho, Nagano		?	?	Closed
Nakatatsu mine	Lead	35.873°N 136.578°E	Ōno, Fukui		?	?	Closed
Toyoha mine	Lead	42.98°N 141.041°E	Sapporo, Hokkaido		?	2006	World leading indium producer until exhausted
Obira mine	Lead	32.842°N 131.578°E	mount Sobo in Nishiusuki, Miyazaki		1617	1954	
Inaushi mine	Lead	43.242°N 143.722°E	Kitami, Hokkaido		1934	1964	
Yoichi Mine	Lead	43.217°N 140.7°E	Shakotan Peninsula, Hokkaido		?	1963	
Suttsu mine	Lead	42.772°N 140.293°E	Suttsu District, Hokkaido		?	1962	
Nagatare mine	Lithium	33.583°N 130.283°E	Fukuoka, Fukuoka		?	?	
Ananai mine	Manganese	33.692°N 133.647°E	Nankoku, Kōchi		?	closed	
Kunimiyama mine	Manganese	33.631°N 133.419°E	Kōchi, Kōchi		?	closed	
Kurase mine	Manganese	33.8°N 133.033°E	Saijō, Ehime		?	?	
Ōizumi mine	Manganese	38.413°N 139.728°E	Tsuruoka, Yamagata		1882	1950	
Tanohata mine	Manganese	39.917°N 141.9°E	Tanohata, Iwate		?	?	a type location for a number of rare minerals
Hanawa mine	Manganese	39.641°N 141.957°E	Miyako, Iwate		?	?	closed
Noda-Tamagawa mine	Manganese	40.073°N 141.808°E	Noda, Iwate		1950	?	
Shiromaru mine	Manganese	35.808°N 139.125°E	Okutama, Tokyo		?	?	now submerged, also called Hakumaru mine
Kaso mine	Manganese	36.604°N 139.633°E	Kanuma, Tochigi		1947	?	
Ōkura mine	Manganese	36.856°N 139.328°E	Hannō, Saitama		1941	1945	
Shōwa mine	Manganese	36.551°N 139.308°E	Kiryū, Gunma		?	?	closed
Hamayokogawa mine	Manganese	35.973°N 137.9°E	Kamiina District, Nagano		1925	1966	large deposits
Searashi mine	Manganese	37.116°N 136.88°E	Nanao, Ishikawa		?	?	
Fujii mine	Manganese	35.533°N 135.85°E	Wakasa, Fukui		?	?	
Taguchi mine	Manganese	35.119°N 137.546°E	Shitara, Aichi		?	?	also Pyroxmangite gems
Obira mine	Manganese	32.842°N 131.578°E	mount Sobo in Nishiusuki, Miyazaki		1617	1954	
Jokoku mine	Manganese	41.667°N 140.053°E	Kaminokuni, Hokkaido		?	?	Dominant manganese producer of Japan
Inakuraishi mine	Manganese	43.15°N 140.633°E	Furubira, Hokkaido		1946	open	Largest manganese deposit in Japan
Ryūshōden mine	Mercury	44.312°N 143.321°E	Monbetsu, Hokkaido		1943	1974	
Tosakubo mine	Mercury	33.8°N 133.95°E	Monobe, Kōchi		?	?	
Ikadazu mine	Mercury	33.832°N 133.383°E	Niihama, Ehime		?	1973	
Itomuka mine	Mercury	43.683°N 143.167°E	Tokoro, Hokkaido		1941	1974	dominant mercury producer of Japan
Seikyu Mine	Molybdenum	35.288°N 132.989°E	Daitō, Shimane		1954	1966	
Daito Mine	Molybdenum	35.296°N 132.978°E	Daitō, Shimane		1950	1966	
Hirase Mine	Molybdenum	36.171°N 136.917°E	Shirakawa, Gifu		1931	1979	
Komaki Mine	Molybdenum	35.086°N 132.997°E	Okuizumo, Shimane		1943	1984	
Ōkawame mine	Molybdenum	40.19°N 141.776°E	Kuji, Iwate		1943	1965	
Chiyogahara mine	Nickel	38.867°N 141.35°E	Fujisawa, Iwate		?	?	
Kamogawa mine	Nickel	35.117°N 139.833°E	Awa District, Chiba		1935	?	also called Kameoka mine
Tenryū mine	Nickel	35.283°N 137.85°E	Tenryū, Nagano		?	open	
Wakasa mine	Nickel	35.483°N 135.617°E	Ōi, Fukui	Mori Kogyo	?	Open	also silica mining
Yamanoyoshida mine	Nickel	34.833°N 137.5°E	Shinshiro, Aichi		?	?	
Kamikawa mine	Nickel	43.848°N 142.77°E	Kamikawa, Hokkaido		1941	1945	
Otanibira quarry	Silica	30.791°N 130.305°E	Iōjima (Kagoshima)		?	1997	initially mined for sulphur
Motoyasu mine	Silver	33.796°N 133.253°E	Saijō, Ehime		1877	1972	
Taio mine	Silver	33.139°N 130.894°E	Hita, Ōita		1896	1972	now museum
Bajo mine	Silver	33.481°N 131.517°E	Bungotakada, Ōita		?	?	
Taishu mine	Silver	34.221°N 129.219°E	Tsushima Island		699	open	initially mined for silver, later switched for kaolinite
Iwato mine	Silver	31.277°N 130.326°E	Makurazaki, Kagoshima		?	?	
Kushikino mine	Silver	31.754°N 130.3°E	Kushikino, Kagoshima	Mitsui mining	195#	closed	
Yamagano mine	Silver	31.919°N 130.617°E	Kirishima, Kagoshima		1642	1965	
Fuke mine	Silver	32.15°N 130.617°E	Isa, Kagoshima	Toa mining	1937	1976	also nearby Okuchi mine
Yoshino mine	Silver	38.153°N 140.197°E	Nan'yō, Yamagata		?	1975	
Oya mine	Silver	38.867°N 141.522°E	Motoyoshi, Miyagi		1915	1971	
Hosokura mine	Silver	38.808°N 140.9°E	Kurihara, Miyagi		1898	1977	now become an amusement park
Nebazawa mine	Silver	36.871°N 139.322°E	Katashina, Gunma		1961	1982	
Tsunatori mine	Silver	39.304°N 140.942°E	Waga District, Iwate		1908	1962	
Ōmidani mine	Silver	35.246°N 134.647°E	Shisō, Hyōgo		1961	1983	
Takeno mine	Silver	35.611°N 134.736°E	Kinosaki, Hyōgo		?	?	
Tada mine	Silver	34.893°N 135.358°E	Inagawa, Hyōgo	Nihon Kogyo	1211	1973	
Asahi mine	Silver	34.902°N 134.314°E	Asago, Hyōgo		1921	1985	
Tochigi mine	Silver	36.794°N 139.814°E	Shioya, Tochigi		1946	1965	
Iwami Ginzan Silver Mine	Silver	35.164°N 132.442°E	Ōda, Shimane		130#	1923	world leading medieval silver producer
Seikoshi mine	Silver	34.9°N 138.827°E	Toi, Shizuoka		1935	1983	
Yugashima mine	Silver	34.881°N 138.914°E	Amagiyugashima, Shizuoka		1939	1958	
Mochikoshi mine	Silver	34.876°N 138.864°E	Amagiyugashima, Shizuoka		1929	1952	
Sado mine	Silver	38.038°N 138.261°E	Sado, Niigata		1601	1974	
Togi mine	Silver	37.144°N 136.783°E	Shika, Ishikawa	Mitsubishi Metal Mining	1906	1942	
Hatasa mine	Silver	35.852°N 137.063°E	Gujō, Gifu		1674	1916	
Kamaishi mine	Silver	39.3°N 141.683°E	Kamaishi, Iwate		1727	1993	Dominant iron producer of Japan pre-war
Toyoha mine	Silver	42.98°N 141.041°E	Sapporo, Hokkaido		?	2006	World leading indium producer until exhausted
Nishizawa mine	Silver	36.869°N 139.498°E	Nikkō, Tochigi		1928	?	
Ikuno mine	Silver	35.167°N 134.825°E	Asago, Hyōgo		807	1973	
Chitose mine	Silver	42.725°N 141.217°E	Chitose, Hokkaido		1936	1974	
Hokuryu mine	Silver	44.542°N 142.817°E	Monbetsu, Hokkaido		?	1943	
Konomai mines	Silver	44.135°N 143.349°E	Monbetsu, Hokkaido		1917	1973	important silver producer of Japan
Horobetsu mine	Silver	42.475°N 141.05°E	Noboribetsu, Hokkaido		1898	1973	
Sanru mine	Silver	44.383°N 142.642°E	Shimokawa, Hokkaido		1926	1983	
Kitanoo mine	Silver	43.925°N 143.569°E	Kitami, Hokkaido		1924	1943	
Shizukari Mine	Silver	42.6°N 140.458°E	Shiribeshi, Hokkaido		1918	1962	
Suttsu mine	Silver	42.772°N 140.293°E	Suttsu District, Hokkaido		?	1962	
Kōryū Mine	Silver	42.793°N 141.286°E	Eniwa, Hokkaido		1935	1943	
Nonowaki mine	Sulphur	33.9°N 134.247°E	Naka, Tokushima		?	196#	
Shirataki mine	Sulphur	33.828°N 133.472°E	Ōkawa, Kōchi	Nippon Mining Co	?	?	
Shingu mine	Sulphur	33.933°N 133.633°E	Shikokuchūō, Ehime		1911	1975	also diamond-bearing Lherzolite
Ōkuki mine	Sulphur	33.514°N 132.656°E	Uchiko, Ehime		?	?	
Suzuyama mine	Sulphur	31.49°N 130.45°E	Kagoshima, Kagoshima		184x	closed	water treatment plant still active
Taro mine	Sulphur	39.758°N 141.933°E	Miyako, Iwate		1936	1979	reused for Cosmic-ray observatory of Meisei University
Matsuo mine	Sulphur	39.933°N 140.933°E	Matsuo, Iwate		1914	1971	important iron and sulphur producer
Yanahara mine	Sulphur	34.958°N 134.069°E	Misaki, Okayama		195#	1970	also produced iron oxide for audio tapes
Horobetsu sulphur mine	Sulphur	42.565°N 140.976°E	Sōbetsu, Hokkaido		1940	1959	
Kobui mine	Sulphur	41.767°N 140.733°E	Hakodate, Hokkaido		1904	1952	
Shojingawa mine	Sulphur	41.895°N 140.699°E	Nanae, Hokkaido		1938	1960	
Shiretoko mine	Sulphur	44.133°N 145.161°E	Shiretoko Peninsula, Hokkaido		1937	?	deposit created in volcanic eruption of 1936
Akan mine	Sulphur	43.452°N 144.099°E	Ashoro, Hokkaido		1951	open	
Kiura mine	Tin	32.8°N 131.55°E	Saiki, Ōita		16##	?	also mined for emery
Obira mine	Tin	32.842°N 131.578°E	Bungo-ōno, Oita		?	?	also contains boron and fluorine minerals
Hoei mine	Tin	32.859°N 131.453°E	Bungo-ōno, Oita		?	closed	
Yakushima mine	Tin	30.359°N 130.529°E	Yakushima		?	1958	leading tungsten producer
Mitate mine	Tin	32.775°N 131.472°E	Hinokage, Miyazaki	Rasa Industries	1915	1970	on slopes of Mount Sobo
Suzuyama mine	Tin	31.49°N 130.45°E	Kagoshima, Kagoshima		184x	closed	water treatment plant still active
Tada mine	Tin	34.893°N 135.358°E	Inagawa, Hyōgo	Nihon Kogyo	1211	1973	
Akenobe mine	Tin	35.283°N 134.667°E	Yabu, Hyōgo		1908	1987	dominant tin producer of Japan
Obira mine	Tin	32.842°N 131.578°E	mount Sobo in Nishiusuki, Miyazaki		1617	1954	
Kabasawa mine	Titanium	38.326°N 140.728°E	Aoba-ku, Sendai		?	?	
Yakushima mine	Tungsten	30.359°N 130.529°E	Yakushima		?	1958	leading tungsten producer
Takatori mine	Tungsten	36.5°N 140.294°E	Shirosato, Ibaraki		?	?	also Rhodochrosite gems
Kuga mine	Tungsten	34.217°N 132.025°E	Iwakuni, Yamaguchi		?	?	
Fujigatani mine	Tungsten	34.144°N 132.017°E	Iwakuni, Yamaguchi		1955	1977	closed
Tsumo mine	Tungsten	34.65°N 131.986°E	Masuda, Shimane		195x	?	
Fukuoka mine	Tungsten	35.586°N 137.468°E	Nakatsugawa, Gifu	Furukawa	?	?	Closed
Komaki Mine	Tungsten	35.086°N 132.997°E	Okuizumo, Shimane		1911	1984	
Akenobe mine	Tungsten	35.283°N 134.667°E	Yabu, Hyōgo		1908	1987	
Otani mine	Tungsten	35.033°N 135.517°E	Kameoka, Kyoto		1912	1983	
Yaguki mine	Tungsten	37.171°N 140.915°E	Iwaki, Fukushima		1945	1974	
Ningyo-toge mine	Uranium	35.308°N 133.933°E	Kagamino, Okayama		1969	1982	dominant uranium producer of Japan
Tono mine	Uranium	35.408°N 137.233°E	Mizunami, Gifu		2001	open	
Kosaka mine	Zinc	40.337°N 140.754°E	Kosaka, Akita	Dowa Holdings	18##	?	
Shakanai mine	Zinc	40.308°N 140.578°E	Ōdate, Akita	Dowa Holdings	?	?	also contains Germanium, Indium and Gold
Hanaoka mine	Zinc	40.309°N 140.552°E	Ōdate, Akita	Kajima, Dowa mining	1885	?	the site of Hanaoka Incident during WWII
Obira mine	Zinc	32.842°N 131.578°E	Bungo-ōno, Oita		?	?	also contains boron and fluorine minerals
Mitate mine	Zinc	32.775°N 131.472°E	Hinokage, Miyazaki	Rasa Industries	1915	1970	on slopes of Mount Sobo
Ohori mine	Zinc	38.746°N 140.464°E	Mogami, Yamagata		?	?	
Yatani mine	Zinc	37.775°N 140.017°E	Yonezawa, Yamagata		?	?	also some gold and silver
Yoshino mine	Zinc	38.153°N 140.197°E	Nan'yō, Yamagata		?	1975	
Ōizumi mine	Zinc	38.413°N 139.728°E	Tsuruoka, Yamagata		1882	1950	
Nissho mine	Zinc	38.992°N 140.242°E	Mamurogawa, Yamagata		1937	1963	
Yaso mine	Zinc	37.058°N 139.658°E	Minamiaizu, Fukushima		1952	1970	
Hosokura mine	Zinc	38.808°N 140.9°E	Kurihara, Miyagi		1898	1977	now become an amusement park
Hanawa 2 mine	Zinc	40.176°N 140.867°E	Hachimantai, Iwate		?	?	not to be confused with Hanawa manganese mine in Miyako, Iwate
Taro mine	Zinc	39.758°N 141.933°E	Miyako, Iwate		1936	1979	reused for Cosmic-ray observatory of Meisei University
Kidogasawa mine	Zinc	36.797°N 139.7°E	Nikkō, Tochigi		1940	1974	
Tsumo mine	Zinc	34.65°N 131.986°E	Masuda, Shimane		195x	?	
Wanibuchi mine	Zinc	35.417°N 132.75°E	Izumo, Shimane		?	?	also important gypsum producer
Takara mine	Zinc	35.575°N 138.85°E	Tsuru, Yamanashi		1942	1962	also produced pyrite
Nanetsu mine	Zinc	37.094°N 139.042°E	Muika, Niigata		1963	1971	
Asahi-budo mine	Zinc	38.4°N 139.561°E	Murakami, Niigata		1941	1957	
Otani mine	Zinc	37.75°N 139.413°E	Mikawa, Niigata		1632	1961	
Ohinata mine	Zinc	36.167°N 138.483°E	Sakuho, Nagano		?	?	Closed
Kamioka mine	Zinc	36.34°N 137.33°E	Hida, Gifu		?	2002	Used to be leading Asian zinc mine until re-used for Super-Kamiokande neutrino observatory.
Hatasa mine	Zinc	35.852°N 137.063°E	Gujō, Gifu		1674	1916	
Nakatatsu mine	Zinc	35.873°N 136.578°E	Ōno, Fukui		?	?	Closed
Toyoha mine	Zinc	42.98°N 141.041°E	Sapporo, Hokkaido		?	2006	World leading indium producer until exhausted
Inaushi mine	Zinc	43.242°N 143.722°E	Kitami, Hokkaido		1934	1964	
Yoichi Mine	Zinc	43.217°N 140.7°E	Shakotan Peninsula, Hokkaido		?	1963	
Suttsu mine	Zinc	42.772°N 140.293°E	Suttsu District, Hokkaido		?	1962	
Akenobe mine	Zinc	35.283°N 134.667°E	Yabu, Hyōgo		1908	1987	
