= Utara =

Utara is the Malay word for north and can be found in topography. It is a loanword from the Sanskrit उत्तर, uttara (cf. Hindi उत्तर and Urdu اتر, uttar) which is also frequently found in topographic names, including the Indian states of Uttar Pradesh and Uttarakhand.

E.g.

- Sulawesi Utara -> North Sulawesi
- Sumatera Utara -> North Sumatra
- Maluku Utara -> North Maluku
- Miscellaneous:
  - Utara Coal Mine
  - Utara University, Malaysia
  - Laluan MRT Utara Selatan, Singapore
  - Lebuhraya Utara-Selatan, Singapore

== See also ==
- Uttara (disambiguation)
- Uttar (disambiguation)
