= Curt Netto =

German metallurgist and educator (1847–1909)

- Born: August 21, 1847; Freiberg Kingdom of Saxony
- Died: February 7, 1909 (aged 61); Frankfurt am Main, Germany
- Occupations: metallurgist, educator

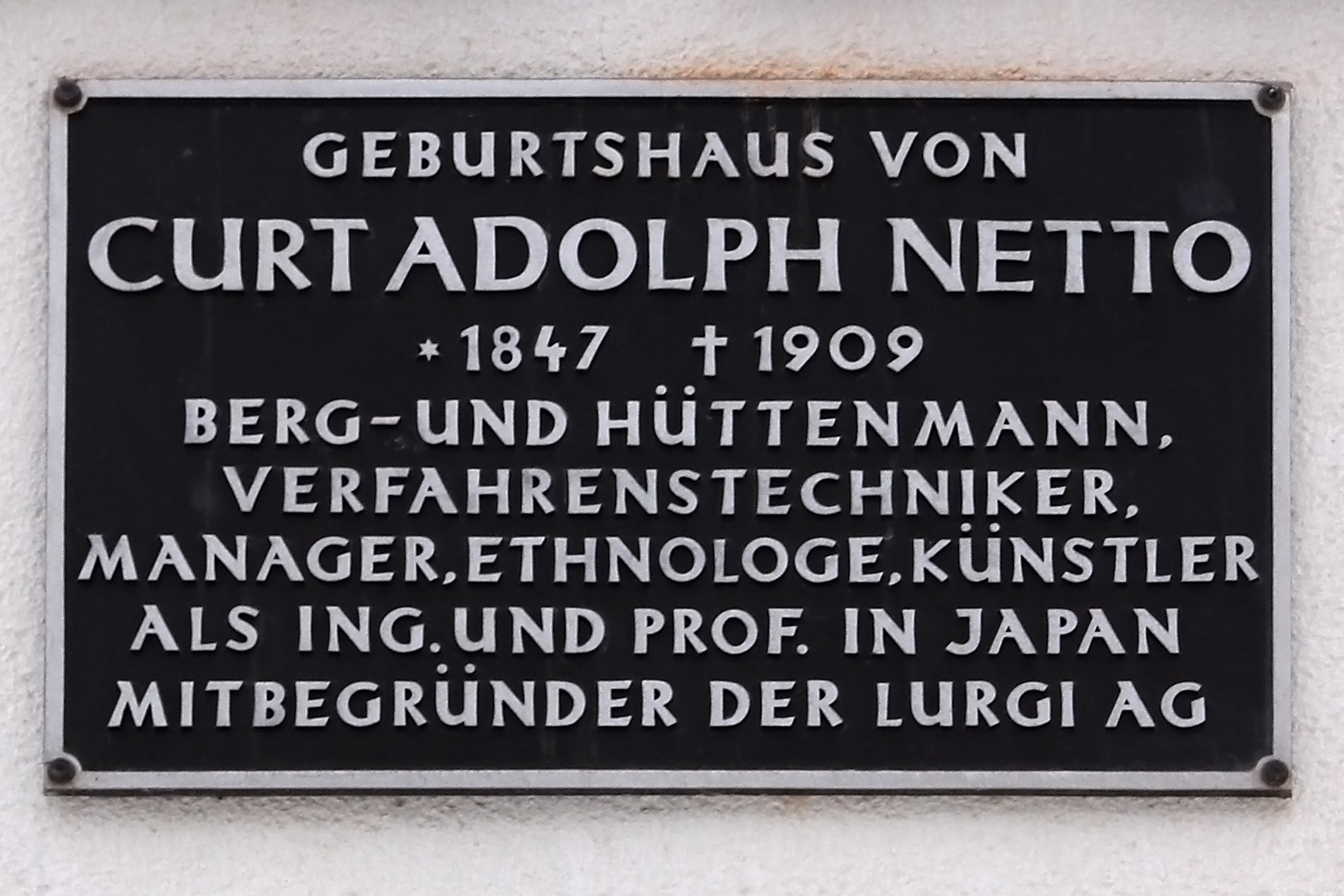
Plaque marking site of Netto's birth

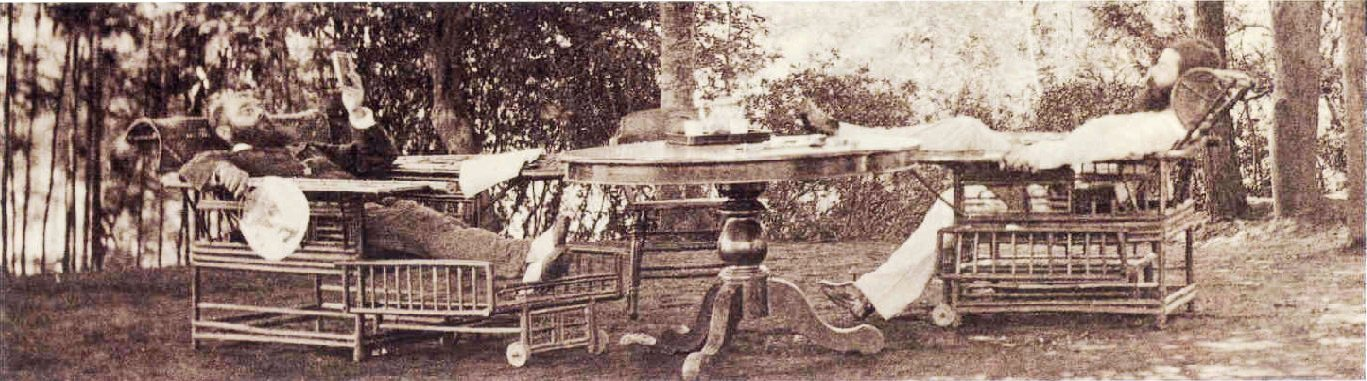
Curt Netto (right) and the physician Erwin Bälz in Japan

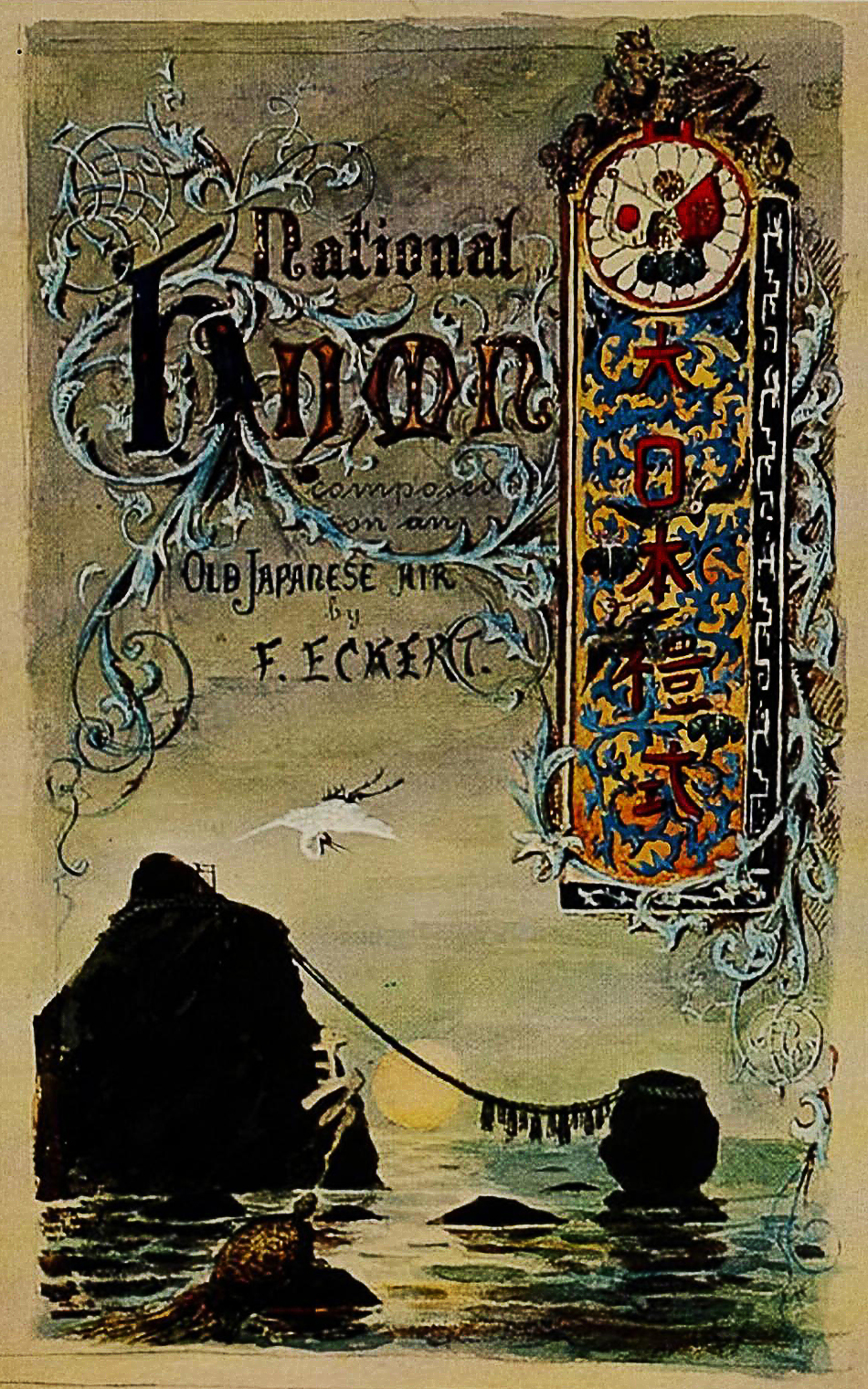
Cover for Franz Eckert's notes of the new national anthem. Designed by Netto in 1880.

Curt Adolph Netto (August 21, 1847 – February 7, 1909) was a German metallurgist and educator. He is regarded as a precursor for the industrial utilization of aluminium. He was active in early Meiji period Japan.

== Biography ==
Netto was born in Freiberg, Saxony, where his father, Gustav Adolph Netto was a mining official. As a youth, he relocated with his family to Schneeberg, Saxony, but returned to Freiberg by 1860. He enrolled in the Freiberg University of Mining and Technology in 1864. He left school in 1869, and volunteered for the military, joining the mountain troops corps. He saw combat in the Franco-Prussian War of 1870–1871, and was decorated with the Iron Cross (second class). After the war, in 1871, he obtained a job as a chemist working with enamels at the workshop of Ernst August Geitner. In 1873, he was recruited by the Japanese government as a foreign advisor and was placed in charge of modernizing the Kosaka mines, a lead, copper and zinc mine at Kosaka, Akita in northern Honshu. He was one of the co-founders of the German Society of Natural History and Ethnology of Asia (Deutsche Gesellschaft für Natur- und Völkerkunde Ostasiens).

The mines were privatized in 1877, and Netto travelled to Tokyo, where he obtained a job as a lecturer on metallurgy at Tokyo Imperial University in 1878. He took a one-year sabbatical leave from 1882 to 1883 for research in Europe, Mexico and the United States. In June 1885, Emperor Meiji conferred upon him the Order of the Rising Sun. Netto's contract with Tokyo Imperial University expired in November 1885, and he returned to Germany in 1886. However, soon after his return, he was forced to sell much of his large collection of Japanese ukiyo-e woodblock prints as he lost all of his savings in a bank failure.

After briefly working in Paris, Netto obtained a job with Krupp from 1887–1889, where he invented a new patented process to produce aluminium by the sodium reduction of cryolite. The revolutionary new process promised to drastically reduce production costs for aluminium, which until that point had been valued more highly than gold due to its scarcity and difficulty to produce. However, Netto's process was quickly rendered obsolete by the development of electrolysis smelting. In 1889, on the recommendation of noted chemist Clemens Winkler, Netto accepted a post as head of the technical department of Metallgesellschaft in Frankfurt am Main.

Netto married in 1899 and had three children. He retired in 1902 for health reasons and from 1906 resided at the spa resort of Bad Nauheim in Hesse. He died February 7, 1909, in Frankfurt.

== Publications ==
Netto published two books from his experiences in Japan:

- Papierschmetterlinge aus Japan (Paper Butterflies from Japan). Leipzig: Weigel 1888. (According to Basil Hall Chamberlain the "liveliest and best of all popular books on Japan".)
- Japanischer Humor, 1901
