= Hanaoka mine =

Open-pit mine in Japan

- Location within Akita Prefecture Location within Japan
- Location: Akita Prefecture, Japan; 40°18′33″N 140°33′07″E
- Products: gold, silver, copper, Lead, Zinc
- Opened: 1885
- Company: Dowa Holdings

The Hanaoka mine (花岡鉱山, Hanaoka Kōzan) was an open-pit mine with major deposits of "black ore" (sphalerite and galena, a mixture of zinc, lead, gold, silver, and other precious metals), in the village of Hanaoka, Kitaakita District, Akita Prefecture in the Tōhoku region of northern Japan in. The area is now part of the city of Ōdate.

== History ==
Mining began in 1885, with the mine under the control of what later became the Kajima Corporation. New deposits were discovered and exploited through the use of new technologies in the 1960s and 1970s, but by 1994, the mine was deemed to be no longer profitable, and operations were discontinued.

Dowa Holdings and several of its subsidiary companies now control the site, and operate various waste management, recycling, landfill, and soil reclamation projects. Incinerator ash contaminated with radioactive cesium created by the burning of debris from the Fukushima Daiichi nuclear disaster is also stored at the site.

=== Hanaoka POW camp ===
During World War II, a prisoner-of-war camp was established at Hanaoka Mine on December 1, 1944. The prisoners included Dutch captured in the Dutch East Indies, and many Americans and Australians after mid-May 1945. The civilians at the camp had been captured after the Battle of Wake Island, and were survivors of the Woosung POW Camp near Shanghai. They had been sent to Tokyo 2D and 5B Kawasaki Shipyards in Yokohama on the Nitta Maru before being sent to Hanaoka. Many Americans at Hanaoka came from POW camps in Taiwan on the Melbourne Maru, and the Australians had previously been at the Naoetsu POW camp in Niigata Prefecture. The Allied POWs were assigned to the Fujita-gumi Construction Company as slave laborers, in violation of the Geneva Conventions. Despite the dangerous working conditions, only six prisoners died at the camp; one was killed by being crushed by a barrel of food and relief supplies dropped on the camp by an American aircraft. The camp, with its remaining 245 American and 45 Australian POWs, was liberated on September 15, 1945.

=== Hanaoka mine incident ===
During World War II, from August 1944, 986 Chinese laborers forcibly conscripted by the Imperial Japanese Army were brought to Japan, and assigned to the Hanaoka Mine to build a canal. Laboring under inhumane conditions, with inadequate food, and without the monetary compensation which had been promised, the workers rioted on June 30, 1945. Five of the Japanese supervisors were killed, and 113 Chinese workers were killed by the Japanese police and military in the suppression of the riot. In October 1945, the American occupation authorities began an investigation into the incident, finding that 418 Chinese laborers (including the 113 who had died in the insurrection) had perished at Hanaoka, a far higher percentage than at other forced labor camps in Japan. Three of the Kashima-gumi supervisors were found guilty of Class B and C war crimes and were sentenced to death; another was sentenced to life imprisonment, and two Japanese policemen were sentenced to 20 years imprisonment. Kashima constructed a memorial to the Chinese workers who had perished in October 1949 at a local Buddhist temple, and the remains were repatriated to China from 1953 to 1964.

On December 22, 1984, a group of survivors issued an open letter demanding a public apology from Kajima Corporation, the establishment of a memorial museum, and financial compensation. Kajima responded positively to the first two requests, but when negotiations collapsed on the question of compensation, a group of survivors and next-of-kin, together with Japanese activist lawyers, filed a lawsuit with the Tokyo District Court demanding a total of 60.5 million yen in compensation on June 28, 1995. The Tokyo District Court rejected the suit, on the grounds that the statute of limitations had been exceeded. This ruling was appealed to the Tokyo High Court on December 12, 1995. Increasingly acrimonious hearings, with the Chinese government constantly escalating the demands of the defendants, took place, until a compromise proposal by the Tokyo High Court of 500 million yen to be shared by the survivors and their next-of-kin was accepted by the Red Cross Society of China on behalf of the defendants on May 31, 2000. Final settlement was made by Kajima by November 29, 2000. The ruling was hailed in the press as a precedent for future compensation claims against Japanese companies for the war-time atrocities perpetrated by their predecessors.
