= Kazuno District, Akita =

District in Akita prefecture, Japan

Coordinates: 40.429°N 140.796°E

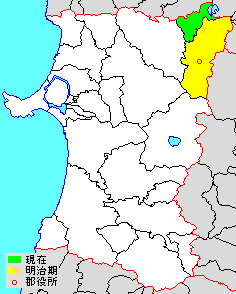
Location of Kazuno District in Akita Prefecture green - current (Kosaka-machi) yellow - former extent (Kazuno-shi)

Kazuno (鹿角郡, Kazuno-gun) is a rural district located in Akita Prefecture, Japan.

As of October, 2020, the district consists of only the town of Kosaka with an estimated population of 4,780 and an area of 201.95 km^{2} The city of Kazuno was formerly part of Kazuno District.

== Towns and villages ==
- Kosaka

== History ==
The area of Kazuno District was formerly part of Mutsu Province, and came under the new province of Rikuchū Province on January 19, 1869 following the Meiji restoration. At the time, the area consisted of 68 villages formerly under the control of Morioka Domain, which were under military occupation by Hirosaki Domain following the Boshin War. Akita Prefecture was founded on December 13, 1871, and the area was transferred to Akita.

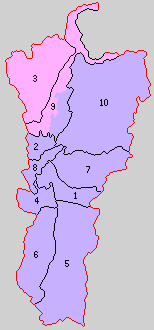
Historic Map of Kazuno District: Purple - Kazuno-shi: 1. Hanawa; 2. Temanai; 4. Osarizawa; 5. Miyakwa; 6. Akebono; 7. Shibuhira; 8. Nishikigi; 9. Nanataki (eastern portion); 10. Ōyu; Pink - Kosaka-machi: 3. Kosaka; 9. Nanataki (western portion)

With the establishment of the municipality system on April 1, 1889, modern Kazuno District, with two towns (Hanawa and Temanai) and 8 villages was established.

- May 12, 1914 - Kosaka was elevated to town status.
- November 1, 1928 - Ōyu was elevated to town status.
- October 1, 1936 - Osarizawa was elevated to town status.
- March 31, 1955 - Temanai was merged with the village of Nishikigi to create the town of Towada.
- September 30, 1956 - Ōyu was absorbed into Towada.
- April 1, 1972 - the towns of Hanawa, Towada and Osarizawa were merged to create the city of Kazuno. Following this merger, Kazuno District was left with only the town of Kosaka.
