= Uttar =

Uttar means north in Hindi and many other Indian languages. It can be found in:

- Uttar Dinajpur, district of West Bengal, India
- Uttarkashi, town in Uttarakhand, India
  - Uttarkashi District
- Uttar Pradesh, state of India
- Uttarakhand, state of India
- Uttara Kannada, district of Karnataka, India
- Uttar, Tank, a union council in Pakistan

== Peoples ==
- Uttar Kumar, Indian film actor

== See also ==
- Uttar (film), a 2025 Marathi-language film
- Uttara (disambiguation)
