= Nanataki Falls =

Coordinates: 40°21′22″N 140°47′01″E

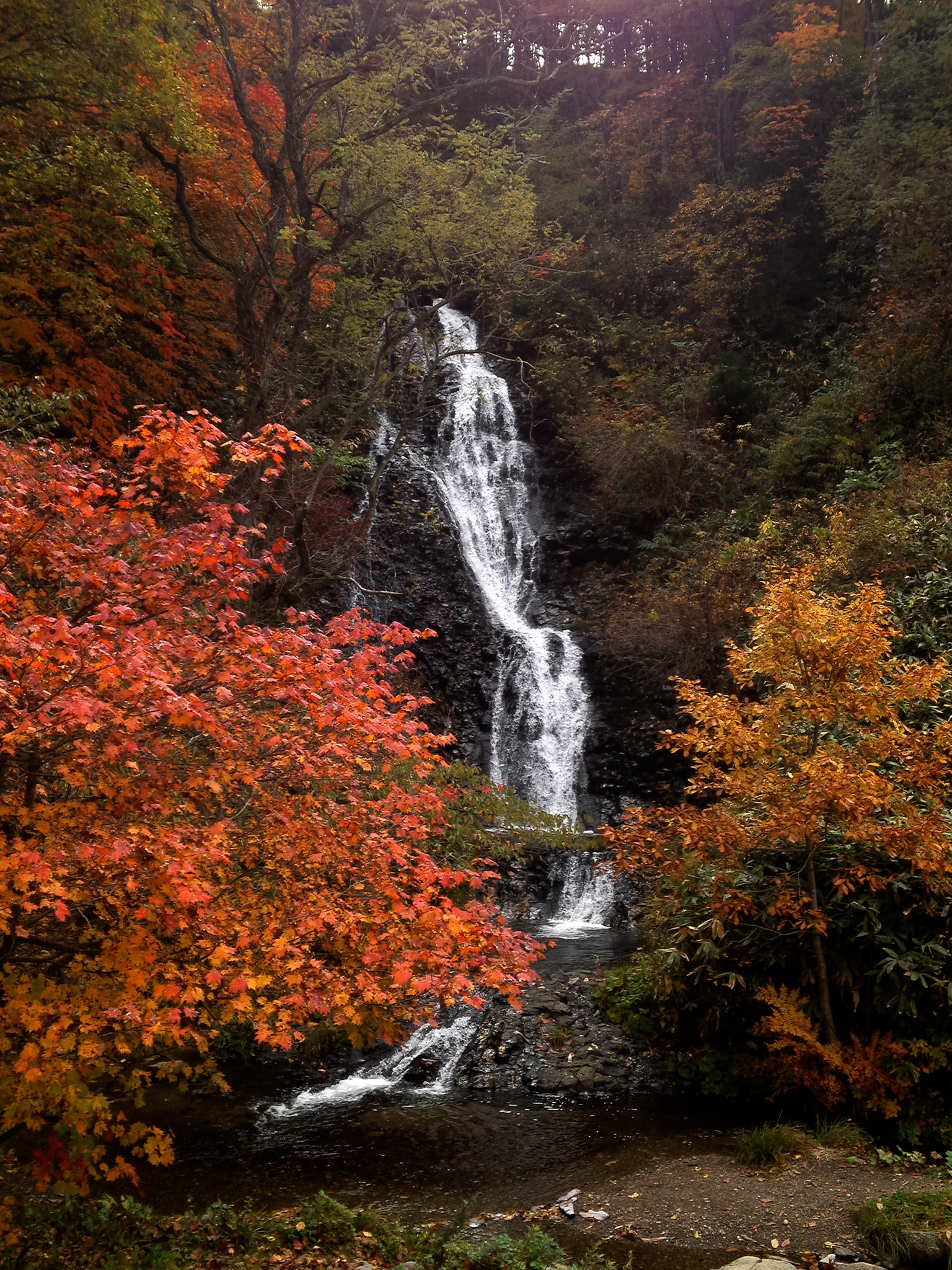
- Location: Kosaka, Akita Prefecture, Japan
- Type: multi-tier
- Total height: 60 m (200 ft)
- Number of drops: 7
- Watercourse: Yoneshiro River

Nanataki Falls (七滝, Nana-taki) is a waterfall in the Hachimantai district of Kosaka, Akita Prefecture, Japan, on the Kosaka branch of the Yoneshiro River. It is one of "Japan’s Top 100 Waterfalls", in a listing published by the Japanese Ministry of the Environment in 1990.

The falls have a height of 60 metres (200 ft), broken into a series of seven cascades. The falls are easily accessible by car, and are located 8 kilometres (5.0 mi) from the Kosaka Interchange on the Tōhoku Expressway.
