= Uttara =

Uttara, which means "north" in Sanskrit and many other South Asian languages, may refer to:

== Places ==
- Uttara, a neighbourhood north of Dhaka, Bangladesh
- Uttara Export Processing Zone, Bangladesh
- Uttara East Thana
- Uttara West Thana
- Uttaradit, a city in Thailand
- Uttara Kannada, a district in Karnataka state
- Uttarakhand, a Himalayan state in North India
- Uttarakuru, a legendary location in ancient Indian texts
- Uttarapatha, a legendary location in ancient Indian texts

== Films ==
- Uttara (film), a 2000 Bengali film
- Uttarayan (film), a 2004 Marathi film
- Uttarayanam, a 1975 Malayalam film

== Transport ==
- Uttara North metro station, a metro station of Dhaka Metro Rail
- Uttara Center metro station, a metro station of Dhaka Metro Rail
- Uttara South metro station, a metro station of Dhaka Metro Rail
- Uttara Depot, a railway depot of Dhaka Metro Rail
- Uttara Express, a mail train run between Rajshahi and Parbatipur

== People ==
- Uttara Baokar, Indian actress

== Other uses ==
- Uttara (Mahabharata), son of King Virata who went into battle with Arjuna
- Uttarā (Mahabharata), daughter of Virata and mother of Parikshita
- Uttara Kanda, last book of the Ramayana
- Uttara Bank, Bangladesh
- Uttara University, Dhaka, Bangladesh
- Uttaradhi Arora, an Arora clan of North India
- Uttaramadra, a legendary clan found in Uttarakuru
- Uttarayana, spring equinox in Hindu traditions

== See also ==
- Utara (disambiguation)
- Uttar (disambiguation)
