= Shimokawa mine =

Shimokawa Mine
- Location within Japan
- Location: Shimokawa, Hokkaido, Hokkaido, Japan; 44°12′54″N 142°42′04″E
- Products: Copper, Cobalt, Zinc, pyrite
- Opened: 1941
- Closed: 1982
- Company: Mitsubishi Corporation

The Shimokawa Copper Mine, Shimokawa, Hokkaido, Japan is a polymetal mine particularly rich in copper. Its main ore minerals were chalcopyrite, pyrrhotite, pyrite and sphalerite.

The ore body was formed at diabase intrusion into the sedimentary slate layer. The formation of ore have started at mid-ocean ridge and was very prolonged, with several zones of different composition attributed to changing ambient conditions are discernible across ore body.

== History ==
Poly-metallic ore deposits on Shimokawa mine site were first surveyed in 1933, and large scale mining have started in 1941. After the construction of railway in 1942, the mine gradually rose in prominence, especially after being designated as strategic resource in 1944, despite the setback of flotation ore enrichment plant been burned down in 1946.

Year	Monthly output, tons
1949	3300
1952	4400
1955	8000
1961	20000
1974	33000
1979	15000
1981	5500

After the removal of copper price controls in 1963, the mine struggled to remain profitable and was eventually closed after prolonged efforts to reduce mining costs, before the exhaustion of the ore body. The Shimokawa mine has stopped mining in 1982 and was shut down in 1983.

During the 42 years of mining, Shimokawa mine have produced 7 million tons of ore with average copper contents of 2.34%.
