= Shakanai mine =

Coordinates: 40.3172°N 140.5727°E

- Interactive map of Shakanai mine
- Location: Akita Prefecture, Japan
- Products: Lead, Zinc

Shakanai Mine (釈迦内鉱山, Shakanai kōzan) is one of the largest lead and zinc mines in Japan. The mine is located in northern Japan in Akita Prefecture. The mine has reserves amounting to 30 million tonnes of ore grading 0.9% lead, 3.3% zinc, 0.34 million oz of gold and 73.9 million oz of silver.
