= Toyoha mine =

Coordinates: 42°58′45″N 141°02′40″E

- Interactive map of Toyoha mine
- Location: Hokkaido, Japan
- Products: Lead, Zinc

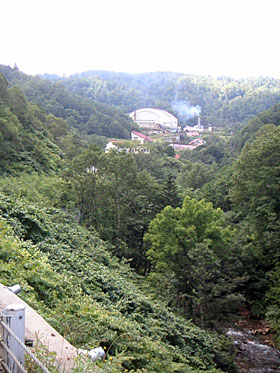
Ca. 2005

The Toyoha mine is one of the largest lead and zinc mines in Japan. The mine is located in northern Japan in Hokkaido. The mine has reserves amounting to 13 million tonnes of ore grading 2.1% lead, 7% zinc and 51.6 million oz of silver. It is located 30 km SW of Sapporo and is very close to an active hydrothermal system.
