= Hosokura mine =

Mine in Japan

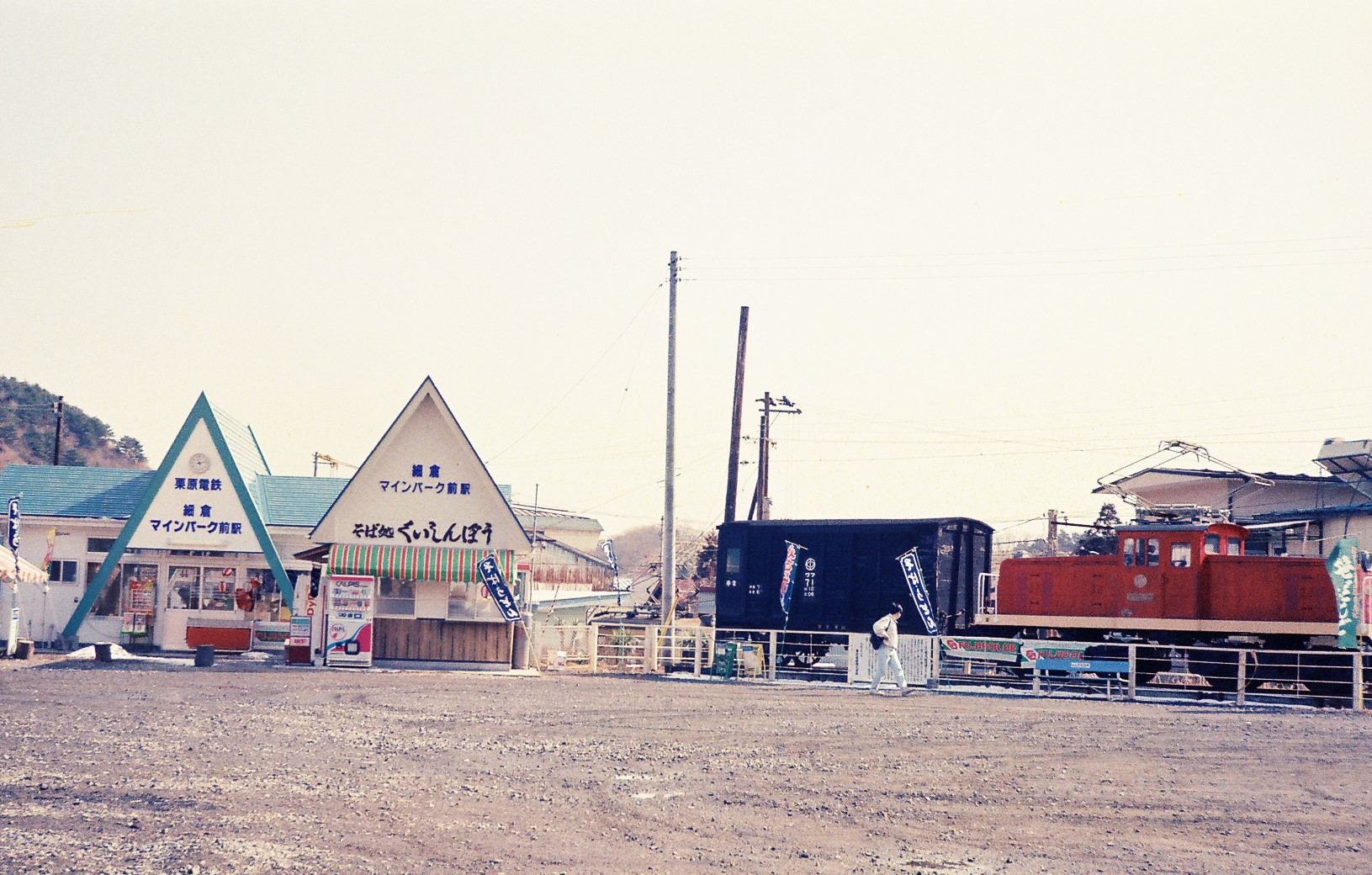

- Location within Miyagi Prefecture Location within Japan
- Location: Kurihara, Miyagi Prefecture, Japan; 38°48′29″N 140°53′59″E
- Products: Lead, Zinc

The Hosokura mine (細倉鉱山, Hosokura kkozan) was one of the largest lead and zinc mines in Japan. The mine was located in the town of Uguisuzawa, Miyagi Prefecture in the Tohoku region of northern Japan, in what is now the city of Kurihara. The mine had production of 26 million tonnes of ore grading 1.59% lead, 4.12% zinc and 12.8 million oz of silver before closing in 1987.

== Background ==
The Hosokura mine was located in the Ōu Mountains the northwest part of Miyagi prefecture. The mine extended for about 5 kilometers east-west and about 3 kilometers north and south and had ten major veins and over 150 minor veins of mineral deposits, with the vein width ranging from 12 meters to 15 meters at maximum, but on average 1.3 meters. Major minerals include galena, zinc blende and pyrite, along with smaller amounts of silver, copper, bismuth, cadmium, and gold.

== History ==
According to tradition, the mine was discovered in the 9th century, making it one of the oldest in Japan. However, historical records are almost non-existent until the late 16th century, when it was mentioned as a source of silver. The mine was developed under the Sendai Domain under the Date clan during the Edo period, and was known mostly for its production of silver and lead, and was a major source of revenue for the domain. After the Meiji Restoration, the mine was nationalized, but it did not develop as expected due to flood damage, fire, and a slump in lead market.

Mitsubishi Mining acquired the management rights of the Hosokura mine in 1934 and started a major modernization development, and it grew into a leading lead and zinc mine in Japan.

During World War II, records indicate that 234 American and 50 British POWs were forced to work in the mine.

Production of crude ore reached a peak in 1970 at 75,000 tons per month.

From the 1970s, the management of the Hosokura mine became difficult due to economic recession, and the mine closed in February 1987.

The mine is now partially opened to the public as a theme park.
