= Itomuka mine =

Mercury mine in Japan

- Interactive map of Itomuka mine
- Location: Hokkaido, Japan
- Products: Mercury

The Itomuka mine is one of the largest mercury mines in Japan and in the world. The mine is located in Hokkaido. The mine has estimated reserves of 0.95 million tonnes of ore grading 0.35% mercury.
