= Kosaka, Akita =

Kosaka 小坂町
- Town
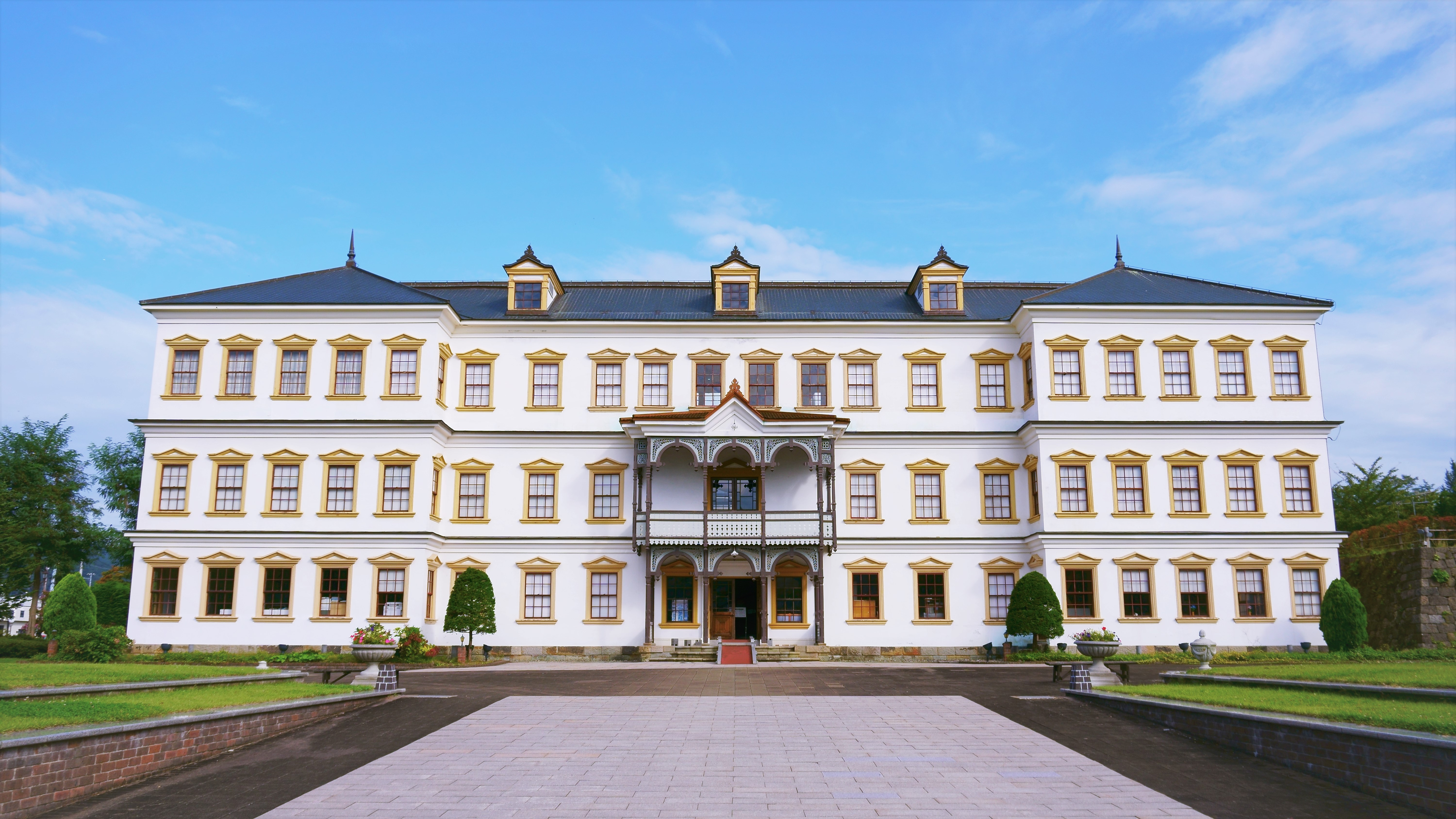
- Former head offices of Kosaka mine

- Flag Emblem
- Interactive map of Kosaka
- Coordinates: 40°19′59″N 140°44′10″E
- Country: Japan
- Region: Tōhoku
- Prefecture: Akita
- District: Kazuno

Area
  - Total: 201.70 km^{2} (77.88 sq mi)

Population (March 1, 2023)
  - Total: 4,670
  - Density: 23.2/km^{2} (60.0/sq mi)
- Time zone: UTC+9 (Japan Standard Time)
- Phone number: 0186-29-3901
- Address: Otarube 37-2, Kosaka-kozan, Kosakamachi, Kazuno-gun, Akita-ken 017-0292
- Website: Official website
- Symbols
- Fish: Sockeye salmon
- Flower: Acacia
- Tree: Prunus sargentii

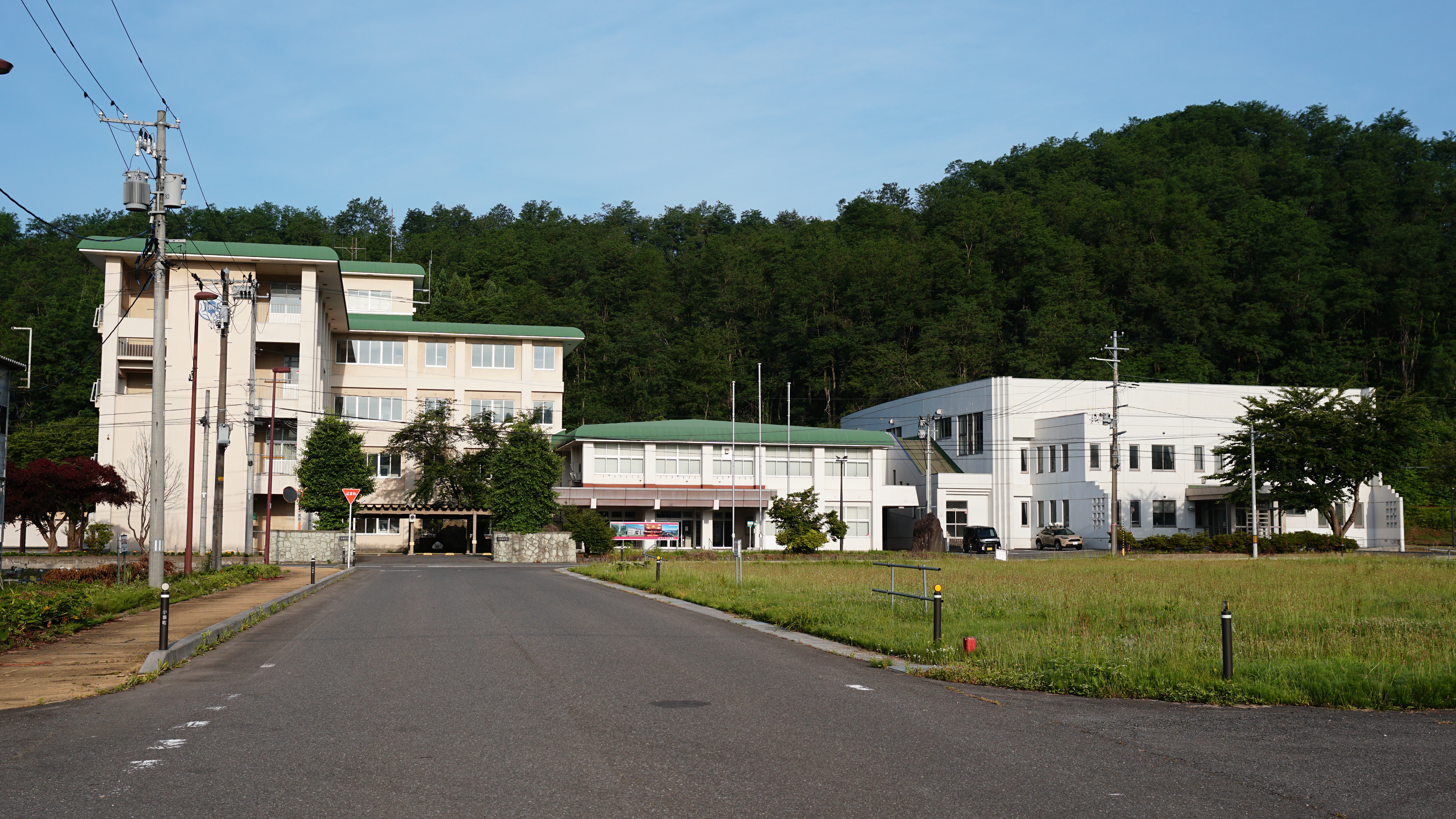
Kosaka Town Hall (originally a middle school)

Kosaka (小坂町, Kosaka-machi) is a town located in Kazuno District, Akita Prefecture, Japan. As of 1 March 2023, the town had an estimated population of 4,670 in 2,284 households, and population density of 23 persons per km^{2}. The total area of the town is 201.70 square kilometres (77.88 sq mi). In 2016, Kosaka was selected as one of The Most Beautiful Villages in Japan.

== Geography ==
Kosaka is located in the northern part of the Kazuno Basin in the Ōu Mountains in far northeastern Akita Prefecture, with Aomori Prefecture on the north, and Lake Towada to the northeast. Much of the town is within the borders of the Towada-Hachimantai National Park. Much of the town area is covered in forest. Due to its inland location, the town is noted for its heavy snowfall in winter.

=== Neighboring municipalities ===
Akita Prefecture

- Kazuno
- Ōdate

Aomori Prefecture

- Hirakawa
- Towada

== Climate ==
Kosaka has a cold humid continental climate characterized by cool short summers and long cold winters with heavy snowfall (Köppen climate classification Dfa). The average annual temperature in Kosaka is 8.4 °C. The average annual rainfall is 1466 mm with September as the wettest month. The temperatures are highest on average in August, at around 22.2 °C, and lowest in January, at around -4.3 °C.

== Demographics ==
Per Japanese census data, the population of Kosaka has declined by more than two-thirds since 1960.

Historical population
Year	Pop.	±%
1960	15,676	—
1970	13,768	−12.2%
1980	10,526	−23.5%
1990	8,035	−23.7%
2000	7,171	−10.8%
2010	6,054	−15.6%
2020	4,780	−21.0%

== History ==
The area of present-day Kosaka was part of ancient Mutsu Province and was ruled by the Nambu clan of Morioka Domain during the Edo period. The “Kosaka-kaido” highway connecting Morioka Domain with Hirosaki Domain passed through Kosaka. Under the Nambu, major deposits of gold and silver were mined by the Fujita-gumi, the predecessor to modern Dowa Holdings for the Nambu clan at the Kosaka mine. After the start of the Meiji period, the area became briefly part of Rikuchū Province before being transferred to Akita Prefecture in 1871. It was organized as part of Kazuno District, Akita Prefecture in 1878. The village of Kosaka was created with the establishment of the modern municipalities system on April 1, 1889. It was raised to town status on May 12, 1914.

== Economy ==
The town prospered greatly as a mining center for gold, silver, copper and zinc in the Meiji period, and many modern buildings were built, including the Kosaka mining office. After the Second World War, mining resources were depleted and the town declined. In recent years, there have been efforts to find ways to create a town that makes use of the modern architecture of the Meiji period and the tourism resources of Lake Towada. In addition to this, Dowa Holdings, the owner of the Kosaka Mine, is active in the metal recycling industry. In terms of light manufacturing, the Towada Audio Corporation, a manufacturer of shortwave radio sets, TV tuners and AC adapters in the Sony group, is based in Kosaka.

== Education ==
Kosaka has one public elementary school and one public middle school operated by the town government and one public high school operated by the Akita Prefectural Board of Education.

== Transportation ==
=== Railway ===
The Kosaka Smelting & Refining Kosaka Line provided passenger services until 1994. At present, the town is not served by any passenger railway line.

=== Highway ===
- Tōhoku Expressway
- Akita Expressway
- National Route 103
- National Route 282
- National Route 454

== Local attractions ==
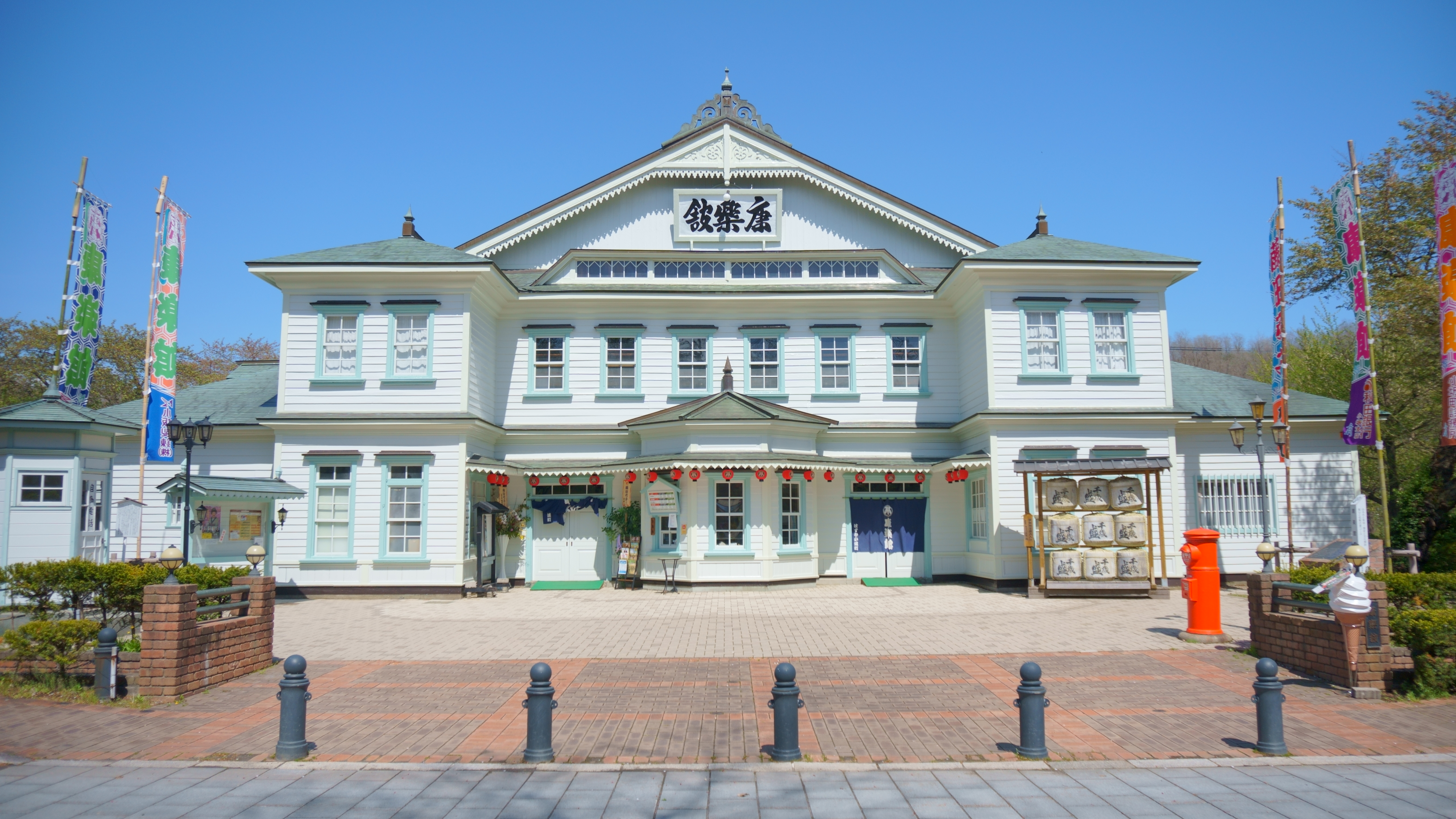
Korakukan Kabuki theatre

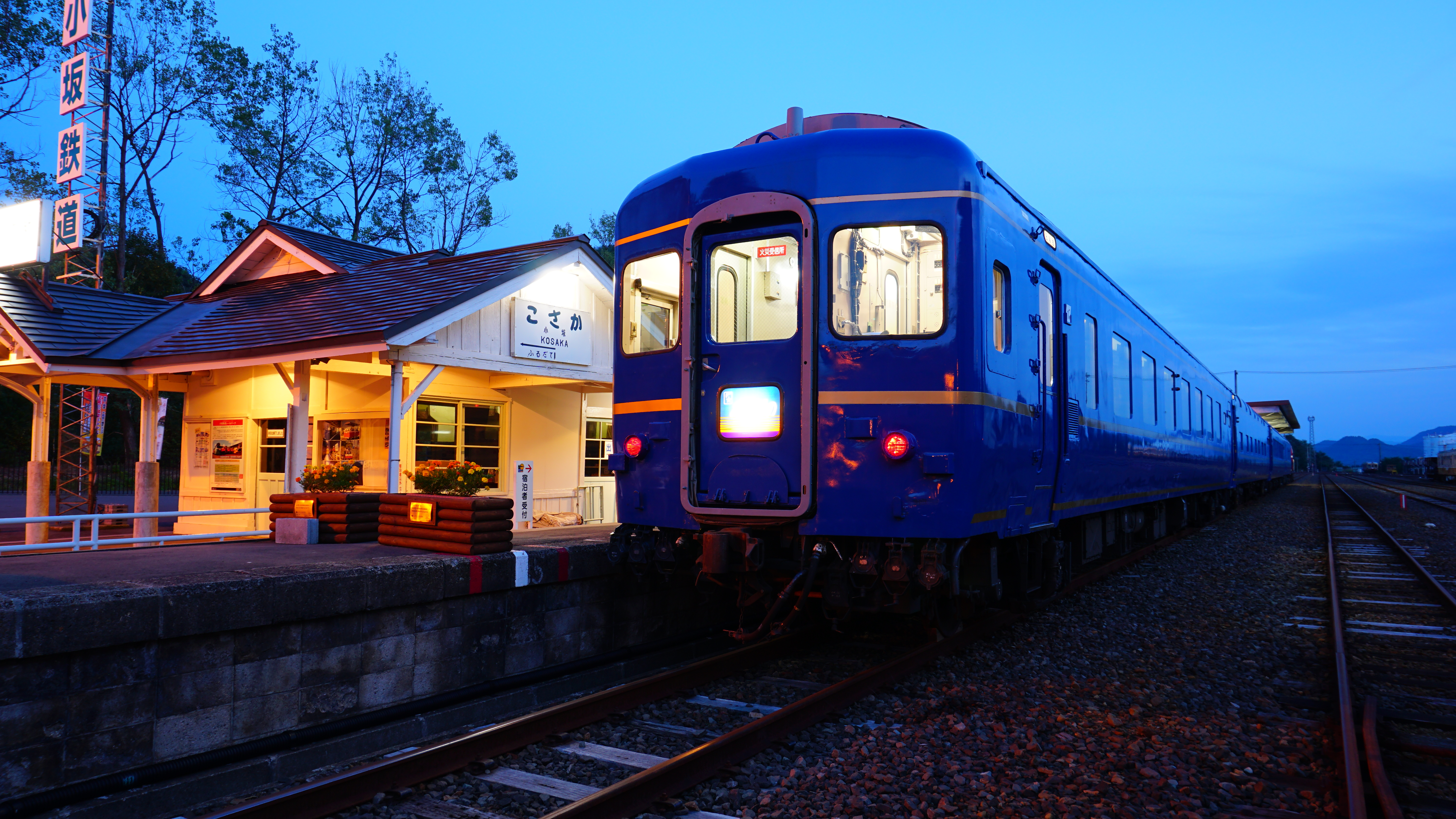
Kosaka Railroad Rail Park

- Akita Inaka language school (since 2019)
- Koraku-kan - the oldest operating, traditional Kabuki theatre in Japan. The Koraku-kan was made of all wood in 1910, and is stylistically a mix of western and traditional Japanese architecture. It was designated as an Important Cultural Property in 2002.
- Former head offices of Kosaka mine (National Important Cultural Property)
- Lake Towada
- Nanataki Falls – one of the Japan's Top 100 Waterfalls
