= Iriomote Coal Mine =

Coal mine in Okinawa Prefecture, Japan

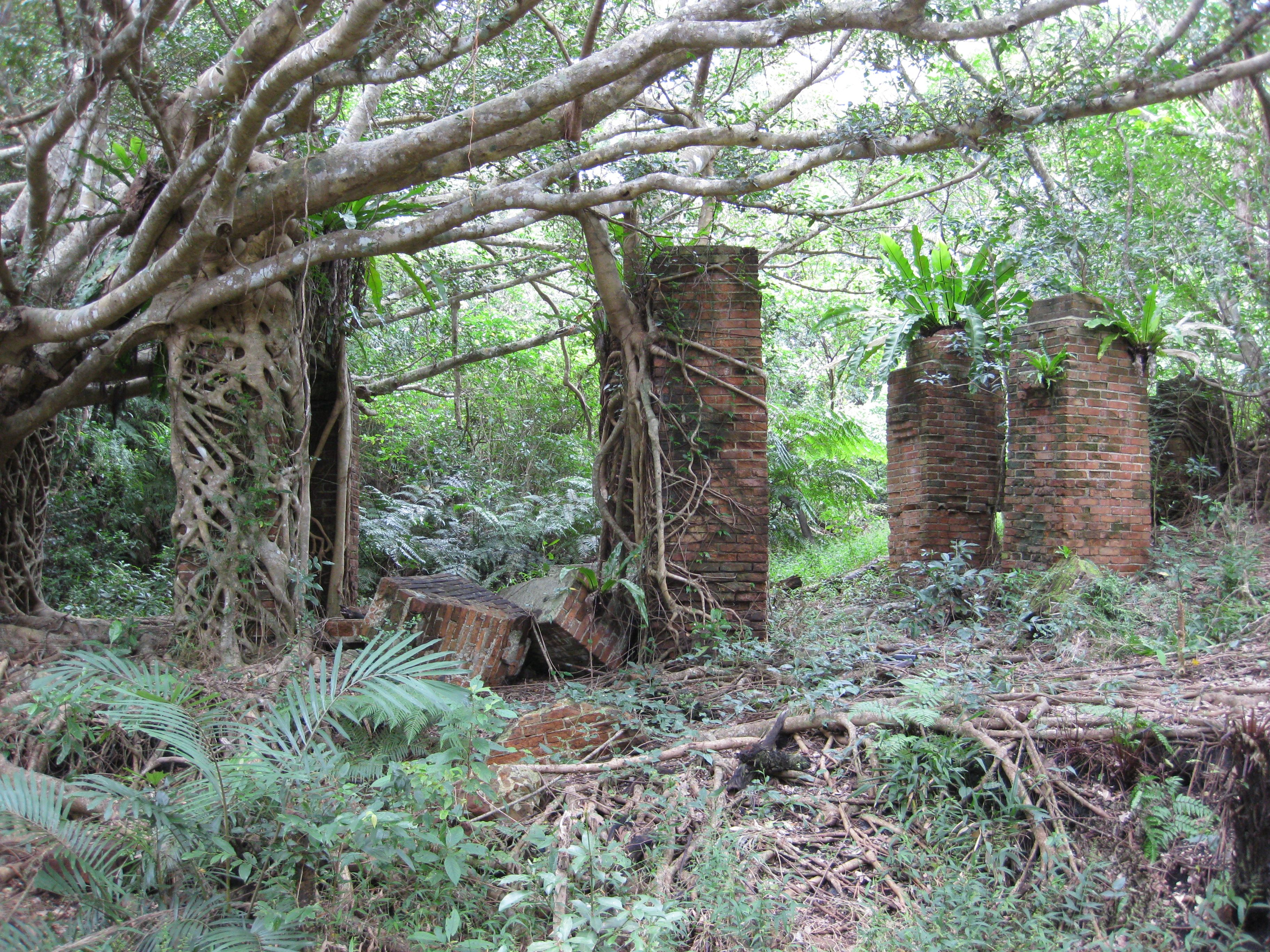
Ruins of Utara Coal Mine of Iriomote, Okinawa, Japan

The Iriomote Coal Mine (西表炭鉱, Iriomote tankō) was a producing coal mine in the northwestern area of Uchibanare and Iriomote Islands, Okinawa Prefecture, Japan. At its peak, between 120,000 and 130,000 tons of coal were produced annually in the years 1936 and 1937 by 1,400 coal mine workers, but production ceased in 1960.

== History ==
On Iriomote Island, sandstone layers of the Iriomote Formation of the Yaeyama Group were laid down in the Miocene era. Between the layers of sandstone are layers of coal which vary from 15 to 90 cm thick. On the island, this burning stone had been known for a long time. In a document written at end of the 18th century, this burning stone was described in detail. In 1853 a technician with American Commodore Matthew C. Perry reported the presence of coal in Shioya Bay, Okinawa. In 1854 Ryūkyū ordered the people of Iriomote to plant trees to hide the coal mines. In 1871 Hayashi Tasuke of Satsuma asked Ōhama Kana to find the coal. Ōhama was exiled to a remote island for leaking the secret. In 1885 the Japanese Government first investigated the Iriomote Coal Mine. In 1886 a politician, Yamagata Aritomo inspected the site with Masuda Takashi of Mitsui Zaibatsu company, and suggested the use of prisoners to mine the coal. Mitsui Bussan Company started mining the coal with between 100 and 200 workers including prisoners. On 21 September 1889, there was a severe outbreak of malaria which put an end to mining operations for the time being.

== The development of the Iriomote coal mines ==
In 1891, several companies resumed coal mining at Iriomote but ceased their operations shortly thereafter. After the Russo-Japanese War and World War I were over, there was a new boom in coal mining. The Okinawa Mining Company and Ryukyu Mining Company, both founded in 1906, were successful in coal mining operations at Iriomote. The mines were distributed on Uchibanare Island and the areas along the Nakaragawa river and the Urauchigawa River. The extracted coal was energy rich and was exported to Japan and to Formosa, Shanghai and Hong Kong.

== Problems of the workers ==
There had been repeated founding and merging of coal mine companies which had led to problems for the workers. The payment of wages was made by the Naya Seido or Kinsaki method, by which a Kinsaki person was responsible for the production of coal and the personal management of the wage money. The salary of the workers was under the control of the Kinsaki person or Nayagashira, and given in coupons redeemable at the shops of the company. The coupons were said to be interchangeable for bank notes, but at unfavorable rates. Many workers grew to have debts due to the job brokers. Originally Iriomote Island was sparsely inhabited, and the workers were imported from various parts of Japan, Taiwan and China without detailed information of the work they would be doing or the conditions they would be living in. Employment brokers used sweet words such as, "It is warm in Iriomote, and there is no need of clothes. There are many women and you can eat pine and bananas by extending your arms. You can make lots of money and there is no place better than this." However, the bananas have owners, and the pines were really pandanus tectorius and not edible. The working conditions were very hard. Some of the workers tried to escape from the island, but they were seldom successful. The biggest company did have a 300-seat theater and other worker facilities.

== Decline and end of Iriomote Coal Mine ==
In 1941, the Pacific War had started and many workers were drafted for military service with the Japanese Imperial army. In 1943, the coal mines ceased production due to a shortage of workers. After the war, the mines were taken over and reopened in 1953 by Americans who resumed production. Eventually, the arrangement of the coal in thinning layers did not allow large quantities of coal to be mined. This led to small profits for the owners and the mines final closure in 1960.

== See also ==
- Utara Coal Mine
