= Kosaka mine =

Coordinates: 40°20′14″N 140°45′13″E

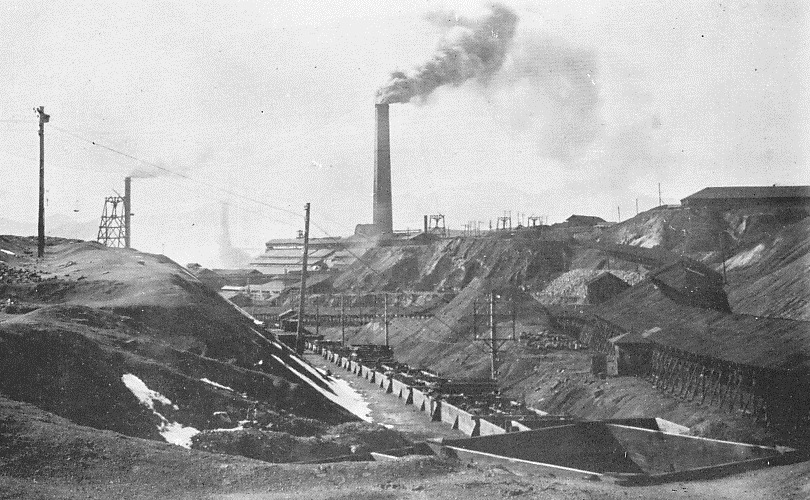
- Kosaka Mine in the 1930s
- Interactive map of Kosaka mine
- Location: Akita Prefecture, Japan
- Products: gold, silver, copper, Lead, Zinc
- Company: Dowa Holdings

The Kosaka mine (小坂鉱山, Kosaka-kōzan) was one of the largest copper, lead and zinc mines in Japan. The mine is located in Tōhoku region of northern Japan in the town of Kosaka, Akita Prefecture. The mine had reserves amounting to 30 million tonnes of ore grading 2.84% lead, 8.48% zinc, 1.1 million oz of gold and 177.3 million oz of silver.

== History ==
In 1816, development of gold and silver deposits began under the Nambu clan of Morioka Domain, with the mine under the control of the Fujita-gumi mining guild. After the Meiji restoration, in 1871, the mine was nationalized, and in 1873 the foreign advisor Curt Netto was recruited by the Japanese government was placed in charge of modernizing the mine. In 1884 the mine was privatized, and sold to the Fujita-gumi, which later became Dowa Holdings, one of the largest non-ferrous metals producers in Japan.

Following 1901, improvements in smelting technology enabled the company to exploit its large deposits of “black ore” (a mixture of copper, zinc and lead). In order to attract workers to the remote location, the company built much of the local infrastructure, including apartments, a hospital, theatre, as well as a railroad to connect the town to the Ou Main Line railway at Ōdate. By 1907, it was the largest producer of copper in Japan. However, local complains about air and water pollution from the smelter increased dramatically in the 1910s and 1920s, as was the case at the Ashio Copper Mine.

Mining was interrupted during World War II due to gradual depletion of the mineral deposits. However, a new vein was discovered in the 1960s, which allowed mining to resume until 1990.

== Status ==
The Meiji period Kosaka Mine Headquarters and Korakukan kabuki theatre have been designated Important Cultural Property in 2002. The mine itself is no longer an active mine, and its site is now occupied by Green Fill Kosaka, one of Japan's largest capacity private-sector final waste treatment disposal facilities
