= Shimokawa, Hokkaido =

Shimokawa 下川町
- Town
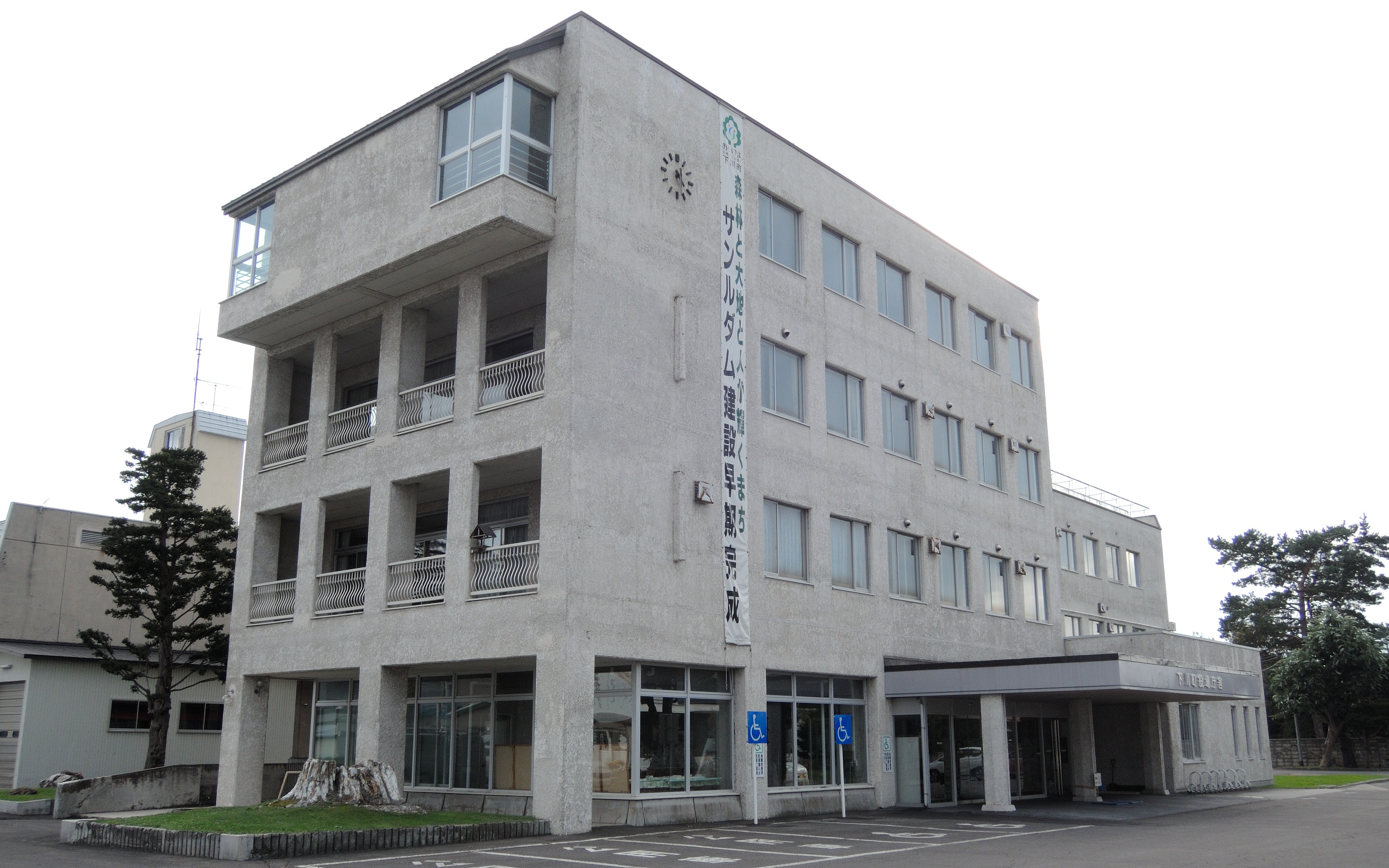
- Shimokawa town hall

- Flag Seal
- Location of Shimokawa in Hokkaido (Kamikawa Subprefecture)

- Location in Japan
- Coordinates: 44°18′09″N 142°38′07″E
- Country: Japan
- Region: Hokkaido
- Prefecture: Hokkaido (Kamikawa Subprefecture)
- District: Kamikawa (Teshio)

Area
  - Total: 644.54 km^{2} (248.86 sq mi)

Population (February 1, 2025)
  - Total: 2,832
  - Density: 4.394/km^{2} (11.38/sq mi)
- Time zone: UTC+09:00 (JST)
- City hall address: 63 Saiwai-cho, Shimokawa-cho, Kamikawa-gun, Hokkaido 098-1206
- Climate: Dfb
- Website: Official website
- Symbols
- Flower: Gentiana triflora var. japonica
- Mascot: Shimorin (しもりん)
- Tree: Sakhalin fir

Shimokawa (下川町, Shimokawa-chō) is a town located in Kamikawa Subprefecture, Hokkaido, Japan. As of 1 February 2025, the town had an estimated population of 2,832 in 1599 households, and a population density of 4.4 people per km^{2}. The total area of the town is 644.54 km^{2} (248.86 sq mi). In the 2000s, the city set a goal of "realizing a sustainable local community," and worked to utilize forest resources including biomass and thereby improve energy self-sufficiency. In 2017, it won the Prime Minister's Award at the first Japan SDGs Awards, which are based on the Sustainable Development Goals (SDGs) proposed by the United Nations.。

== Geography ==
Shimokawa is located on the eastern edge of the Nayoro Basin, in the upper reaches of the Nayoro River, a tributary of the Teshio River (the second longest river in Hokkaido) that flows through northern Hokkaido. The Nayoro River has two branches: the Sanru River (smaller) and the Panke River (larger). The Sanru River is very clear and is a spawning area for Cherry Trout. Fly fishing is very popular in Shimokawa.Most of the area is made up of the slopes of the Kitami Mountains.Shimokawa is 90% forest: primarily oak, white birch, larch, and pine trees.

=== Neighbouring municipalities ===
- Hokkaido
  - Nayoro
  - Shibetsu
  - Nishiokoppe
  - Omu
  - Takinoue

== Climate ==
Shimokawa has a Humid continental climate (Köppen Dfb) characterized by cold summers and cold winters with heavy snowfall. The average annual temperature in Shimokawa is 4.9 °C. The average annual rainfall is 1164 mm with September as the wettest month. The temperatures are highest on average in August, at around 19.0 °C, and lowest in January, at around -9.2 °C. Shimokawa's seasonal snowfall can begin as early as November and continue through to April. Though it is generally shorter than an average summer season, June–August sees temperatures reach as high as 30 °C.

Climate data for Shimokawa, elevation 143 m (469 ft), (1991−2020 normals, extremes 1978−present)
Month	Jan	Feb	Mar	Apr	May	Jun	Jul	Aug	Sep	Oct	Nov	Dec	Year
Record high °C (°F)	6.4 (43.5)	11.3 (52.3)	15.1 (59.2)	26.6 (79.9)	31.9 (89.4)	34.0 (93.2)	37.3 (99.1)	36.2 (97.2)	31.5 (88.7)	25.1 (77.2)	19.8 (67.6)	12.4 (54.3)	37.3 (99.1)
Mean daily maximum °C (°F)	−3.9 (25.0)	−2.7 (27.1)	1.7 (35.1)	9.3 (48.7)	17.1 (62.8)	21.3 (70.3)	24.7 (76.5)	25.0 (77.0)	21.0 (69.8)	13.9 (57.0)	5.2 (41.4)	−1.7 (28.9)	10.9 (51.6)
Daily mean °C (°F)	−8.8 (16.2)	−8.2 (17.2)	−3.3 (26.1)	3.6 (38.5)	10.2 (50.4)	14.8 (58.6)	18.8 (65.8)	19.4 (66.9)	14.7 (58.5)	7.9 (46.2)	1.3 (34.3)	−5.4 (22.3)	5.4 (41.8)
Mean daily minimum °C (°F)	−15.7 (3.7)	−15.8 (3.6)	−9.8 (14.4)	−2.4 (27.7)	3.3 (37.9)	8.8 (47.8)	13.8 (56.8)	14.7 (58.5)	9.1 (48.4)	2.4 (36.3)	−2.7 (27.1)	−10.7 (12.7)	−0.4 (31.2)
Record low °C (°F)	−35.1 (−31.2)	−36.1 (−33.0)	−32.3 (−26.1)	−15.8 (3.6)	−6.0 (21.2)	−2.1 (28.2)	1.5 (34.7)	2.7 (36.9)	−1.0 (30.2)	−7.5 (18.5)	−20.9 (−5.6)	−31.7 (−25.1)	−36.1 (−33.0)
Average precipitation mm (inches)	36.8 (1.45)	28.2 (1.11)	37.3 (1.47)	42.8 (1.69)	62.9 (2.48)	64.1 (2.52)	126.8 (4.99)	143.6 (5.65)	147.0 (5.79)	118.8 (4.68)	95.8 (3.77)	60.7 (2.39)	964.8 (37.98)
Average snowfall cm (inches)	184 (72)	150 (59)	139 (55)	40 (16)	0 (0)	0 (0)	0 (0)	0 (0)	0 (0)	3 (1.2)	82 (32)	204 (80)	820 (323)
Average extreme snow depth cm (inches)	99 (39)	114 (45)	116 (46)	78 (31)	0 (0)	0 (0)	0 (0)	0 (0)	0 (0)	2 (0.8)	29 (11)	68 (27)	116 (46)
Average precipitation days (≥ 1.0 mm)	14.3	11.8	12.9	10.8	10.9	9.8	12.3	12.1	14.8	16.4	18.7	18.8	163.6
Average snowy days (≥ 3 cm)	20.3	17.9	16.9	5.9	0	0	0	0	0	0.3	8.2	20.7	90.2
Mean monthly sunshine hours	64.9	88.7	124.4	151.3	181.9	161.4	157.4	148.2	150.2	119.2	55.5	41.7	1,443.6
Source: JMA

=== Demographics ===
Per Japanese census data, the population of Shimokawa is as shown below. The town is in a long period of sustained population loss.

Historical population
Year	Pop.	±%
1940	9,241	—
1950	13,420	+45.2%
1960	15,555	+15.9%
1970	11,568	−25.6%
1980	7,173	−38.0%
1990	5,065	−29.4%
2000	4,413	−12.9%
2010	3,775	−14.5%
2020	3,126	−17.2%

== History ==
The area of Shimokawa has been settled since Japanese Paleolithic times. The town name comes from the Ainu word "Panke-Nukanan" (Nukanan River, downstream). The oldest ruins in the town are estimated to date back to the end of the last glacial period The Ainu people had hamlets along the Teshio River. During the Edo period, the area of Shimokawa was part of the territory of the Matsumae Domain. The area was explored by Matsuura Takeshirō in 1857, but the first Japanese settler did not arrive until 1901, where a group of 25 households from what is now Gujō, Gifu migrated to this area. On January 1, 1924, the eastern portion of Nayoro Town became the village of Shimokawa. It was raised to town status in 1964.December 1, 1949

== Government ==
Shimokawa has a mayor-council form of government with a directly elected mayor and a unicameral town council of eight members. Shimokawa, collectively with the other municipalities of Kawakami sub-prefecture, contributes three members to the Hokkaidō Prefectural Assembly. In terms of national politics, the town is part of the Hokkaidō 6th district of the lower house of the Diet of Japan.

== Economy ==
Dairy farming is thriving. The town is close to the northern limit of rice cultivation, and most of the former rice paddies have been converted to other crops due to the rice production reduction policy. The main agricultural products are tomatoes, which are processed locally, vegetables such as green peas, wheat, buckwheat, and glutinous rice. About 90% of the town's area is forested, and more than 80% of that is national forest. When the town was first developed it was heavily dependent on forestry, but the rise of imported timber, most industries were abandoned. The town is working on "sustainable-based forestry management," cutting and replanting about 50 hectares per year. The Sanru Mine, which produced gold and silver, and the Shimokawa Mine, which produced copper and zinc, are both closed and abandoned. In addition, deposits of manganese, titanium sand, lignite, and other minerals have been confirmed.

== Education ==
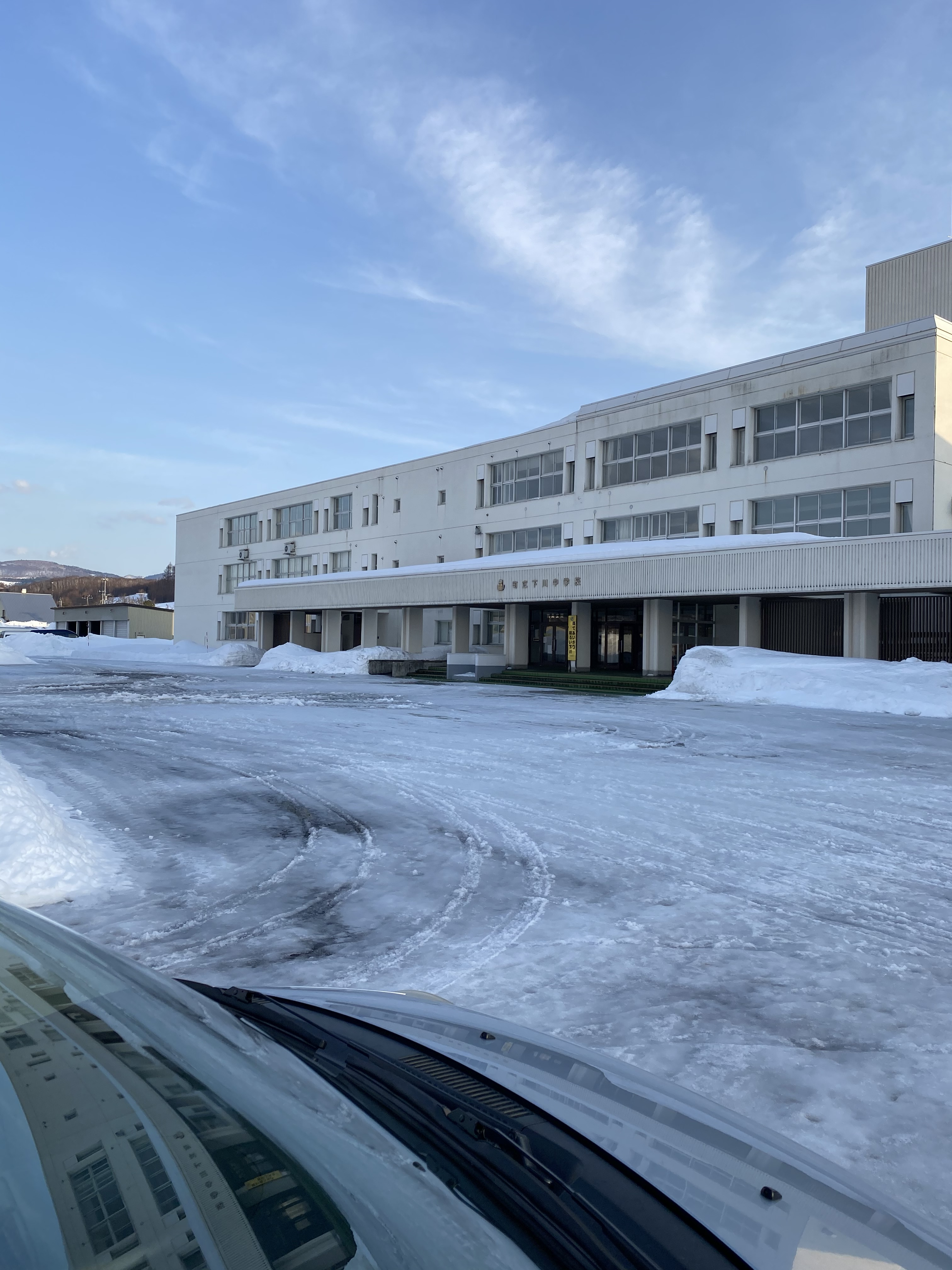
Shimokawa Junior High School

Shimokawa has one public elementary school and one public junior high school operated by the town government. The town does not have a high school.

== Transportation ==
=== Railways ===
Shimokawa does not have any passenger railway service. The nearest station is currently Nayoro Station on the JR Hokkaido Sōya Main Line.

=== Highways ===
- National Route 239

== Sports ==
Shimokawa has produced many Olympic ski jumpers. For the 2006 Winter Olympics, four ski jumpers who were born in Shimokawa attended (Noriaki Kasai, Takanobu Okabe, Daiki Ito and Kenshiro Ito). Until the 2014 Winter Olympics, Noriaki Kasai has participated seven times. Takanobu Okabe has taken part in four Olympics and got the gold medal at the 1998 Winter Olympics in the team tournament. Daiki Ito has participated thrice. Yuki Ito, Kenshiro Ito and Hiroo Shima have participated once.

== Local attractions ==
=== Hot Springs ===
Shimokawa has a hot spring called "Gomi Onsen" (五味温泉). It is located approximately a 5-minute car drive away from the city center. The onsen features a carbon dioxide-containing hydrogen carbonate spring that is rare in Japan. The site has indoor and outdoor onsen baths as well as a sauna. The main building has two western-style and 8 traditional-style hotel rooms. An adjacent annex has 7 traditional-style rooms.

Around Gomi Onsen, there is a forest called "Experience Forest" where you can take a walk along the promenade. There are west forest, east forest, and north forest, and you can observe the characteristic trees, scenery, flora, and fauna of each. Other wooden paths and biotopes are available as well.

=== Festivals and events ===
Annually, Shimokawa has three main festivals, and several smaller festivals. The three main festivals are as follows:

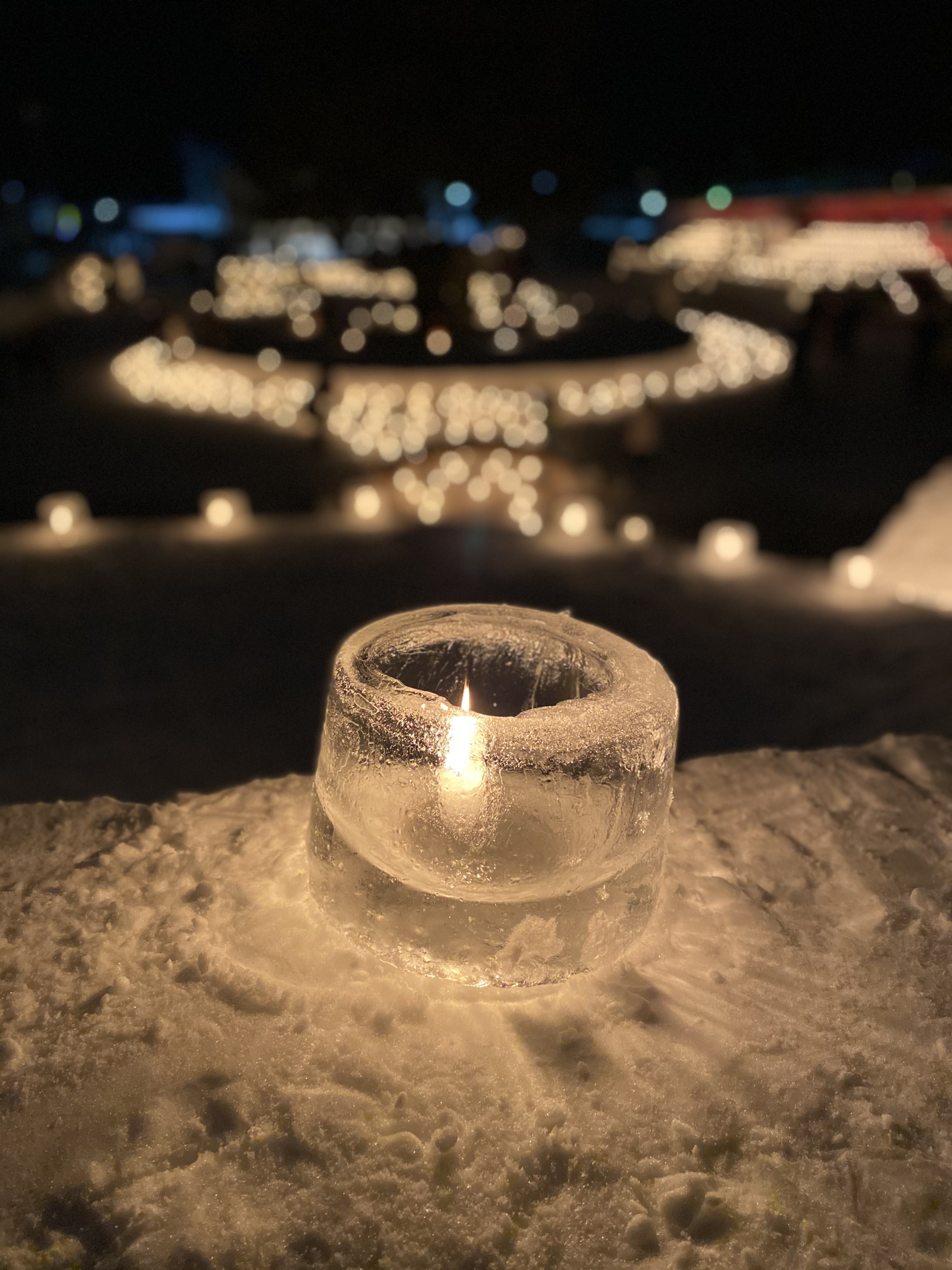
1. Shimokawa's Ice Candle Festival (2021)
  Ice Candle Museum: For a week near the end of February, Shimokawa's main park is filled with snow sculptures and decorated with thousands of ice candles. Events are held throughout the week, and kicked off with a large outdoor BBQ party on the first day.
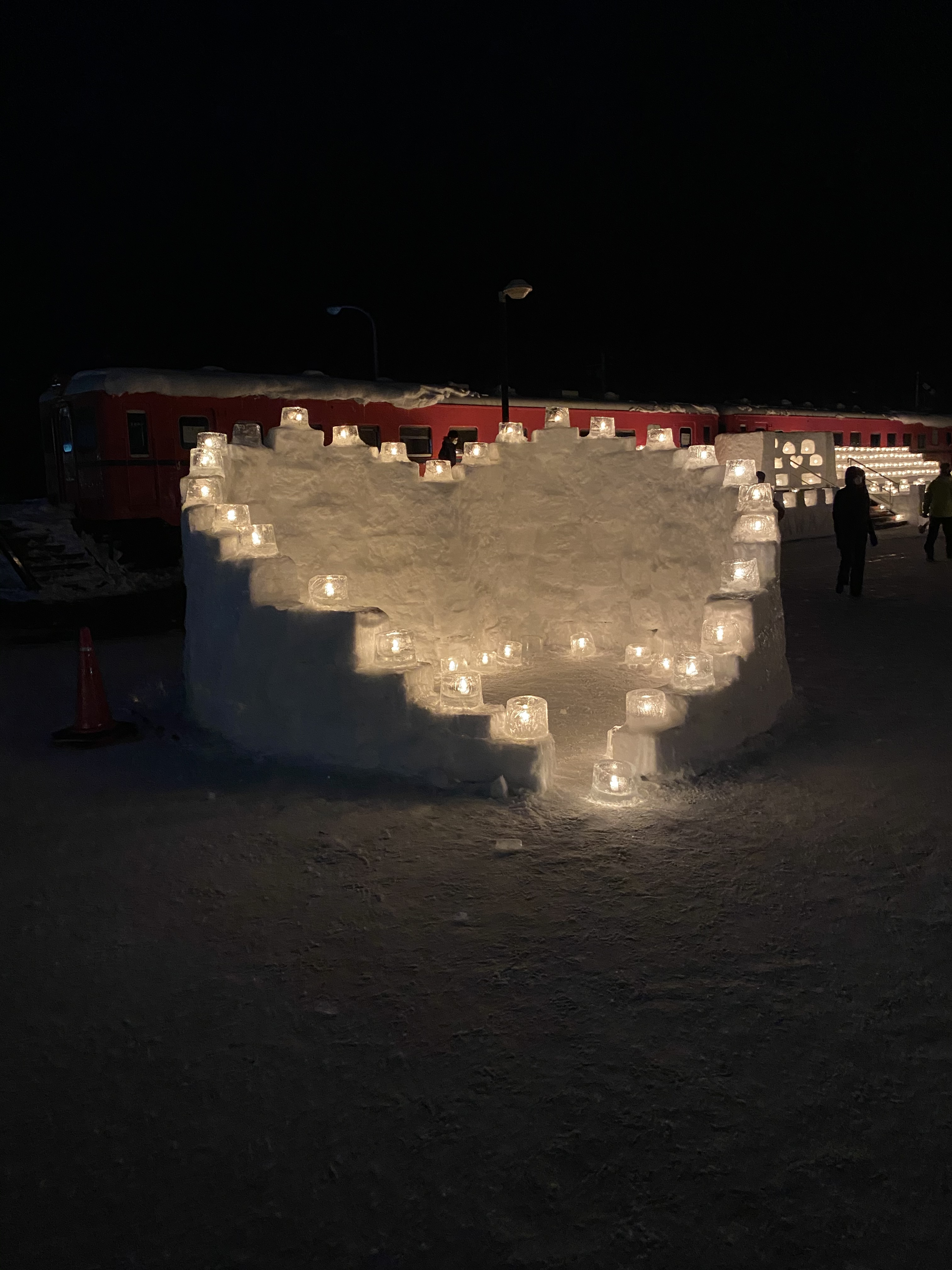
  A 'heart' display at 2021's Ice Candle Festival
2. Udon Festival: The last weekend in August is a two-day festival filled with events such as races, baking contests, and traditional dances. Until 2005 it was called the Homecoming Festival.
3. Great Wall Festival: One afternoon in early spring, a large BBQ party with events and carnival-style booths is held in Shimokawa's main park, which contains a small replica of the Great Wall of China.

Below are some of the many other festivals held annually in Shimokawa (in rough order of size):

- Arts Weekend: A weekend of photo and craft exhibitions, concerts, and traditional arts (such as Tea Ceremony).
- Culture Weekend: A weekend where many companies, offices, and factories open their doors to the public for tours.
- Every school has their own sports festival weekend (where the students compete at different sports) and a separate school festival weekend (where the students organize activities and sales for themselves and the townspeople).
- Mikoshi Parade: A Mikoshi (portable shrine) is carried through the town to drive away evil spirits. This is no easy feat, as the shrine weighs over one tonne.
- Marching Band Parade: Held to coincide with Shimokawa's War Memorial Day, marching bands (one from each school) parade through town, led by war veterans.

== Mascot ==
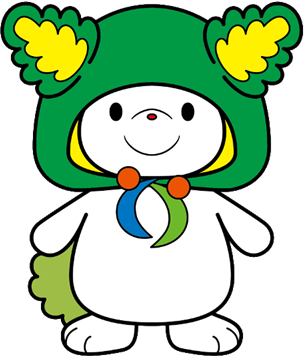
Shimorin, the town's mascot

Shimokawa's mascot is Shimorin (しもりん). She is a curious yet hard working forest rabbit who spreads good virtues. She wears a headscarf made from wood. She also had wooden ears, a snowy body and a Shimokawa Green-tail. Her birthday is December 1. She is responsible for preserving the Banri No Chojo wall with masonry skills but she also good at making ice candles. When she is on breaks, she usually watches ski jumping (and other events that she loves) and relax at Gomi Onsen. She loves to go to the Shimokawa Forest. She also loves tenobe noodles served with tomato juice and vegetables.
