= Utara Coal Mine =

Coal mine in Okinawa Prefecture, Japan

Coordinates: 24.2000°N 123.4800°E

Utara Coal Mine is a coal mine along the Utara River of Iriomote, Okinawa Prefecture, Japan, where mining was in operation between 1935 and 1943. In 2007, it was designated as a Heritage of Industrial Modernization in Japan.

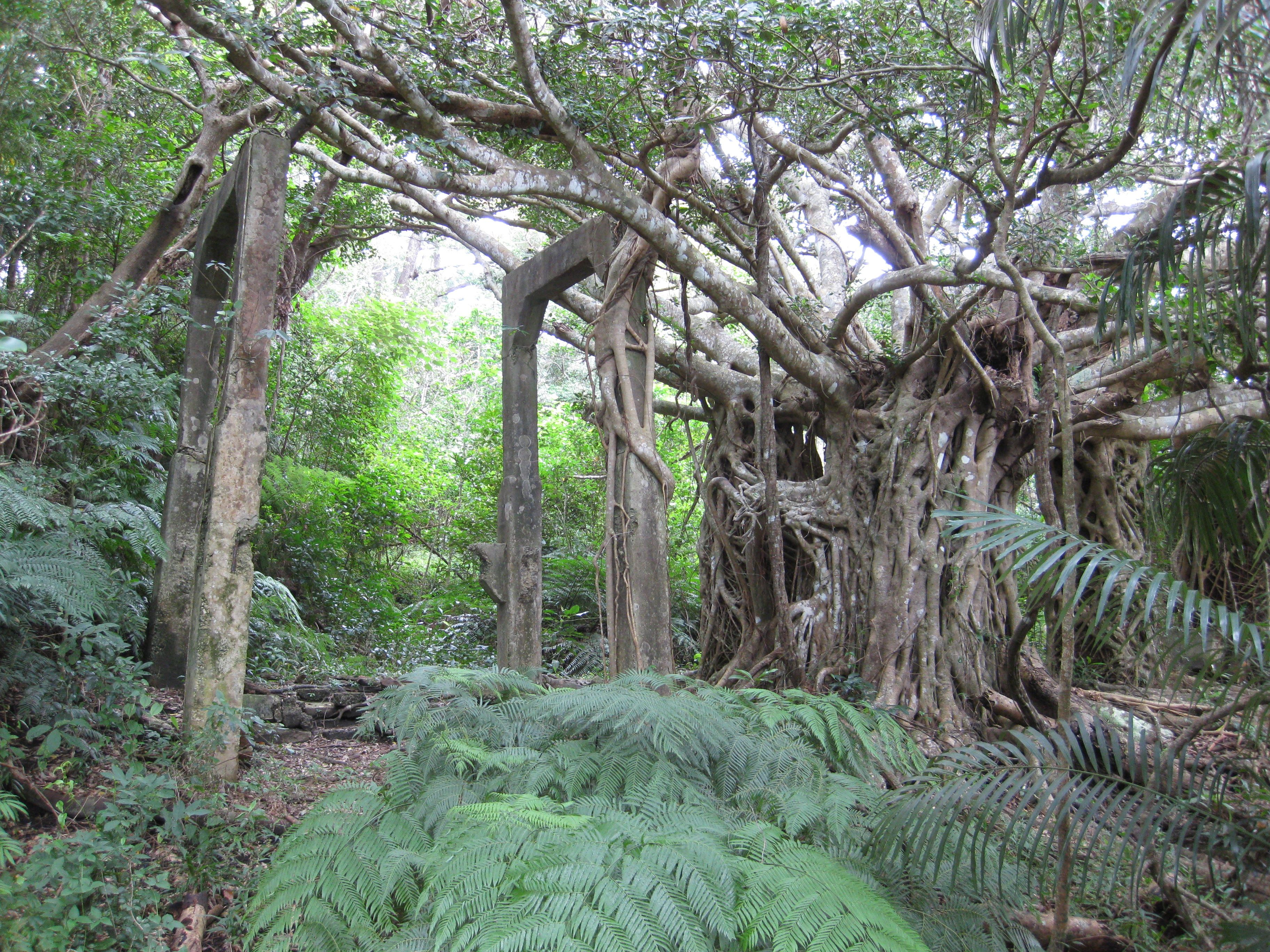
Pillars of truck entangled by Ficus microcarpa during 60 years

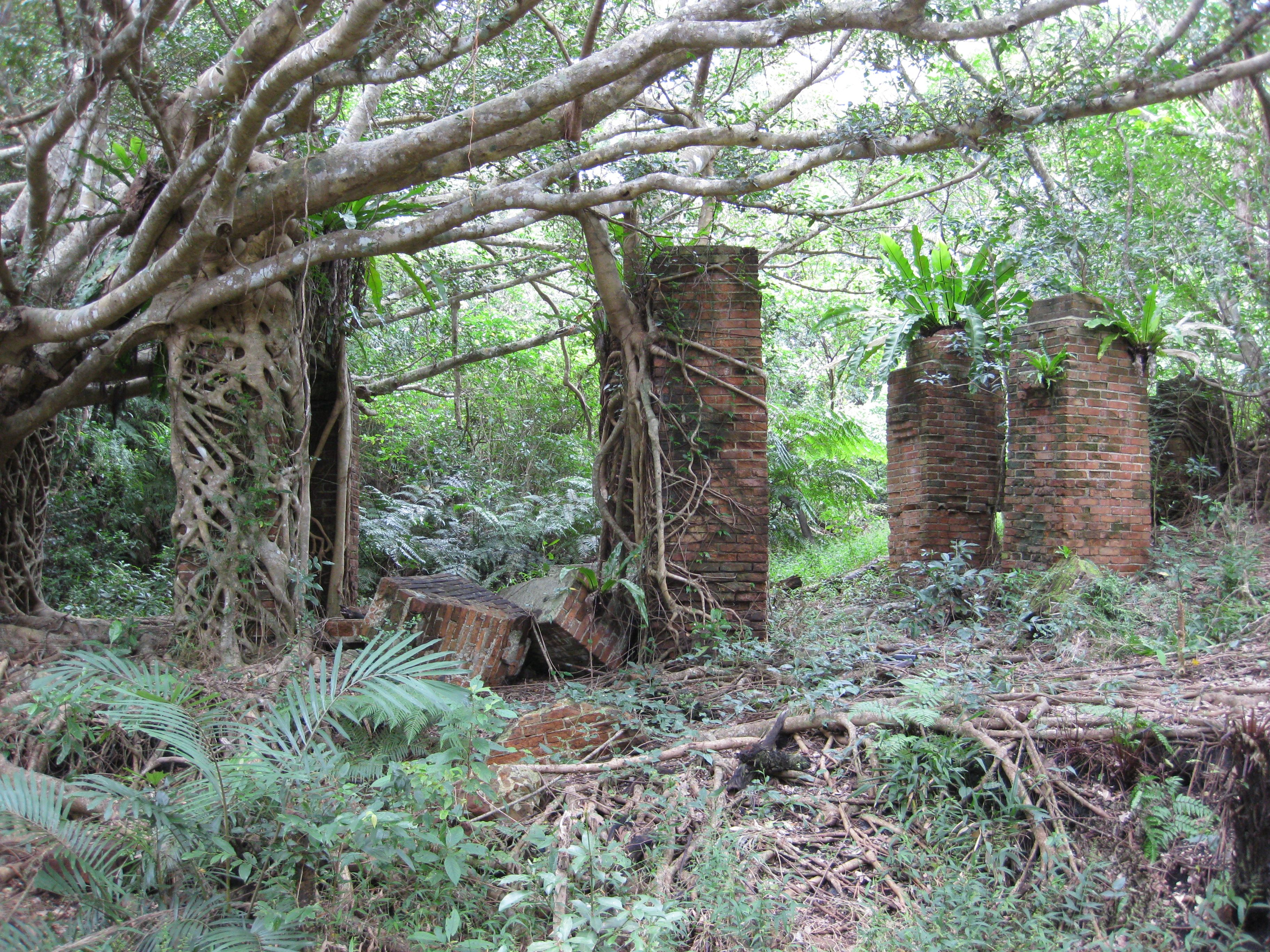
Pillars composed of brick

== History ==
One of the main coal mining companies within Iriomote Island, Marumitsu Mining Company, found thick layers of coal along Utara River in 1935. Earlier, the predecessor of Marumitsu Mining Company, Takasaki Mining Company was established in 1924 by Kōichirō Noda, a contractor with 50 workers, Kimiichi Oguri, an accountant general, and Shōsaburō Takasaki, a money lender in Naha. The company changed their name to Marumitsu Goumei Company in 1933. First, they mined coal along Nakara River but then they investigated other areas and found good layers of coal along Utara River in 1935. In 1936, they started to mining there with a large lodging house for 400 single workers and more than 10 houses for couples. There were two thick layers of coal in the Utara Mine; one was 60 cm thick and the other 40 cm thick. Coal was sent first by Minecart and later by boat on the Utara river carrying 20 to 30 tons each. In 1938, the mine was producing 2,500 tons monthly. Facilities for workers were extraordinarily good, compared with other mines. Sanitary conditions were greatly improved; glass was used for the prevention of mosquitoes and hence malaria. There were large bathrooms, good water supplies and a doctor's office. There was a 300-seat theater for movies; and dramas were played by workers there. There were three festivals for the workers. Children were educated at a school called Midori Gakuen (Green School). However, the involvement in the Pacific War in 1941 increased the demand for coal, leading to a worsening of mining conditions; men were drafted into military service and the mining operation was discontinued in 1943. The buildings of the mine were destroyed by American air raids. The president of the company, Kōichirō Noda gave up the mine and was engaged in agriculture. The Midori School was made a forerunner to Uehara Elementary School, Taketomi, Okinawa.

== Cultural heritage ==
In 2007, the ruins of the Utara Mine were designated as a Heritage of Industrial Modernization in Japan and a road was improved.

== See also ==
- Iriomote Coal Mine
