= Dowa Holdings =

Japanese nonferrous metals manufacturer

Dowa Holdings Co., Ltd.
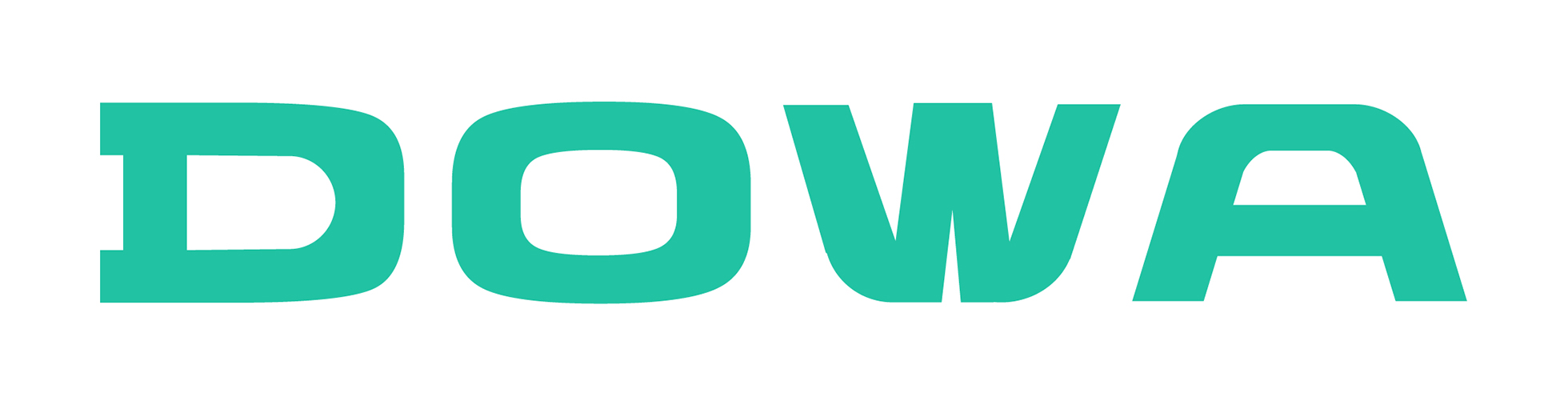

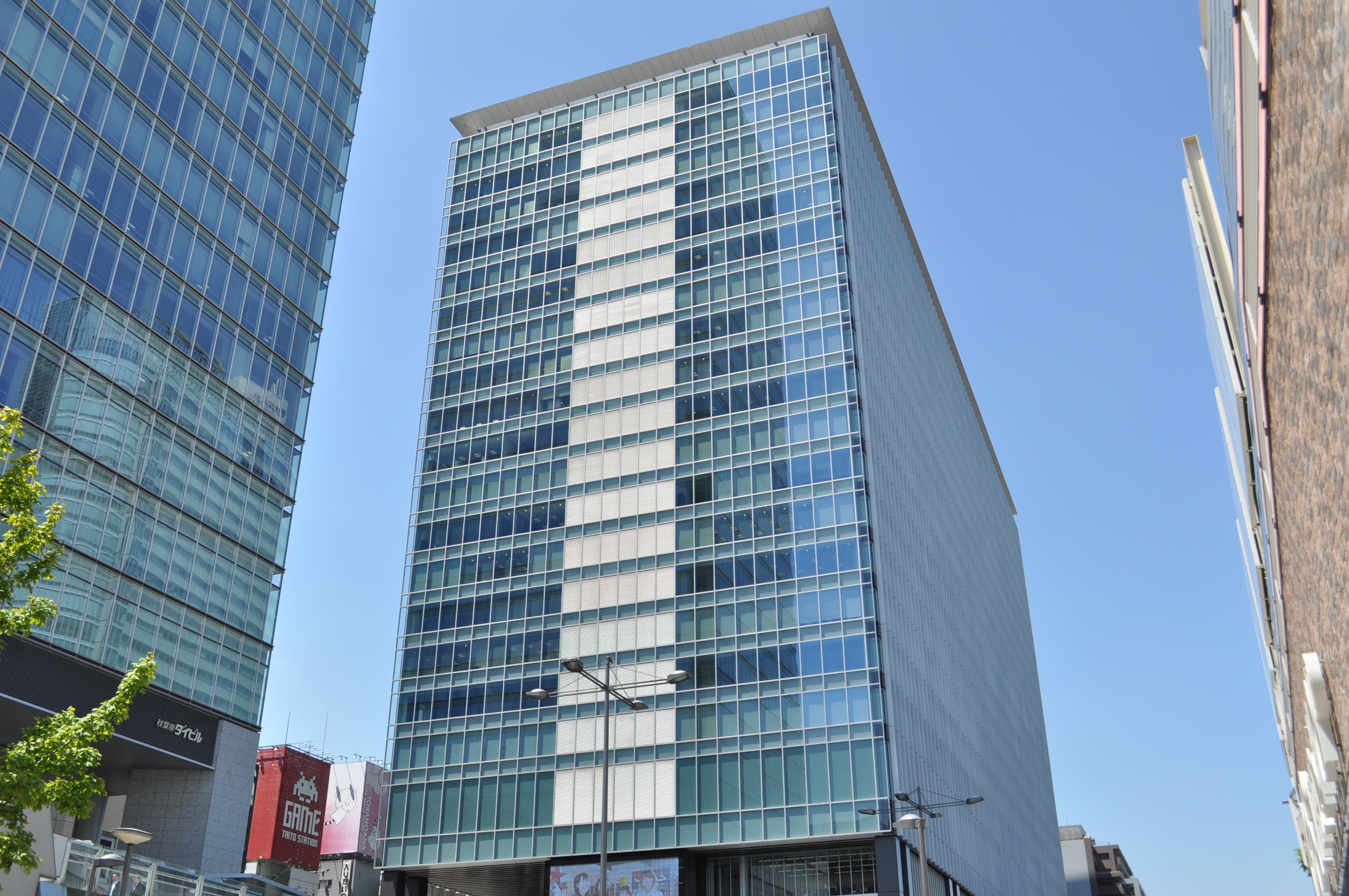
- Company headquarters building
- Native name: DOWAホールディングス株式会社
- Type: Public KK
- Traded as: TYO: 5714; NAG: 5714; FSE: 5714; Nikkei 225 component
- ISIN: JP3638600001
- Industry: Nonferrous metals
- Founded: (September 18, 1884; 142 years ago)
- Founder: Denzaburo Fujita
- Headquarters: Akihabara UDX building, Sotokanda, Chiyoda-ku, Tokyo, 101-0021, Japan
- Area served: Worldwide
- Key people: Akira Sekiguchi (President)
- Products: Nonferrous metals; Electronic materials
- Services: Environmental management & recycling; Metal processing; Heat treatment
- Revenue: ▲JPY 454.7 billion (FY 2017) (US$ 4.2 billion) (FY 2017)
- Net income: ▼JPY 24.6 billion (FY 2017) (US$ 232 million) (FY 2017)
- Number of employees: 6,400 (as of March 31, 2018)
- Subsidiaries: Dowa Metals and Mining; Dowa Eco-System; Dowa Electronics Materials; Dowa Metal Tech; Dowa Thermotech
- Website: hd.dowa.co.jp

Dowa Holdings (DOWAホールディングス株式会社, DOWA Hōrudingusu Kabushiki-gaisha) is a Japanese nonferrous metals manufacturer. The company is a component of the Nikkei 225 stock index.

== History ==
Fujita-gumi, the forerunner of DOWA, was established by three brothers from Yamaguchi prefecture in 1881. The brothers had personal connections with influential members of the government, so in 1884 they bought the Kosaka mine, from which they expanded their business into various fields, centered on the coal mining business. After the purchase, Fujita-gumi increased its capital and invested heavily in skilled labor and equipment. By 1888, the Kosaka mine became Japan's top producer of silver.

In 1900, an engineer at Kosaka succeeded in extracting copper by accessing kuroko (black ore — a mixture of copper, zinc and lead) deep in the mine. After that, Kosaka changed its focus from silver to copper, and in 1907, became Japan's largest copper producer.

Dowa Mining was an early developer of Yuzawa, a hot spring town using geothermal energy, in the late 20th century.

=== Post 2000s ===
As of April 2007, Dowa Holdings was Japan's largest silver smelter.

Dowa Holdings built a recycling plant in Kosaka which has been operating since 2008, extracting minerals and valuable metals from old electronics parts. One of its subsidiaries, Kosaka Smelting and Refining, has reclaimed rare materials including gold, indium, and antimony. In 2010, the company was working on methods to reclaim rare-earth elements, which are harder to mine, such as neodymium and dysprosium.

As of 2010, Dowa was one of the top three zinc producers in Japan. As of 2016, Dowa Holdings possessed the technology for recovering 22 metals, including germanium, ruthenium, gallium, and selenium. In 2017, Dowa Holdings was involved in recycling efforts by sorting through electronics wastes in search for gold, platinum, palladium, and additional rare metals. As of 2018, Dowa Holdings had more than 6,000 employees.

In April 2023, Mitsubishi Materials Corp took full ownership of Onahama Smelting & Refining after purchasing its stake in Dowa Holdings and Furukawa Co.

As of July 2023, Dowa Holdings was the top producer worldwide of high-purity gallium. In 2024, Dowa filed a patent for gold plating. In 2024, Dowa was granted a patent for copper plating.

== Current business ==
Dowa's main business is in the recycling and metal processing. Dowa has six business segments; Environment and Recycling, Smelting & Refining, Electronic Materials, Metal Processing, Heat Treatment, and Other which is real estate leasing, construction, management, and technical support services.

=== Subsidiaries ===
Dowa Holdings has several subsidiaries, including Dowa Eco-System, Dowa Metals and Mining, Dowa Electronics Materials, Dowa Metal Tech, and Dowa Thermotech.

In 2010, Dowa Metals & Mining Co. was the fourth-largest copper smelter in Japan. As of January 2024, the company owned the largest zinc smelter in Japan.

Dowa Eco-System manages waste and recycling in Asia, and runs a plant in Singapore which works to recover precious and nonferrous metals. In 2016, Dowa Eco-System partnered with Padaeng Industry Plc (PDI) to build industrial waste management factories. It developed the technology for Singapore's first vertical waste incinerator.

Dowa Electronics Materials was the largest supplier of indium in Japan as of 2010.

In November 2017, auto supplier Dowa Metal Tech opened an $11 million plant in Guanajuato, Mexico.

Dowa Thermotech manufactures furnaces and provides heat protection treatments. In 2018, it invested $22.5 million to build a plant in North Carolina.

== Partnerships ==
In 1999, Dowa Mining and Inco partnered to extract metals in Turkey and Indonesia.

In 2019, Dowa Holdings and Constantine Metal Resources engaged in a joint venture called the Palmer Project to develop an underground mine in Southeast Alaska. In 2023, an upgrade and expansion drill program began in the project. Dowa Metals & Mining owned 55% of the venture.

== 2020–2022 catalytic converter theft ring ==
Dowa Metals & Mining America was a vital buyer of raw metals supplied by New Jersey-based firm DG Auto Parts LLC. After Dowa evaluated the PRP dust that it received, it would pay its suppliers and refine the dust into chunks in their refinery. The chunks would then be shipped to Tanaka Precious Metals in Akita, where they would be prepared for sale. Between 2018 and 2022, Tanaka Precious Metals' annual revenue increased by approximately 20% to $288 million.

Navin Khanna and Tinu Khanna of DG Auto Parts and co-conspirator Tyler Curtis would later be implicated in a state theft ring, responsible for thousands of catalytic converter thefts across the US. Between March 2021 and April 2022, a total of $224 million was transferred by Dowa into a single account used by DG Auto Parts. A further $175 million was discovered on another account. Over the course of their investigation, police discovered that Dowa Metals & Mining America had paid $545 million in revenue to DG Auto Parts. Despite surveillance and bank records proving Dowa to be the source of DG Auto Parts' money, the company's name was withheld during the indictments against Curtis and the Khannas, only being referred to as an unindicted co-conspirator.

Tulsa street crimes unit supervisor, Lieutenant Brad Staggs stated the indictments had drastically cut the rate of catalytic converter thefts, saying "in the four months prior to that national takedown day, there were 250 reports of catalytic converter theft. In the four months after, there were 38." According to the NICB, by 2023 reports of catalytic converter thefts had declined significantly nationwide. In the first nine months of 2023, there were 2,675 catalytic converter thefts reported per month, down from over 5,000 in 2022.
