= Miyamori Station =

Railway station in Tōno, Iwate Prefecture, Japan

Miyamori Station 宮守駅
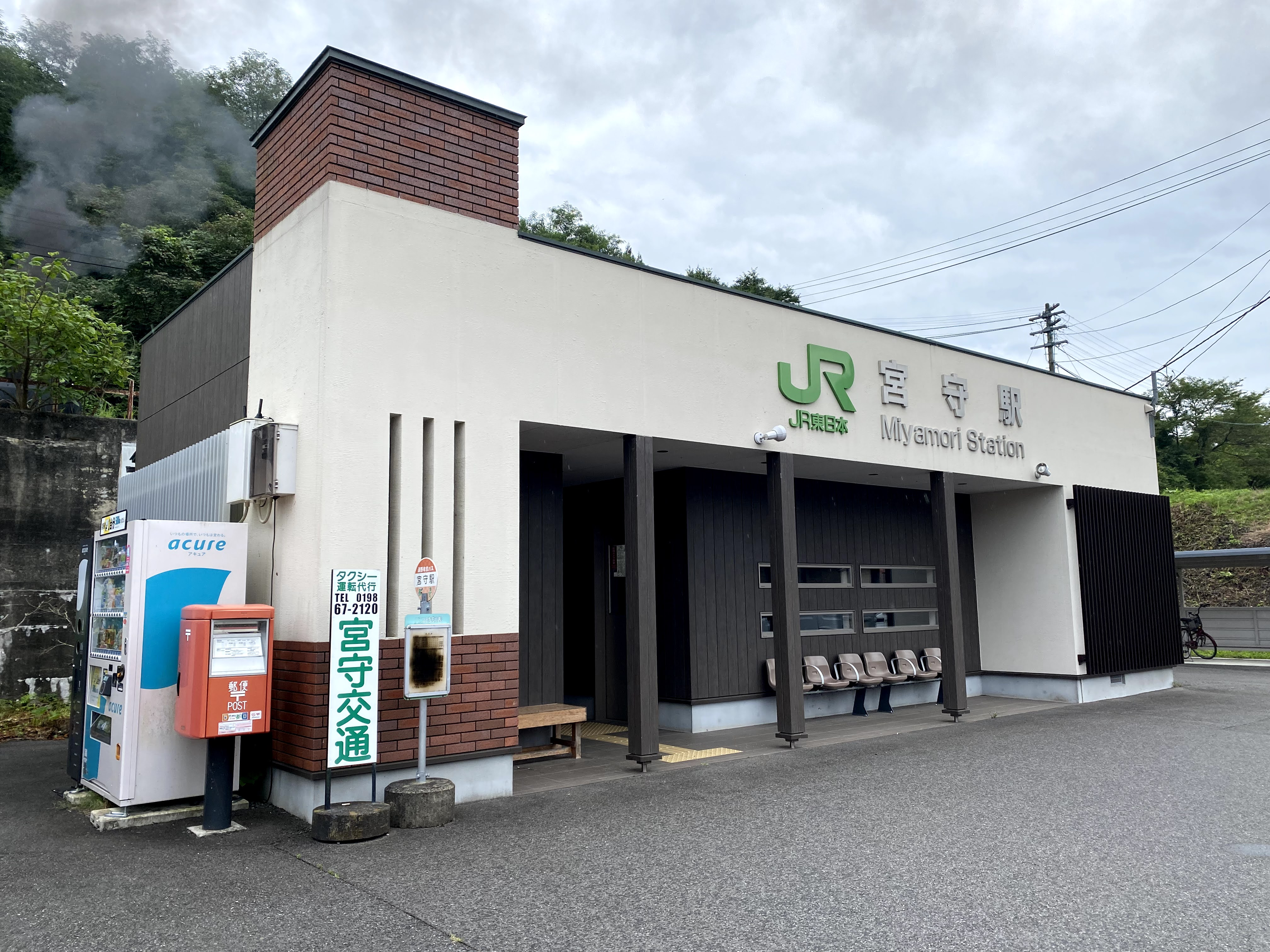
- Miyamori Station, August 2021

General information
- Location: 26 Jiwari 119 Shimomiyamori Miyamori-chō, Tōno-shi, Iwate-ken 028-0304; Japan
- Coordinates: 39.3512°N 141.3505°E
- Operator: JR East
- Line: ■ Kamaishi Line
- Distance: 25.1 km from Hanamaki
- Platforms: 1 island platform
- Tracks: 2

Construction
- Structure type: At grade

Other information
- Status: Unstaffed
- Website: Official website

History
- Opened: 23 November 1915

Passengers
- FY2015: 96

Services
Preceding station	JR East	Following station
Tsuchizawa towards Hanamaki	Kamaishi Line Rapid Hamayuri	Masuzawa (limited service) towards Kamaishi
Iwanebashi towards Hanamaki	Kamaishi Line Local	Kashiwagidaira towards Kamaishi
Location
- Location within Iwate Prefecture Location within Japan

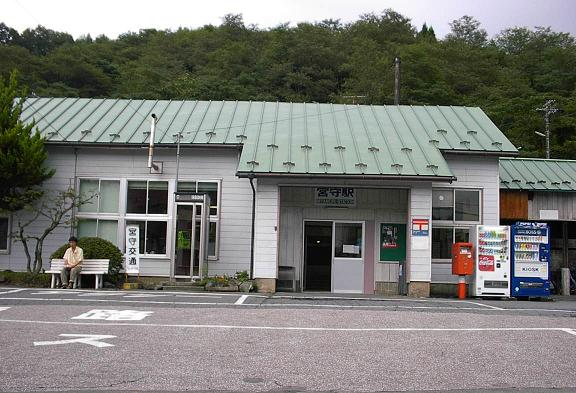
Miyamori station in 2006

Miyamori Station (宮守駅, Miyamori-eki) is a railway station in the city of Tōno, Iwate, Japan, operated by East Japan Railway Company (JR East).

== Lines ==
Miyamori Station is served by the Kamaishi Line, and is located 25.1 rail kilometers from the terminus of the line at Hanamaki Station.

== Station layout ==
The station has one island platform connected to the station building by an underground passage. The station is unattended.

=== Platforms ===
1	■ Kamaishi Line	for Hanamaki and Morioka
2	■ Kamaishi Line	for Tōno and Kamaishi

== History ==
Miyamori Station opened on 23 November 1915 as a station on the Iwate Light Railway (岩手軽便鉄道), a 762 mm (2 ft 6 in) light railway extending 65.4 km from Hanamaki to the now-defunct Sennintōge Station (仙人峠駅). The line was nationalized in 1936, becoming the Kamaishi Line. The station was absorbed into the JR East network upon the privatization of the Japanese National Railways (JNR) on 1 April 1987. A new station building was completed in 2106.

== Surrounding area ==
- Miyamori Post Office
- former Miyamori village hall
- National Route 107
- National Route 283
- National Route 396

== See also ==
- List of railway stations in Japan
