= Dōsen Station =

Railway station in Kamaishi, Iwate Prefecture, Japan

Dōsen Station 洞泉駅
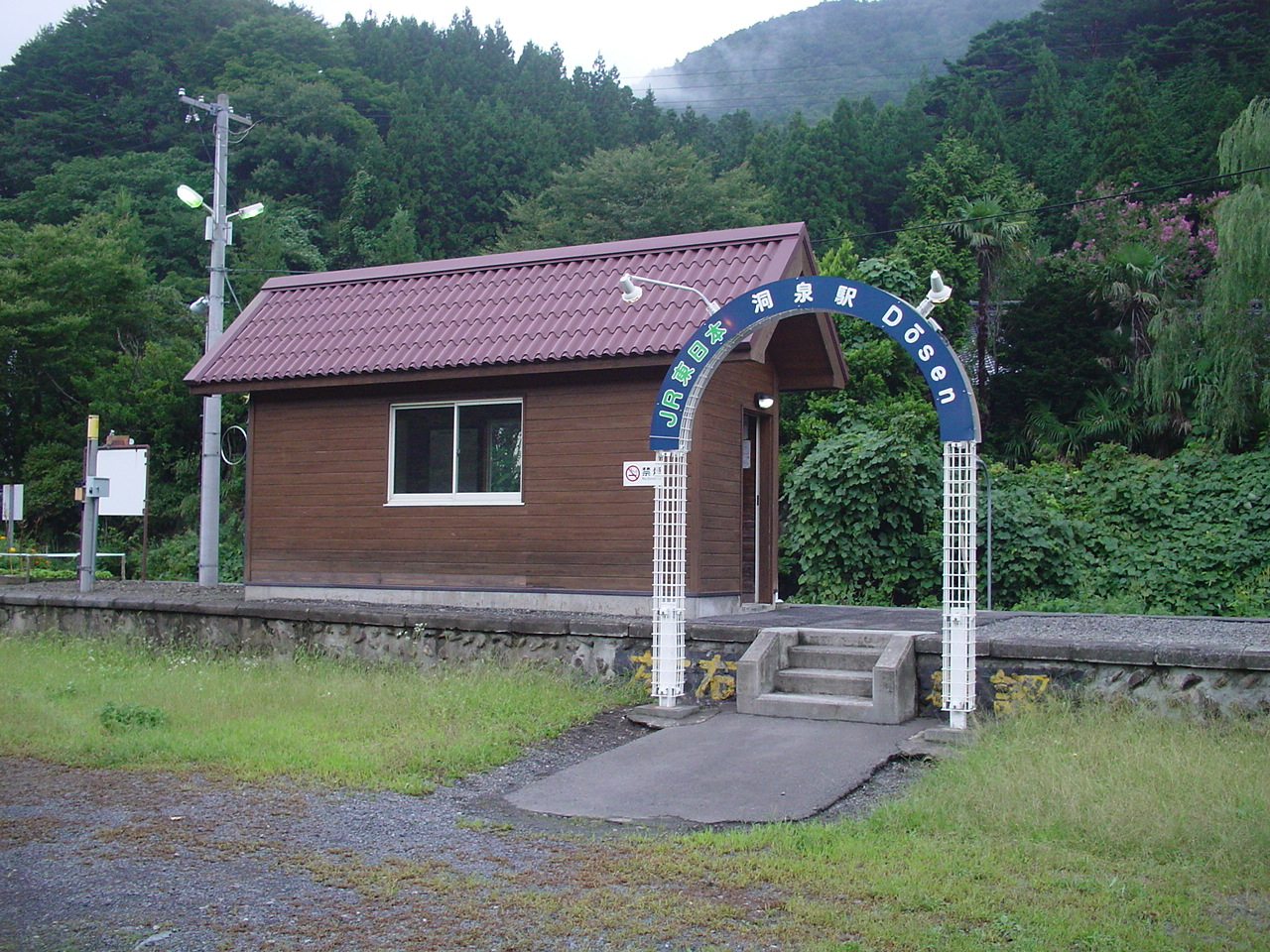
- Dōsen Station in September 2007

General information
- Location: Koshi-cho dai-4 jiwari 195, Kamaishi-shi, Iwate-ken 026-0055; Japan
- Coordinates: 39.2506°N 141.7604°E
- Operator: JR East
- Line: ■ Kamaishi Line
- Distance: 79.6 km from Hanamaki
- Platforms: 1 side platform
- Tracks: 1

Construction
- Structure type: At grade

Other information
- Status: Unstaffed
- Website: Official website

History
- Opened: 15 June 1945

Services
Preceding station	JR East	Following station
Rikuchū-Ōhashi towards Hanamaki	Kamaishi Line Local	Matsukura towards Kamaishi
Location
- Location within Iwate Prefecture Location within Japan

Dōsen Station (洞泉駅, Dōsen-eki) is a railway station in the city of Kamaishi, Iwate, Japan, operated by East Japan Railway Company (JR East).

== Lines ==
Dōsen Station is served by the Kamaishi Line, and is located 79.6 kilometers from the starting point of the line at Hanamaki Station.

== Station layout ==
The station has one side platform serving a single bi-directional track. The station is unattended.

== History ==
Dōsen Station opened on 15 June 1945. The station was absorbed into the JR East network upon the privatization of the Japanese National Railways (JNR) on 1 April 1987.

== Surrounding area ==
- National Route 283
- Dōsen Post Office

== See also ==
- List of railway stations in Japan
