= Kamiarisu Station =

Railway station in Sumita, Iwate Prefecture, Japan

Kamiarisu Station 上有住駅
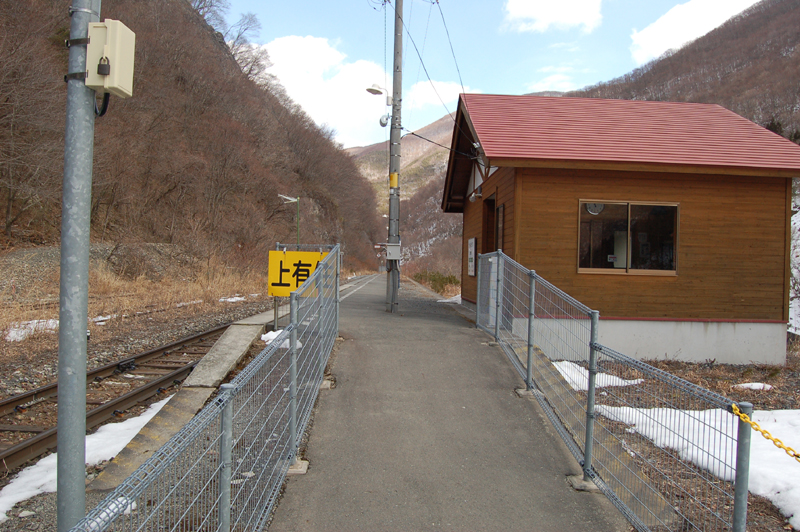
- Kamiarisu Station, April 2009

General information
- Location: Arisu Tsuchikura 298, Sumita-machi, Kesen-gun, Iwate-ken 029-2501; Japan
- Coordinates: 39.2421°N 141.6814°E
- Operator: JR East
- Line: ■ Kamaishi Line
- Distance: 65.4 km from Hanamaki
- Platforms: 1 side platform
- Tracks: 1

Construction
- Structure type: At grade

Other information
- Status: Unstaffed
- Website: Official website

History
- Opened: 10 October 1950

Services
Preceding station	JR East	Following station
Ashigase towards Hanamaki	Kamaishi Line Local	Rikuchū-Ōhashi towards Kamaishi
Location
- Location within Iwate Prefecture Location within Japan

Kamiarisu Station (上有住駅, Kamiarisu-eki) is a railway station in the town of Sumita, Kesen District, Iwate Prefecture, Japan, operated by East Japan Railway Company (JR East).

== Lines ==
Kamiarisu Station is served by the Kamaishi Line, and is located 65.4 rail kilometers from the terminus of the line at Hanamaki Station.

== Station layout ==
The station has one side platform serving a single ground-level bi-directional track. There is no longer a station building, but only a small shelter on the platform. The station is unattended.

== History ==
Kamiarisu Station opened on 10 October 1950. The station was absorbed into the JR East network upon the privatization of the Japanese National Railways (JNR) on 1 April 1987.

== Surrounding area ==
The station is located in an isolated rural area.

- National Route 283
- Rokando Cave

== See also ==
- List of railway stations in Japan
