= Masuzawa Station =

Railway station in Tōno, Iwate Prefecture, Japan

Masuzawa Station 鱒沢駅
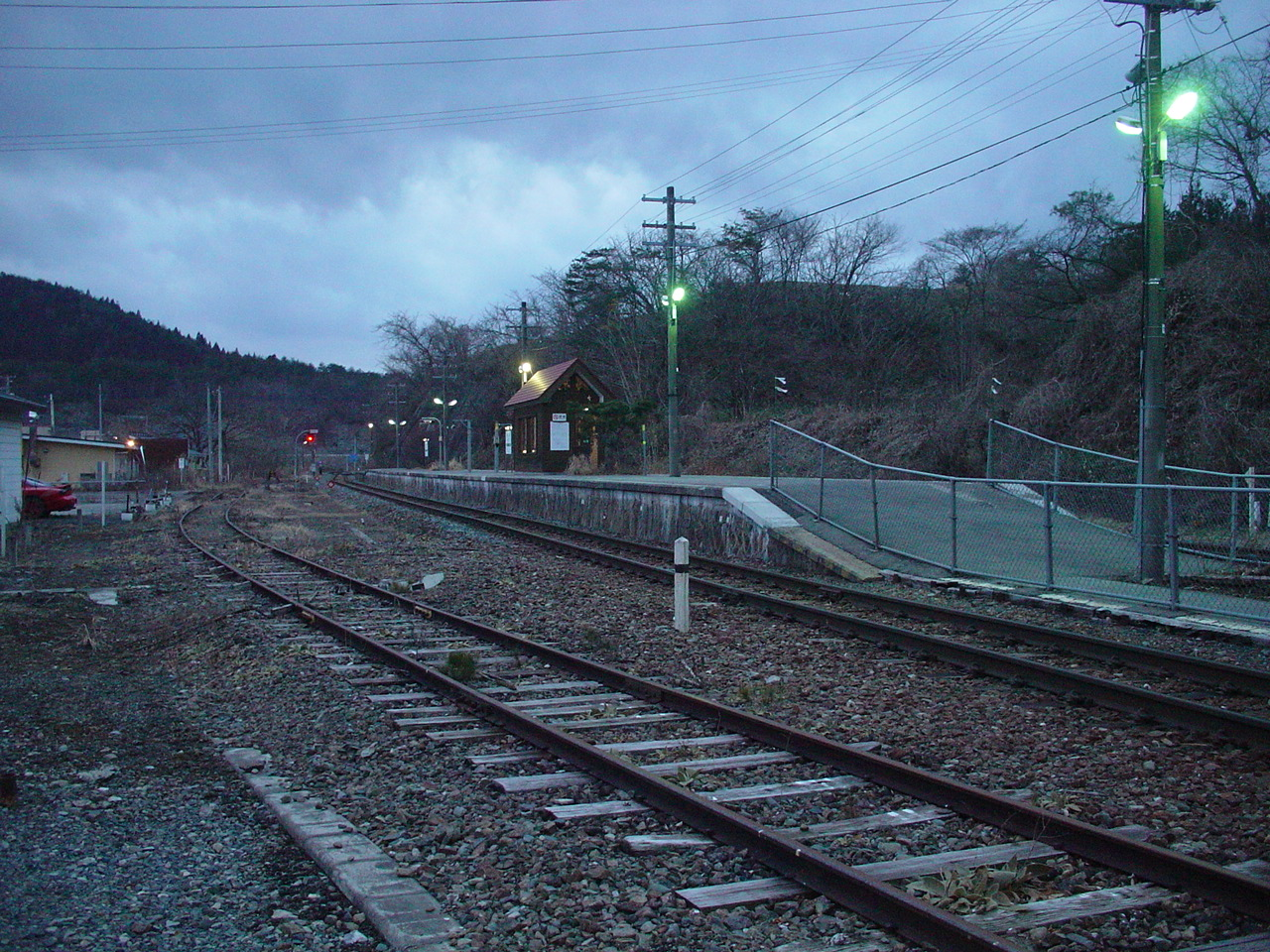
- Masuzawa Station, February 2007

General information
- Location: Shimomasuzawa Miyamori-chō, Tōno-shi, Iwate-ken 028-0303; Japan
- Coordinates: 39.3002°N 141.3993°E
- Operator: JR East
- Line: ■ Kamaishi Line
- Distance: 33.6 km from Hanamaki
- Platforms: 1 island platform
- Tracks: 2

Construction
- Structure type: At grade

Other information
- Status: Unstaffed
- Website: Official website

History
- Opened: 30 July 1915
- Former names: Utō Station (to 1924)

Services
| Preceding station | JR East | Following station |
|---|---|---|
| Miyamori towards Hanamaki | Kamaishi Line Rapid Hamayuri (limited service) | Tōno towards Kamaishi |
| Kashiwagidaira towards Hanamaki | Kamaishi Line Local | Arayamae towards Kamaishi |
Location
- Location within Iwate Prefecture Location within Japan

Masuzawa Station (鱒沢駅, Masuzawa-eki) is a railway station in the city of Tōno, Iwate, Japan, operated by East Japan Railway Company (JR East).

== Lines ==
Masuzawa Station is served by the Kamaishi Line, and is located 33.6 rail kilometers from the terminus of the line at Hanamaki Station.

== Station layout ==
The station has a single island platform connected to the station building by a level crossing. The platforms are not numbered. The station is unattended.

=== Platforms ===
| towards entry | ■ Kamaishi Line | for Tsuchizawa and Hanamaki |
| opposite side | ■ Kamaishi Line | for Tōno and Kamaishi |

== History ==
Masuzawa Station opened on 30 July 1915 as Utō Station (宇洞駅, Utō-eki) on the Iwate Light Railway (岩手軽便鉄道), a 762 mm (2 ft 6 in) light railway extending 65.4 km from Hanamaki to the now-defunct Sennintōge Station (仙人峠駅). The line was nationalized in 1936, becoming the Kamaishi Line. The station was renamed to its present name on 16 December 1924. The station was absorbed into the JR East network upon the privatization of the Japanese National Railways (JNR) on 1 April 1987.

== Surrounding area ==
- National Route 107
- National Route 283
- Sarugaishi River

== See also ==
- List of railway stations in Japan
