= Rikuchū-Ōhashi Station =

Railway station in Kamaishi, Iwate Prefecture, Japan

Rikuchū-Ōhashi Station 陸中大橋駅
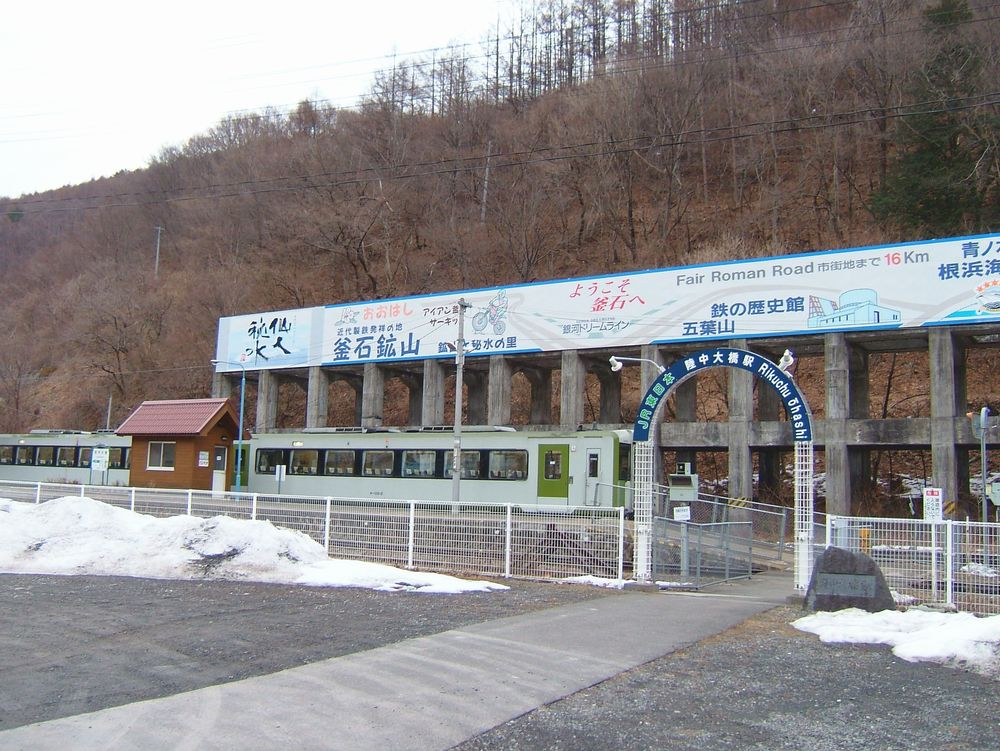
- Rikuchū-Ōhashi Station in January 2007

General information
- Location: Koshi-cho dai-1 jiwari 80, Kamaishi-shi, Iwate-ken 026-0055; Japan
- Coordinates: 39.2803°N 141.7187°E
- Operator: JR East
- Line: ■ Kamaishi Line
- Distance: 73.7 km from Hanamaki
- Platforms: 1 island platform
- Tracks: 2

Construction
- Structure type: At grade

Other information
- Status: Unstaffed
- Website: Official website

History
- Opened: 11 October 1944

Services
Preceding station	JR East	Following station
Kamiarisu towards Hanamaki	Kamaishi Line Local	Dōsen towards Kamaishi
Location
- Location within Iwate Prefecture Location within Japan

Rikuchū-Ōhashi Station (陸中大橋駅, Rikuchū-Ōhashi-eki) is a railway station in the city of Kamaishi, Iwate, Japan, operated by East Japan Railway Company (JR East).

== Lines ==
Rikuchū-Ōhashi Station is served by the Kamaishi Line, and is located 73.7 kilometers from the starting point of the line at Hanamaki Station.

== Station layout ==
The station has a single island platform. There is no longer a station building, but only a small shelter on the platform. The station is unattended.

=== Platforms ===
1	■ Kamaishi Line	for Tōno and Hanamaki
2	■ Kamaishi Line	for Kamaishi and Miyako

== History ==
Rikuchū-Ōhashi Station opened on 11 October 1944. The station was absorbed into the JR East network upon the privatization of the Japanese National Railways (JNR) on 1 April 1987.

== Surrounding area ==
- National Route 283
- Rikuchū-Ōhashi Post Office
- Site of Kamaishi Copper Mine

== See also ==
- List of railway stations in Japan
