= Kashiwagidaira Station =

Railway station in Tōno, Iwate Prefecture, Japan

Kashiwagidaira Station 柏木平駅
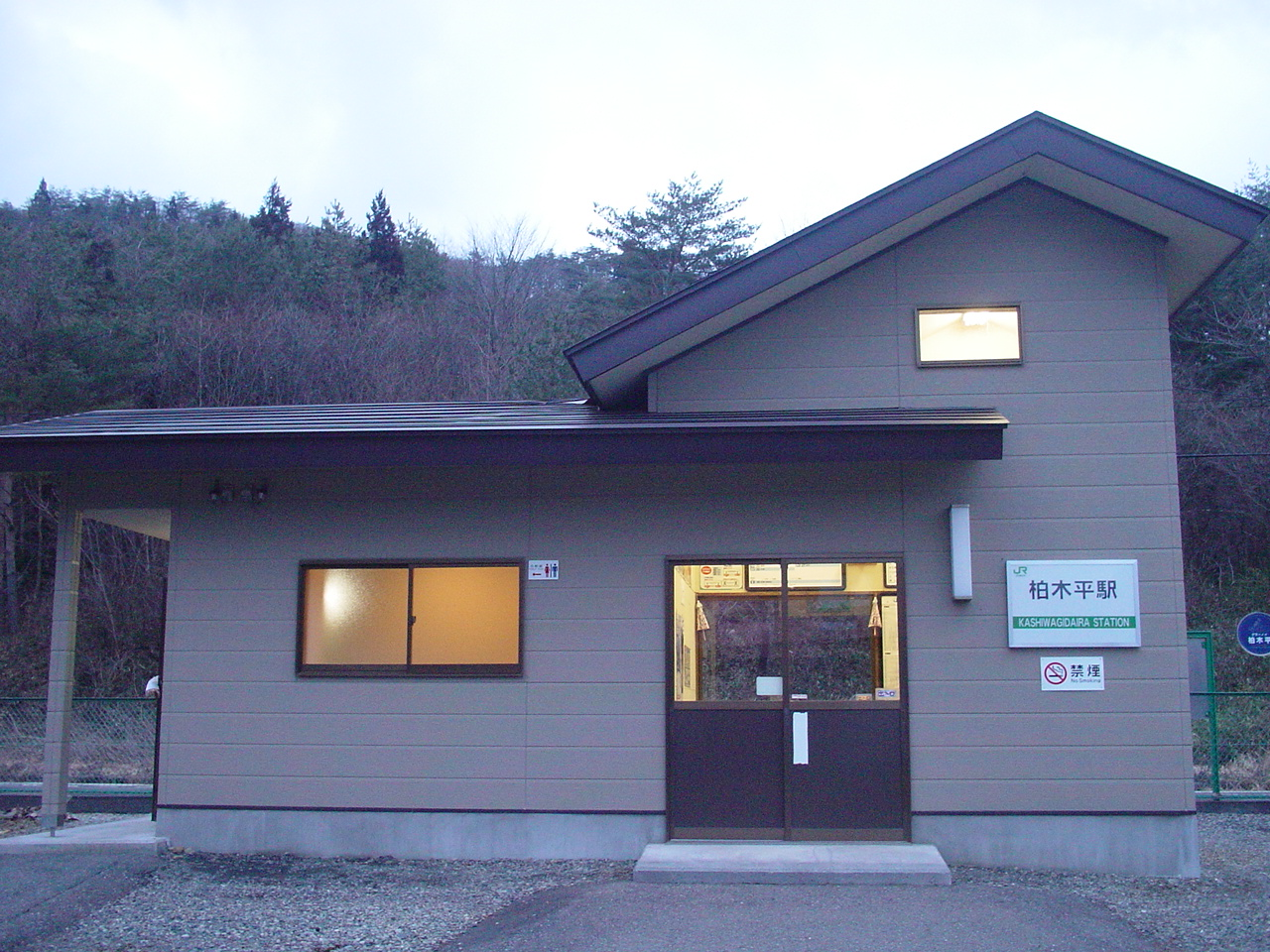
- Kashiwagidaira Station, February 2007

General information
- Location: 45 Shimomasuzawa Miyamori-chō, Tōno-shi, Iwate-ken 028-0303; Japan
- Coordinates: 39.3058°N 141.3798°E
- Operator: JR East
- Line: ■ Kamaishi Line
- Distance: 31.2 km from Hanamaki
- Platforms: 1 side platform
- Tracks: 1

Construction
- Structure type: At grade

Other information
- Status: Unstaffed
- Website: Official website

History
- Opened: 30 July 1915

Services
Preceding station	JR East	Following station
Miyamori towards Hanamaki	Kamaishi Line Local	Masuzawa towards Kamaishi
Location
- Location within Iwate Prefecture Location within Japan

Kashiwagidaira Station (柏木平駅, Kashiwagidaira-eki) is a railway station in the city of Tōno, Iwate, Japan, operated by East Japan Railway Company (JR East).

== Lines ==
Kashiwagidaira Station is served by the Kamaishi Line, and is located 31.2 rail kilometers from the terminus of the line at Hanamaki Station.

== Station layout ==
The station has one side platform serving traffic in both directions. The station is unattended.

== History ==
Kashiwagidaira Station opened on 30 July 1915 as a station on the Iwate Light Railway (岩手軽便鉄道), a 762 mm (2 ft 6 in) light railway extending 65.4 km from Hanamaki to the now-defunct Sennintōge Station (仙人峠駅). The station was absorbed into the JR East network upon the privatization of the Japanese National Railways (JNR) on 1 April 1987.

== Surrounding area ==
- National Route 107
- National Route 283

== See also ==
- List of railway stations in Japan
