= Haruyama Station =

Railway station in Hanamaki, Iwate Prefecture, Japan

Haruyama Station 晴山駅
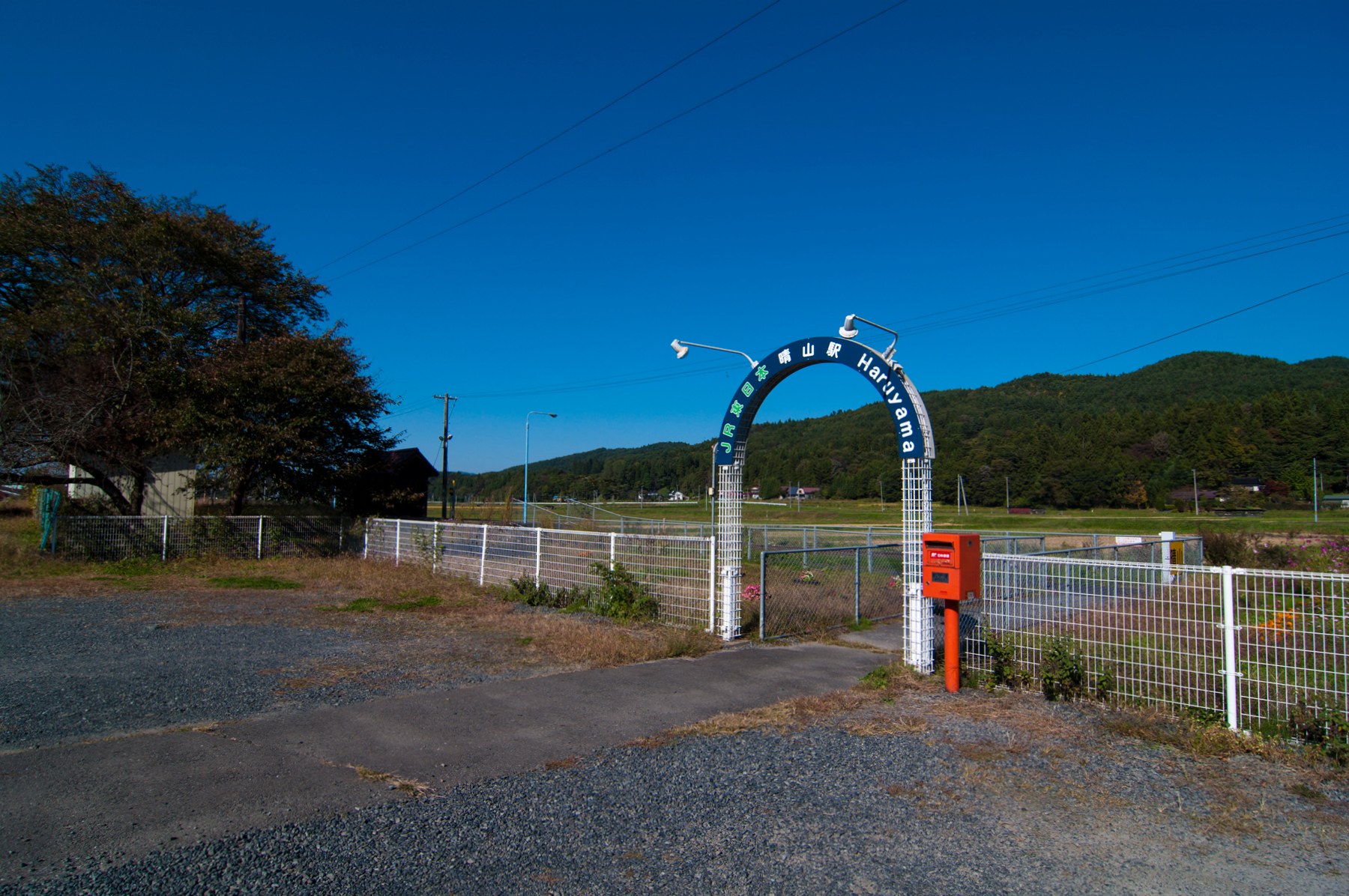
- Haruyama Station, October 2010

General information
- Location: Higashiharuyama Tōwa-chō, Hanamaki-shi, Iwate-ken 028-0113; Japan
- Coordinates: 39.3665°N 141.2577°E
- Operator: JR East
- Line: ■ Kamaishi Line
- Distance: 15.9 km from Hanamaki
- Platforms: 1 side platform
- Tracks: 1

Construction
- Structure type: At grade

Other information
- Status: Unstaffed
- Website: Official website

History
- Opened: 16 April 1914

Services
| Preceding station | JR East | Following station |
|---|---|---|
| Tsuchizawa towards Hanamaki | Kamaishi Line Local | Iwanebashi towards Kamaishi |
Location
- Location within Iwate Prefecture Location within Japan

Haruyama Station (晴山駅, Haruyama-eki) is a railway station in the city of Hanamaki, Iwate, Japan, operated by East Japan Railway Company (JR East).

== Lines ==
Haruyama Station is served by the Kamaishi Line, and is located 15.9 rail kilometers from the terminus of the line at Hanamaki Station.

== Station layout ==
The station has one side platform serving a single-bi-directional track. The station is unattended.

== History ==
Haruyama Station opened on 16 April 1914 as a station on the Iwate Light Railway (岩手軽便鉄道), a 762 mm (2 ft 6 in) light railway extending 65.4 km from Hanamaki to the now-defunct Sennintōge Station (仙人峠駅). The line was nationalized in 1936, becoming the Kamaishi Line.. The station was absorbed into the JR East network upon the privatization of the Japanese National Railways (JNR) on 1 April 1987.

== Surrounding area ==
The station is located in an isolated rural area.

- Nanbu Magari House (National ICP)

== See also ==
- List of railway stations in Japan
