= Ōhashi Station (disambiguation) =

Ōhashi Station (大橋駅, Ōhashi-eki) may refer to:

- Ōhashi Station, on the Nishitetsu Tenjin Ōmuta Line in Minami-ku, Fukuoka, Fukuoka Prefecture, Japan
- Ōhashi Station (Nagasaki), on the Nagasaki Electric Tramway Routes 1・2・3 in Nagasaki, Nagasaki Prefecture, Japan
- Ōhashi Station (Ibaraki), on the discontinued Hitachi Electric Railway Line in Hitachi, Ibaraki Prefecture, Japan
- Ōhashi Station (Kamaishi), on the discontinued Kamaishi Mining Railway in Kamaishi, Iwate Prefecture, Japan
- Ōhashi Station (Tokyo), on the discontinued Tōkyū Tamagawa Line (tramway) in Setagaya, Tokyo, Japan

Other stations with similar names include:

- Rikuchū-Ōhashi Station (陸中大橋駅), on the JR East Kamaishi Line in Kamaishi, Iwate Prefecture, Japan
- Ikejiri-Ōhashi Station (池尻大橋駅), on the Tōkyū Den-en-toshi Line that replaced Ōhashi Station (Tokyo) above
