= Tsuchizawa Station =

Railway station in Hanamaki, Iwate Prefecture, Japan

Tsuchizawa Station 土沢駅
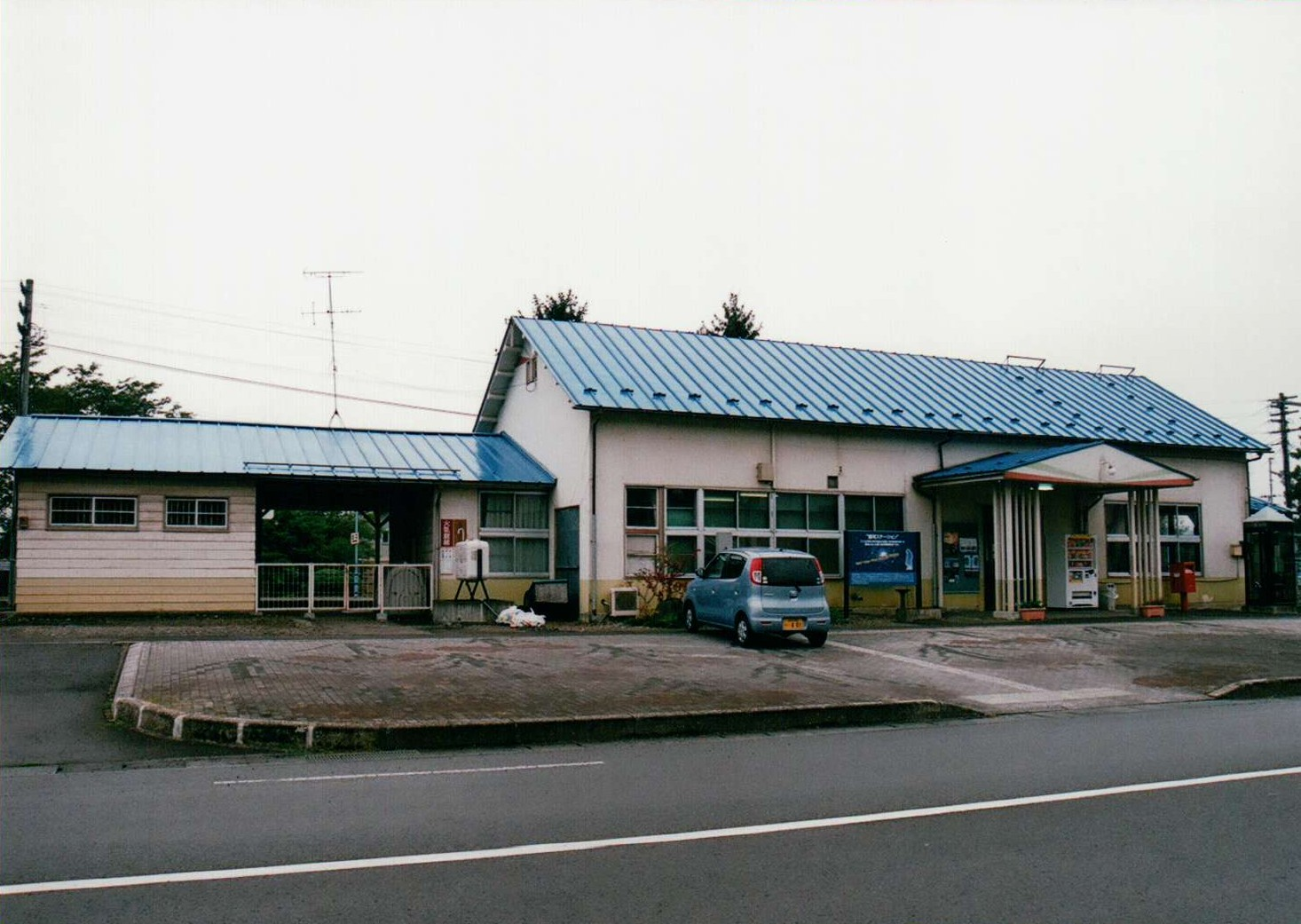
- Tsuchizawa Station, September 2009

General information
- Location: 8-446 Tsuchizawa Tōwa-chō, Hanamak-shi, Iwate-ken 028-0114; Japan
- Coordinates: 39.3834°N 141.2322°E
- Operator: JR East
- Line: ■ Kamaishi Line
- Distance: 15.9 km from Hanamaki
- Platforms: 2 side platforms
- Tracks: 2

Construction
- Structure type: At grade

Other information
- Status: Unstaffed
- Website: Official website

History
- Opened: 24 October 1913

Passengers
- FY2017: 168

Services
Preceding station	JR East	Following station
Shin-Hanamaki towards Hanamaki	Kamaishi Line Rapid Hamayuri	Miyamori towards Kamaishi
Oyamada towards Hanamaki	Kamaishi Line Local	Haruyama towards Kamaishi
Location
- Location within Iwate Prefecture Location within Japan

Tsuchizawa Station (土沢駅, Tsuchizawa-eki) is a railway station in the city of Hanamaki, Iwate, Japan, operated by East Japan Railway Company (JR East).

== Lines ==
Tsuchizawa Station is served by the Kamaishi Line, and is located 15.9 rail kilometers from the terminus of the line at Hanamaki Station.

== Station layout ==
The station has two opposed ground-level side platforms connected to the station building by a level crossing. The station is unattended.

=== Platforms ===
1	■ Kamaishi Line	for Tōno and Kamaishi
2	■ Kamaishi Line	for Hanamaki and Morioka

== History ==
Tsuchizawa Station opened on 24 October 1913 as a station on the Iwate Light Railway (岩手軽便鉄道), a 762 mm (2 ft 6 in) light railway extending 65.4 km from Hanamaki to the now-defunct Sennintōge Station (仙人峠駅). The line was nationalized in 1936, becoming the Kamaishi Line. The station was absorbed into the JR East network upon the privatization of the Japanese National Railways (JNR) on 1 April 1987.

== Passenger statistics ==
In fiscal 2017, the station was used by an average of 168 passengers daily (boarding passengers only).

== Surrounding area ==
- Tetsugoro Yorozu Memorial Museum
- Tōwa Post Office
- National Route 283
- National Route 456

== See also ==
- List of railway stations in Japan
