= Masuzawa =

Masuzawa may refer to:

- Tomoko Masuzawa, Professor of History and Comparative Literature at the University of Michigan
- 9216 Masuzawa, a minor planet named after Hitoshi Masuzawa, a lecturer and curator of the Gotoh Planetarium and Astronomical Museum in Tokyo
- Masuzawa Station, a railway station in the city of Tōno, Iwate, Japan
