= Tōno, Iwate =

Tōno 遠野市
- City
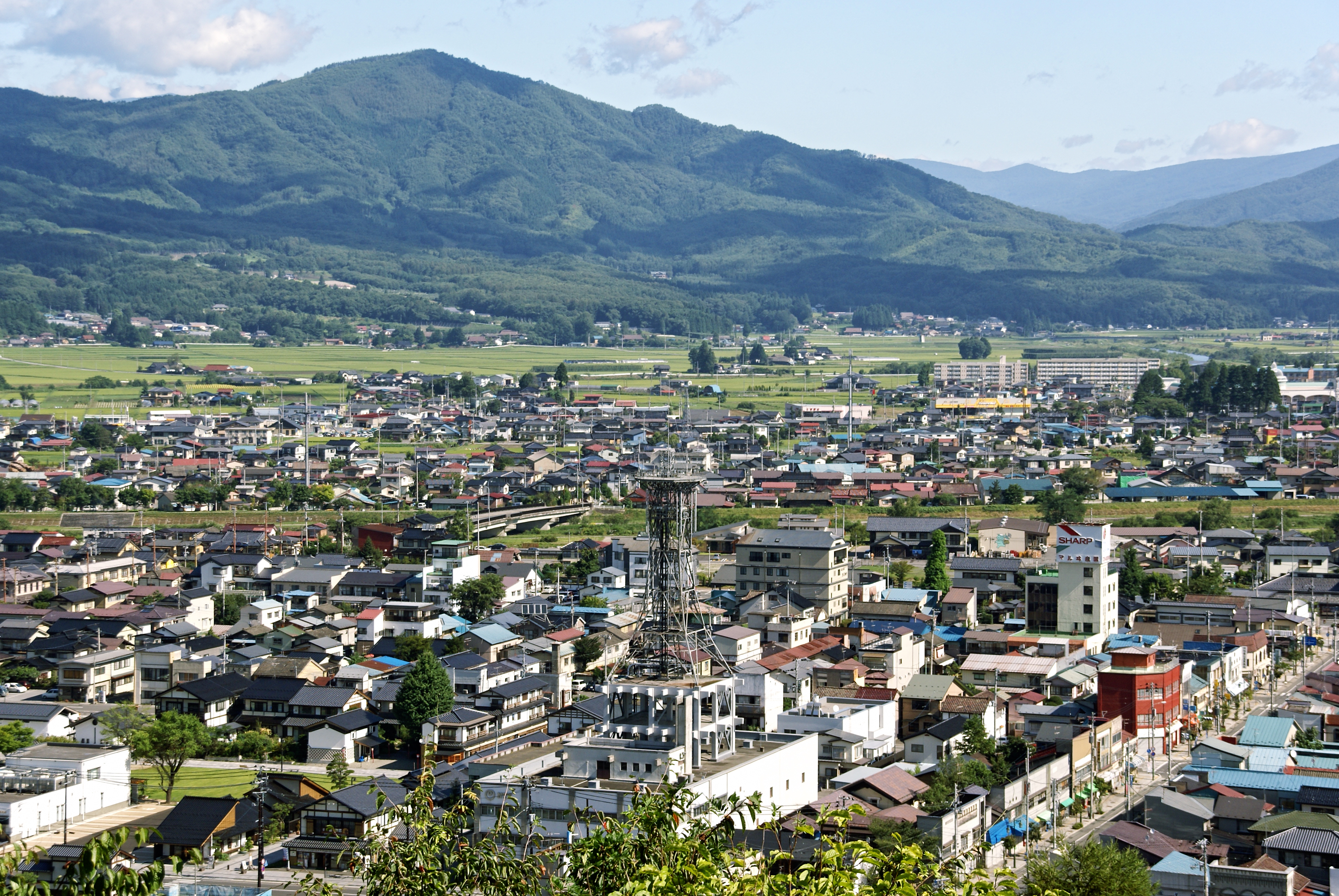
- Tōno City

- Flag Seal
- Location of Tōno in Iwate Prefecture

- Coordinates: 39°19′40.4″N 141°32′0.1″E
- Country: Japan
- Region: Tōhoku
- Prefecture: Iwate

Government
  - Mayor: Tada Kazuhiko (October 2021)

Area
  - Total: 825.97 km^{2} (318.91 sq mi)

Population (January 1, 2020)
  - Total: 26,110
  - Density: 31.61/km^{2} (81.87/sq mi)
- Time zone: UTC+9 (Japan Standard Time)
- Tree: Spreading Yew
- Flower: Yamayuri
- Bird: Copper pheasant
- Phone number: 0198-62-2111
- Address: 8-12 Higashidate-chō, Tōno-shi 028-0592
- Website: Official website

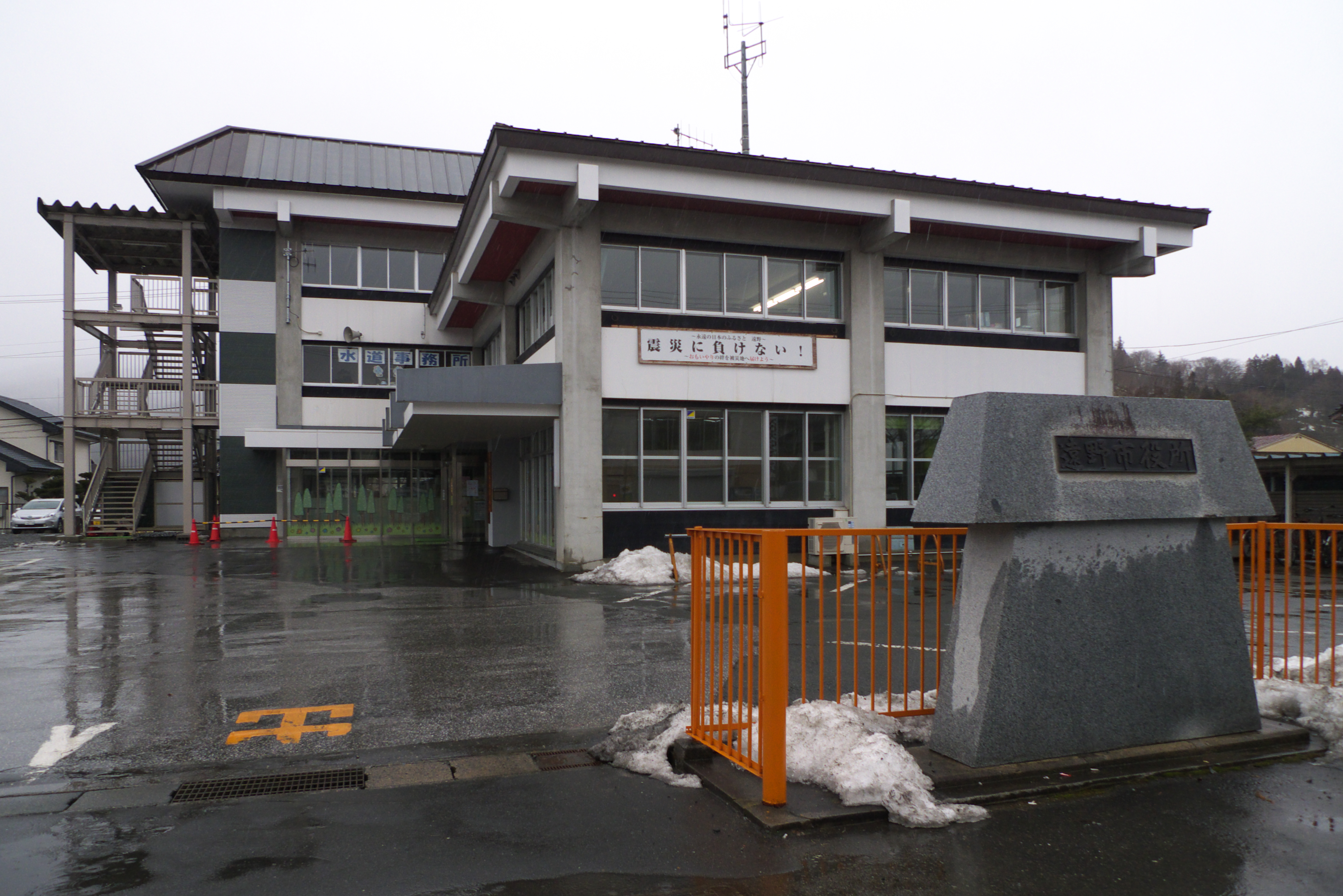
Tōno City Hall

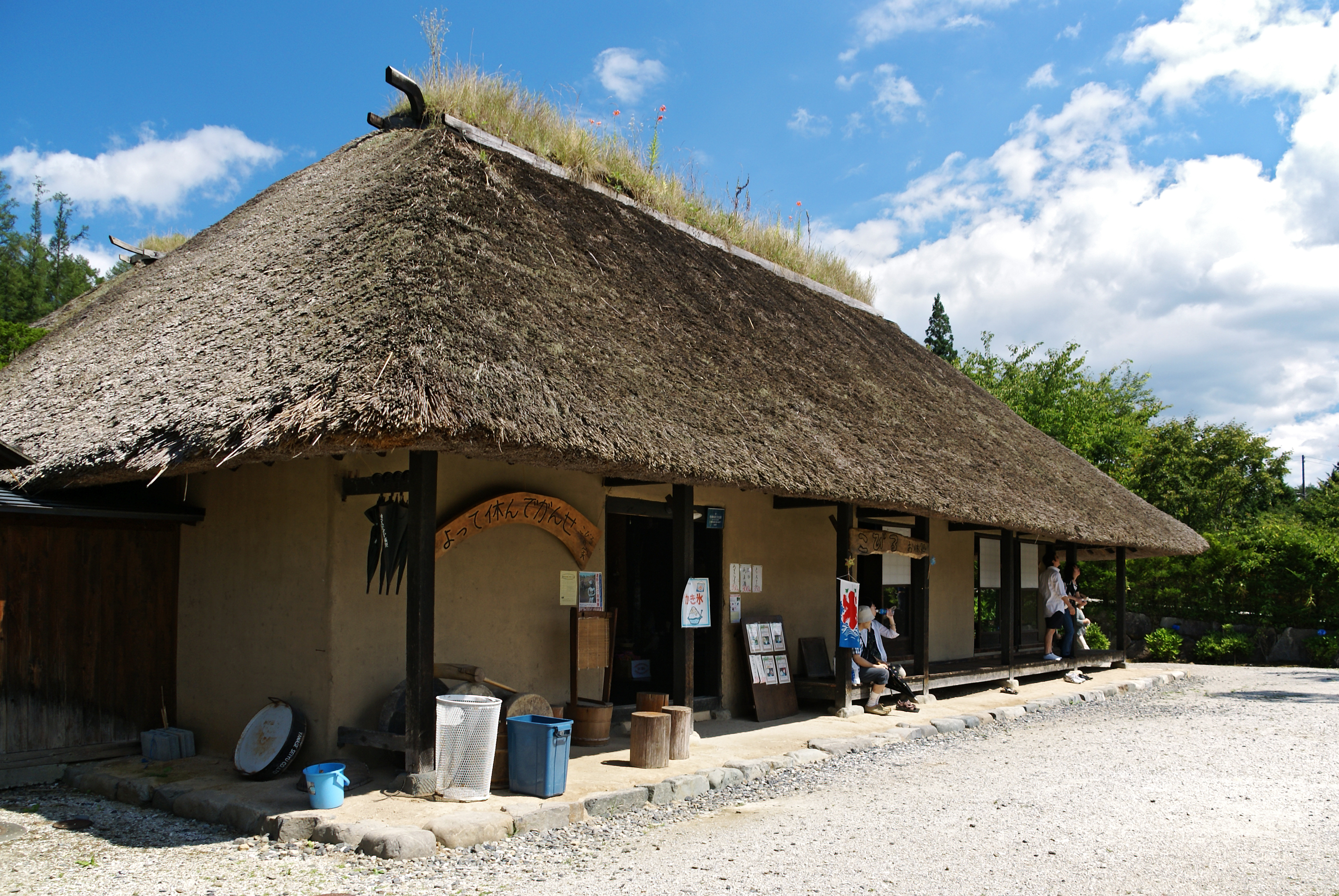
Thatched roof in Tono Furusato Village, a sightseeing spot in Tōno

Tōno (遠野市, Tōno-shi) is a city in Iwate Prefecture, Japan. As of 1 January 2020, the city had an estimated population of 26,378, and a population density of 31.6 persons per km^{2} in 10,759 households. The total area of the city is 825.97 square kilometres (318.91 sq mi). Tōno is known as "The City of Folklore" for its rural nature, its preservation of traditional culture and especially for the collection of folktales, Tōno Monogatari, written by Kunio Yanagita in 1910.

== Geography ==
Tōno is located in central Iwate Prefecture, in the floodplain of the Sarugaishi River, surrounded by a ring of mountains. Mount Hayachine sits at the northernmost point of the city where Hanamaki, Kawai and Tōno meet. At 1,914 meters it is also the city's highest point. Mt. Rokkoushi, (1,294 meters) dominates the landscape to the east and Mt. Ishigami (1,038 meters) is the highest mountain in the west. Together these peaks form Tōno's "big three" mountains. The highest points in southern Tōno are Mt. Sadato (884 meters) on the border of Sumida and Mt. Tane (871 meters) on the borders of Sumita and Ōshū.

Accordingly, to legend, in the past the hills in Miyamori blocked the Sarugaishi River creating a large lake in the Tōno area. Miyamori itself is characterized by a series of valleys to the west of Mt. Ishigami that flow west into the Sarugaishi River just below the Tase Dam.

=== Neighboring municipalities ===
- Iwate Prefecture
  - Hanamaki
  - Kamaishi
  - Miyako
  - Ōshū
  - Ōtsuchi
  - Sumita

== Climate ==
Tōno has a humid subtropical climate (Köppen Cfa) characterized by mild summers and cold winters. The average annual temperature in Tōno is 9.6 °C. The average annual rainfall is 1388 mm with September as the wettest month and February as the driest month. The temperatures are highest on average in August, at around 22.6 °C, and lowest in January, at around -2.2 °C.

Climate data for Tōno (elevation 275 m, 1991–2020 normals, extremes 1976–present)
Month	Jan	Feb	Mar	Apr	May	Jun	Jul	Aug	Sep	Oct	Nov	Dec	Year
Record high °C (°F)	12.5 (54.5)	17.2 (63.0)	20.5 (68.9)	28.1 (82.6)	32.4 (90.3)	33.7 (92.7)	35.3 (95.5)	36.5 (97.7)	33.9 (93.0)	27.8 (82.0)	24.2 (75.6)	17.6 (63.7)	36.5 (97.7)
Mean daily maximum °C (°F)	1.7 (35.1)	2.7 (36.9)	7.1 (44.8)	14.0 (57.2)	20.0 (68.0)	23.5 (74.3)	26.8 (80.2)	28.0 (82.4)	23.7 (74.7)	17.7 (63.9)	11.0 (51.8)	4.3 (39.7)	15.0 (59.0)
Daily mean °C (°F)	−2.4 (27.7)	−1.8 (28.8)	1.9 (35.4)	7.8 (46.0)	13.7 (56.7)	17.9 (64.2)	21.8 (71.2)	22.7 (72.9)	18.5 (65.3)	11.8 (53.2)	5.5 (41.9)	0.2 (32.4)	9.8 (49.6)
Mean daily minimum °C (°F)	−6.9 (19.6)	−6.6 (20.1)	−3.1 (26.4)	1.8 (35.2)	7.8 (46.0)	13.3 (55.9)	17.9 (64.2)	18.7 (65.7)	14.2 (57.6)	6.8 (44.2)	0.5 (32.9)	−3.7 (25.3)	5.1 (41.2)
Record low °C (°F)	−22.3 (−8.1)	−22.5 (−8.5)	−16.8 (1.8)	−9.3 (15.3)	−1.9 (28.6)	2.0 (35.6)	6.6 (43.9)	7.3 (45.1)	1.6 (34.9)	−3.8 (25.2)	−9.1 (15.6)	−18.7 (−1.7)	−22.5 (−8.5)
Average precipitation mm (inches)	43.3 (1.70)	36.9 (1.45)	72.9 (2.87)	85.6 (3.37)	102.7 (4.04)	110.5 (4.35)	170.1 (6.70)	162.1 (6.38)	151.8 (5.98)	113.0 (4.45)	68.2 (2.69)	58.0 (2.28)	1,175.1 (46.26)
Average snowfall cm (inches)	86 (34)	70 (28)	36 (14)	2 (0.8)	0 (0)	0 (0)	0 (0)	0 (0)	0 (0)	0 (0)	3 (1.2)	46 (18)	243 (96)
Average precipitation days (≥ 1.0 mm)	9.9	8.5	10.7	10.4	10.9	9.9	13.0	10.9	11.8	11.2	10.9	10.6	128.7
Mean monthly sunshine hours	99.7	103.3	143.7	169.8	178.6	148.7	127.9	144.7	123.2	130.1	117.8	92.6	1,580.1
Source: Japan Meteorological Agency

== Demographics ==
Per Japanese census data, the population of Tōno peaked around the year 1960 and has declined steadily over the past 60 years. It is now less than it was a century ago. Per official data from Tōno city hall, 37.6% of the population is over the age of 65.

Historical population
Year	Pop.	±%
1920	31,621	—
1930	34,169	+8.1%
1940	35,517	+3.9%
1950	45,068	+26.9%
1960	46,281	+2.7%
1970	40,768	−11.9%
1980	37,382	−8.3%
1990	34,926	−6.6%
2000	33,108	−5.2%
2010	29,338	−11.4%
2020	25,366	−13.5%

== History ==
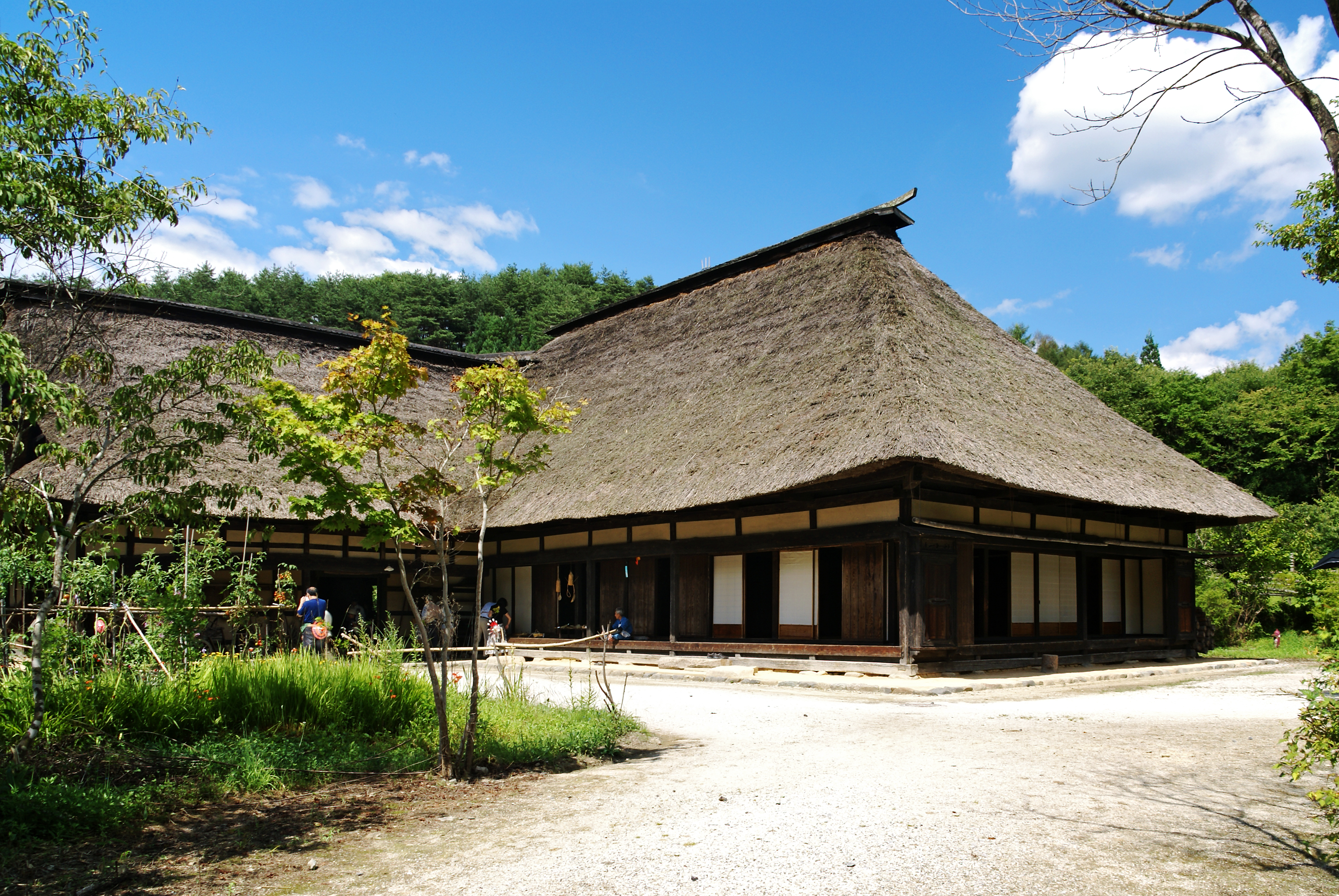
Tono Furusato-mura in Tōno

The area of present-day Tōno was part of ancient Mutsu Province, and has been settled since at least the Jōmon period. Pottery fragments can still be found in farmers' fields and other places. Later the area was inhabited by the Emishi and many place names are based on the Ainu language. In the Early Nine-Years War lasting from 1051 to 1063, Minamoto no Yoshiie fought running battles with Abe no Sadato throughout the area. There are references to this in "Tōno Monogatari" and arrowheads still turn up from time to time. Later the Hiraizumi Fujiwara controlled Tōno which was a prized area for horse breeding, farming and hunting.

During the Sengoku period, the area was dominated by various samurai clans before coming under the control of the Nambu clan during the Edo period, who ruled Morioka Domain under the Tokugawa shogunate. The Nambu built Nabekura Castle in what is now known as Nabekura Park in downtown Tōno as a defence against the powerful Date clan of Sendai Domain to then south, and assigned to Nanbu Naoyoshi, formerly castellan of Ne Castle near Hachinohe in 1627. This formed an unofficial subsidiary 12,500 koku domain of Morioka Domain, which lasted until the Meiji restoration.

With the Meiji period establishment of the modern municipalities system, the town of Tōno was established on April 1, 1889 within Nishihei District of Iwate Prefecture. In 1896, Nishihei and Minamihei districts were merged to form Kamihei District. During the Meiji period, Tōno developed a silk and cotton weaving industry dependent on Morioka. The silk industry was destroyed by intensely cold weather during the winter of 1905–06. The residents of Tōno were reduced to eating wild roots by the famine of this period and many died or moved away.

The city of Tōno was officially founded on December 1, 1954 by the merger of the former town of Tōno with the seven villages of Ayaori, Otomo, Tsukimoushi, Matsuzaki, Tsuchibuchi, Aozasa and Kamigo.

On October 1, 2005, the village of Miyamori (from Kamihei District) was merged into Tōno to bring the city to its present boundaries.

== Government ==
Tōno has a mayor-council form of government with a directly elected mayor and a unicameral city legislature of eighteen members. Tōno contributes one seat to the Iwate Prefectural legislature. In terms of national politics, the city is part of Iwate 3rd district of the lower house of the Diet of Japan.

== Education ==
There are two senior high schools in Tōno, under the purview of Iwate's Prefectural Board of Education. Iwate Prefectural Tōno Senior High School offers an academic curriculum, while Iwate Prefectural Tōno Ryokuhō Senior High School is vocational.

The Tōno city board of education operates three junior high schools: Tōno, Tōno-Higashi, and Tōno-Nishi, and 11 elementary schools: Aozasa, Ayaori, Kamigō, Masuzawa, Miyamori, Otomo, Tassobe, Tōno, Tōno North, Tsuchibuchi, and Tsukimoushi.

== Transportation ==
=== Railway ===
East Japan Railway Company (JR East) - Kamaishi Line

- Iwanebashi - Miyamori - Kashiwagidaira - Masuzawa - Arayamae - Iwate-Futsukamachi - Ayaori - Tōno - Aozasa - Iwate-Kamigō - Hirakura - Ashigase

=== Highway ===
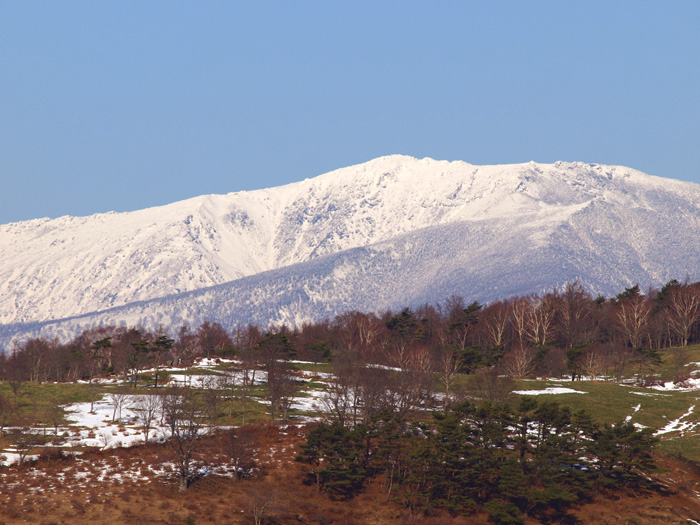
Mt. Hayachine as seen from Mt. Takashimizu in November 2009

- Kamaishi Expressway
- National Route 107
- National Route 283
- National Route 340
- National Route 396

== Local attractions ==
=== Overview ===
The city has a number of sightseeing spots, such as Kappabuchi, a pool where the mythical creatures called kappa are said to live. Tōno Furusato Village preserves several magariya, or L-shaped houses, from the 18th and 19th centuries. The Chiba Family House is another large magariya that is preserved in Tōno as a museum.

Tōno's food includes Genghis Khan or barbecued lamb and hittsumi or wheat dumplings as well as horse meat. The Miyamori part of Tōno is known for its wasabi production and a local brewery makes a wasabi beer.

Festivals include the Tōno Folktales Festival in early February, in which local storytellers recite stories from the Tōno Monogatari. The Tōno Tanabata Festival is held in early August and features a parade of dancers through the city center. In mid-September is the Tōno Festival which also features a parade and yabusame or horseback archery.

=== Locations ===
- Tōno Furusato Village - is collection of magariya type houses from the 18th and 19th centuries that have been relocated to this site. There are seasonal events and entertainments provided during peak vacation times. There is also a restaurant, gift shop, library and museum of natural history.
- Chiba Family Nanbu Magariya - is a large 200-year-old farmhouse which is still occupied but open for tourists as well.
- Denshoen - is a group of buildings including the Kikuchi Family Magariya and the Sasaki Kizen Memorial Museum. The Oshirado Hall enshrines 1,000 Oshira-sama deities.
- Tōno Castle Town Materials Museum - is dedicated to preserving artifacts from the Nanbu clan when Tōno was a prosperous castle town. There are kimono, netsuke, swords and so forth on display.
- Fukusen-ji Temple - is a Shingon Buddhist temple housing the largest wooden Kannon statue in Japan. The grounds of the temple are quite extensive and have many buildings including a five-story pagoda.
- Tōno Kura no Michi Gallery - is a collection of old "kura" or storehouses that have been made into an art gallery, gift shop and toy museum.
- Kappabuchi - is a pool behind Joken-ji Temple which is said to be the home of many "kappa" or mythical water sprites.
- Denderano - is a hut far from any houses where the elderly were brought to die in ages past, for they were seen by their children as no longer productive. The landscape where the huts were is called Dendera Field.
- 500 Buddhist Disciples - are a group of carvings on granite rocks done by a priest of Daiji-ji Temple to commemorate the victims of a famine.
- Arakawa-kōgen Farm - an Important Cultural Landscape

=== Events ===
- Tōno Folktales Festival - in early February - in which storytellers recite tales from Tōno Monogatari.
- Tōno Machiya Doll Festival - from late February through early March - in which traditional dolls are displayed in shops and museums throughout the city.
- Tōno Cherry Blossom Festival - in early May - in which the cherries bloom and everyone parties under the blossoms.
- Tōno Horsepower Tournament - on the 4th Sunday in June - in which draft animals compete in pulling heavy loads.
- Manuke-bushi Festival - in early August - is a humorous dance held on the streets of Tōno.
- Tōno Tanabata Festival - in early August - is a dance and parade that starts in front of the station and goes through the city.
- Tōno Fireworks Festival - on August 15 - is fireworks.
- Tōno Festival - in mid-September - is another dance and parade through the city streets celebrating the harvest.
- Tōno Dobekko Festival - every weekend from late November to early March - is a chance to drink moonshine legally.

=== Folklore ===
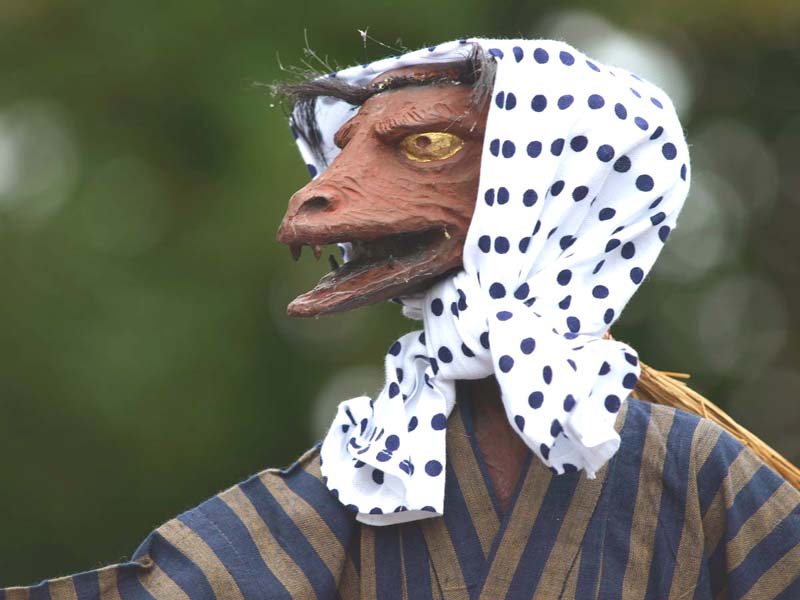
A kappa sculpture in front of JR Tōno Station

Tōno is known throughout Japan as the cradle of Tōno Monogatari (Tales of Tōno), written in 1910 by Kunio Yanagita, who gathered folk tales of the area. This book is now considered one of the greatest studies of Japanese folklore, and inspired the 1982 movie of the same name.

Several of these tales involve the Kappa, mischievous water sprites. A legendary location in Tōno is the Kappa-buchi, a water stream where kappas are said to live.

The mascot of the city, Karin-chan, is a cute kappa holding a bellflower. She is usually depicted walking in front of a magariya.

=== National Historic Sites ===
- Ayaorishinden Site, Jomon period archaeological site

== International relations ==
- Salerno, Italy, since August 8, 1984
- Chattanooga, Tennessee, United States, since September 15, 2017

Tōno is also twinned with three Japanese cities:

- (Japan) Mitaka, Tokyo, since 1989
- (Japan) Musashino, Tokyo, since 1988
- (Japan) Kikuchi, Kumamoto, since 1998

From 1990 to 2010, the high schools of Tōno and the Chattanooga School for the Arts & Sciences (CSAS) in Chattanooga, Tennessee were paired by School Partners Abroad to establish an exchange program. Near the end of every Japanese school year (in March), a delegation of Tōno high-school students visited Chattanooga, and reciprocally, a delegation from CSAS visited Tōno every summer. The city of Tōno embraced this exchange and organized a delegation of junior high school students to visit CSAS and the Chattanooga School for the Liberal Arts (CSLA) a few weeks before the high school students. After many delegations between the two cities, Chattanooga and Tono became sister cities on September 15, 2017.

== Notable people from Tōno ==
- Inō Kanori, anthropologist
- Kuniko Koda, politician
- Isaac Namioka, mathematician
- Kizen Sasaki, folklorist
