= Kamaishi Line =

Railway line in Iwate prefecture, Japan

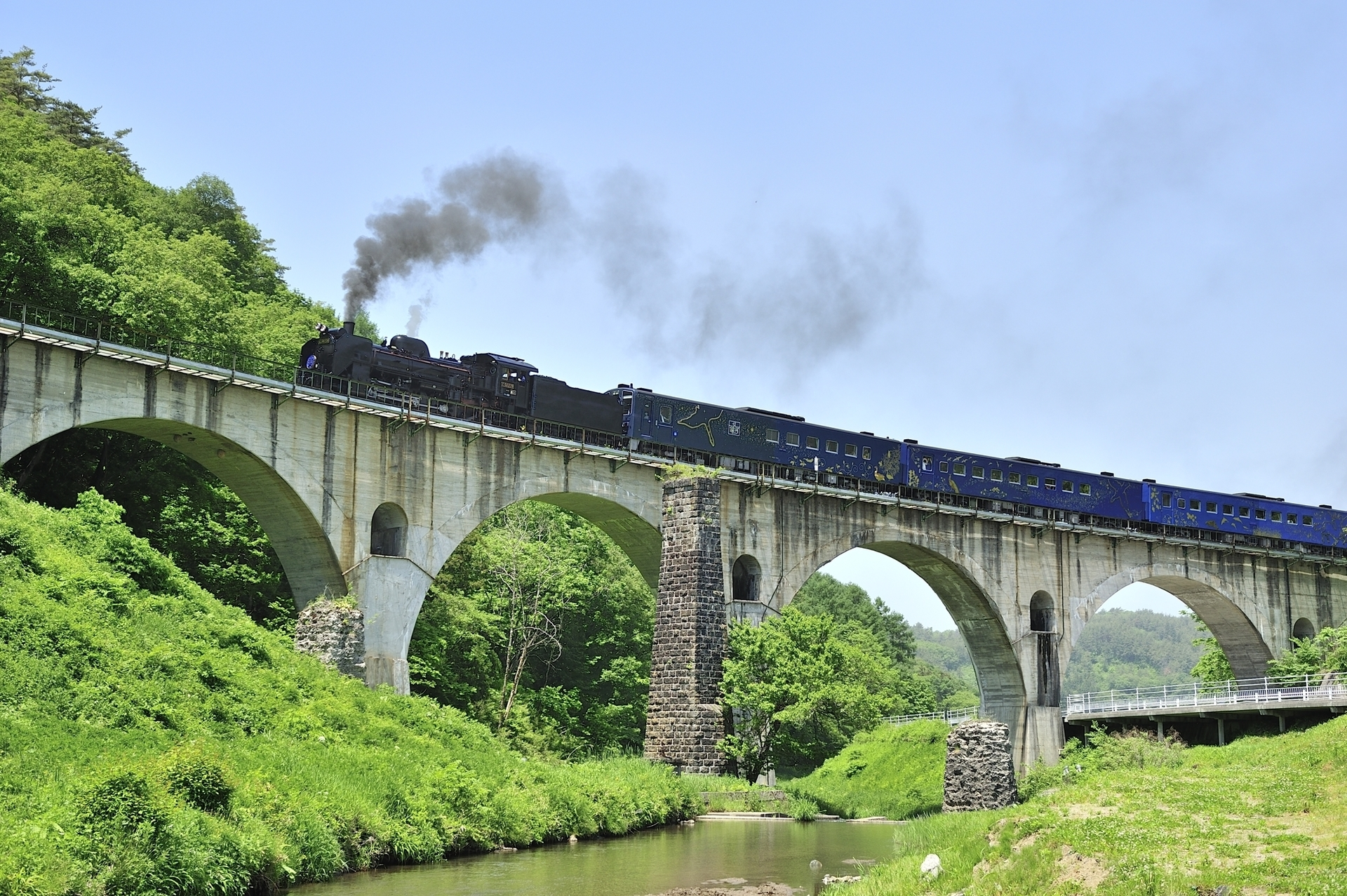
- SL Ginga running on Miyamorigawa Bridge

Overview
- Native name: 釜石線
- Status: In operation
- Owner: JR East
- Locale: Iwate Prefecture, Japan
- Termini: Hanamaki; Kamaishi
- Stations: 24

Service
- Type: Regional rail
- Operator(s): JR East
- Rolling stock: KiHa 100 series DMU

History
- Opened: 25 October 1913

Technical
- Line length: 90.2 km (56.0 mi)
- Number of tracks: Entire line single tracked
- Character: Rural
- Track gauge: 1,067 mm (3 ft 6 in)
- Electrification: None
- Operating speed: 85 km/h (53 mph)
Route map
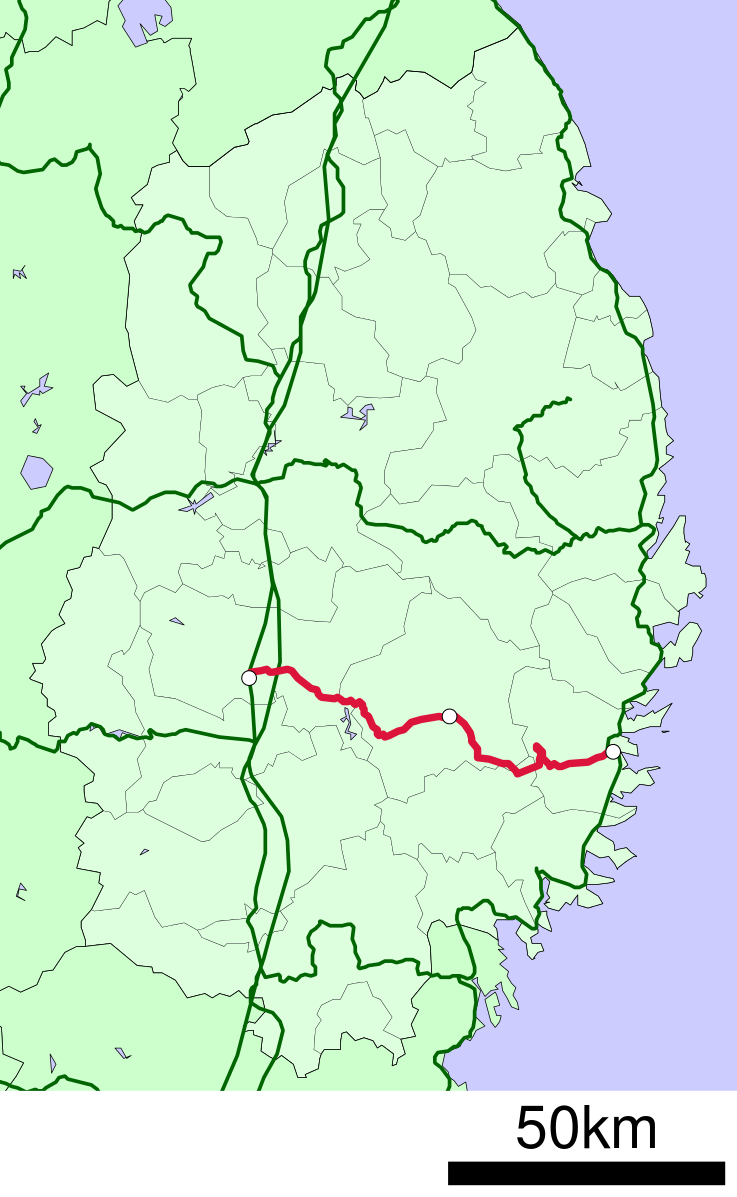

The Kamaishi Line (釜石線, Kamaishi-sen) is a 90.2 km (56.0 mi) rural railway line in Iwate Prefecture, Japan, operated by the East Japan Railway Company (JR East). It connects Hanamaki Station in the city of Hanamaki with Kamaishi Station in the city of Kamaishi.

Kenji Miyazawa, known for literary works such as Night on the Galactic Railroad, was born in Hanamaki City along this line. Consequently, the line bears a commemorative nickname and operates tourist trains. The landscapes along the line depicted in "Night on the Galactic Railroad" are said to be modeled after the Iwate Light Railway, the predecessor of this line, and the route's nickname, "Galaxy Dream Line Kamaishi Line," reflects this connection. Similarly, Kenji Miyazawa's Signal and Signaler personifies the signals of the Tohoku Main Line and Kamaishi Line as a romantic tale between a man and a woman. Furthermore, because Miyazawa frequently used Esperanto words in his works, each station has been given an affectionate nickname in Esperanto.

== History ==
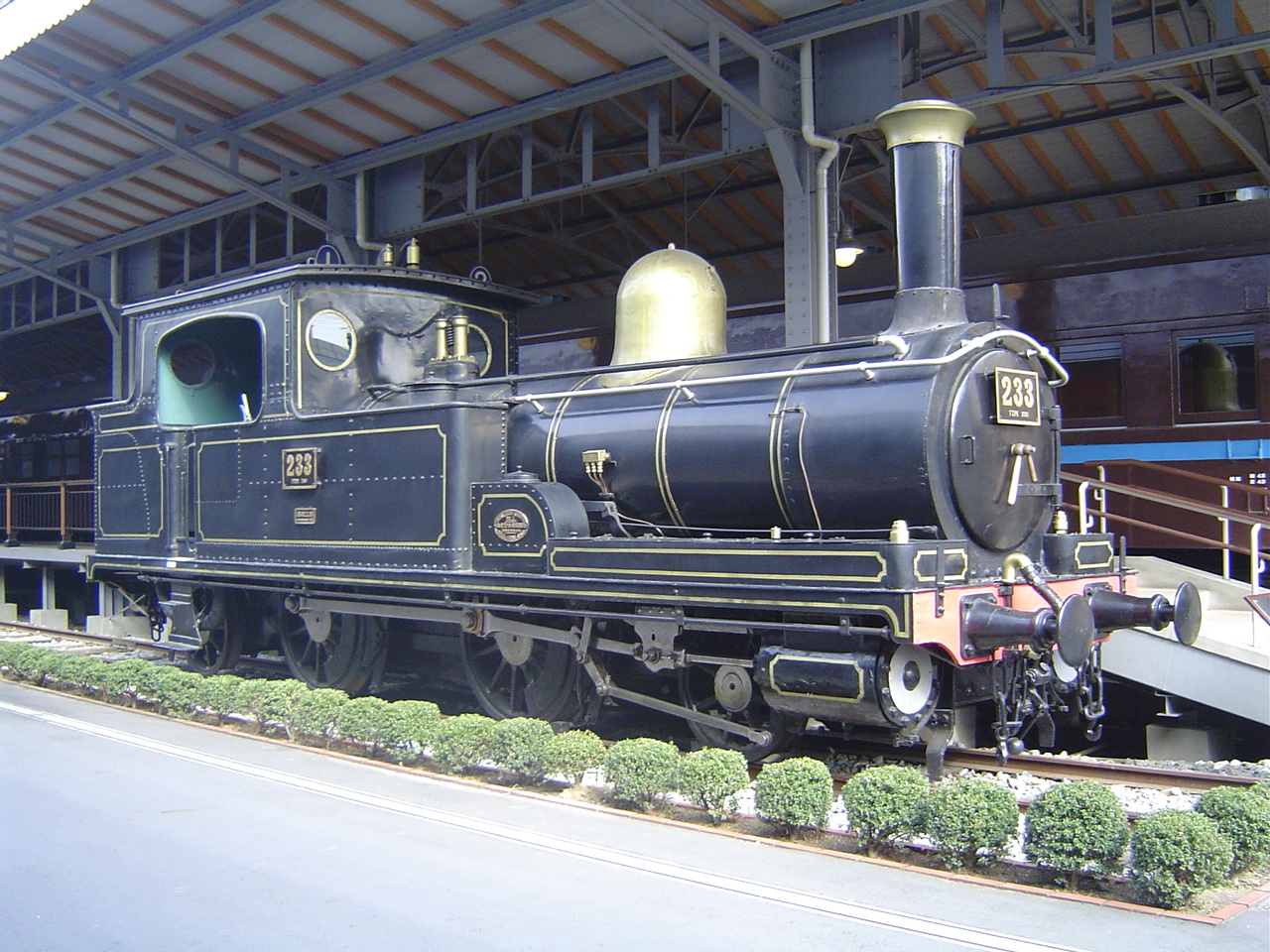
Preserved Class 231 locomotive number 233

The precursor to the line opened in 1915 as the Iwate Light Railway (岩手軽便鉄道), a 762 mm (2 ft 6 in) light railway extending 65.4 km from Hanamaki to Sennintōge Station (仙人峠). The original plan was to link with Kamaishi Mine and Kamaishi Port, but at an altitude of 887m, the mountain pass at Sennintōge prevented immediate expansion eastward to Kamaishi. A ropeway conveyor was used to convey goods onward to Ōhashi, from where a 16 km 762mm (2'6") gauge mining railway (which operated between 1915 and 1965) provided the service to Kamaishi.

The railway was nationalized in August 1936, and the line became the "Kamaishi Line". Motive power for the line was provided by six JNR Class 231 steam locomotives, built by Baldwin Locomotive Works in the USA, and numbered 231 to 236. Work started on upgrading and re-gauging the line, and the first section, the 31.2 km from Hanamaki to Kashiwagidaira was regauged to the standard Japanese track gauge of 1,067 mm (3 ft 6 in) and re-opened from September 1943. The mining railway between Rikuchū-Ōhashi and Kamaishi was also upgraded to 1,067 mm gauge by October 1944 to meet the urgent need for increased capacity to transport iron ore during the war period, and was named the Kamaishi East Line (釜石東線, Kamaishi-Higashi-sen). The entire 90.2 km line was finally completed between Hanamaki and Kamaishi in June 1950, opening to traffic on 10 October of that year.

== Stations ==
All stations are in Iwate Prefecture.

Name		Esperanto Nickname	Distance (km)	Rapid Hamayuri	Connections	Location
Hanamaki	花巻	Ĉielarko	0.0	●	■ Tōhoku Main Line	Hanamaki
Nitanai	似内	La Marbordo	3.5	｜		Hanamaki
Shin-Hanamaki	新花巻	Stelaro	6.4	●	Tōhoku Shinkansen	Hanamaki
Oyamada	小山田	Luna Nokto	8.3	｜		Hanamaki
Tsuchizawa	土沢	Brila Rivero	12.7	●		Tono
Haruyama	晴山	Ĉeriz-arboj	15.9	｜		Tono
Iwanebashi	岩根橋	Fervojponto	21.7	｜		Tono
Miyamori	宮守	Galaksia Kajo	25.1	●		Tono
Kashiwagidaira	柏木平	Glanoj	31.2	｜		Tono
Masuzawa	鱒沢	Lakta Vojo	33.6	▲		Tono
Arayamae	荒谷前	Akvorado	36.4	｜		Tono
Iwate-Futsukamachi	岩手二日町	Farmista Domo	39.3	｜		Tono
Ayaori	綾織	Teksilo	41.1	｜		Tono
Tōno	遠野	Folkloro	46.0	●		Tono
Aozasa	青笹	Kapao	50.3	｜		Tono
Iwate-Kamigō	岩手上郷	Cervodanco	53.8	▲		Tono
Hirakura	平倉	Monta Dio	56.6	｜		Tono
Ashigase	足ヶ瀬	Montopasejo	61.2	｜		Tono
Kami-Arisu	上有住	Kaverno	65.4	｜		Sumita, Kesen District
Rikuchū-Ōhashi	陸中大橋	Minaĵo	73.7	｜		Kamaishi
Dōsen	洞泉	Cervoj	79.6	｜		Kamaishi
Matsukura	松倉	La Suda Kruco	83.2	▲		Kamaishi
Kosano	小佐野	Verda Vento	86.5	●		Kamaishi
Kamaishi	釜石	La Oceano	90.2	●	■ Sanriku Railway Rias Line	Kamaishi

=== Closed stations ===
- Yasawa Station (矢沢駅), between Nitanai and Oyamada, 2.5 km east of Nitanai, opened 25 October 1913, closed 14 March 1985 when the nearby Shin-Hanamaki Station opened.

== Rolling stock ==
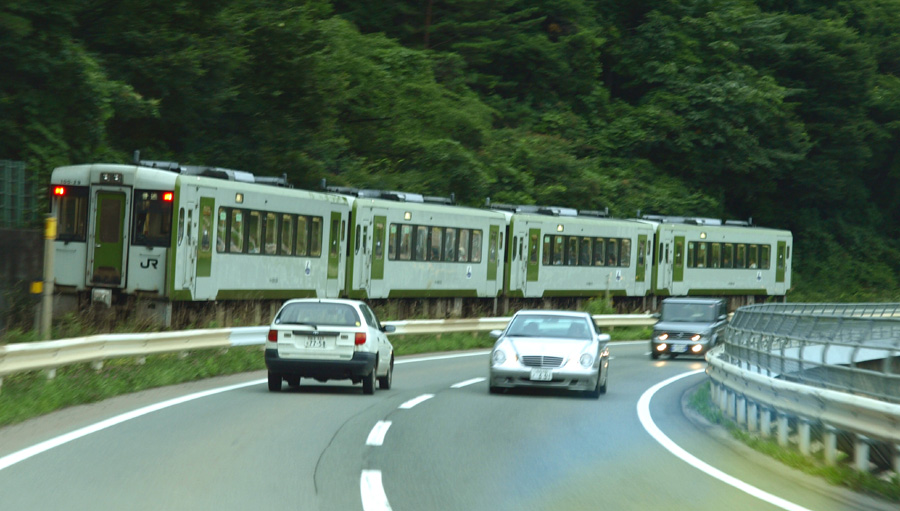
KiHa 100 series DMU train running alongside Route 283, August 2008

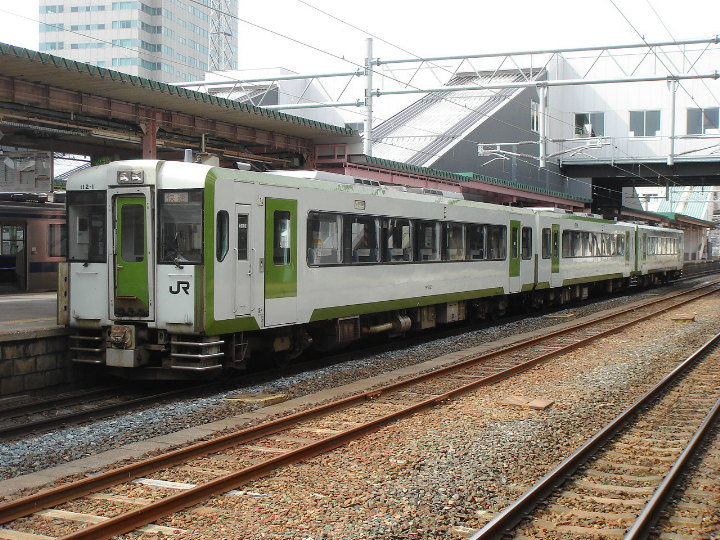
KiHa 110 series DMU train at Morioka on a Hamayuri rapid service, March 2007

Kamaishi Line services are operated using KiHa 110 series diesel trains.

From 12 April 2014, a newly formed SL Ginga "Joyful Train" (excursion train) began operating on the line at weekends using the restored JNR Class C58 steam locomotive C58 239 together with a train of four modified former KiHa 141 series diesel cars purchased from JR Hokkaido (themselves rebuilt from earlier 50 series passenger coaches and made surplus to requirements following the electrification of the Sasshō Line). The diesel cars provide additional power to cope with the line's gradients. The coach design work was overseen by industrial designer Ken Okuyama.

=== Former rolling stock ===
Following the full opening of the line in 1950, passenger and freight services on the line were hauled by JNR Class D50 2-8-2 steam locomotives, necessary to negotiate the steep gradients on the line of up 25 ‰. A couple of JNR Class 8620 steam locomotives were also used for shunting at Kamaishi Station. JNR Class C58 2-6-2 steam locomotives were also used on both passenger and freight services running to and from the Yamada Line. Six JNR Class D51 2-8-2 steam locomotives were subsequently transferred to the line, displacing some of the earlier D50s, but steam haulage on the line was entirely replaced by diesel haulage from March 1967.

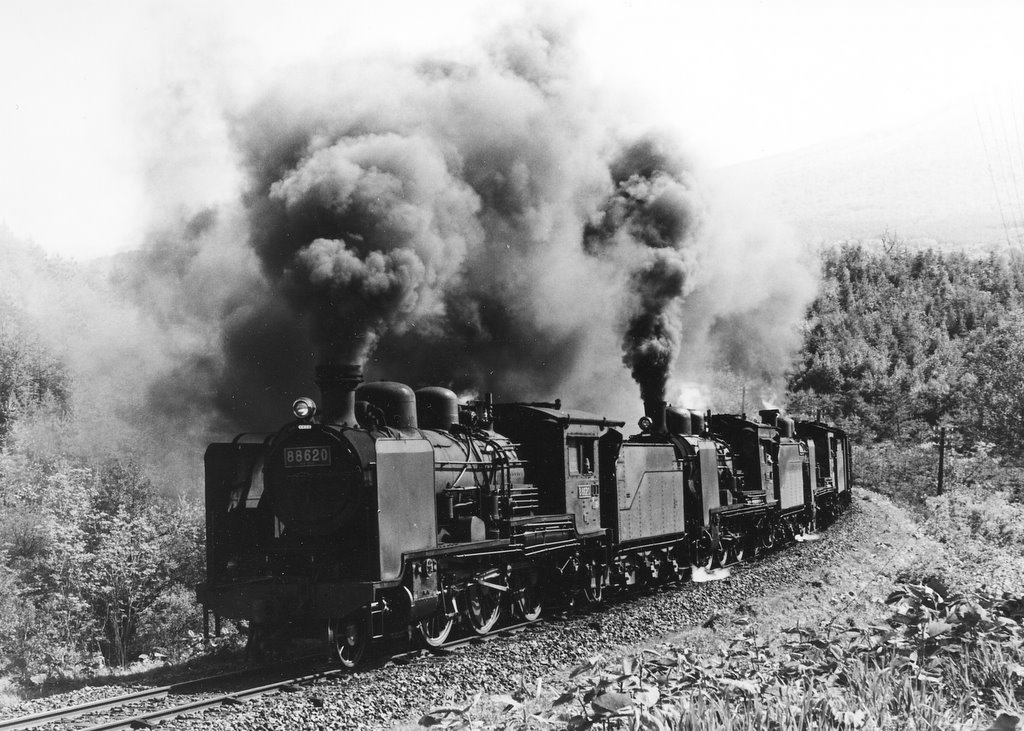
Class 8620 steam locomotives

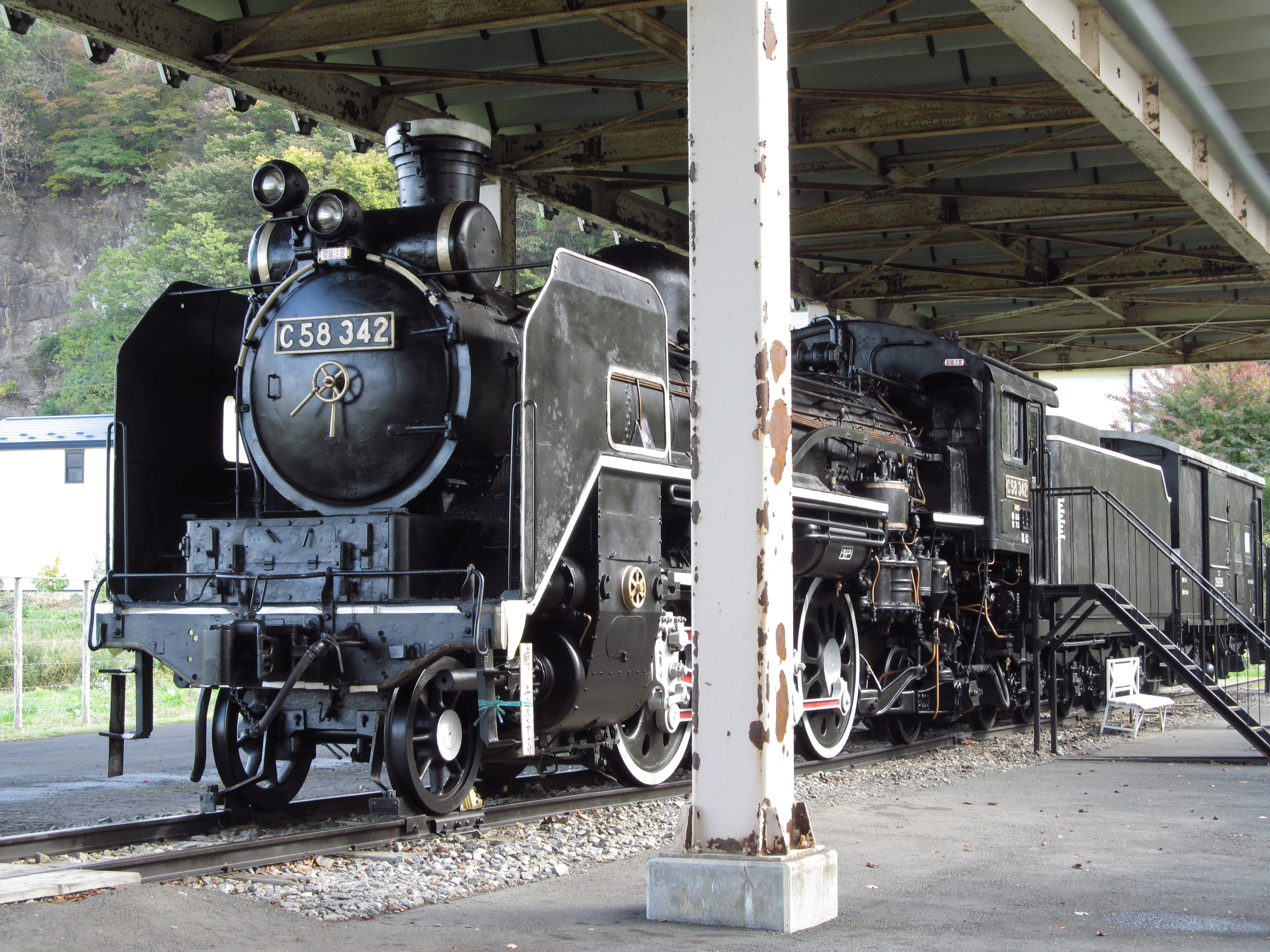
A preserved Class C58 steam locomotive

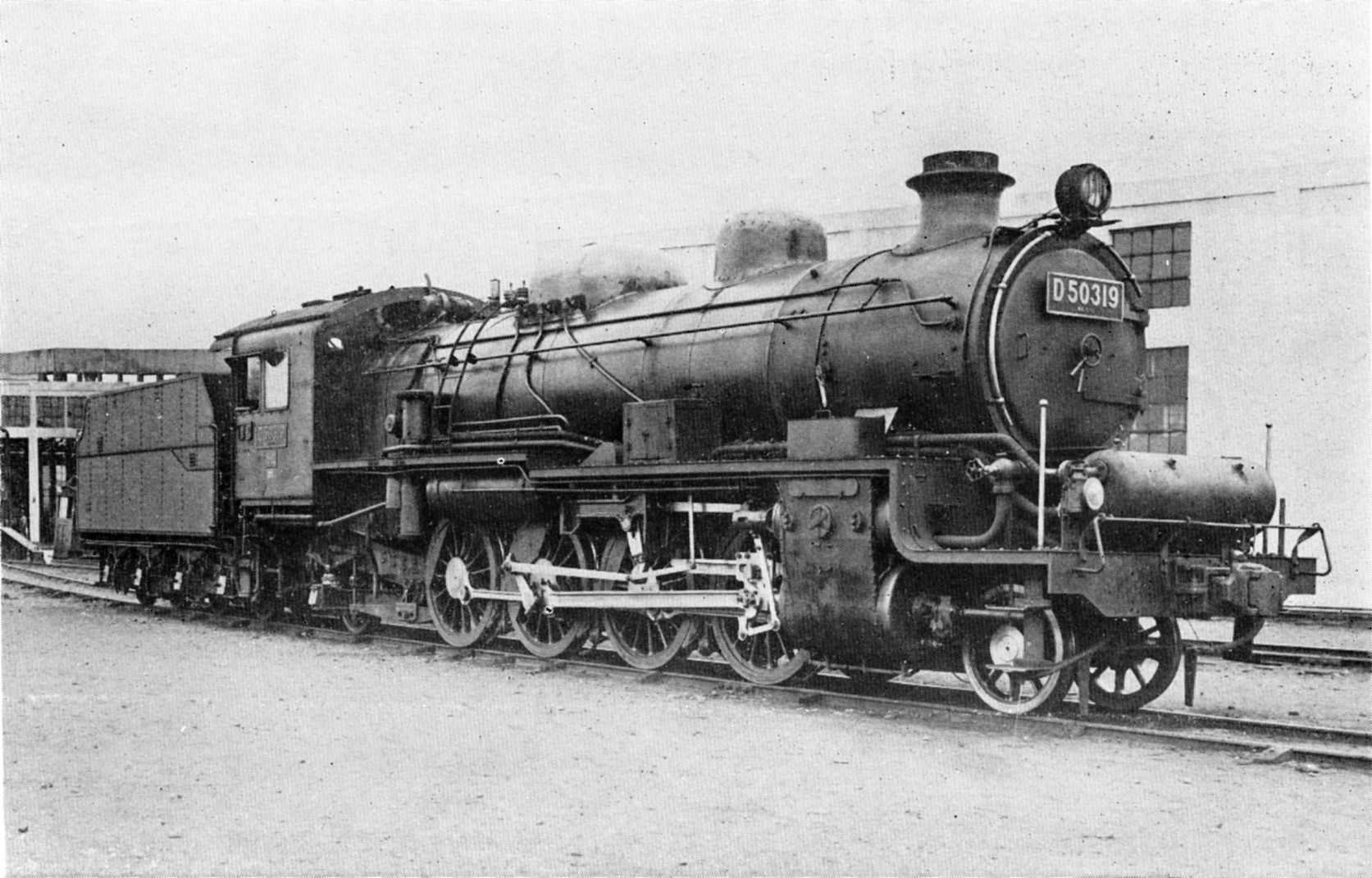
A Class D50 steam locomotive

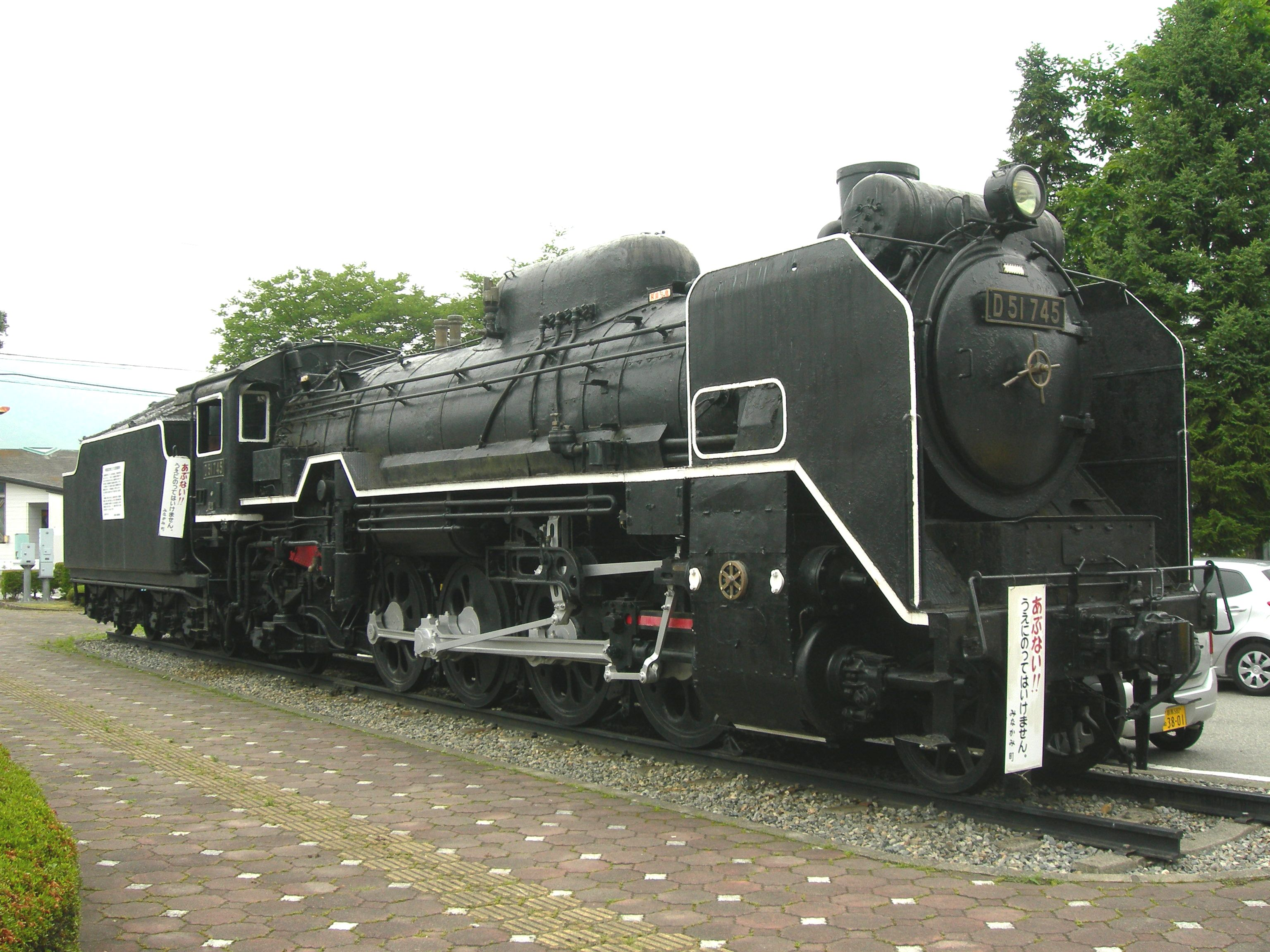
A preserved Class D51 steam locomotive
