= Tōno Station =

Railway station in Tōno, Iwate Prefecture, Japan

Tōno Station 遠野駅
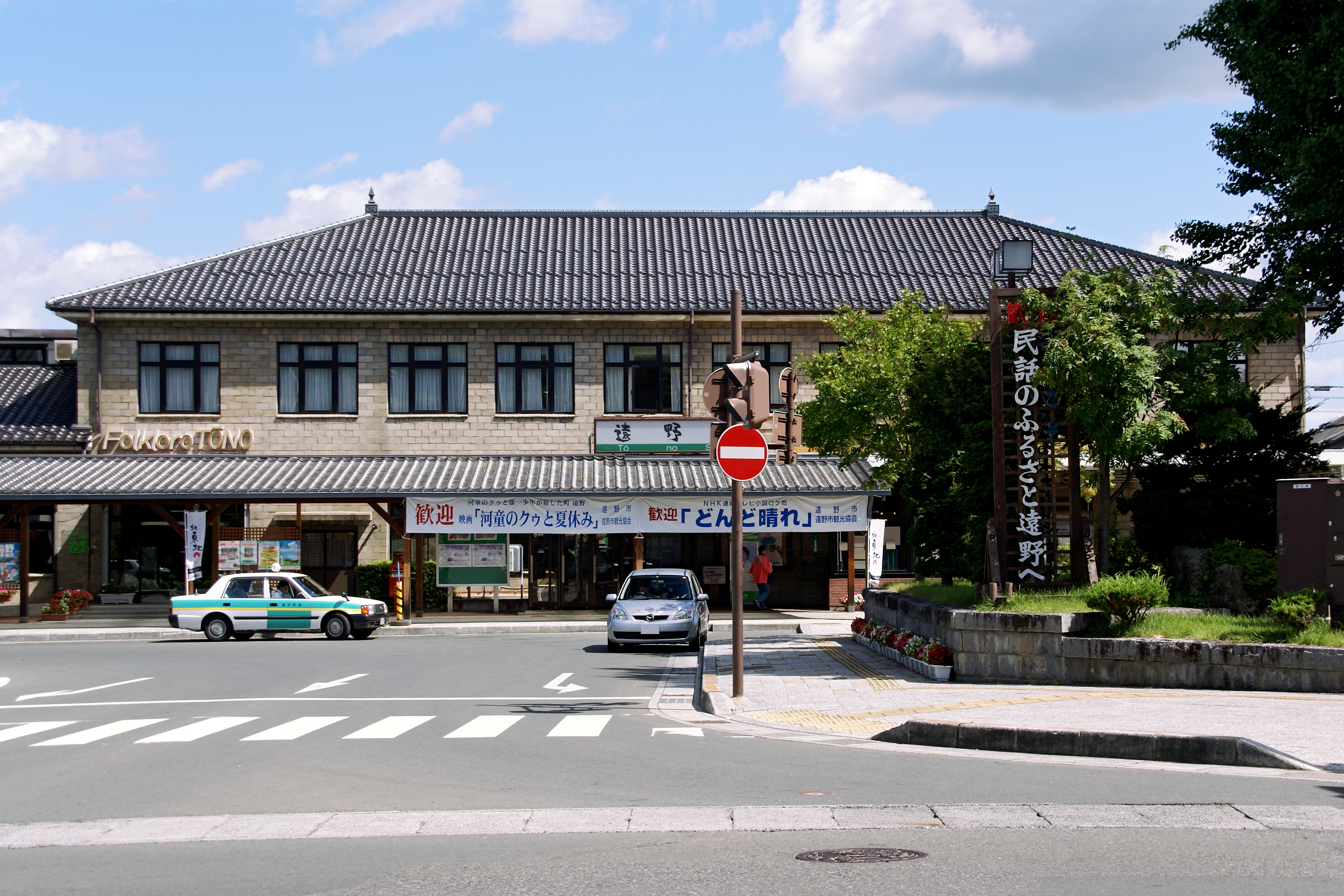
- Tōno Station in August 2007

General information
- Location: 5-7 Shinkoku-chō, Tōno-shi, Iwate-ken 028-0522; Japan
- Coordinates: 39.3324°N 141.5305°E
- Operator: JR East
- Line: ■ Kamaishi Line
- Distance: 46.0 km from Hanamaki
- Platforms: 1 island + side platform
- Tracks: 3
- Connections: Bus

Construction
- Structure type: At grade

Other information
- Status: Staffed (Midori no Madoguchi)
- Website: Official website

History
- Opened: 18 April 1914

Passengers
- FY2018: 330 (daily)

Services
Preceding station	JR East	Following station
Masuzawa (limited service) towards Hanamaki	Kamaishi Line Rapid Hamayuri	Iwate-Kamigō (limited service) towards Kamaishi
Ayaori towards Hanamaki	Kamaishi Line Local	Aozasa towards Kamaishi
Location
- Location within Iwate Prefecture Location within Japan

Tōno Station (遠野駅, Tōno-eki) is a railway station in the city of Tōno, Iwate, Japan, operated by East Japan Railway Company (JR East).

== Lines ==
Tōno Station is served by the Kamaishi Line, and is located 46.0 kilometers from the terminus of the line at Hanamaki Station.

== Station layout ==
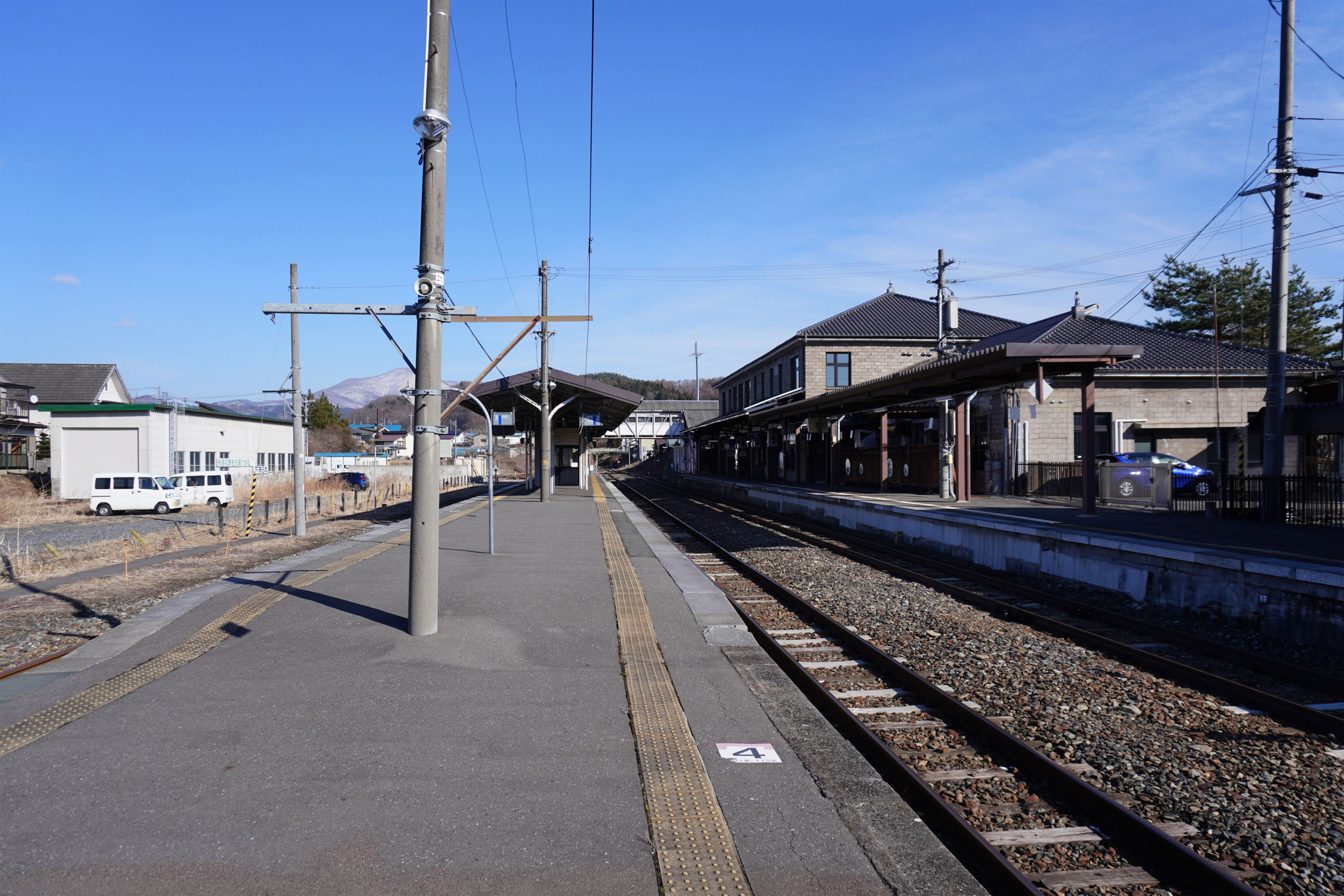
Platforms (March 2024)

The station has a single side platform and an island platform, connected to the station building by a footbridge. The station has a Midori no Madoguchi staffed ticket office.

=== Platforms ===
1	■ Kamaishi Line	for Tsuchizawa , Hanamaki and Morioka
2	■ Kamaishi Line	for Kamaishi and Miyako
3	■ Kamaishi Line	for starting trains

== History ==
Tōno Station opened on 18 April 1914 as a station on the Iwate Light Railway (岩手軽便鉄道), a 762 mm (2 ft 6 in) light railway extending 65.4 km from Hanamaki to the now-defunct Sennintōge Station (仙人峠駅).

The line was nationalized in August 1936, becoming the Kamaishi Line. The station was absorbed into the JR East network upon the privatization of the Japanese National Railways (JNR) on 1 April 1987.

== Passenger statistics ==
In fiscal 2018, the station was used by an average of 330 passengers daily (boarding passengers only).

== Surrounding area ==
- Tōno Post Office
- Tōno City Hall
- Tōno Zoo
- Nabukura Park
- Tōno Folklore Village

== See also ==
- List of railway stations in Japan
