= Japan National Route 283 =

Road in Iwate prefecture, Japan

National Route 283
- 国道283号
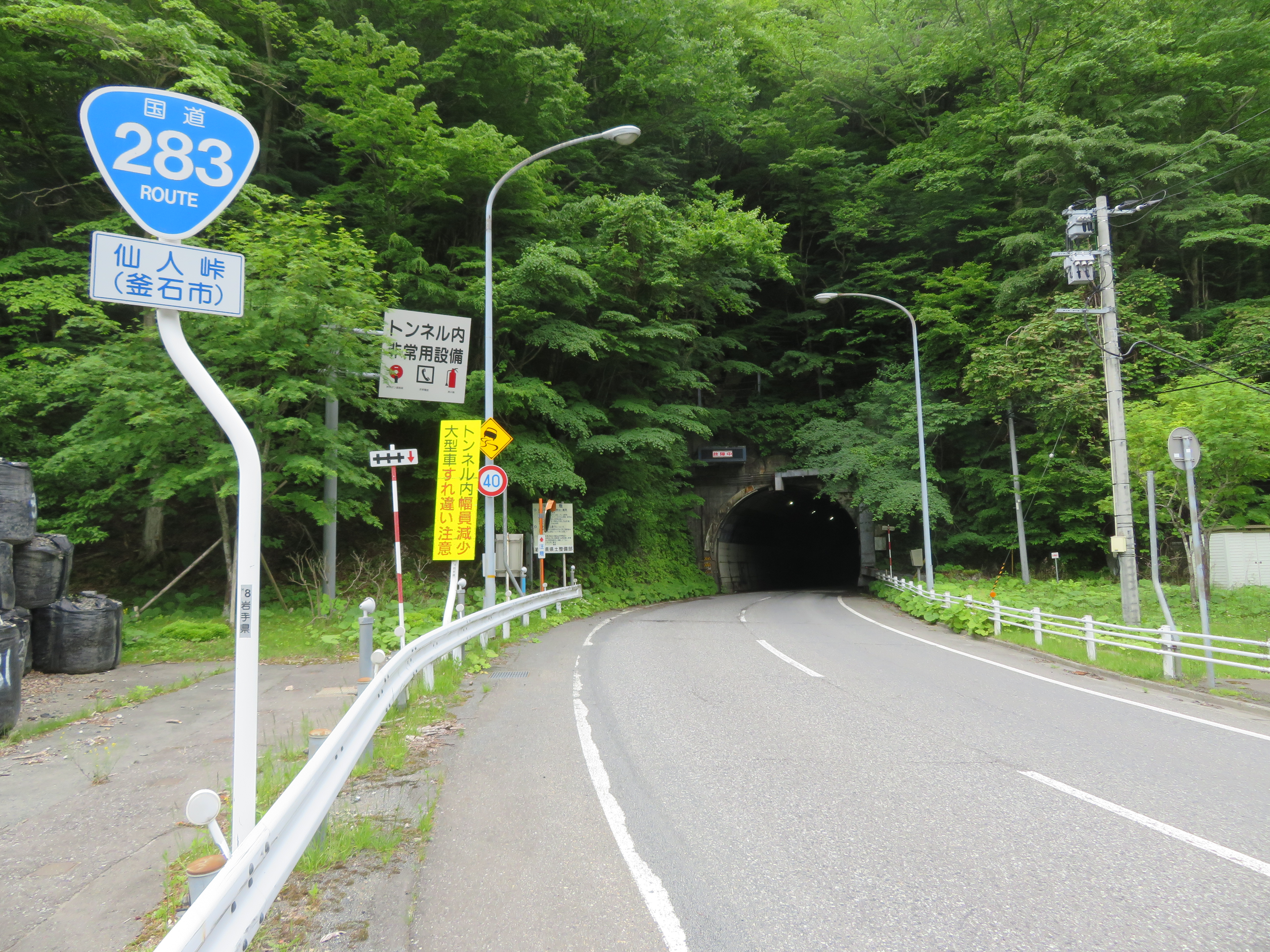
- Sennin Tunnel in Kamaishi

Route information
- Length: 89.3 km (55.5 mi)

Location
- Country: Japan

Highway system
- National highways of Japan; Expressways of Japan
← National Route 282	→ National Route 284

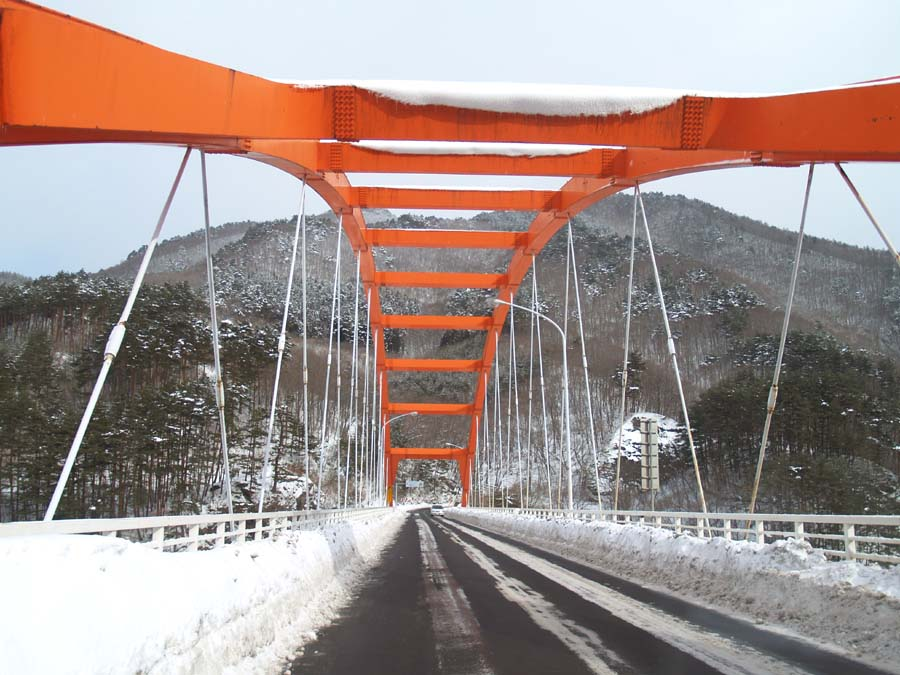
Route 283 crosses Lake Tase via the Tase Ohashi Bridge in Hanamaki City

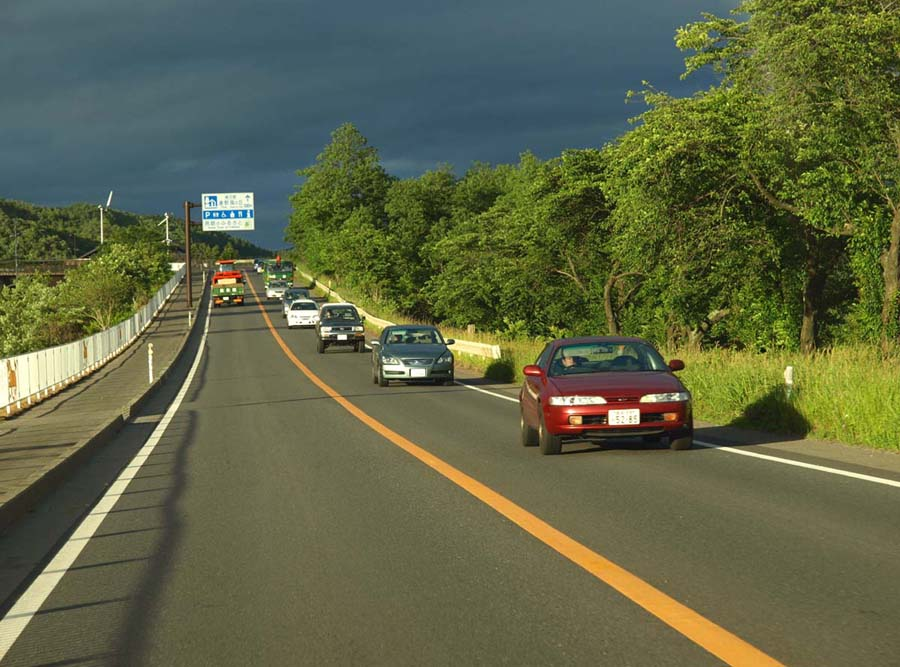
Route 283 crosses over the Kamaishi Line just before reaching the Kaze no Oka road station in Tono

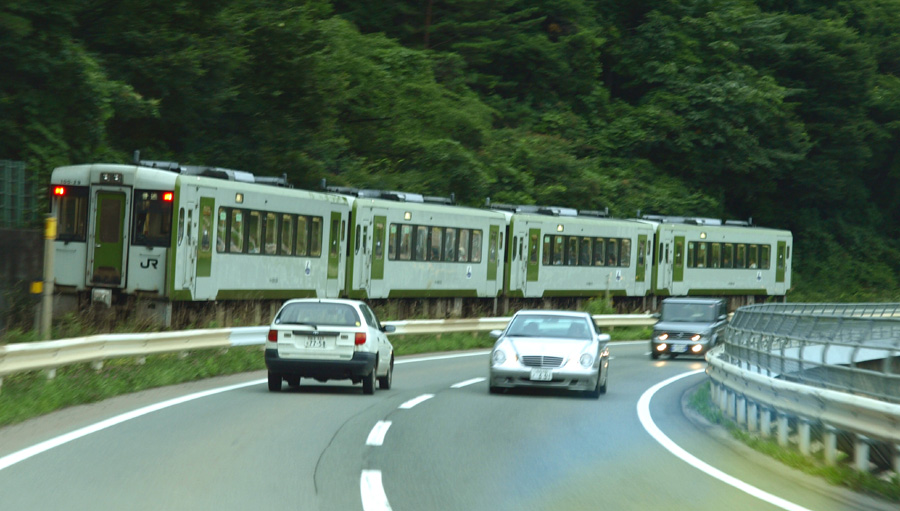
Route 283 parallels the Kamaishi Line on the left and the Sarugaishi River on the right in Miyamori, Tono City

National Route 283 (国道283号, Kokudō 283-gō) is a national highway connecting Kamaishi, Iwate and Hanamaki, Iwate in Japan, with a total length of 89.3 km (55.49 mi).

== Route description ==
National Route 283 almost exactly parallels the JR Kamaishi Line its entire length. Through Hanamaki and Tono, National Route 283 follows the Sarugaishi River, then from downtown Tono to Sennin Toge Pass it parallels the Hayase River. In Kamaishi, it follows the Kasshi River.

National Route 283 travels mostly through rural countryside connecting Hanamaki, Hanamaki Airport, Towa, Lake Tase, Miyamori, Tono and Kamaishi. The flat plains of eastern Hanamaki rise to the gently rolling hills of the Kitakami Range which then give way to the plains of Tono. There are two Road Stations in Tono along National Route 283, one in Miyamori and Kaze no Oka in Ayaori.

The only tunnel on the route is at Sennin Toge Pass. It is about two-and-a-half kilometers in length. Despite the pass, the road in Kamaishi is quite contorted at the higher elevations. Near the western entrance to the tunnel there are shallow limestone caves that produce ice formations resembling stalactites and stalagmites in winter. In the hills above Rikuchū-Ōhashi Station in Kamaishi, there was a Japanese prisoner of war camp for a short time before the end of World War II.

== Intersections ==
In Hanamaki, National Route 456 ends at Route 283 in Towa next to JR Tsuchizawa Station. National Route 456 leads south through Esashi Ward of Oshu City then Daito and Senmaya in Ichinoseki City before crossing into Miyagi Prefecture. Prefectural Roads 178 and 161 meet just north of JR Miyamori Station. 178 leads south across the Tase Dam, circles Lake Tase and ends at National Route 107.

In Tono, Prefectural Roads 178 and 161 join 283 just northwest of Miyamori Station. To the south 178 crosses Lake Tase Dam and circles around Lake Tase before intersecting National Route 107. National Route 107 joins National Route 283 at the tail end of Lake Tase just to the west of Kashiwagidaira Station, follows National Route 283 for some three kilometers before going south to Sumida Town at Masuzawa Station. National Route 396 ends at National Route 283 in Tono just a kilometer and a half west of the Kaze no Oka Road Station. It leads to the north through Miyamori, Ohasama and on to Morioka. National Route 340 joins National Route 283 next to Tono Hospital and the two routes combine for nearly nine kilometers before National Route 340 branches off to the south at Iwate-Kamigō Station. Traveling northbound, National Route 340 leads to Kawaii Village, Kuzumaki Town, Kunohe Village, and on to Hachinohe in Aomori Prefecture. To the south, National Route 340 leads to Sumida Town and Rikuzen Takata City.
