= Kamaishi Station =

Railway station in Kamaishi, Iwate Prefecture, Japan

Kamaishi Station 釜石駅
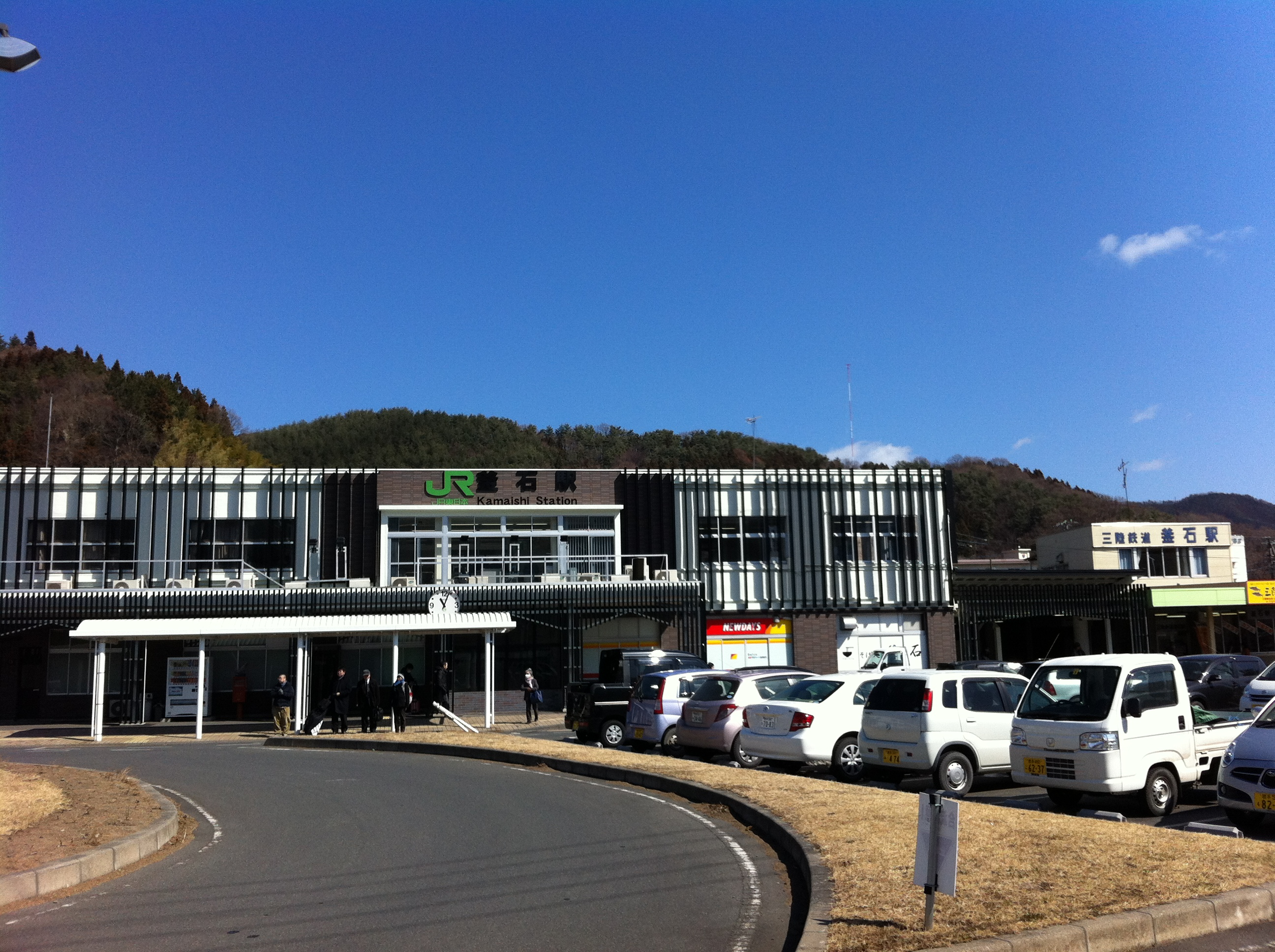
- Kamaishi Station in March 2013

General information
- Location: 22-5 Isuzu-cho, Kamaishi-shi, Iwate-ken 026-0031; Japan
- Coordinates: 39°16′24″N 141°52′22″E
- Operator: JR East; Sanriku Railway
- Lines: ■ Kamaishi Line; ■ Rias Line
- Distance: 90.2 km from Hanamaki (Kamaishi Line); 36.6 km from Sakari (Rias Line)
- Platforms: 1 side platform and 2 island platforms
- Tracks: 5
- Connections: Bus

Construction
- Structure type: At grade

Other information
- Status: Staffed (Midori no Madoguchi)
- Website: Official website

History
- Opened: 17 September 1939

Passengers
- FY2018: 233 (JR East), 113 (Sanriku) daily

Services
Preceding station	JR East	Following station
Kosano towards Hanamaki	Kamaishi Line Rapid Hamayuri	Terminus
Kosano towards Hanamaki	Kamaishi Line Local	Terminus
Preceding station	Sanriku Railway	Following station
Heita towards Sakari	Rias Line	Ryōishi towards Kuji
Location
- Location within Iwate Prefecture Location within Japan

Kamaishi Station (釜石駅, Kamaishi-eki) is a junction railway station in the city of Kamaishi, Iwate, Japan, operated by East Japan Railway Company (JR East) and the Third-sector Sanriku Railway.

== Lines ==
Kamaishi Station is a terminal station of the JR East Kamaishi Line and is located 90.2 kilometers from the opposing terminus at Hanamaki. It is an intermediate station for the Sanriku Railway's Rias Line. The station was formerly also a terminal station for the Sanriku Railway's Minami-Rias Line and the JR East Yamada Line; however, rail operations have remained suspended since the 2011 Tōhoku earthquake and tsunami on 11 March 2011. The Minami-Rias Line between Yoshihama and Kamaishi resumed on 5 April 2014. Yamada line reopened on 23 March 2019 with operations transferred to the Sanriku Railway. Then, it joined up with the Kita-Rias Line on one side and the Minami-Rias Line on the other, which together constitutes the entire Rias Line.

== Station layout ==
Kamaishi Station has a side platform and two island platform serving five tracks, connected to the station building by an underground passage. The station has a Midori no Madoguchi staffed ticket office.

=== Platforms ===
1-3	■ Kamaishi Line	for Tōno, and Hanamaki
3-4	■ Rias Line	Miyako and Kuji
3-4	■ Rias Line	for Sakari
5	■ Rias Line	for Sakari

== History ==
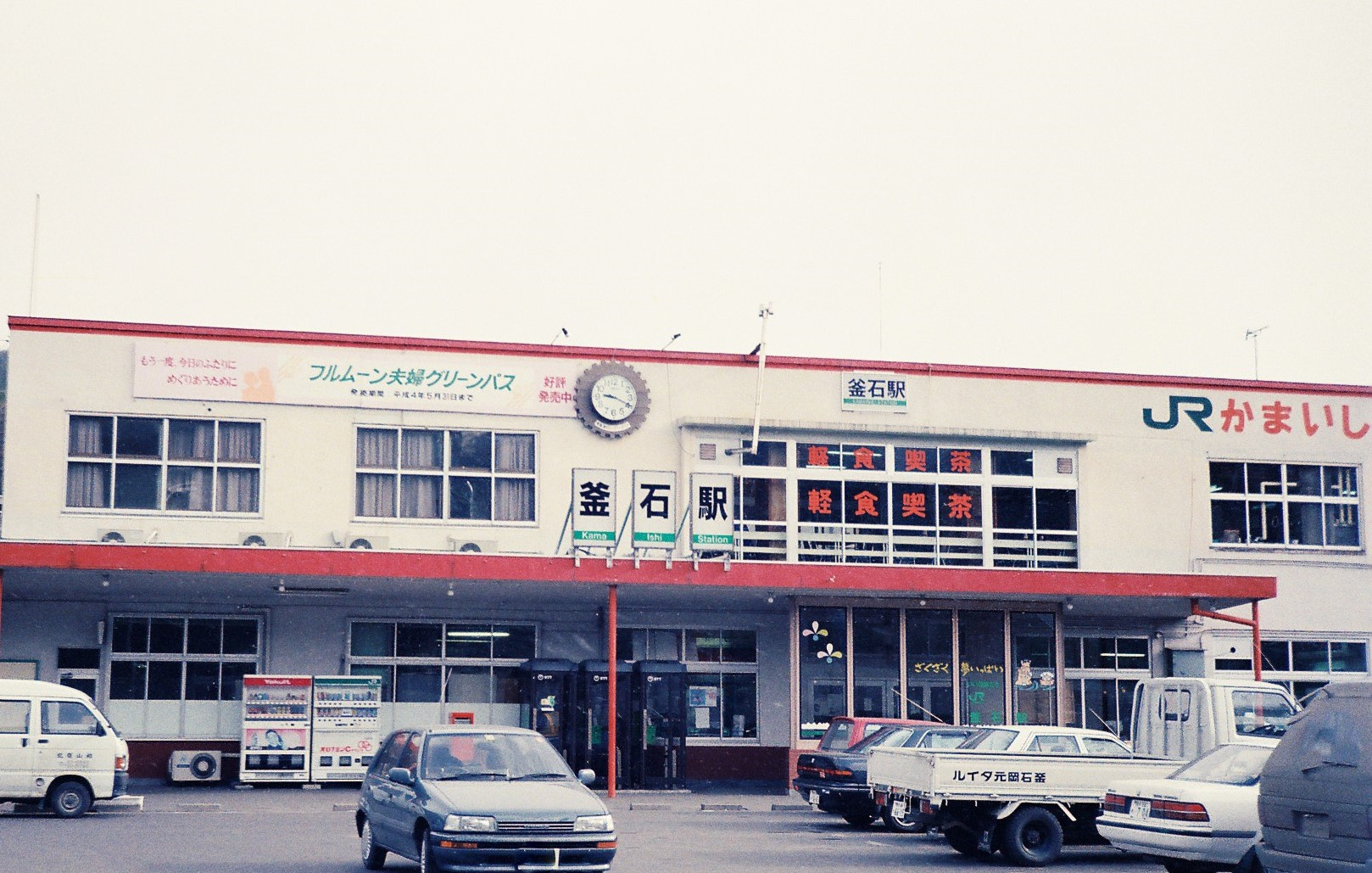
The JR East station in February 1992

Kamaishi Station opened on 17 September 1939. The Kamakishi Line began operations from 11 October 1944. The station also became a terminal station for the Miyako Line on 27 February 1972. This line was privatized on 1 April 1987, becoming the Sanriku Railway South Rias Line. Kamaishi Station was absorbed into the JR East network upon the privatization of the Japanese National Railways (JNR) on 1 April 1987. The 2011 Tōhoku earthquake and tsunami on 11 March 2011 destroyed much of the tracks and many stations of the Yamada Line between Miyako and Kamaishi. In February 2012, JR East officially proposed that this section of the Yamada Line be scrapped and the right-of-way used as a bus rapid transit (BRT) route but this decision was subsequently overturned and the line restored pending transfer to the Sanriku Railway. On 23 March 2019, the Yamada Line section from Miyako to Kamaishi was reopened and transferred to Sanriku Railway. This joined up with the Kita-Rias Line on one side and the Minami-Rias Line on the other which together constitutes the entire Rias Line. Accordingly, this station became an intermediate station of the Rias Line.

== Passenger statistics ==
In fiscal 2018, the JR East portion of the station was used by an average of 233 passenger daily (boarding passengers only). The Sanriku Railway portion of the station was used by 113 passengers during the same period.

== Surrounding area ==
- Kamaishi City Office
- Kamaishi Post Office

== See also ==
- List of railway stations in Japan
