= Hanamaki Station =

Railway station in Hanamaki, Iwate Prefecture, Japan

Hanamaki Station 花巻駅
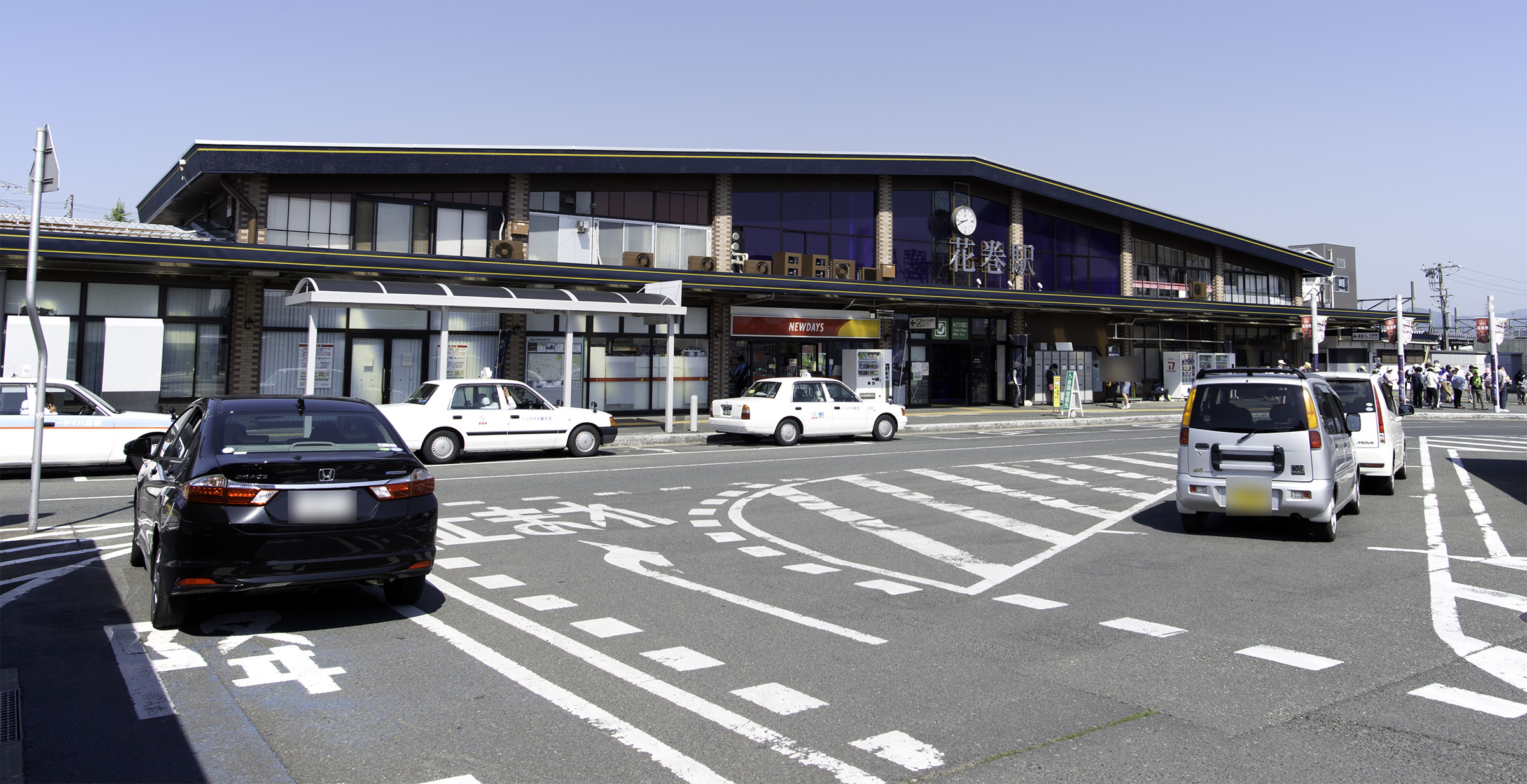
- Hanamaki Station in May 2015

General information
- Location: 1-43-2 Odori, Hanamaki-shi, Iwate-ken 025-0092; Japan
- Coordinates: 39°23′37″N 141°06′37″E
- Operator: JR East
- Lines: ■ Tohoku Main Line; ■ Kamaishi Line
- Distance: 500.0 km from Tokyo
- Platforms: 1 island + 1 side platform
- Tracks: 3

Construction
- Structure type: At grade

Other information
- Status: Staffed (Midori no Madoguchi )
- Website: Official website

History
- Opened: 1 November 1890

Passengers
- FY2018: 3,287 (daily)

Services
Preceding station	JR East	Following station
Kitakami One-way operation	Tōhoku Main Line Rapid Aterui	Yahaba towards Morioka
through to Kamaishi Line	Tōhoku Main Line Rapid Hamayuri	Yahaba towards Morioka
Murasakino towards Kuroiso	Tōhoku Main Line Local	Hanamaki-Kūkō towards Morioka
through to Tōhoku Main Line	Kamaishi Line Rapid Hamayuri	Shin-Hanamaki towards Kamaishi
Terminus	Kamaishi Line Local	Nitanai towards Kamaishi
Location
- Location within Iwate Prefecture Location within Japan

Hanamaki Station (花巻駅, Hanamaki-eki) is a junction railway station in the city of Hanamaki, Iwate, Japan, operated by the East Japan Railway Company (JR East).

== Lines ==
Hanamaki Station is served by the Tōhoku Main Line and the Kamaishi Line. It is located 500.0 kilometers from the starting point of the Tōhoku Main Line at Tokyo Station, and is a terminus for the Kamaishi Line. Hanamaki Station is not a stop of the Tōhoku Shinkansen. The nearest Shinkansen stations are Shin-Hanamaki Station (6.4 km via the Kamaishi Line) and Kitakami Station (12.5 km via the Tohoku Main Line).

== Station layout ==
Hanamaki Station has an island platform and a single side platform serving three tracks, connected to the station building by a footbridge. The station has a "Midori no Madoguchi" staffed ticket office.

=== Platforms ===
1	■ Tōhoku Main Line	for Hizume and Morioka
1	■ Kamaishi Line	for Shin-Hanamaki and Kamaishi
2	■ Tōhoku Main Line	for Kitakami, Mizusawa, and Ichinoseki
3	■ Tōhoku Main Line	for Hizume and Morioka

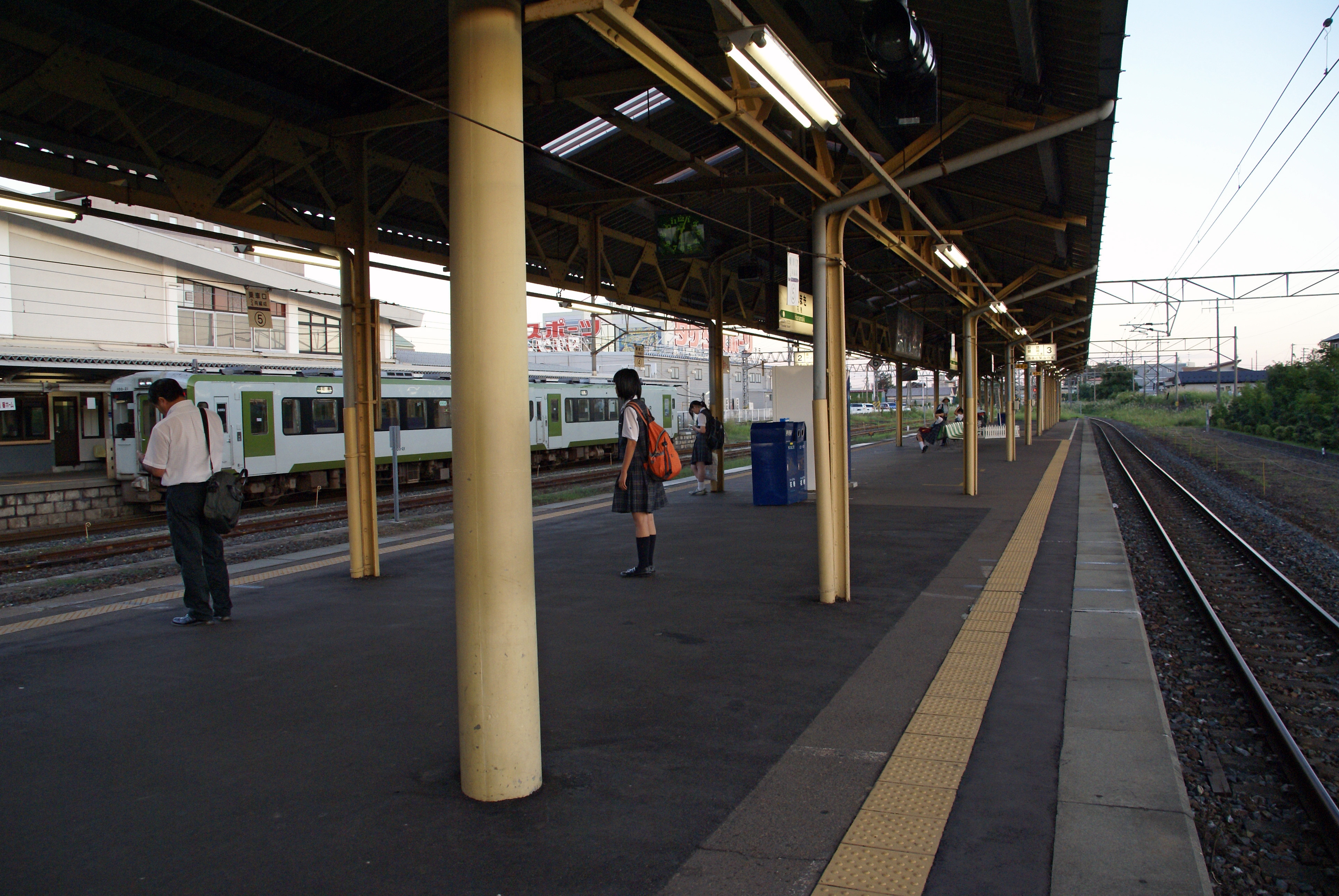
The platforms in August 2007

== History ==
Hanamaki Station opened on 1 November 1890. The Iwate Light Railway (岩手軽便鉄道) (the forerunner of the Kamaishi Line) established its terminus at Hanamaki on 25 October 1913. The two stations were amalgamated on 20 September 1943. The station was absorbed into the JR East network upon the privatization of the Japanese National Railways (JNR) on 1 April 1987.

The station building was renovated in 2014 with a style evoking the early 20th-century Taishō period portrayed in works by author Kenji Miyazawa, with work completed on 21 September 2014.

== Passenger statistics ==
In fiscal 2018, the station was used by an average of 3,287 passengers daily (boarding passengers only). The passenger figures for previous years are as shown below.

Fiscal year	Daily average
2000	3,817
2005	3,513
2010	3,281
2013	3,449
2015	3,379

== Surrounding area ==
- Kitakami River
- Site of former Hanamaki Castle
- Hanamaki City Hall
- Hanamaki Post Office
- Fuji University
- National Route 4

== See also ==
- List of railway stations in Japan
