= List of ōzeki =

53 sumo wrestlers have reached the second highest in the sport, the rank of ōzeki, but have failed to rise to the top rank since the modern era of sumo began in 1927 with the merger of the Tokyo and Osaka organizations. By 2020, over 250 wrestlers have been promoted to the rank of ōzeki throughout the entire history of the sport. Wrestlers who went on to be promoted to yokozuna are tabulated in the list of yokozuna. Active wrestlers are indicated by italics.

The number of top division yūshō (championships) won by each ōzeki is also listed. There is no requirement to win a championship before promotion, but a wrestler must usually have won around 33 bouts over three consecutive tournaments. Since 1927, the longest-serving ōzeki of modern times have been Kaiō and Chiyotaikai who each held the rank for 65 tournaments. With five wins, Kaiō also holds the record for yūshō won in the modern era by a wrestler to never reach the rank of yokozuna.

The table is up to date as of the start of the November 2026 tournament.

== List ==
Any titles listed before the current yūshō system was established in 1909 are regarded as unofficial.

Name	(in Japanese)	yūshō	Born	Home Town	First held	Last held	Status
Raiden Tameemon	雷電爲右衞門	28	1767	Tōmi, Nagano	1795	1811	retired
Hiodoshi Katsugorō	緋縅 勝五郎	0	1773	Yamagata District, Hiroshima	1814	1814	demoted
Tamagaki Gakunosuke	玉垣 額之助	4	1784	Minamitakaki, Nagasaki	1814	1824	death
Sendagawa Kichizō	千田川 吉藏	0	1793	Muro District, Kii	1815	1815	demoted
Kashiwado Risuke	柏戸 利助	16	1783	Goshogawara, Aomori	1815	1825	retired
Iwamigata Jōemon	岩見潟 丈右エ門	0	1785	Nishinomiya, Hyōgo Prefecture	1821	1822	demoted
Yotsugamine Tōkichi	四賀峰 東吉	2	1795	Kitakami, Iwate	1824	1828	retired
Genjiyama Tsunagorō	源氏山 綱五郎	1	1786	Tendō, Yamagata	1825	1826	demoted
Hiodoshi Rikiya II	緋縅力弥 (2代)	2	1799	Kyoto Prefecture	1833	1834	demoted
Akitsukaze Otoemon	秋津風 音右エ門	0	1797	Sannohe District, Aomori	1834	1834	demoted
Kotōzan Bun'emon	湖東山 文右エ門	2	1798	Yōkaichi, Shiga	1836	1838	demoted*
Oitekaze Kitarō	追手風 喜太郎	1	1800	Tsukui District, Kanagawa	1836	1836	demoted
Hiraiwa Shichidayū II	平石 七太夫 (2代)	0	1801	Edo, Musashi Province	1839	1840	demoted*
Tsurugizan Taniemon	劔山 谷右衛門	6	1803	Toyama, Toyama	1842	1852	retired
Kagamiiwa Hamanosuke II	鏡岩 濱之助 (2代)	1	1809	Niikawa district, Etchū	1850	1856	retired
Koyanagi Tsunekichi	小柳 常吉	5	1817	Ichihara district, Kazusa	1852	1856	retired
Iōzan Moriemon	猪王山 森右衛門	2	1815	Monou District, Miyagi	1856	1868	demoted
Kaigatake Ryūemon	階ヶ嶽 龍右エ門	2	1817	Takaoka, Toyama	1856	1857	demoted
Sakaigawa Namiemon I	境川浪右衛門 (初代)	2	1814	Kuwana, Mie	1857	1861	demoted*
Zōgahana Heisuke	象ヶ鼻 平助	0	1836	Tateyama, Chiba	1871	1872	retired
Ayasegawa Sanzaemon	綾瀬川 山左衛門	1	1835	Chūō-ku, Osaka	1872	1876	retired
Raiden Shin'emon	雷電 震右エ門	6	1842	Hakui District, Ishikawa	1877	1877	demoted
Asahidake Tsurunosuke	朝日嶽 鶴之助	0	?	Tsuruoka, Yamagata Prefecture	1877	1878	retired
Wakashima Kyūzaburō	若嶌久三郎	2	1842	Aizuwakamatsu, Fukushima Prefecture	1881	1884	retired
Tsurugizan Taniemon II	劔山 谷右エ門 (2代)	1	1852	Kamojima, Tokushima	1886	1892	retired
Ōdate Uzaemon	大達羽左エ門	4	1853	Tagawa, Dewa Province	1886	1889	demoted
Ichinoya Tōtarō	一ノ矢藤太郎	2	1856	Minamitsugaru District, Aomori	1889	1890	demoted
Ōnaruto Nadaemon II	大鳴門灘右エ門 (2代)	0	1853	Tsuna District, Hyōgo	1890	1891	retired
Yahatayama Sadakichi	八幡山定吉	2	1856	Tosa District, Kōchi	1891	1894	retired
Ōtohira Hirokichi	大戸平廣吉	2	1866	Miyagino-ku, Sendai	1893	1897	demoted
Ōikari Montarō	大碇紋太郎	0	1869	Chita District, Owari Province	1895	1896	demoted
Hōō Umagorō	鳳凰 馬五郎	3	1866	Chiba District, Chiba	1897	1900	demoted
Asashio Tarō I	朝汐 太郎	2	1864	Uwa, Ehime	1898	1903	demoted
Araiwa Kamenosuke	荒岩 亀之助	6	1871	Saihaku, Tottori	1905	1909	retired
Kunimiyama Etsukichi	國見山 悦吉	2	1876	Tosa District, Kōchi	1905	1912	retired
Komagatake Kuniriki	駒ヶ嶽 國力	0	1880	Tōda District, Miyagi	1907	1914	death
Isenohama Keitarō	伊勢ノ濱 慶太郎	0	1883	Sumida, Tokyo	1914	1919	retired
Asashio Tarō II	朝汐 太郎 (2代)	0	1879	Saijō, Ehime	1915	1919	retired
Tsushimanada Yakichi	對馬洋 弥吉	0	1887	Tsushima Island	1919	1920	demoted
Tachihikari Denemon	太刀光 電右エ門	0	1897	Mikasa, Hokkaido	1923	1927	demoted
Ōnosato Mansuke	大ノ里 萬助	0	1892	Minamitsugaru District, Aomori	1925	1932	retired
Toyokuni Fukuma	豊國 福馬	2	1893	Ōita, Ōita	1927	1930	retired
Noshirogata Kinsaku	能代潟 錦作	1	1895	Yamamoto, Akita	1927	1933	demoted*
Hitachiiwa Eitarō	常陸岩 英太郎	1	1900	Chūō, Tokyo	1927	1931	retired
Shimizugawa Motokichi	清水川 元吉	3	1900	Goshogawara, Aomori	1932	1937	retired
Kagamiiwa Zenshirō	鏡岩 善四郎	0	1902	Towada, Aomori	1937	1939	retired
Itsutsushima Narao	五ツ嶋 名良男	0	1912	Minami-Matsuura District, Nagasaki	1941	1942	demoted
Nayoroiwa Shizuo	名寄岩 静男	0	1914	Nayoro, Hokkaido	1943	1948	demoted*
Saganohana Katsumi	佐賀ノ花 勝巳	1	1917	Saga, Saga	1944	1951	demoted
Shionoumi Unemon	汐ノ海 運右エ門	0	1918	Himeji, Hyōgo	1947	1951	retired*
Masuiyama Daishirō I	増位山 大志郎	2	1919	Himeji, Hyōgo	1949	1950	retired
Mitsuneyama Keiji	三根山 繼司	1	1922	Arakawa, Tokyo	1953	1955	demoted
Ōuchiyama Heikichi	大内山 平吉	0	1926	Hitachinaka, Ibaraki	1955	1957	demoted
Matsunobori Shigeo	松登 晟郎	0	1924	Matsudo, Chiba	1956	1959	demoted
Kotogahama Sadao	琴ヶ濵 貞雄	0	1927	Kan'onji, Kagawa	1958	1962	retired
Wakahaguro Tomoaki	若羽黒 朋明	1	1934	Yokohama, Kanagawa	1959	1962	demoted
Kitabayama Hidetoshi	北葉山 英俊	1	1935	Muroran, Hokkaido	1961	1966	retired
Tochihikari Masayuki	栃光 正之	0	1933	Ushibuka, Kumamoto	1962	1966	retired
Yutakayama Katsuo	豊山 勝男	0	1937	Shibata, Niigata	1963	1968	retired
Kiyokuni Katsuo	清國 勝雄	1	1941	Ogachi, Akita	1969	1974	retired
Maenoyama Tarō	前の山 太郎	0	1945	Moriguchi, Osaka	1970	1972	demoted
Daikirin Takayoshi	大麒麟 將能	0	1942	Saga, Saga	1970	1974	retired
Takanohana Kenshi	貴ノ花 健士	2	1950	Hirosaki, Aomori	1972	1981	retired
Daiju Hisateru	大受 久晃	0	1950	Setana, Hokkaido	1973	1974	demoted
Kaiketsu Masateru	魁傑 將晃	2	1948	Yamaguchi, Yamaguchi	1975	1977	demoted*
Asahikuni Masuo	旭國 斗雄	0	1947	Aibetsu, Hokkaido	1976	1979	retired
Masuiyama Daishirō II	増位山 太志郎	0	1948	Himeji, Hyōgo	1980	1981	retired
Kotokaze Kōki	琴風 豪規	2	1957	Tsu, Mie	1981	1985	demoted
Wakashimazu Mutsuo	若嶋津 六夫	2	1957	Nakatane, Kagoshima	1983	1987	retired
Asashio Tarō IV	朝潮 太郎(4代)	1	1955	Muroto, Kōchi	1983	1989	retired
Hokuten'yū Katsuhiko	北天佑 勝彦	2	1960	Muroran, Hokkaido	1983	1990	retired
Konishiki Yasokichi	小錦 八十吉	3	1963	Honolulu, United States	1987	1994	demoted
Kirishima Kazuhiro	霧島 一博	1	1959	Makizono, Kagoshima	1990	1993	demoted
Takanonami Sadahiro	貴ノ浪 貞博	2	1971	Misawa, Aomori	1994	2000	demoted*
Chiyotaikai Ryūji	千代大海 龍二	3	1976	Chitose, Hokkaido	1999	2010	demoted
Dejima Takeharu	出島 武春	1	1974	Kanazawa, Ishikawa	1999	2001	demoted
Musōyama Masashi	武双山 正士	1	1972	Mito, Ibaraki	2000	2004	retired*
Miyabiyama Tetsushi	雅山 哲士之	0	1977	Mito, Ibaraki	2000	2001	demoted
Kaiō Hiroyuki	魁皇 博之	5	1972	Nōgata, Fukuoka	2000	2011	retired
Tochiazuma Daisuke	栃東 大裕	3	1976	Adachi, Tokyo	2002	2007	retired*
Kotoōshū Katsunori	琴欧洲 勝紀	1	1983	Veliko Tarnovo, Bulgaria	2006	2014	demoted
Kotomitsuki Keiji	琴光喜 啓司	1	1976	Okazaki, Aichi	2007	2010	dismissed
Baruto Kaito	把瑠都 凱斗	1	1984	Väike-Maarja, Estonia	2010	2013	demoted
Kotoshōgiku Kazuhiro	琴奨菊 和弘	1	1984	Yanagawa, Fukuoka	2011	2017	demoted
Gōeidō Gōtarō	豪栄道 豪太郎	1	1986	Neyagawa, Osaka	2014	2020	retired
Takayasu Akira	高安 晃	0	1990	Tsuchiura, Ibaraki	2017	2019	demoted
Tochinoshin Tsuyoshi	栃ノ心 剛史	1	1987	Mtskheta, Georgia	2018	2019	demoted*
Takakeishō Takanobu	貴景勝 貴信	4	1996	Ashiya, Hyōgo	2019	2024	demoted*
Asanoyama Hideki	朝乃山 英樹	1	1994	Toyama, Toyama	2020	2021	demoted
Shōdai Naoya	正代 直也	1	1991	Uto, Kumamoto	2020	2022	demoted
Mitakeumi Hisashi	御嶽海 久司	3	1992	Agematsu, Nagano	2022	2022	demoted
Kirishima Tetsuo	霧島 鐵力	3	1996	Dornod, Mongolia	2023	active	n/a*
Kotozakura Masakatsu II	琴櫻 将傑	1	1997	Matsudo, Chiba	2024	active	n/a
Aonishiki Arata	安青錦 新大	3	2004	Vinnytsia, Ukraine	2026	active	n/a*

* Wrestler held the rank on more than one occasion.

== See also ==
- Glossary of sumo terms
- List of active sumo wrestlers
- List of past sumo wrestlers
- List of sumo top division champions
- List of sumo top division runners-up
- List of yokozuna
- List of sekiwake
- List of komusubi
- Makuuchi
