= Akitsukaze Otoemon =

Japanese sumo wrestler

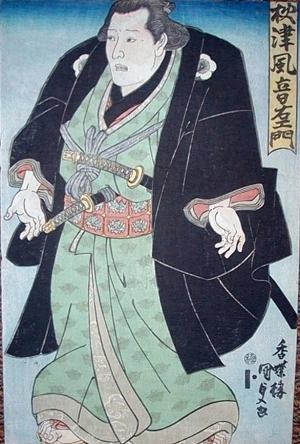
- Akitsukaze by Utagawa Kunisada (c. 1835)

Personal information
- Native name: 秋津風 音右エ門
- Born: Denzō Akedo; 1797 Sannohe, Mutsu Province, Japan
- Died: January 4, 1838 (aged 40–41)

Sport
- Sport: Sumo
- Retired: January, 1835
- Heya: Nishonoseki → Yotsugamine
- Record: 82-54-96-17 draws/4 holds
- Debut: October, 1818
- Highest rank: Ōzeki (November, 1834)
- Elder name: Takekuma
- Updated on October 2023

Akitsukaze Otoemon (Japanese: 秋津風 音右エ門; born Denzō Akedo (明戸 伝蔵, Akedo Denzō), 1797 – January 4, 1838) was a Japanese professional sumo wrestler from Sannohe, Mutsu Province (now in Aomori Prefecture). His highest rank was ōzeki. He is the second wrestler from Aomori Prefecture to have been promoted to this rank, since Kashiwado in 1815, 19 years earlier, and the last until the promotion of Ichinoya in 1889, 55 years later.

== Career ==
Akitsukaze was an employee of the lord of Hachinohe. He made his wrestling debut in 1818, first joining Nishonoseki's stable and then breaching off to join Yotsugamine stable under the tutelage of former ōzeki Yotsugamine, who was also wrestling for Nishonoseki stable. He began to wrestle directly in the jūryō division under the shikona, or ring name, Chitosegawa Otomatsu (千年川 音松). He rose rapidly, reaching the ranks of san'yaku for the October 1824 tournament, after a good performance in the first tournament of that year, having been beaten in score only by the championship winner: Ōnomatsu (then known as Koyanagi). He briefly changed his ring name to Tetsuoiyama Keikichi (鉄生山 珪吉) then to Akitsukaze in 1828, an archaic word to evoke a dragonfly, an animal renowned for always moving forward and synonymous with good omens in sumo wrestling. In 1826, he obtained the patronage of the Hachinohe Domain, henceforth wrestling under their influence. Throughout his career he maintained a good score against Kashiwado when the latter was a dominant wrestler, even recording two consecutive victories over him in 1823 and 1824.

In 1834, the rankings underwent a series of upheavals, notably caused by the absence of the dominant yokozuna Inazuma. Hiodoshi II, another ōzeki, also stopped participating in a series of tournaments, forcing the Edo-based sumo association to briefly reintroduce the kanban-ōzeki (看板大関) system, or 'guest ōzeki system', which had been abolished since the Bunka era, 30 years earlier. To ensure a balanced ranking, Akitsukaze was also promoted to ōzeki for this tournament, as a reward for his many years of maintaining status in the san'yaku ranks.

However, after only one tournament, Akitsukaze was demoted to the rank of maegashira 2, a severe demotion. The reason for this demotion was theorized to be his absence during his first tournament at ōzeki rank, which had displeased the sumo association's executives. Akitsukaze competed in that last tournament and retired at the end of it, probably due to his age as he was already 36 years old at the time.

== Top division record ==
- The actual time the tournaments were held during the year in this period often varied.

Akitsukaze Otoemon
| - | Spring | Winter |
|---|---|---|
| 1818 | Unknown | West Jūryō #9; 5–2; 1d-2h |
| 1819 | West Jūryō #4; 7–3 | West Jūryō #5; 0–1 |
| 1820 | West Jūryō #5; 0–1 | West Jūryō #2; 3–4; 1d |
| 1821 | West Jūryō #1; 3–3; 1h | West Maegashira #5; 4–4–1; 1d |
| 1822 | West Maegashira #7; 3–4–2; 1d | West Maegashira #4; 6–2–1; 1d |
| 1823 | West Maegashira #3; 4–2; 1d | West Maegashira #2; 4–2–2; 1h |
| 1824 | West Maegashira #1; 7–1–2 | Sat out |
| 1825 | Sat out | Sat out |
| 1826 | Sat out | Unknown |
| 1827 | Unknown | Unknown |
| 1828 | Unknown | West Komusubi #2; 2–4–1; 2d |
| 1829 | West Komusubi #1; 3–2–2 | West Komusubi #1; 4–4–2 |
| 1830 | West Komusubi #1; 4–2–4 | West Komusubi #1; 1–4–4; 1d |
| 1831 | West Komusubi #1; 3–4–1; 1d | West Komusubi #1; 3–0–2; 3d |
| 1832 | West Komusubi #1; 7–2; 1d | Unknown |
| 1833 | West Komusubi #1; 3–0–4; 2d | West Sekiwake #1; 3–0–5 |
| 1834 | West Sekiwake #1; 2–1–7 | West Ōzeki #1; 0–0–10 |
| 1835 | West Maegashira #2; Retired; 1–2–6; 1d | x |
Record given as win-loss-absent Top Division Champion Top Division Runner-up Retired Lower Divisions Key:d=Draw(s) (引分); h=Hold(s) (預り); Divisions: Makuuchi — Jūryō — Makushita — Sandanme — Jonidan — Jonokuchi Makuuchi ranks: Yokozuna — Ōzeki — Sekiwake — Komusubi — Maegashira

*Championships for the best record in a tournament were not recognized or awarded before the 1909 summer tournament and the above championships that are labelled "unofficial" are historically conferred. For more information see yūshō.

== See also ==
- Glossary of sumo terms
- List of past sumo wrestlers
- List of ōzeki
