= Hiraiwa Shichidayū II =

Japanese sumo wrestler (born 1801)

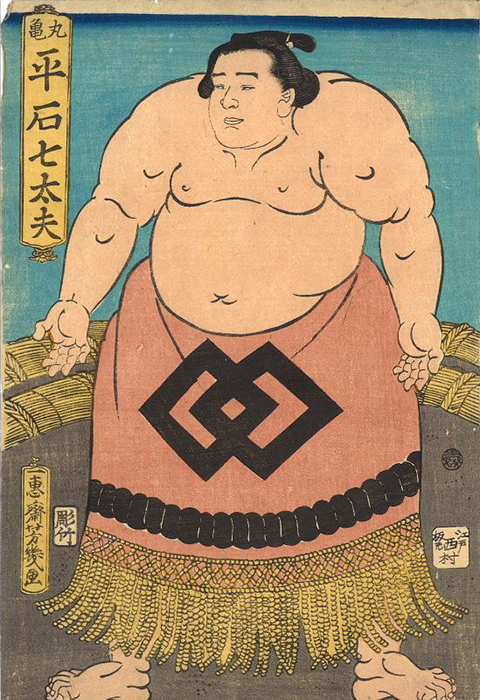

Personal information
- Native name: 平石 七太夫 (2代)
- Born: 1801 Edo, Musashi Province, Japan
- Died: February 19, 1855 (aged 53–54)
- Height: 1.82 m (5 ft 11 1/2 in)
- Weight: 129 kg (284 lb; 20.3 st)

Sport
- Sport: Sumo
- Retired: February, 1840
- Heya: Tokiwayama → Kumegawa → Ikazuchi
- Record: 83-35-57-13 draws/4 holds
- Debut: February 1818
- Highest rank: Ōzeki (March, 1839)
- Elder name: Kumegawa
- Updated on October 2023

Hiraiwa Shichidayū (Japanese: 平石 七太夫; 1801 – February 19, 1855) was a Japanese sumo wrestler from Edo, Musashi Province (now Tokyo). His highest rank was ōzeki. He is the first wrestler from Tokyo to have been promoted to this rank and the last until the promotion of Isenohama in 1914, 75 years later.

== Career ==
Little is known about Hiraiwa. He began his wrestling career by joining Tokiwayama stable in the Edo-based sumo association. He eventually joined Kumegawa stable and made his debut in February 1818.

Upon promotion to the jūryō division in February 1829, he was given the shikona, or ring name, Nanatsushima Hamagorō (七ツ島 濱五郎), but later changed it for Wadanoura Hamagorō (和田ノ浦 濱五郎). He reached the makuuchi division in February 1831. In 1835 he changed his shikona again to Hiraiwa Shichidayū (平石 七太夫) to evoke an early 19th-century ōzeki from Tottori prefecture. He was recruited as a wrestler for the Marugame Domain and made his san'yaku debut in 1836, reaching the rank of komusubi in February and sekiwake in November. After spending three years in the junior ranks of san'yaku, he was finally promoted to ōzeki in March 1839 because Kotōzan was demoted from that same rank for that tournament, leaving the ranking unbalanced. He maintained his rank for only one tournament and was demoted to the rank of sekiwake before regaining promotion for a single tournament before retiring.

After his retirement as a wrestler, he became an elder under the name Kumegawa, becoming a leading figure in the Sumo Association. His tomb is located on the site of the Nanzo-in temple in Toshima, Tokyo. With him is buried the sixth generations of Kumegawa (makushita-wrestler Kiryūzan Reihachi I), as was traditional at the time.

His ring name was later inherited by sekiwake Hiraiwa III in 1867.

== Top division record ==
- The actual time the tournaments were held during the year in this period often varied.

Hiraiwa Shichidayū
-	Spring	Winter
1829	West Jūryō #9; 6–0	East Jūryō #5; 3–3; 2d-1h
1830	East Jūryō #3; 1–3	East Jūryō #3; 4–2; 1d-1h
1831	West Maegashira #7; 2–2–6	West Maegashira #7; 3–1–2; 1d-1h
1832	West Maegashira #7; 7–3	Unknown
1833	West Maegashira #5; 2–2–5; 1h	West Maegashira #3; 5–2–1
1834	West Maegashira #3; 6–3; 1d	West Maegashira #2; 5–1–2; 1d
1835	West Maegashira #1; 4–1–3; 1d	West Maegashira #2; 4–3–2; 1d
1836	East Komusubi #1; 3–1; 2d	West Sekiwake #1; 5–1–3; 1d
1837	West Komusubi #1; 3–1–5; 1d	East Komusubi #1; 4–1–4; 1d
1838	East Sekiwake #1; 3–1–2	East Sekiwake #1; 4–2–3
1839	East Ōzeki #2; 3–1–6	East Sekiwake #1; 3–0–7
1840	East Ōzeki #1; Retired; 3–1–6	x
Record given as win-loss-absent Top Division Champion Top Division Runner-up Retired Lower Divisions Key:d=Draw(s) (引分); h=Hold(s) (預り); Divisions: Makuuchi — Jūryō — Makushita — Sandanme — Jonidan — Jonokuchi Makuuchi ranks: Yokozuna — Ōzeki — Sekiwake — Komusubi — Maegashira

*Championships for the best record in a tournament were not recognized or awarded before the 1909 summer tournament and the above championships that are labelled "unofficial" are historically conferred. For more information see yūshō.

== See also ==
- Glossary of sumo terms
- List of past sumo wrestlers
- List of ōzeki
