= Kaigatake Ryūemon =

Japanese sumo wrestler

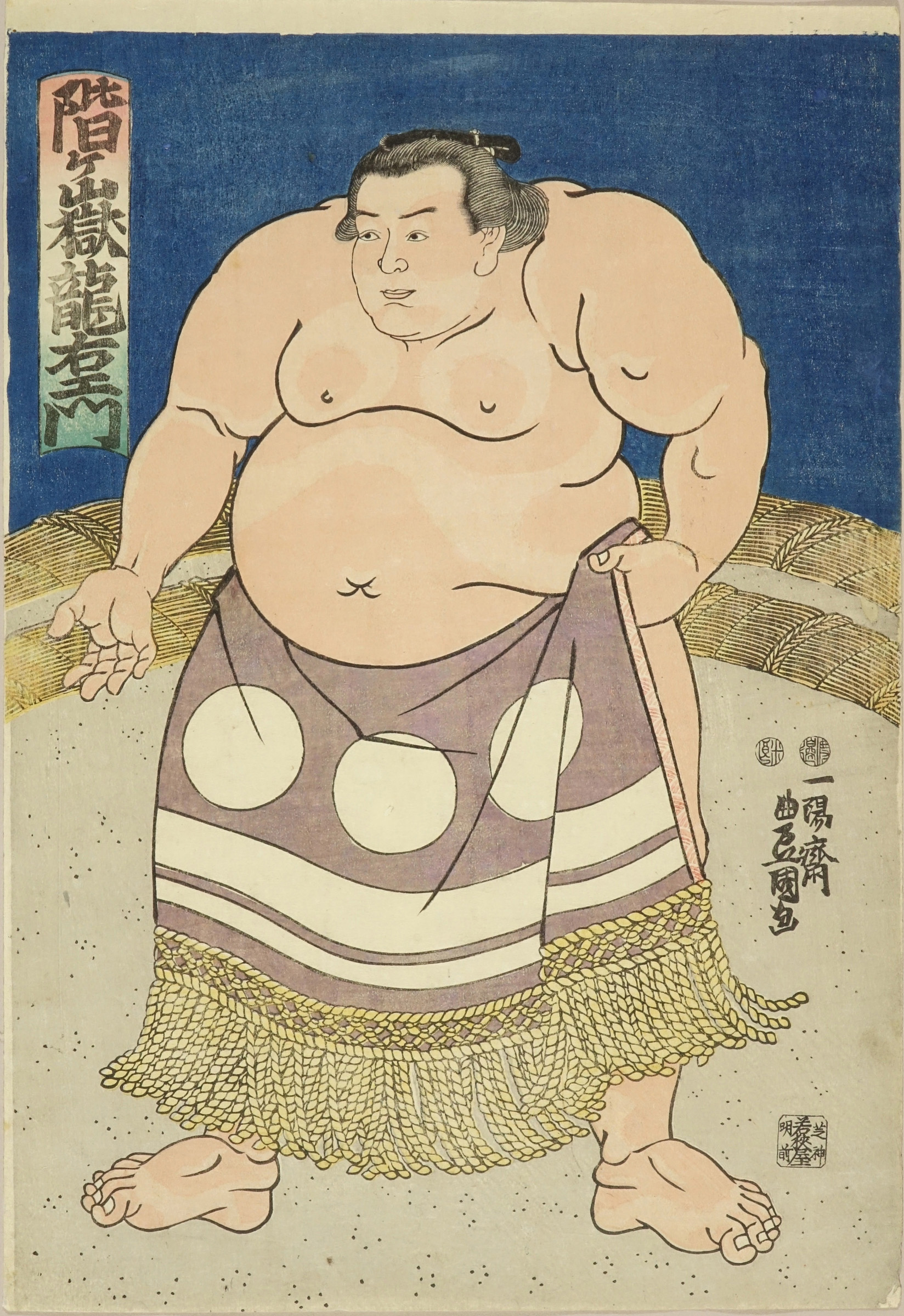

Personal information
- Native name: 階ヶ嶽 龍右エ門
- Born: Iwajirō Takabatake; 1817 Tonami District, Etchū Province, Japan
- Died: October 23, 1868 (aged 50–51)
- Height: 1.88 m (6 ft 2 in)
- Weight: 131 kg (289 lb)

Sport
- Sport: Sumo
- Retired: January, 1859
- Heya: Nishonoseki → Ikazuchi → Otowayama
- Record: 77-40-80-7 draws/4 holds
- Debut: October, 1840
- Highest rank: Ōzeki (November, 1856)
- Elder name: Kumagatani
- Championships: 2 (Makuuchi, unofficial)
- Updated on October 2023

Kaigatake Ryūemon (Japanese: 階ヶ嶽 龍右エ門; born Iwajirō Takabatake (高畠 岩次郎, Takabatake Iwajirō), 1817 – October 23, 1868) was a Japanese sumo wrestler from Tonami District, Etchū Province (now Takaoka, Toyama Prefecture). His highest rank was ōzeki. He was the second wrestler from Toyama prefecture, since Tsurugizan, to be promoted to this rank and the last title-holder until Umegatani II's promotion in 1900, 44 years later.

== Career ==
Kaigatake was born the eldest son of an unknown famer. Because he was strong, he took part in local amateur sumo tournaments, serving as a local ōzeki. He eventually decided to become a professional wrestler and joined the Edo-based sumo association. He first joined Nishonoseki stable and began his career directly in the jūryō division under the shikona, or ring name, Kaigatake Ryūemon (階ヶ嶽 龍右エ門). In 1845 he entered the service of the Hachinohe Domain, continuing to wrestle under the influence of these powerful patrons, and in 1848 he was promoted to sumo's highest division, makuuchi.

Although, he was never promoted quickly and struggled at the bottom of the division for five years, before being promoted to komusubi in 1853, he showed great abilities by defeating seasoned wrestlers such as Koyanagi and Inagawa. In the second tournament of 1853, however, he lost the Hachinohe patronage and was recruited by the Morioka Domain. In 1856 he was promoted to the highest rank in sumo at that time, ōzeki. However, he fought only two tournaments at this rank before being demoted to sekiwake, ending his career at the top of the san'yaku ranks without ever managing to be promoted again.

In 1858, he inherited the name Kumagatani and became an elder while continuing to wrestle under the two-license system, changing his shikona to Kumagatani Ryūemon (熊ヶ谷 龍右エ門). He retired from wrestling the following year after he injured his hand in a match against maegashira Shiramayumi, and devoted himself to training wrestlers in his last stable. In 1862, he left the Sumo Association and returned to his hometown to teach sumo there. He died on October 23, 1868, at the age of 51.

On 28 December 2021, a series of ukiyo-e painted by Utagawa Kunisada and dedicated to Kaigatake was donated to the Takaoka museum to raise awareness of the wrestler. The museum already had several objects in its collections that had belonged to him, such as his akeni.

== Top division record ==
- The actual time the tournaments were held during the year in this period often varied.

Kaigatake Ryūemon
-	Spring	Summer
1847	West Jūryō #8; 5–2	West Jūryō #2; 3–6
1848	West Maegashira #7; 3–4–1; 2d	West Maegashira #7; 7–2–1; 1h
1849	West Maegashira #8; 7–1–2; Unofficial	West Maegashira #5; 7–0–2; Unofficial
1850	West Maegashira #4; 3–1–6	West Maegashira #2; 5–4–1
1851	West Maegashira #1; 3–0; 1d-1h	West Maegashira #1; 3–3–4
1852	Sat out	West Maegashira #1; 5–4–1
1853	West Komusubi #1; 4–3–2; 1h	West Komusubi #1; 3–3–2; 2d
1854	West Komusubi #1; 3–1–6	West Maegashira #1; 6–2–1; 1d
1855	Sat out	Unknown
1856	West Sekiwake #1; 4–1–4; 1h	West Ōzeki #1; 5–2–2; 1d
1857	West Ōzeki #1; 0–0–8	West Sekiwake #1; 1–1–8
1858	East Sekiwake #1; 0–0–10	Sat out
1859	East Sekiwake #1; Retired; 0–0–10	x
Record given as win-loss-absent Top Division Champion Top Division Runner-up Retired Lower Divisions Key:d=Draw(s) (引分); h=Hold(s) (預り); Divisions: Makuuchi — Jūryō — Makushita — Sandanme — Jonidan — Jonokuchi Makuuchi ranks: Yokozuna — Ōzeki — Sekiwake — Komusubi — Maegashira

*Championships for the best record in a tournament were not recognized or awarded before the 1909 summer tournament and the above championships that are labelled "unofficial" are historically conferred. For more information see yūshō.

== See also ==
- Glossary of sumo terms
- List of past sumo wrestlers
- List of ōzeki
