= Iwamigata Jōemon =

Japanese sumo wrestler

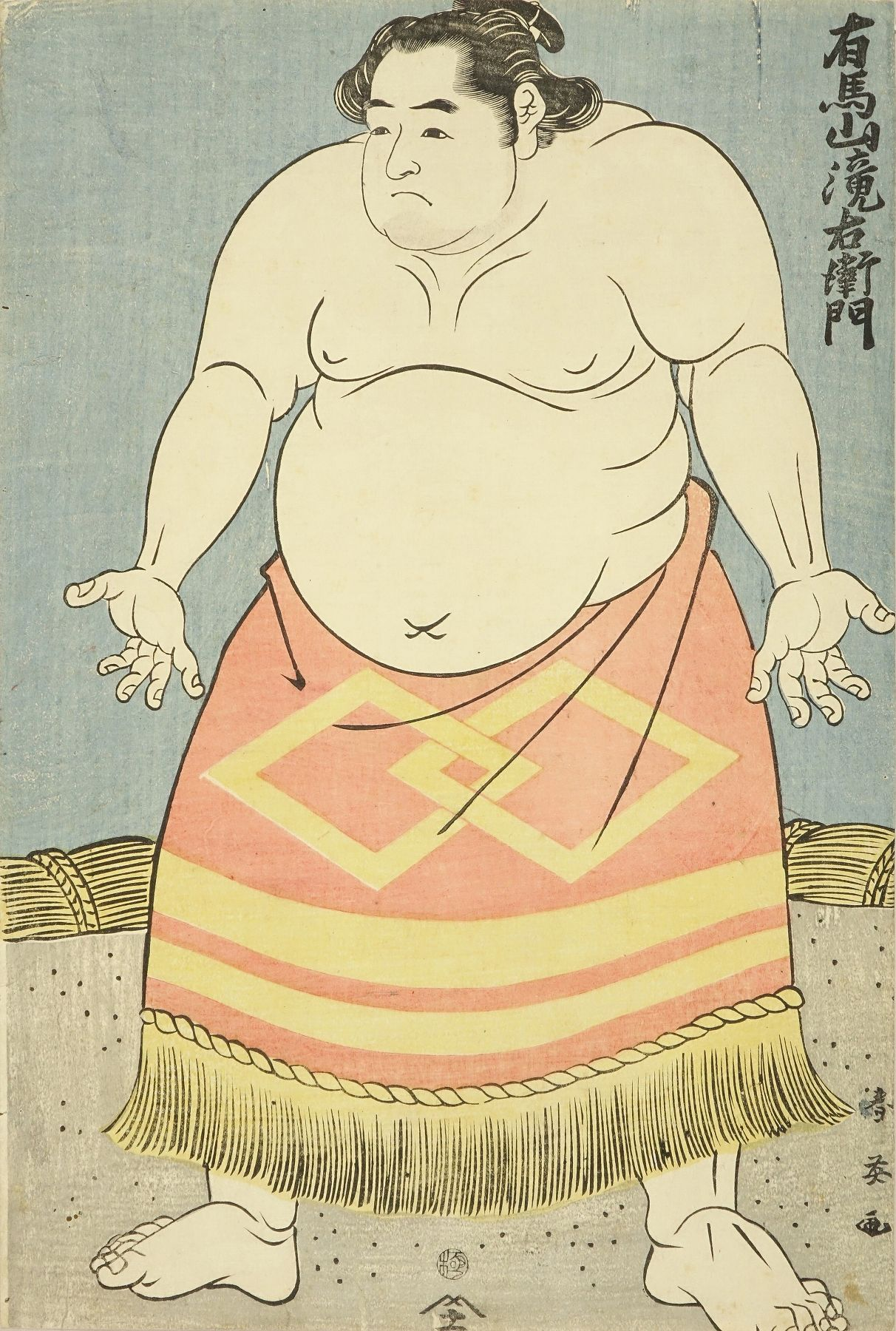
- Iwamigata Jōemon when he was still known as Arimayama Takiemon (c. 1819)

Personal information
- Native name: 岩見潟 丈右エ門
- Born: 1785 Muko District, Settsu Province, Japan
- Died: February 8, 1835 (aged 49–50)
- Height: 1.82 m (5 ft 11 1/2 in)
- Weight: 135 kg (298 lb)

Sport
- Sport: Sumo
- Retired: January, 1824
- Heya: Onogawa → Katsunoura
- Record: 95-45-41-8 draws/6 holds
- Debut: October, 1808 (Edo-sumo)
- Highest rank: Ōzeki (October, 1821)
- Elder name: Onogawa
- Updated on October 2023

Iwamigata Jōemon (Japanese: 岩見潟 丈右エ門; 1785 – February 8, 1835) was a Japanese sumo wrestler from Muko District, Settsu Province (now Nishinomiya, Hyōgo Prefecture). His highest rank was ōzeki. He is the first wrestler from Hyōgo Prefecture to have been promoted to this rank and the last until the promotion of Ōnaruto II in 1890, 69 years later.

== Career ==
Iwamigata began his professional wrestling career by joining the Osaka-based sumo association, and was taken under the eldership of Onogawa. In 1808 he joined the association based in Edo and wrestled under the teachings of former maegashira Katsunoura, who ran the eponymous stable. In 1871 he adopted the shikona, or ring name, Tsuzumigataki Chōemon (鼓ヶ滝 調右エ門). In November 1813, he was promoted to sumo's highest division, makuuchi. Upon promotion he received the patronage of the Matsue Domain.

In 1818, he was promoted to the rank of sekiwake and tried to change his shikona to Onogawa to evoke his former master in Osaka. However, he was not allowed to use this name by the Hizen-Arima clan, who were Onogawa's patrons and who had moral authority over the name "Onogawa", and by the Yoshida family, who argued that the Onogawa shikona could only belong to a wrestler who had obtained a yokozuna licence. Instead of Onogawa, he finally adopted the shikona Arimayama Takiemon (有馬山 滝右エ門) and was transferred under the authority of the Nanbu clan. At the time, the change of name was the subject of debate, with some attributing it to a tribute to a hydrothermal mountain not far from his region of origin and others arguing that it was a dig at the narrow-mindedness of the Arima clan, which had refused to give him the name Onogawa.

During his career, he showed solid results but never managed to win the equivalent of a championship, failing in particular at the first tournament in 1819 against Kashiwado Risuke who, being better ranked than Iwamigata at the time, won the tournament with the same number of victories as Iwamigata, as was customary at the time. Iwamigata also failed twice more against Kashiwado in the first tournaments of 1820 and 1822. Despite the fact that he never managed to win the equivalent of a tournament, Iwamigata was promoted to ōzeki for the last tournament in 1821, because Tamagaki failed to enroll in that tournament. He held the rank of ōzeki for two tournaments before being demoted back to sekiwake in October 1822. After his demotion, he took his definitive shikona of Iwamigata. He retired in January 1824.

Nine years after his retirement, he remained in the sumo association as an elder under the name Onogawa, becoming the sixth generation of this coaching name. He died on 8 February 1835.

Iwamigata is the protagonist of the poem 'Why Arimayama can't become Onogawa?' (小野川になられぬわけが有馬山), recounting his struggles to acquire the name of his former master.

== Top division record ==
- The actual time the tournaments were held during the year in this period often varied.

Iwamigata Jōemon
-	Spring	Summer
1811	West Jūryō #10; 3–1; 2d	West Jūryō #9; 2–5; 1h
1812	West Jūryō #8; 2–3	West Jūryō #6; 2–4; 1d
1813	West Jūryō #1; 2–3; 1d-1h	Sat out
1814	Unknown	West Maegashira #5; 5–3–1; 1h
1815	West Maegashira #3; 4–1–2; 1d-1h	Unknown
1816	Unknown	West Maegashira #3; 6–3–1
1817	West Maegashira #2; 6–2–2	West Maegashira #1; 5–1–3; 1d
1818	Unknown	West Sekiwake #1; 6–2–1; 1d
1819	West Sekiwake #1; 5–1–2; 1h	West Sekiwake #1; 7–2–1
1820	West Sekiwake #1; 4–0–1	West Komusubi #1; 6–2–1
1821	West Sekiwake #1; 5–2–1	West Ōzeki #1; 5–3–2
1822	West Ōzeki #1; 7–2	West Sekiwake #1; 5–2–2
1823	West Sekiwake #1; 6–1	West Sekiwake #1; 2–2–2; 1d-1h
1824	West Sekiwake #1; Retired; 0–0–10	x
Record given as win-loss-absent Top Division Champion Top Division Runner-up Retired Lower Divisions Key:d=Draw(s) (引分); h=Hold(s) (預り); Divisions: Makuuchi — Jūryō — Makushita — Sandanme — Jonidan — Jonokuchi Makuuchi ranks: Yokozuna — Ōzeki — Sekiwake — Komusubi — Maegashira

*Championships for the best record in a tournament were not recognized or awarded before the 1909 summer tournament and the above championships that are labelled "unofficial" are historically conferred. For more information see yūshō.

== See also ==
- Glossary of sumo terms
- List of past sumo wrestlers
- List of ōzeki
