= Sendagawa Kichizō =

Japanese sumo wrestler

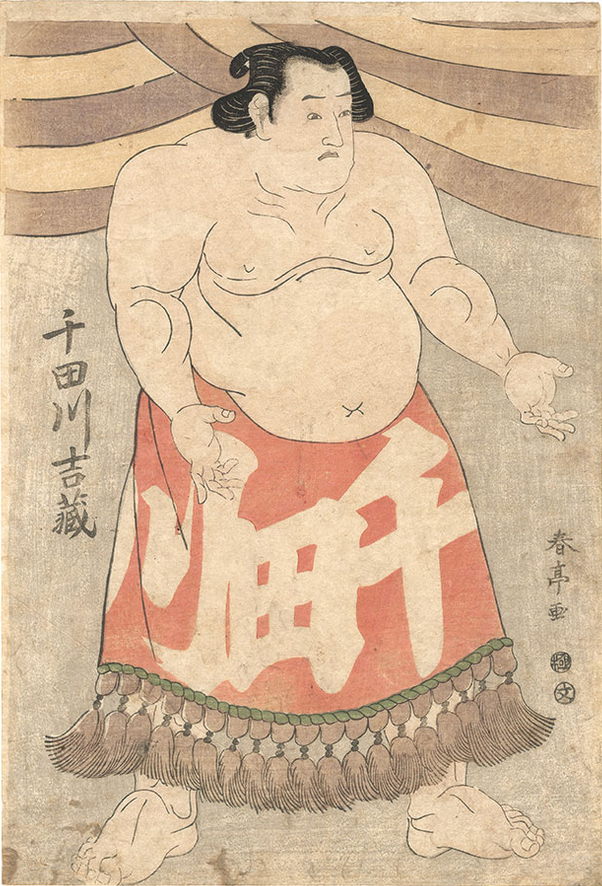
- Sendagawa by Katsukawa Shuntei

Personal information
- Native name: 千田川 吉藏
- Born: Kumakichi Mera; 1793 Muro District, Kii Province, Japan
- Died: January 8, 1828 (aged 34–35)
- Height: 1.88 m (6 ft 2 in)

Sport
- Sport: Sumo
- Retired: February, 1823 (Edo-sumo)
- Heya: Asahiyama → Manazuru → Tamagaki
- Record: 57-36-38-3 draws/2 holds
- Debut: November, 1814 (Edo-sumo)
- Highest rank: Ōzeki (March, 1815)
- Updated on October 2023

Sendagawa Kichizō (Japanese: 千田川 吉藏; born Kumakichi Mera (目良 熊吉, Mera Kumakichi), 1793 – January 8, 1828) was a Japanese sumo wrestler from Muro District, Kii Province (now Tanabe, Wakayama Prefecture). His highest rank was ōzeki. As of March 1815 he is the only wrestler from Wakayama Prefecture to have been promoted to sumo's second highest rank.

== Career ==
Sendagawa began his wrestling career in the Osaka-based sumo association. He initially joined Asahiyama stable but eventually joined Manazuru stable, under the tutelage of maegashira Manazuru Masakichi, who ran his stable under the two-licence system. In Osaka he reached the top of the rankings and decided to go to Edo in 1814. There he was recruited by former ōzeki Tamagaki Gakunosuke. Because of his past prowess in Osaka, he was allowed to start directly at the rank of sekiwake and was recruited by the Kishū Domain which became his patron. His master Tamagaki also gave him his old Sendagawa shikona, or ring name. In 1815 Tamagaki IV did not enter the tournament and Sendagawa was promoted to ōzeki because the rankings were unbalanced.

Sendagawa only remained ōzeki for one tournament and continued the rest of his career in the junior ranks of san'yaku under Tamagaki IV, who had become his master in 1814 following the death of Gakunosuke. Between 1821 and 1822 he stopped taking part in tournaments and retired from the Edo-based sumo association in 1823, deciding to return to Osaka. There, he served as an ōzeki at tournaments in 1827 and 1828. For unknown reasons, however, he died on 8 January 1829, although he had not yet retired. A tomb bearing his name can be found at the Jizō-ji temple in his home town of Tanabe.

In the Tamagaki stable, the name Sendagawa became a legacy and was borne in particular by wrestlers who all reached the makuuchi division between 1845 and 1858. One of them, Sendagawa Kichigorō, is credited with being the first generation of the Sendagawa elder share which is an elder name still used by the Japan Sumo Association.

== Tokyo-sumo record ==
- The actual time the tournaments were held during the year in this period often varied.

Sendagawa Kichizō
-	Spring	Summer
1814	x	West Sekiwake #1; 6–3; 1h
1815	West Ōzeki #1; 3–4–1; 1h	West Sekiwake #1; 5–3
1816	West Sekiwake #1; 4–2–1; 1d	West Sekiwake #1; 5–3; 1d
1817	West Komusubi #1; 2–2–4	East Komusubi #1; 6–2
1818	West Sekiwake #1; 5–3–1	East Sekiwake #1; 4–3–2
1819	East Komusubi #1; 5–2–1	West Maegashira #1; 3–3–2; 1d
1820	West Maegashira #1; 3–2	East Komusubi #1; 4–4–1
1821	Sat out	Unknown
1822	Sat out	Unknown
1823	West Maegashira #1; Retired; 2–0–5	x
Record given as win-loss-absent Top Division Champion Top Division Runner-up Retired Lower Divisions Key:d=Draw(s) (引分); h=Hold(s) (預り); Divisions: Makuuchi — Jūryō — Makushita — Sandanme — Jonidan — Jonokuchi Makuuchi ranks: Yokozuna — Ōzeki — Sekiwake — Komusubi — Maegashira

*Championships for the best record in a tournament were not recognized or awarded before the 1909 summer tournament and the above championships that are labelled "unofficial" are historically conferred. For more information see yūshō.

== See also ==
- Glossary of sumo terms
- List of past sumo wrestlers
- List of ōzeki
