= Iōzan Moriemon =

Japanese sumo wrestler

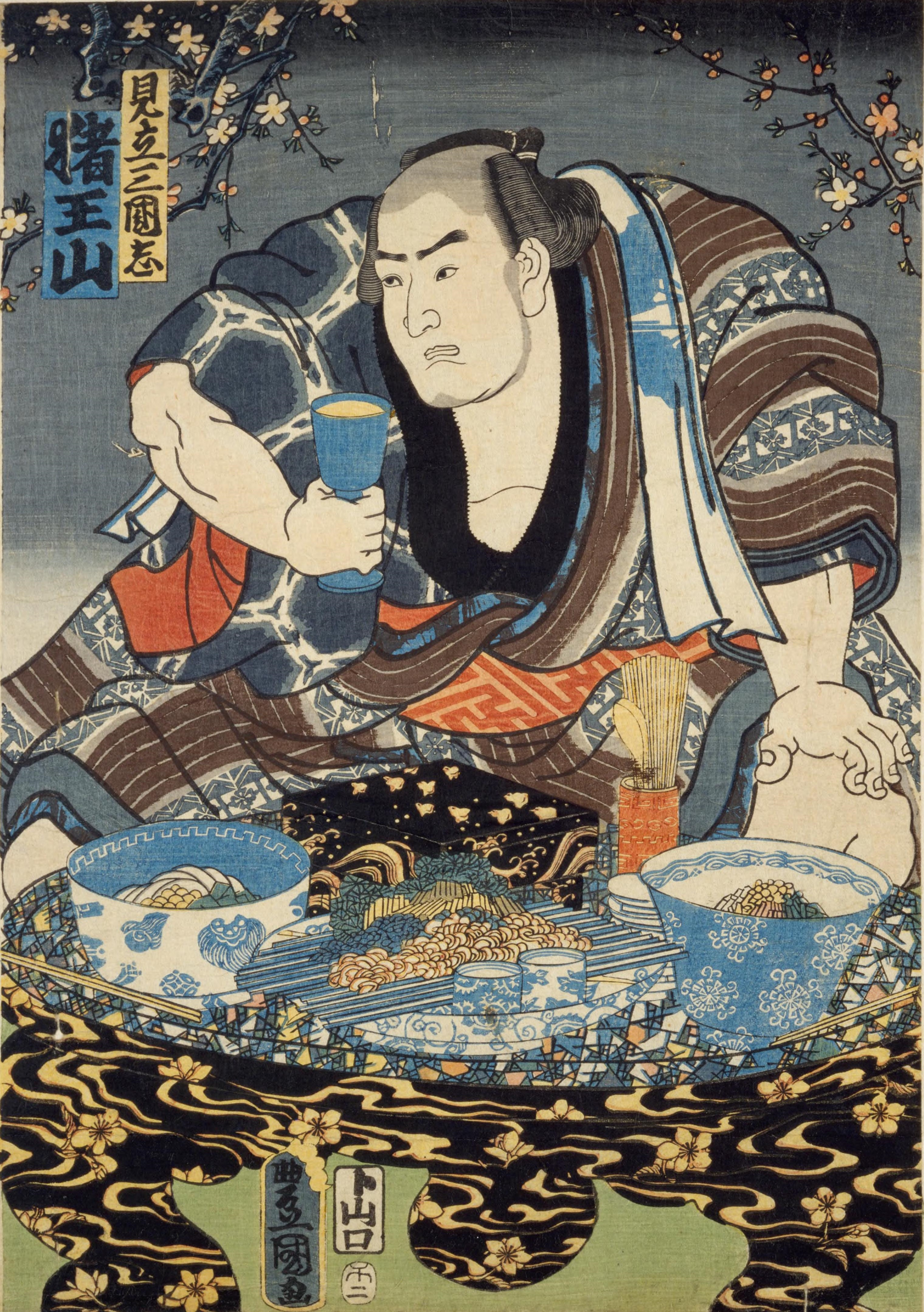

Personal information
- Native name: 猪王山 森右エ門
- Born: Katsushirō Katō; 1815 Monou District, Mutsu Province, Japan
- Died: April 25, 1872 (aged 56–57)

Sport
- Sport: Sumo
- Retired: February, 1860
- Heya: Isenoumi
- Record: 117-51-49-22 draws/11 holds
- Debut: November, 1839
- Highest rank: Ōzeki (November, 1856)
- Championships: 2 (Makuuchi, unofficial)
- Updated on October 2023

Iōzan Moriemon (Japanese: 猪王山 森右エ門; born Katsushirō Katō (加藤 勝四郎, Katō Katsushirō), 1815 – April 25, 1872) was a Japanese sumo wrestler from Monou District, Mutsu Province (now Ishinomaki, Miyagi Prefecture). His highest rank was ōzeki. He is the seventh wrestler from Miyagi Prefecture to have been promoted to this rank and the first since Hidenoyama in 1841, 15 years earlier. He is also the last wrestler to hold that title until the promotion of Ōtohira in 1893, 37 years later.

== Career ==
Iōzan began his career by joining Isenoumi stable, a stable famous for having produced yokozuna Tanikaze and ōzeki Raiden and Kashiwado. He first wrestled in November 1839 under the shikona, or ring name, Dategaseki (達ヶ関) to evoke the dominant Tanikaze who bore this ring name. In 1846 he reached the makuuchi division, changing his shikona soon after to Iōzan (猪王山). He received the support of the Sendai Domain, now fighting under the protection of this powerful patron. During the same year he was promoted to komusubi, making his san'yaku debut. A popular tale says that he was later traded to the Inaba clan in exchange for uguisu, a highly prized and popular bird in Edo.

Iōzan was promoted to ōzeki in November 1856, but could only maintain his rank for four tournaments and was demoted back to sekiwake in 1859. He retired in February 1860.

He is said to be an exceptionally heavy drinker, always under the influence of alcohol when entering the ring.

== Top division record ==
- The actual time the tournaments were held during the year in this period often varied.

Iōzan Moriemon
-	Spring	Summer
1845	Unknown	East Jūryō #1; 6–3; 1d
1846	East Maegashira #8; 5–3–2	West Maegashira #9; 4–2–2; 2h
1847	West Maegashira #8; 4–2–4	West Maegashira #4; 4–2–2; 1d
1848	West Maegashira #3; 6–2–1; 1d	West Maegashira #3; 3–2–4; 1h
1849	West Maegashira #2; 5–1–3; 1h	West Maegashira #1; 4–2–3; 1d
1850	East Maegashira #1; 3–1–2; 3d-1h	East Komusubi #1; 7–0–1; 2d Unofficial
1851	East Komusubi #1; 3–0–1; 1d	East Komusubi #1; 3–2–4; 1d
1852	East Komusubi #1; 7–1–1; 1d	East Sekiwake #1; 6–1–1; 1h
1853	East Sekiwake #1; 6–1–2	East Sekiwake #1; 4–1–3; 1d-1h
1854	East Sekiwake #1; 2–4–3; 1d	East Sekiwake #1; 6–2–1; 1h
1855	Sat out	Unknown
1856	East Sekiwake #1; 3–3–2; 2h	East Ōzeki #1; 5–2–2; 1d
1857	East Ōzeki #1; 6–0; 1d-1h Unofficial	East Ōzeki #1; 6–2–1; 1d
1858	West Ōzeki #1; 3–4–1; 2d	Unknown
1859	Unknown	West Sekiwake #1; 4–3–2; 1d
1860	West Sekiwake #1; Retired; 2–5–1; 2d	x
Record given as win-loss-absent Top Division Champion Top Division Runner-up Retired Lower Divisions Key:d=Draw(s) (引分); h=Hold(s) (預り); Divisions: Makuuchi — Jūryō — Makushita — Sandanme — Jonidan — Jonokuchi Makuuchi ranks: Yokozuna — Ōzeki — Sekiwake — Komusubi — Maegashira

*Championships for the best record in a tournament were not recognized or awarded before the 1909 summer tournament and the above championships that are labelled "unofficial" are historically conferred. For more information see yūshō.

== See also ==
- Glossary of sumo terms
- List of past sumo wrestlers
- List of ōzeki
