= Ōtohira Hirokichi =

Japanese sumo wrestler

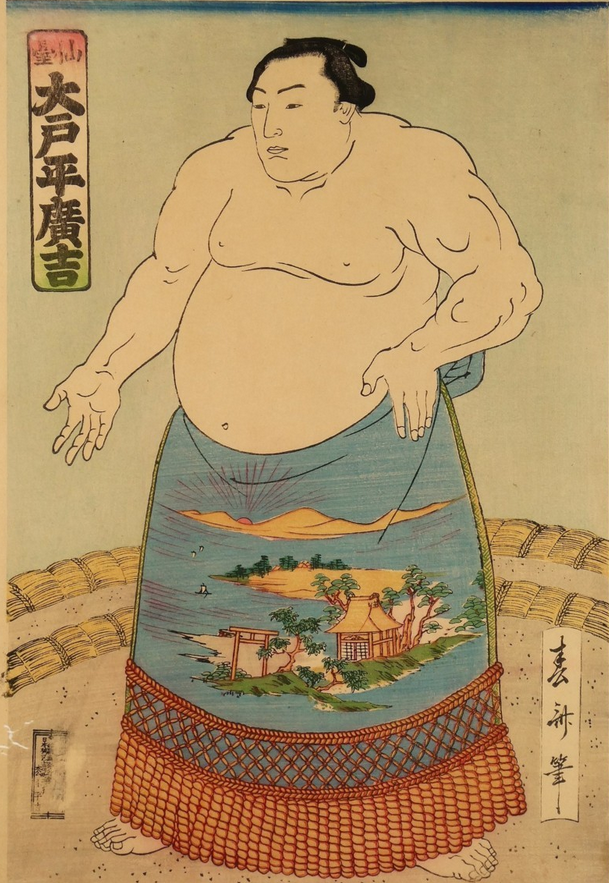

Personal information
- Native name: 大戸平 廣吉
- Born: Ōta Hirokichi; August, 1866 Miyagi District, Mutsu Province, Japan
- Died: March 13, 1916 (aged 49)
- Height: 1.75 m (5 ft 9 in)
- Weight: 101 kg (223 lb)

Sport
- Sport: Sumo
- Retired: January, 1899
- Heya: Oguruma
- Record: 73-26-72-3 draws/3 holds
- Debut: May, 1885
- Highest rank: Ōzeki (January, 1893)
- Elder name: Oguruma
- Championships: 2 (unofficial)
- Updated on September, 2023

Ōtohira Hirokichi (大戸平 廣吉; August 1866 – March 13, 1916) was a Japanese professional sumo wrestler from Miyagi District, Mutsu Province (now Sendai, Miyagi Prefecture).

== History ==
He was born as the second son of a farming family. Known for his strong physique, he became an amateur sumo wrestler in his hometown, serving as a local ōzeki. Eventually, he decided to become a professional sumo wrestler (rikishi) and went to the Tokyo-based Sumo Association. There, he joined Oguruma stable, under former maegashira Katsuyama.

He made his professional debut in May 1885 and rose steadily through the ranks. He quickly gained in popularity thanks to his muscular body. He was promoted to the top division of sumo for the May 1891 tournament and, in January 1892, he won the tournament, which propelled him directly to the rank of sekiwake. Following a very good score at this rank, he was promoted to the rank of ōzeki for the January 1893 tournament. In his first tournament at this rank, he remained undefeated and won his second tournament. However, as the yūshō system was not introduced until 1909, these championship victories are now considered unofficial. Since unbeaten and with two championships, commentators theorised about a possible promotion to yokozuna and presented Ōtohira as a serious threat to the dominant reign of the then-ōzeki Konishiki, who was also on a yokozuna run after his perfect May 1892 tournament. Ōtohira fell into alcoholism, however, which affected his performance and he was never promoted.

In January 1896, he and Ōzutsu became the representative of the wrestlers calling for a boycott of the New Year tournament to protest the actions of Takasago Uragorō during the Nakamurarō jiken (中村楼事件), the 'Nakamurarō incident', during which all the wrestlers who were not members of the Takasago clan voiced their displeasure at the illegal actions of the master of the eponymous stable, who regularly went beyond the scope of his duties in order to gain influence within the Sumo Association. After the incident, Ōtohira continued to achieve mixed results allowing him to maintain his rank without earning promotion to yokozuna. Eventually, he was demoted to the rank of sekiwake for the May 1897 tournament, and retired after the January 1899 tournament.

== Retirement from sumo ==
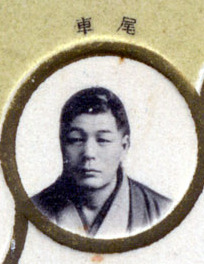
Ōtohira in 1909 on a commemorative postcard depicting the first Ryōgoku Kokugikan.

Since his master Katsuyama died in November of the same year, he succeeded him at the head of his stable, becoming the third-generation Oguruma. Because of the great respect he had for his master, he financed his tomb in his hometown of Tottori, Tottori Prefecture. The monument bears the engraved names of Katsuyama's most successful students: Ōtohira, Ōzutsu and Araiwa. After his retirement, Ōtohira quickly gained influence, assisting Ikazuchi (former yokozuna Umegatani I) in his duties as executive of the association and closely training Ōzutsu and Araiwa.

In March 1906, along with Ikazuchi, he was appointed by the association to sit on the construction committee to build the first Ryōgoku Kokugikan, since tournaments, at the time held in the Ekōin temple, were becoming less and less practical. Originally set to be called Shobukan (lit. Home of Martial Arts) by the founding committee chairman Itagaki Taisuke, the building took the name of Kokugikan (lit. National Sports Hall) thanks to Ōtohira who backed the decision of another member of the committee, writer Suiin Emi. Thanks to his decision to support Emi's name, Ōtohira was later known as the godfather of the Kokugikan.

Ōtohira died on 13 March 1916 at the age of 49. His grave is located in the premises of the Kofukuji temple, in Mukōjima (now Sumida, Tokyo).

== Career record ==
Ōtohira Hirokichi
-	Spring	Summer
1890	Unknown	East Jūryō #10; 6–3
1891	East Jūryō #4; 8–0	West Maegashira #7; 4–2–4
1892	West Maegashira #4; 7–1–2; Unofficial	West Sekiwake #1; 6–1–1; 2h
1893	West Ōzeki #1; 8–0–1; 1h Unofficial	West Ōzeki #1; 4–4–2
1894	West Ōzeki #1; 0–0–10	West Ōzeki #1; 6–2–1; 1d
1895	West Ōzeki #1; 0–0–10	West Haridashi Ōzeki; 4–1–5
1896	West Ōzeki #1; 6–3–1	West Ōzeki #1; 0–0–10
1897	West Ōzeki #1; 5–3–2	West Haridashi Sekiwake; 4–4–1; 1d
1898	West Maegashira #1; 5–2–2; 1d	West Komusubi #1; 0–0–10
1899	East Maegashira #3; Retired; 0–0–10	x
Record given as win-loss-absent Top Division Champion Retired Lower Divisions Key: d=Draw(s) (引分); h=Hold(s) (預り); nr=no result recorded Divisions: Makuuchi — Jūryō — Makushita — Sandanme — Jonidan — Jonokuchi Makuuchi ranks: Yokozuna (not ranked as such on banzuke until 1890); Ōzeki — Sekiwake — Komusubi — Maegashira

*Championships for the best record in a tournament were not recognized or awarded before the 1909 summer tournament and the above championships that are labelled "unofficial" are historically conferred. For more information see yūshō.

== See also ==
- Glossary of sumo terms
- List of past sumo wrestlers
- List of ōzeki
