= Koyanagi Tsunekichi =

Japanese sumo wrestler

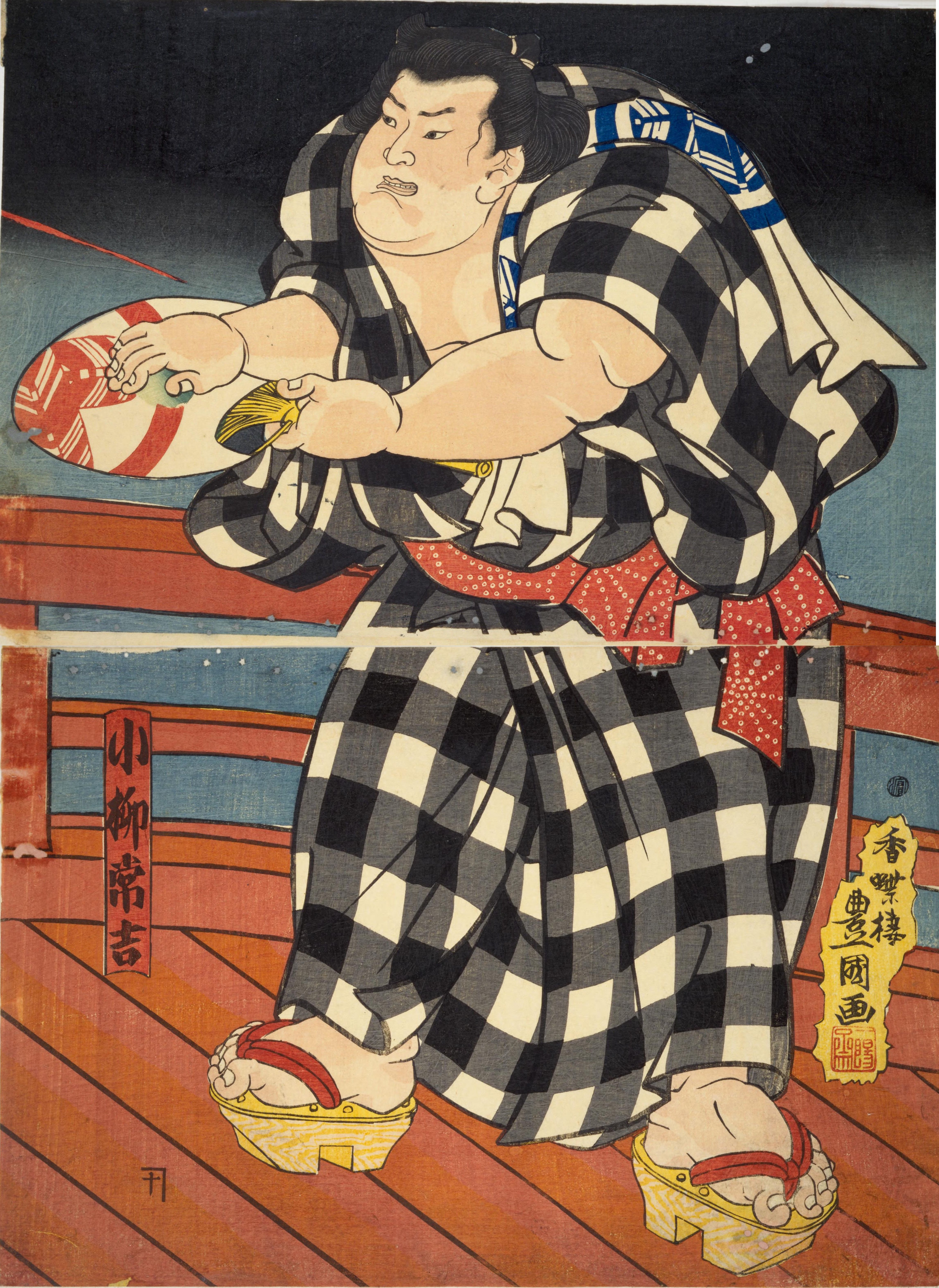

Personal information
- Native name: 小柳 常吉
- Born: Keiji Takaishi; August, 1817 Ichihara District, Kazusa Province, Japan
- Died: March 23, 1858 (aged 40)
- Height: 1.70 m (5 ft 7 in)
- Weight: 155 kg (342 lb)

Sport
- Sport: Sumo
- Retired: January 1856
- Heya: Ōnomatsu
- Record: 153–67–90–30 draws/6 holds
- Debut: January, 1835
- Highest rank: Ōzeki (November, 1852)
- Elder name: Ōnomatsu
- Championships: 5 (Makuuchi, unofficial)
- Updated on October 2023

Koyanagi Tsunekichi (Japanese: 小柳 常吉; born Keiji Takaishi (高石 桂治, Takaishi Keiji), August 1817 – March 23, 1858) was a Japanese sumo wrestler from Ichihara District, Kazusa Province (now Ichihara, Chiba Prefecture). His highest rank was ōzeki. He is the third wrestler from Chiba Prefecture to have been promoted to this rank and the first since Kimenzan Yoichiemon in 1813, 39 years earlier.

== Career ==
Little is known of Koyanagi's past before he became a wrestler. In 1827 he became apprentice to the then-ōzeki Ōnomatsu in Edo. He was initially given the shikona, or ring name, Midorimatsu (緑松) but changed it in 1837 to inherit his final name of Koyanagi (小柳), which had previously been borne by his master. Before being promoted to the makuuchi division, he was an inconsistent wrestler and regularly received promotions despite his results, thanks to his master's influence within the Sumo Association, and thanks to his obese physique, which raised expectations that he would one day become a dominant competitor despite his poor results at the time. His techniques improved, however, and between 1843 and 1850 he won the equivalent of five championships. However, as the yūshō system was not introduced until 1909, these championship victories are now considered unofficial. In 1843, he obtained the patronage of the Tokushima Domain, but the latter did not renew its protection for the following years, leaving Koyanagi without an influential protector for the rest of his career.

In 1845, he made his debut in the san'yaku ranks with a promotion to komusubi. Nevertheless, he stagnated in the lower ranks of san'yaku for five years, as the top of the rankings at the time was occupied by consistent and successful wrestlers such as Tsurugizan and Kagamiiwa. In 1850, however, he was promoted to sekiwake and won the equivalent of his last championship in his inaugural tournament at that rank. In 1852 he reached the rank of ōzeki. That same year, his master died and Koyanagi led the stable as its highest-ranked wrestler. For more than three years, he held his position. In 1854, Western ships arrived at Uraga, Kanagawa and Koyanagi was sent with the Japanese delegation to welcome Commander Matthew C. Perry, wrestling with sailors in an exhibition tournament. As a result, Perry mentions him in his memoirs as "massive because his frame was covered with a mass of flesh". Koyanagi was also involved in the first recorded boxing matches of Japan, being ordered to fight a boxer and a wrestler from the United States who accompanied Perry. There were three fought matches, using different martial arts' styles, before Perry and other spectators. Koyanagi reportedly won.

In 1856, he retired as a wrestler and became an elder under the name Ōnomatsu, succeeding his master as the second generation of this name. Koyanagi died on March 23, 1858. His tomb is located in the Gyokusen-in temple of Kōtō, Tokyo, where wrestlers who used the Ōnomatsu name are buried (from the first to the fourth).

In July 2021, the Ichihara, Chiba museum presented a collection of objects linked to Koyanagi, including clay menko in his effigy.

== Top division record ==
- The actual time the tournaments were held during the year in this period often varied.

Koyanagi Tsunekichi
-	Spring	Summer
1837	Unknown	East Jūryō #6; 6–4
1838	East Jūryō #7; 0–3; 1d	East Jūryō #6; 4–6
1839	East Jūryō #5; 6–3; 1d	East Jūryō #1; 6–4
1840	East Maegashira #6; 4–5–1	East Maegashira #3; 3–4–3
1841	West Maegashira #2; 2–1–2; 5h	West Maegashira #2; 4–1–3
1842	East Maegashira #2; 4–2–1; 2d	East Maegashira #2; 4–2–4
1843	East Maegashira #2; 6–1–2; 1d	East Maegashira #2; 7–0–2; 1d Unofficial
1844	East Maegashira #1; 1–0–9	East Maegashira #1; 6–3–1
1845	East Maegashira #1; 5–1–3; 1d	East Komusubi #1; 6–1–3
1846	East Komusubi #1; 0–0–10	East Komusubi #1; 4–0–5; 1h
1847	East Komusubi #1; 6–1–2; 1d Unofficial	East Komusubi #1; 8–1–1; Unofficial
1848	East Komusubi #1; 4–3–1; 2d	East Komusubi #1; 7–1–1; 2d Unofficial
1849	East Komusubi #1; 5–0–5	East Komusubi #1; 6–1–2; 1d
1850	East Sekiwake #1; 6–0–2; 2d Unofficial	East Sekiwake #1; 4–2–2; 2d
1851	East Sekiwake #1; 2–1–1; 1d	East Sekiwake #1; 4–1–1; 4d
1852	East Sekiwake #1; 3–2–2; 3d	East Ōzeki #1; 5–2–1; 2d
1853	East Ōzeki #1; 5–3–1; 1d	East Ōzeki #1; 5–1–2; 2d
1854	East Ōzeki #1; 3–3–4	East Ōzeki #1; 2–4–3; 1d
1855	East Ōzeki #1; 0–0–10	Unknown
1856	East Ōzeki #1; Retired; 0–0–10	x
Record given as win-loss-absent Top Division Champion Top Division Runner-up Retired Lower Divisions Key:d=Draw(s) (引分); h=Hold(s) (預り); Divisions: Makuuchi — Jūryō — Makushita — Sandanme — Jonidan — Jonokuchi Makuuchi ranks: Yokozuna — Ōzeki — Sekiwake — Komusubi — Maegashira

*Championships for the best record in a tournament were not recognized or awarded before the 1909 summer tournament and the above championships that are labelled "unofficial" are historically conferred. For more information see yūshō.

== See also ==
- Glossary of sumo terms
- List of past sumo wrestlers
- List of ōzeki
