= Isenohama Keitarō =

Japanese sumo wrestler

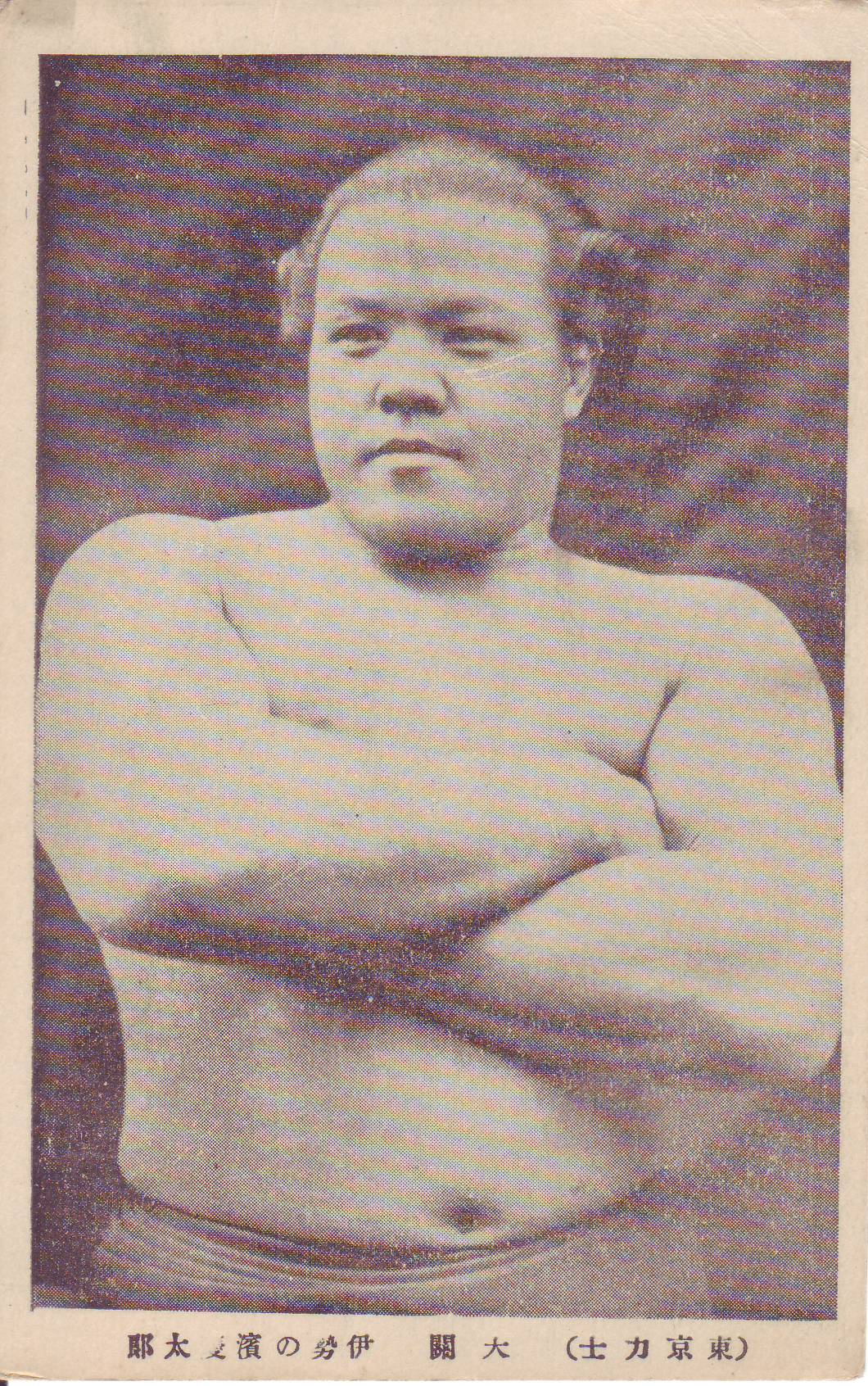

Personal information
- Native name: 伊勢ノ濱 慶太郎
- Born: Keitarō Nakadashi; November 9, 1883 Honjo Ward, Sumida, Tokyo, Japan
- Died: May 17, 1928 (aged 44)
- Height: 1.68 m (5 ft 6 in)
- Weight: 105 kg (231 lb; 16.5 st)

Sport
- Sport: Sumo
- Retired: January 1919
- Heya: Negishi → Tomozuna
- Record: 112-85-58-9 draws/16 holds
- Debut: January 1902
- Highest rank: Ōzeki (January 1914)
- Elder name: Nakadachi
- Gold Stars: 1 (Hitachiyama)
- Updated on 11 August 2023

Isenohama Keitarō (Japanese: 伊勢ノ濱慶太郎; born Keitarō Nakadashi (中立 慶太郎), November 9, 1883 – May 17, 1928) was a Japanese professional sumo wrestler from Honjo, Sumida, Tokyo.

== History ==
Isenohama was born into a sumo family, his father was Isenohama Ogiemon (伊勢ノ濱荻右エ門), a former maegashira professional wrestler (rikishi) who was active in the mid-Meiji era (1880s) in the old Ikazuchi stable. His grandfather was the 9th generation Kimura Shōtarō, a san'yaku gyōji and his cousin was Negishi Jiemon, an elder in the Sumo Association and master of the eponymous stable. He was an apprentice in a sake shop in Nihonbashi, but is said to have shown the same strength as his father, and at the age of 18 he decided to join the stable of his cousin Negishi, making his first appearance in the ring in the January 1902 tournament. There, he inherited his father's shikona, or ring name. However, as Negishi's stable did not have a ring, he went to the prestigious Tomozuna stable, where he was trained by future-yokozuna Tachiyama and future-ōzeki Kunimiyama. He rose quickly through the ranks, being promoted to jūryō in the May 1905 tournament, and became a makuuchi wrestler at the May 1906 tournament.

However, after a rapid rise to the top division of sumo, his performances stagnated for a while. Because he lost only six times since his sekitori debut, he became prideful and neglected his sumo. In January 1907, he deserted the tournament and cut his top-knot, but he was persuaded by those around him to change his ways and concentrate on the ring. He returned for the May tournament where he surprised everyone because he wrestled with a close-cropped haircut. Since then, he seemed to have changed his mind, and after that he practised hard. It is said that at the time he gave up drinking and smoking to devote himself even more to the sport. He continued to perform well at the top ranks, including scoring an upset victory against Yokozuna Hitachiyama during the February 1911 tournament. However, this was Isenohama's only victory over the grand-yokozuna in five matches (1909-1913). In January 1914, he was promoted to ōzeki after he scored a 9–1 record as sekiwake; taking second place just behind the tournament winner, Yokozuna Tachiyama. Isenohama held the rank of ōzeki for over five years and, since he often trained at Tomozuna stable, he eventually decided to join that stable.

In his later years he suffered from neuralgia and rheumatism and retired after the January 1919 tournament, taking the Nakadachi elder share. He founded the eponymous stable, which achieved some success with the temporary closure of Tomozuna stable, reclaiming its staff until May 1921, when Komusubi Yahazuyama reopened the stable under a double-license system. After retiring, he raised future-maegashira Nadanohana and served as a director and shimpan of the Sumo Association, and was well-liked for his intelligent and mild-mannered character. On May 17, 1928, he committed suicide by taking poison at a Japanese inn where he was staying in Numazu, Shizuoka Prefecture. His stable closed and his disciples were entrusted to the Futagoyama stable and later transferred to Dewanoumi stable. Because of this, the Nakadashi elder share is now part of the Dewanoumi ichimon although originally part of the Tatsunami-Isegahama ichimon. His tomb is in the family vault at Hompō-ji temple, in the special district of Taitō, Tokyo.

His hobby was writing novels, which were published in magazines. He is said to have always carried manuscript papers in his kimono as well. He had his wife run the sumo teahouse Mikawaya, currently the tenth Sumo Information Centre at the Ryōgoku Kokugikan's annaijo entrance.

== Fighting style ==
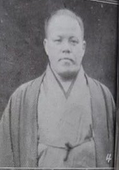
Isenohama as Nakadachi-oyakata in May 1925

He was short and light, but he was known for muscular body. Both he and his father were known for their monstrous strength, and there is a legend that they were able to spin a large bronze bell from Narita-san Temple with one hand. His preferred grip was hidari-yotsu, a right hand outside, left hand inside position. Known for his uwatenage, he surprised spectators by winning over Ōzeki Komagatake and Yokozuna Nishinoumi II with clean swings.

== Top Division Record ==
Isenohama Keitarō
-	Spring	Summer
1905	x	East Jūryō #9; 7–2; 1h
1906	West Jūryō #2; 7–1; 2h	East Maegashira #7; 1–3–5; 1h
1907	East Maegashira #6; 0–0–10	East Maegashira #14; 2–4–1; 1d-1h
1908	East Maegashira #7; 2–4–2; 1d-1h	East Maegashira #6; 2–5–1; 1d-1h
1909	West Maegashira #2; 3–3–2; 1d-1h	West Komusubi #1; 5–5
1910	West Komusubi #1; 7–3	West Sekiwake #1; 5–5
1911	West Maegashira #1; 5–4–1 ★	West Sekiwake #1; 4–4–1; 1h
1912	East Maegashira #1; 5–3; 1h-1d	West Maegashira #1; 6–3; 1h
1913	West Sekiwake #1; 6–3; 1h	West Haridashi Sekiwake; 9–1
1914	East Haridashi Ōzeki; 5–4; 1h	West Haridashi Ōzeki; 6–2; 1h-1d
1915	West Haridashi Ōzeki; 1–3–4; 2d	West Ōzeki #1; 4–6
1916	West Haridashi Ōzeki; 2–0–8	West Ōzeki #1; 2–6–1; 1h
1917	East Haridashi Ōzeki; 6–3–1	East Ōzeki #1; 5–5
1918	West Haridashi Ōzeki; 5–4–1	West Haridashi Ōzeki; 0–0–10
1919	West Haridashi Ōzeki; Retired; 0–0	
Record given as win-loss-absent Top Division Champion Top Division Runner-up Retired Lower Divisions Key: ★=Kinboshi(s); d=Draw(s) (引分); h=Hold(s) (預り); Divisions: Makuuchi — Jūryō — Makushita — Sandanme — Jonidan — Jonokuchi Makuuchi ranks: Yokozuna — Ōzeki — Sekiwake — Komusubi — Maegashira

== See also ==
- Glossary of sumo terms
- List of past sumo wrestlers
- List of ōzeki

== Sources ==
=== Further reading ===
- Seiichi, Funahashi (1943). Sumō ki. Sôgen-sha.
