= Tsushimanada Yakichi =

Japanese sumo wrestler (1887–1933)

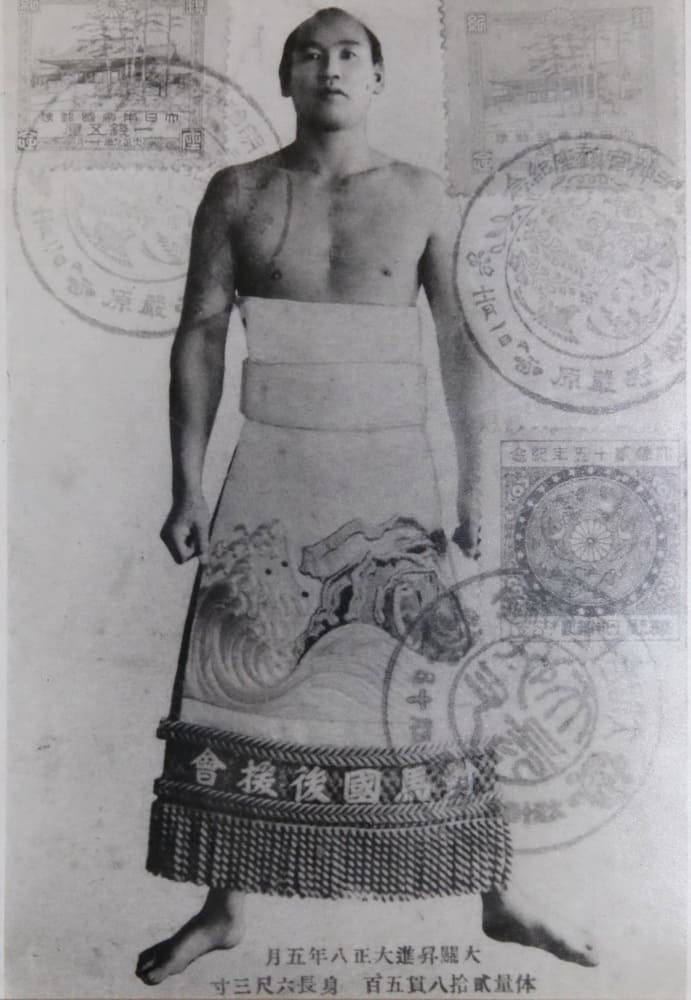
- Tsushimanada in a 1919 postcard commemorating his promotion to Ōzeki

Personal information
- Native name: 對馬洋 弥吉
- Born: Yakichi Kawakami; August 19, 1887 Tsushima, Nagasaki Prefecture; Japan
- Died: February 16, 1933 (aged 45) Tsushima Island, Japan
- Height: 1.90 m (6 ft 3 in)
- Weight: 105 kg (231 lb; 16.5 st)

Sport
- Sport: Sumo
- Retired: May 1922
- Heya: Dewanoumi
- Debut: January 1910
- Highest rank: Ōzeki (May 1919)
- Championships: 1 (Sandanme); 1 (Jonokuchi)
- Updated on October 6, 2022

Tsushimanada Yakichi (Japanese: 對馬洋 弥吉; born Yakichi Kawakami (弥吉 川上), August 19, 1887 – February 16, 1933) was a Japanese professional sumo wrestler from Tsushima in the Nagasaki Prefecture. As of May 1962, he is one of six wrestlers in that prefecture to have reached or surpassed the rank of ōzeki, and the first to have achieved this feat since the fourth Tamagaki Gakunosuke, 107 years earlier.

== History ==
Yakichi Kawakami enlisted in the Tsushima Fortress Artillery Battalion, at the age of 20, for military service. However, the division commander at the time recommended that he become a sumo wrestler because of his good physique, so he was discharged and joined the Dewanoumi stable in 1908. Yakichi chose Tsushimanada as his ring name, or shikona, to pay homage to his home island. In his stable, he became the protege of yokozuna Hitachiyama. His first tournament was delayed until 1910 as he suffered from thiamine deficiency. At the age of 25, he was promoted from makushita to jūryō. In 1915, he entered the top division, where he was the tallest wrestler at the time. During his makuuchi years, he dislocated his shoulder after a bout against yokozuna Ōtori. He was however promoted to ōzeki the following tournament, at the age of 31. At the time of his promotion, a banquet was held at the invitation of Nakarai Tōsui, a famous writer from Tsushima. Tsushimanada, however, did not kept his rank after he injured his left arm during training. He retired in 1922, at the age of 34, and did not remained in his stable as an elder.
Upon coming back to Tsushima, he became the mayor of his village.

In 2017, Sakaigawa stable wrestler Masamitsu Umeno, whose family is from Tsushima, was given the Tsushimanada shikona, or ring name, because he comes from a family originally from the island of Tsushima, and being himself from Nagasaki Prefecture.

In 2018, his 1919's keshō-mawashi was retrieved in the Nagasaki Prefectural Tsushima High School as part of the city's survey of cultural assets. The keshō-mawashi was decorated with light blue waves and golden rocky mountains, portraying a classical Tsushima landscape. The lining is decorated with red brocade such as dragons and phoenixes.

== Top Division Record ==
Tsushimanada
-	Spring	Summer
1910	(Maezumo)	West Jonokuchi #22; 5–0; Champion
1911	Unknown	Unknown
1912	West Sandanme #6; 5–0; Champion	Unknown
1913	Unknown	East Jūryō #3; 5–2; 1d
1914	West Maegashira #14; 1–6; 3h	West Jūryō #1; 4–1; 1h
1915	East Maegashira #15; 8–2	East Maegashira #1; 5–3; 2d
1916	East Sekiwake #1; 6–3–1	East Sekiwake #1; 5–3; 2h
1917	West Haridashi Sekiwake; 0–2–8	West Maegashira #3; 5–4; 1h
1918	East Maegashira #1; 5–2–3	East Komusubi #1; 6–2; 2h
1919	East Haridashi Sekiwake; 6–1; 3h	East Ōzeki #1; 6–4
1920	East Ōzeki #1; 4–6	West Sekiwake #1; 0–0–10
1921	West Komusubi #1; 4–6	East Maegashira #5; 1–2–7
1922	East Maegashira #9; 0–0–10	West Maegashira #14; Retired; 0–0–10
Record given as win-loss-absent Top Division Champion Top Division Runner-up Retired Lower Divisions Key:d=Draw(s) (引分); h=Hold(s) (預り); Divisions: Makuuchi — Jūryō — Makushita — Sandanme — Jonidan — Jonokuchi Makuuchi ranks: Yokozuna — Ōzeki — Sekiwake — Komusubi — Maegashira

== See also ==
- Glossary of sumo terms
- List of past sumo wrestlers
- List of ōzeki
