= Kotōzan Bun'emon =

Japanese sumo wrestler

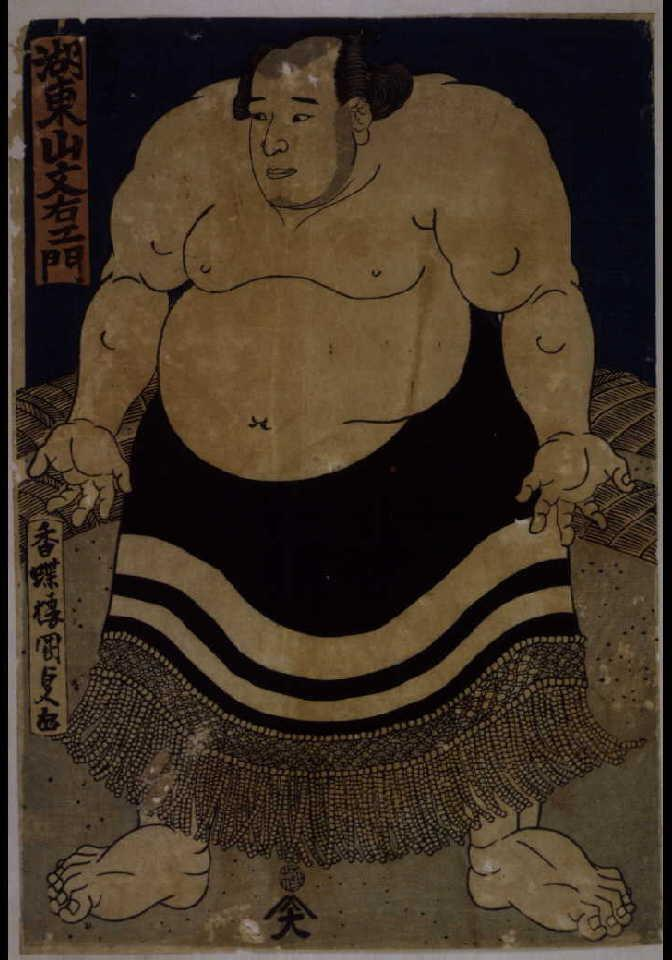

Personal information
- Native name: 湖東山 文右エ門
- Born: Yasaburō Yasumura; 1798 Kanzaki District, Ōmi Province, Japan
- Died: June 25, 1858 (aged 59–60)

Sport
- Sport: Sumo
- Retired: March, 1845
- Heya: Takekuma → Ōnomatsu
- Record: 145-62-89-20 draws/13 holds
- Debut: October, 1824
- Highest rank: Ōzeki (February, 1836)
- Elder name: Takekuma
- Championships: 2 (Makuuchi, unofficial)
- Updated on October 2023

Kotōzan Bun'emon (Japanese: 湖東山 文右エ門; born Yasaburō Yasumura (安村 弥三郎, Yasumura Yasaburō), 1798 – June 25, 1858) was a Japanese professional sumo wrestler from Kanzaki District, Ōmi Province (now Higashiōmi, Shiga Prefecture). His highest rank was ōzeki. He is the second wrestler from Shiga Prefecture to have been promoted to this rank, having been promoted after Onogawa in 1790, 46 years earlier. As of February 1836, he is also the last wrestler from that prefecture to have achieved this feat.

== Career ==
Kotōzan was born in Yōkaichi, Shiga, a town that has since ceased to exist. He began his wrestling career in the Kyoto-based sumo association but later transferred to the Edo-based association. There, he was recruited in the Takekuma stable, under the tutelage of Takekuma Bunzō (武隈 文藏), hence being stablemate with Ōnomatsu Midorinosuke. Later he acquired the patronage of the Chōshū Domain. In 1827, he was given the shikona, or ring name, Koyanagi Harugorō (小柳 春五郎) and made his makuuchi debut in October 1829. In 1834, he achieved the equivalent of a championship victory by winning 8 times and going undefeated. For his performance he was promoted directly to the rank of sekiwake.

After two tournaments at this rank he was promoted to ōzeki as Ōnomatsu had retired the previous year, leaving the rankings unbalanced for the first tournament of the year. After his promotion he served the Himeji Domain under his new shikona: Tegarayama Shigeemon (手柄山 繁右エ門). After a poor performance in October 1838, he was demoted from his rank but regained it for the following tournament. He remained ozeki for 10 tournaments, giving the image of a stable, solid wrestler, rarely losing to lower-ranked wrestlers but failing to shine against higher-ranked wrestlers either. In 1841 he was permanently stripped of the rank of ōzeki, ending his career as a sekiwake and taking his definitive shikona of Kotōzan. In 1842 he won his last tournament. However, as the yūshō system was not introduced until 1909, his two championship victories are now considered unofficial.

In 1843 he became an elder within the association under the name of Takekuma, teaching young wrestlers within his own stable while continuing to wrestle under the two-licence system. He retired as a wrestler in March 1845, later devoting himself entirely to training his pupils. As a coach, he raised yokozuna Kimenzan. After the death of Ōnomatsu, Kotōzan participated in the erection of a monument honoring him in the Ryūzō-ji temple of Kanazawa. Kotōzan died on 25 June 1858.

== Top division record ==
- The actual time the tournaments were held during the year in this period often varied.

Kotōzan Bun'emon
-	Spring	Winter
1827	East Jūryō #5; 5–1	East Jūryō #2; 4–2
1828	East Jūryō #1; 7–2	East Jūryō #2; 6–2; 1d
1829	East Jūryō #1; 3–3	East Maegashira #6; 4–3–1; 1h
1830	East Maegashira #6; 2–2–6	East Maegashira #6; 6–0–2; 1d-1h
1831	East Maegashira #4; 3–3–3; 1h	East Maegashira #4; 2–2–3; 1d
1832	East Maegashira #3; 3–6–1	Unknown
1833	East Maegashira #2; 5–2–1; 2d	East Maegashira #2; 5–1–1; 1h
1834	East Maegashira #2; 8–0–1; 1d Unofficial	East Sekiwake #1; 5–0–3; 2d
1835	East Sekiwake #1; 3–1–4; 1d-1h	East Sekiwake #1; 4–3–2; 1d
1836	East Ōzeki #1; 3–0–2; 1d	East Ōzeki #2; 6–1–2; 1d
1837	East Ōzeki #1; 3–1–6	East Ōzeki #1; 4–2–1; 2d-1h
1838	East Ōzeki #1; 2–1–3	East Ōzeki #1; 2–4–2; 2d
1839	Sat out	East Ōzeki #1; 4–1–3; 1d-1h
1840	East Sekiwake #1; 7–2–1	East Ōzeki #1; 5–0–2; 1d-1h
1841	East Ōzeki #1; 4–2–3; 1h	East Ōzeki #1; 6–1
1842	East Sekiwake #1; 7–0–2; 1d Unofficial	East Sekiwake #1; 4–4–1; 1d
1843	Sat out	East Sekiwake #1; 4–1–5
1844	East Sekiwake #1; 3–3–2; 2h	East Sekiwake #1; 4–2–3
1845	East Sekiwake #1; Retired; 2–4–3; 1h	x
Record given as win-loss-absent Top Division Champion Top Division Runner-up Retired Lower Divisions Key:d=Draw(s) (引分); h=Hold(s) (預り); Divisions: Makuuchi — Jūryō — Makushita — Sandanme — Jonidan — Jonokuchi Makuuchi ranks: Yokozuna — Ōzeki — Sekiwake — Komusubi — Maegashira

*Championships for the best record in a tournament were not recognized or awarded before the 1909 summer tournament and the above championships that are labelled "unofficial" are historically conferred. For more information see yūshō.

== See also ==
- Glossary of sumo terms
- List of past sumo wrestlers
- List of ōzeki
