= Kunimiyama Etsukichi =

Japanese sumo wrestler

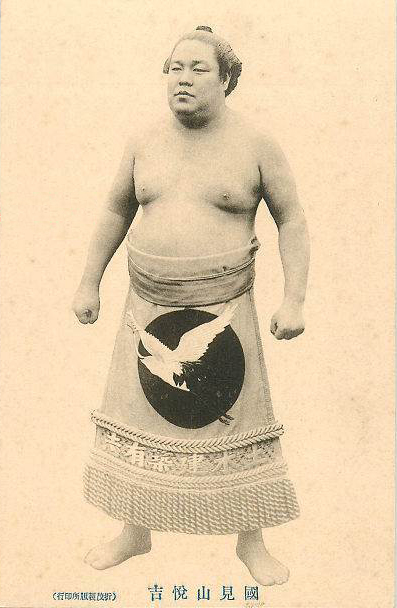

Personal information
- Native name: 國見山 悦吉
- Born: Etsukichi Matsushita; March 28, 1876 Tosa District, Kōchi, Japan
- Died: September 25, 1924 (aged 48)
- Height: 1.78 m (5 ft 10 in)
- Weight: 132 kg (291 lb; 20.8 st)

Sport
- Sport: Sumo
- Retired: May, 1912
- Heya: Tomozuna
- Record: 125-30-91-26 draws/5 holds
- Debut: June, 1895
- Highest rank: Ōzeki (May, 1905)
- Elder name: Hanaregoma
- Championships: 2 (Makuuchi, unofficial)
- Updated on 14 August 2023

Kunimiyama Etsukichi (Japanese: 國見山 悦吉; born Etsukichi Matsushita (松下 悦吉, Matsushita Etsukichi), March 28, 1876 – September 25, 1924) was a Japanese professional sumo wrestler from Tosa District, Kōchi (now Kōchi, Kōchi Prefecture). He reached the rank of ōzeki in May 1905 and was the first wrestler to be promoted at that rank since Yahatayama, 14 years earlier. He was also the last ōzeki from his prefecture until the promotion of Tamanishiki in May 1930, 25 years later.

== History ==
Kunimiyama worked at a coal mine in Ehime Prefecture on the same island as his original prefecture (Shikoku). There, he was spotted by Itagaki Taisuke, an influential politician and renowned sumo patron, due to his size and strength. Taisuke persuaded him to become a professional wrestler (rikishi) and he joined Tomozuna stable in January 1895, under former maegashira Kaizan, who was also from Kōchi Prefecture. He initially started to wrestle under the shikona, or ring name, Kagamigawa (鏡川) but later changed it to Kunimiyama (國見山) to evoke respectively both a river and a mountain in his home prefecture.

Kunimiyama was known for his large, well-proportioned physique, and was strong against smaller wrestlers and would rarely lose to lower-ranked wrestlers. He achieved san'yaku status for the 1902 tournaments, only three years after his debut in the makuuchi division. In his stable, he was joined and quickly outclassed by Tachiyama, even though the latter became a professional wrestler 5 years after Kunimiyama. Kunimiyama won his first tournament in 1903 with the rank of sekiwake. However, the yūshō system was not introduced until 1909, and his championships are today considered unofficial. His championship victory nevertheless resulted in his promotion to ōzeki, the second-highest rank in sumo. He was promoted along Araiwa for the 1905 summer tournament. Kunimiyama held this position for 7 years, notably winning a second tournament in 1907. In May 1908, he dislocated his knee, resulting in a growing number of draws. Nevertheless, during the June 1910 tournament, he ended second place just behind the tournament winner Tachiyama. During his career, many commentators speculated about Kunimiyama's possible promotion to the rank of yokozuna, but this promotion was definitively dropped due to his knee injury.

After retiring as a wrestler in June 1912, Kunimiyama remained in the Tokyo Sumo Association as an elder in his stable, assuming the name Hanaregoma. In November 1917, a fire broke out at the Ryōgoku Kokugikan and Hanaregoma, who was on guard duty at the time, tried to help extinguish the fire. Kunimiyama suffered severe burns and fell into a coma, being taken to a nearby hospital where he steadily recovered and was praised after his discharge.

== Legacy ==
The Kunimiyama shikona is considered a legacy in Tomozuna stable and within the Tastunami-Isegahama ichimon, or clan. Several wrestlers have inherited this shikona, notably in Isegahama stable. The last use of the Kunimiyama shikona was in May 1985, when Korean wrestler Ki-Ju Kim was given the ring name to help him build a comeback after falling from makushita to sandanme. Ki-Ju Kim was at the time the first Korean to enter professional sumo. Kunimiyama however retired in 1988, after five consecutive losing record caused by injuries.

== Top Division Record ==
Kunimiyama Etsukichi
-	Spring	Summer
1899	West Jūryō #8; 6–1; 1d	West Jūryō #2; 8–0; 1d
1900	West Maegashira #6; 3–4–1; 2d	West Maegashira #6; 0–1–9
1901	West Maegashira #7; 5–2–1; 1d-1h	East Maegashira #3; 7–2–1
1902	East Komusubi #1; 4–2–4	East Komusubi #1; 5–0–2; 2d-2h
1903	East Sekiwake #1; 8–1–1	East Sekiwake #1; 7–2–1
1904	East Sekiwake #1; 6–2–1; 1d	East Sekiwake #1; 4–1–4; 1d
1905	East Sekiwake #1; 9–0–1; Unofficial	East Ōzeki #1; 4–0–5; 1h
1906	East Ōzeki #1; 7–2–1	East Ōzeki #1; 5–0–4; 1d
1907	East Ōzeki #1; 6–1–3; Unofficial	East Ōzeki #1; 4–2–2; 1d-1h
1908	East Ōzeki #1; 6–1–1; 2d	East Ōzeki #1; 2–1–7
1909	West Ōzeki #1; 0–0–10	East Haridashi Ōzeki; 3–2; 5d
1910	East Haridashi Ōzeki; 2–0–4; 4d	East Haridashi Ōzeki; 7–1; 2d
1911	East Haridashi Ōzeki; 2–0–8	West Ōzeki #1; 0–0–10
1912	East Ōzeki #1; 5–2; 2d-1h	West Ōzeki #1; Retired; 0–0–10
Record given as win-loss-absent Top Division Champion Top Division Runner-up Retired Lower Divisions Key:d=Draw(s) (引分); h=Hold(s) (預り); Divisions: Makuuchi — Jūryō — Makushita — Sandanme — Jonidan — Jonokuchi Makuuchi ranks: Yokozuna — Ōzeki — Sekiwake — Komusubi — Maegashira

*Championships for the best record in a tournament were not recognized or awarded before the 1909 summer tournament and the above championships that are labelled "unofficial" are historically conferred. For more information see yūshō.

== See also ==
- Glossary of sumo terms
- List of past sumo wrestlers
- List of ōzeki
