= Suiin Emi =

Japanese Novelist and Journalist

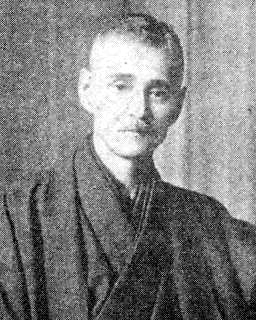
- Suiin Emi.
- Born: Tadanori Emi; 17 September 1869; Okayama, Japan
- Died: 3 November 1934 (aged 65); Matsuyama, Japan
- Occupations: Novelist, journalist
- Writing career
- Genres: Novels, short stories
- Notable works: Nyōbō-goroshi; Chitei Tanken-ki

Suiin Emi (江見 水蔭, Emi Suiin; 17 September 1869 – 3 November 1934), born Tadanori Emi (江見 忠功, Emi Tadanori), was a Japanese novelist and journalist.

Born in Okayama into a shizoku (former samurai) family, he travelled to Tokyo to join the army but instead joined the Kenyūsha literary society and quickly became celebrated during the Sino-Japanese War for his patriotic stories in the newspaper Chūō Shinbun.

A pillar of the Meiji-era literary establishment, and the editor of Kobe Shinbun and Taiheiyo as well as Senshibankō and Kozakuraodoshi, his writing is marred for modern readers by its imperialist outlook, one example being Osero, a new version of Othello commissioned for the Otojiro Kawakami troupe and set in the Taiwan of 1903, in which the Othello figure, the governor Lt. Gen. Muro Washirō, is a Japanese burakumin who has been sent to the island to suppress a rebellion.

He was the first to refer to sumo as the national sport (kokugi), inspiring the name of the Ryōgoku Kokugikan stadium built in 1909. He died in Matsuyama.

== Bibliography ==
- Kenneth G. Henshall (ed.), Tayama Katai. Literary life in Tōkyō, 1885-1915: Tayama Katai's memoirs "Thirty years in Tōkyō." Brill Archive, 1987.
- Indra A. Levy. Sirens of the Western shore: the westernesque femme fatale, translation, and vernacular style in modern Japanese literature. Columbia University Press, 2006.
