= Kashiwado Risuke =

Japanese sumo wrestler

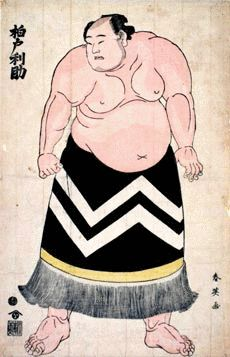

Personal information
- Native name: 柏戸 利助
- Born: Kawanami; 1783 Goshogawara, Aomori, Japan
- Died: December 3, 1828 (aged 45)
- Height: 1.83 m (6 ft 0 in)
- Weight: 132 kg (291 lb)

Sport
- Sport: Sumo
- Retired: January 1825
- Heya: Isenoumi
- Record: 158-37-53; 7draws-5holds-16noresults (Makuuchi)
- Debut: October 1806
- Highest rank: Ōzeki (March 1815)
- Championships: 16 (Makuuchi, unofficial)
- Updated on May 2008

Kashiwado Risuke (柏戸 利助, 1783 – December 3, 1828) was a sumo wrestler from Goshogawara, Aomori, Japan.

== Career ==
Kashiwado was born in Aomori and went to Edo in 1806, joining Isenoumi stable. He was given the name Kashiwado and worked under the Hirosaki Domain. His highest rank was ōzeki. He won 16 tournaments in the top makuuchi division, but his top division win ratio was not so high at .810, compared with Tanikaze (.949) and Onogawa (.917).

In June 1823, the Gojo family granted yokozuna licences to Kashiwado and his rival Tamagaki, but he rejected his. The reason has been said to be that he was afraid that this would cause conflict with the Yoshida family. Tamagaki also rejected the licence. The following year Tamagaki suddenly died, and his death shocked Kashiwado. In January 1825, Kashiwado lost three consecutive bouts and retired.

Kashiwado was not promoted to yokozuna but because 20th Yoshida Oikaze had heard of his case, he decided to issue a license to Ōnomatsu Midorinosuke in 1828, making Ōnomatsu the first yokozuna in 39 years.

== Top division record ==
- The actual time the tournaments were held during the year in this period often varied.

Kashiwado
-	Spring	Winter
1811	East Maegashira #8; 5–1; 1d 1h 2nr	East Maegashira #7; 3–2–4; 1nr
1812	East Maegashira #6; 4–0; 1d	East Maegashira #4; 7–2; 1d Unofficial
1813	East Maegashira #1; 7–1; 1d 1nr Unofficial	West Maegashira #1; 7–1; 2 nr Unofficial
1814	West Maegashira #2; 7–1; 1d 1nr Unofficial	East Sekiwake #1; 7–1; 1d 1h
1815	East Ōzeki #1; 7–1–1; 1nr Unofficial	East Ōzeki #1; 6–1–3; Unofficial
1816	East Ōzeki #1; 7–1; Unofficial	East Ōzeki #1; 9–0; 1nr Unofficial
1817	East Ōzeki #1; 6–2–2	East Ōzeki #1; 6–1–2; 1h Unofficial
1818	East Ōzeki #1; 6–1–2; 1h	East Ōzeki #1; 7–1–1; 1nr Unofficial
1819	East Ōzeki #1; 5–1–2; 2nr Unofficial	East Ōzeki #1; 7–1–2; Unofficial
1820	East Ōzeki #1; 4–0; 1d 1nr Unofficial	East Ōzeki #1; 6–1–2; 1nr
1821	East Ōzeki #1; 6–2–2	East Ōzeki #1; 8–2; Unofficial
1822	East Ōzeki #1; 7–2–1; Unofficial	East Ōzeki #1; 6–2–1; 1nr Unofficial
1823	East Ōzeki #1; 1–1–5	East Ōzeki #1; 5–3–1; 1nr
1824	Sat out	East Ōzeki #1; 2–2–3; 1d 1h 1nr
1825	East Ōzeki #1; Retired; 0–3–7	x
Record given as win-loss-absent Top Division Champion Retired Lower Divisions Key: d=Draw(s) (引分); h=Hold(s) (預り); nr=no result recorded Divisions: Makuuchi — Jūryō — Makushita — Sandanme — Jonidan — Jonokuchi Makuuchi ranks: Yokozuna (not ranked as such on banzuke until 1890); Ōzeki — Sekiwake — Komusubi — Maegashira

*Championships for the best record in a tournament were not recognized or awarded before the 1909 summer tournament, and the unofficial championships above are historically conferred. For more information, see yūshō.

== See also ==
- List of past sumo wrestlers
- Glossary of sumo terms
