= Honjo, Tokyo =

Coordinates: 35°42′13″N 139°48′04″E

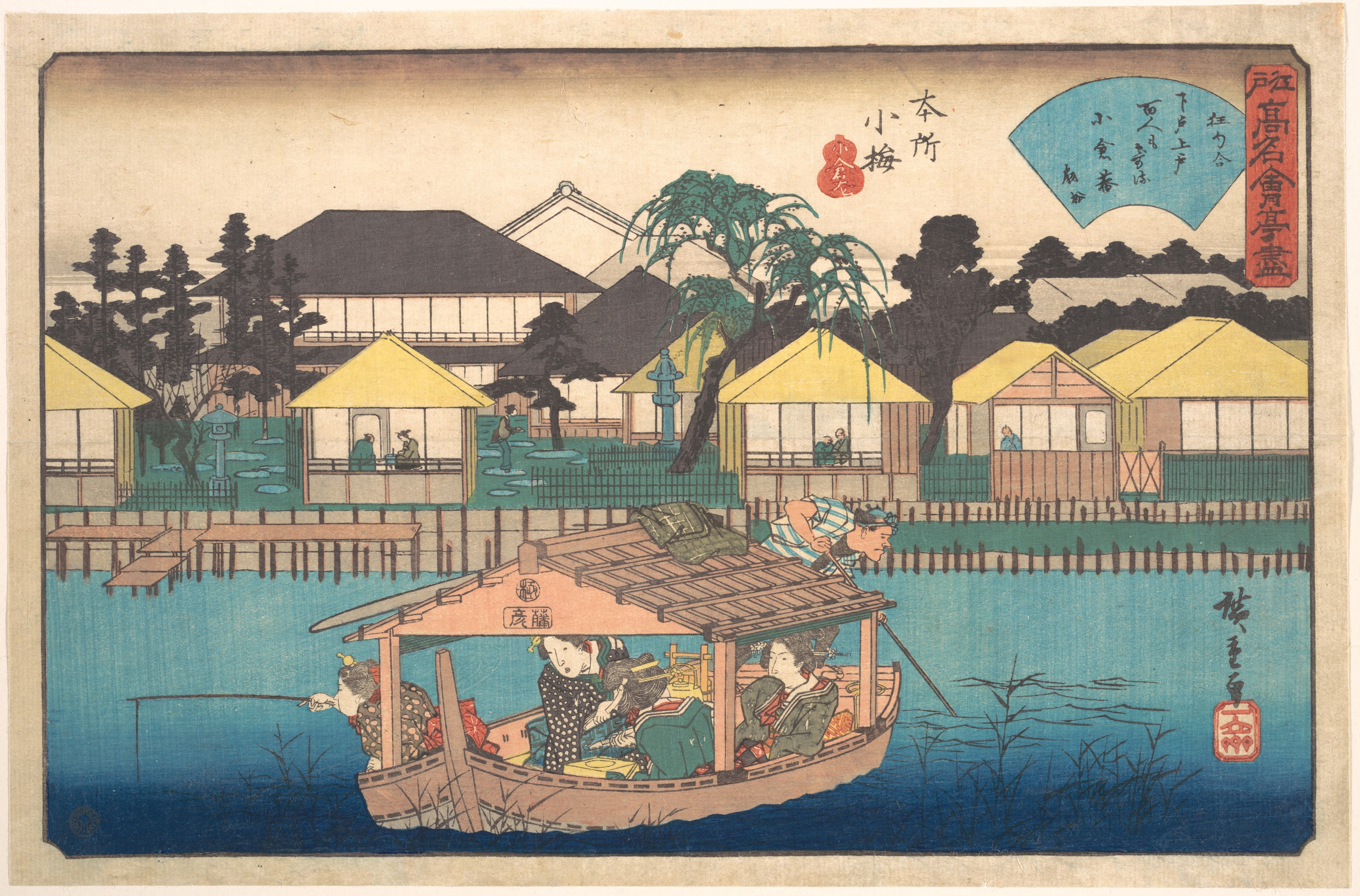
Honjo Komme (Ogura-an)

Honjo (本所) is the name of a neighborhood in Sumida, Tokyo, and a former ward (本所区, Honjo-ku) in the now-defunct Tokyo City. In 1947, when the 35 wards of Tokyo were reorganized into 23, it was merged with the suburban Mukojima ward to form the modern Sumida ward.

== Geography ==
As a ward, the Sumida River divided Honjo from the centre of the city.

== History ==
The name Honjo may be a remnant of the shōen system from the Kyōhō period. In the 17th century, Honjo was linked to the rest of Edo by the Ryōgoku Bridge that spanned the Sumida River.

=== As a ward ===
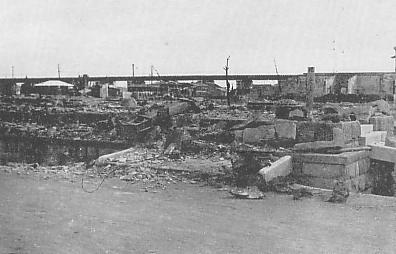
Honjo Ward Office after Great Kanto earthquake

Honjo-ku was one of the fifteen wards created in 1878 by the Law for the Reorganization of Counties, Wards, Townships, and Villages. Honjo was a low-lying district that was prone to frequent flooding. This made it an inexpensive place to live for the growing population crowding into Tokyo and Honjo was effectively a working-class neighbourhood with a number of workers and factories. It was a part of the industrial area described by historian Andrew Gordon as Nankatsu, extending from Honjo to the Arakawa Canal, most of which was not incorporated into Tokyo proper until 1932.

In 1905, the ward of Honjo had a population of 162,159; this increased to 247,533 just 12 years later. The population density in 1917 was over 100,000 people per square mile.

Honjo-ku was home to one of the wealthiest men in Japan in 1920, Yasuda Zenjirō.

Honjo was heavily impacted by the 1923 Great Kantō earthquake that occurred on 1 September. In Honjo, most of the people who died were killed by a fire near Ryōgoku Station that was being converted to a municipal park. The earthquake struck at a time when thousands of gas burners were in use in homes to cook midday meals. By 15 November, only one-third of the pre-quake population still lived in Honjo.

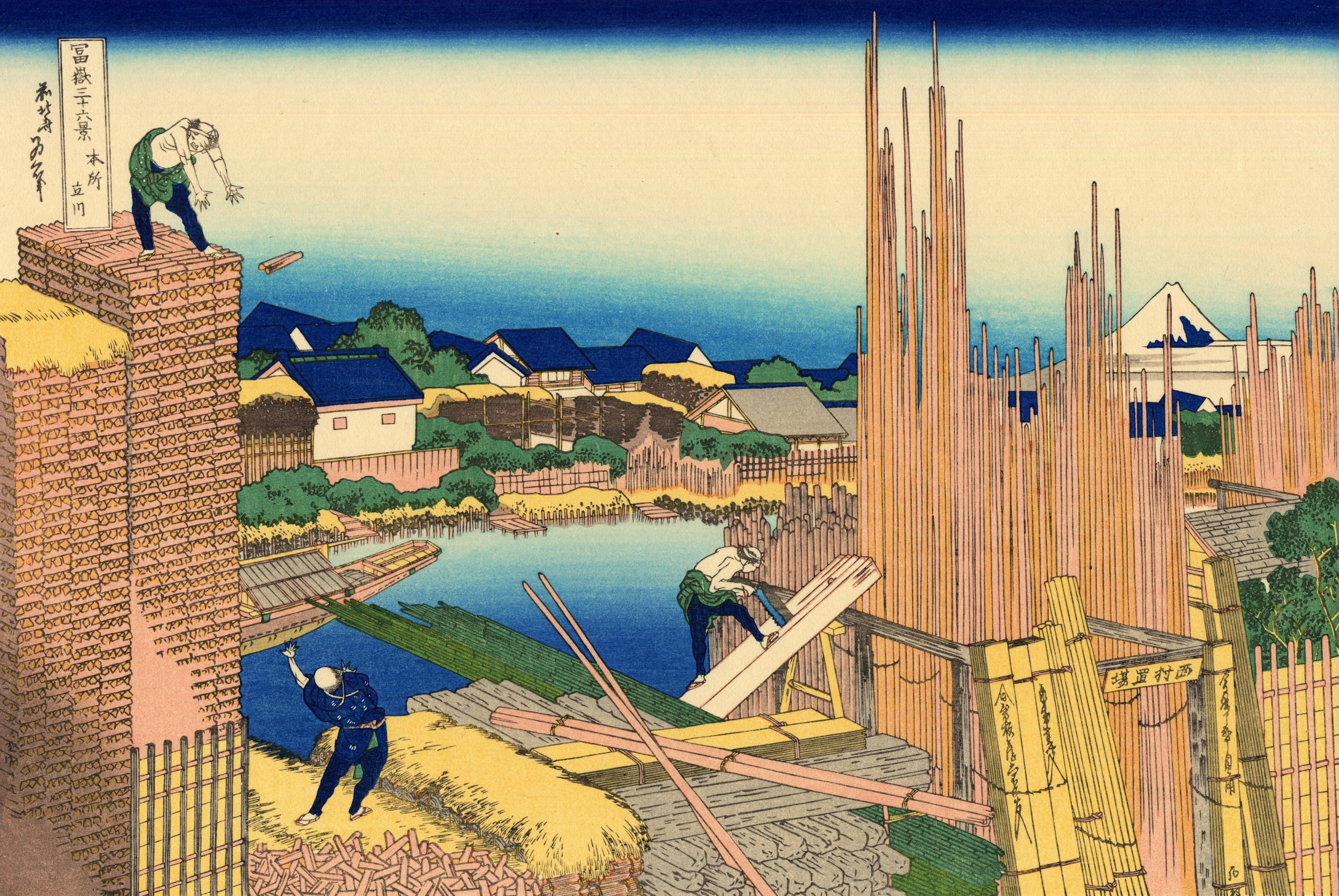
Hokusai

== Neighborhoods ==
The former Honjo ward contained the following modern districts:

- Azumabashi
- Chitose
- Higashikomagata
- Honjo
- Ishiwara
- Kamezawa
- Kikukawa
- Kinshi
- Kotobashi
- Midori
- Mukojima
- Narihira
- Ryōgoku (sumo district)
- Taihei
- Tatekawa
- Yokoami
- Yokokawa

== Places named after Honjo ==
- Honjo High School
- Honjo-Azumabashi Station
- Honjo Matsuzaka-cho Park
