= Araiwa Kamenosuke =

Japanese sumo wrestler (1871–1920)

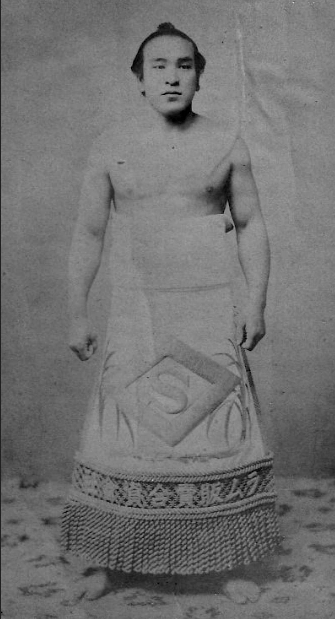

Personal information
- Native name: 荒岩 亀之助
- Born: Tokusaburo Yamazaki; March 1, 1871 Tottori, Japan
- Died: September 3, 1920 (aged 49)
- Height: 1.71 m (5 ft 7 1/2 in)
- Weight: 108 kg (238 lb)

Sport
- Sport: Sumo
- Retired: January 1909
- Heya: Oguruma
- Record: 120-29-88-10 draws-3 holds (Makuuchi)
- Debut: January 1894
- Highest rank: Ōzeki (May 1905)
- Championships: 6 (Makuuchi, unofficial)
- Updated on June 2008

Araiwa Kamenosuke (荒岩 亀之助, March 1, 1871 – September 3, 1920) was a Japanese sumo wrestler from Tottori Prefecture. His highest rank was ōzeki.

== Career ==
He made his debut in January 1894. He was promoted to the top makuuchi division in January 1897. He had the best record in five tournaments before the modern yūshō system awarding a championship to the wrestler with the best record was established. In two of these runs he did not suffer a single defeat or draw.

In May 1900, he had the best record as sekiwake without a single defeat or draw but was not promoted to ōzeki. The reason is said to be that he was small compared to other ōzeki.

In May 1905, he managed to reach ōzeki along Kunimiyama, who was promoted at the same time. Araiwa had a perfect tournament without a single defeat or draw. However, in the end, he was never promoted to yokozuna. He retired as an active wrestler in January 1909. His winning average in the top makuuchi division was over .800.

== Top Division Record ==
Araiwa Kamenosuke
-	Spring	Summer
1897	West Maegashira #8; 7–1–1; 1d Unofficial	West Maegashira #3; 6–1–1; 2d
1898	West Komusubi #1; 7–1–1; 1h	West Sekiwake #1; 6–2–1; 1d
1899	Sat out	West Komusubi #1; 8–1–1; Unofficial
1900	West Sekiwake #1; 4–2–4	West Sekiwake #1; 9–0–1; Unofficial
1901	West Sekiwake #1; 4–5–1	East Komusubi #1; 8–1–1; Unofficial
1902	East Sekiwake #1; 5–4–1	East Sekiwake #1; 3–1–6
1903	East Komusubi #1; 1–1–8	East Maegashira #1; 4–3–3
1904	East Maegashira #1; 6–1–1; 1d 1h	East Komusubi #1; 4–0–5; 1h
1905	East Komusubi #1; 8–0–1; 1d	West Ōzeki #1; 9–0–1; Unofficial
1906	West Ōzeki #1; 1–1–8	East Ōzeki #1; 4–1–5
1907	East Ōzeki #2; 6–2–1; 1d	East Ōzeki #2; 4–1–5
1908	East Ōzeki #2; 5–1–2; 2d	East Ōzeki #2; 3–0–6; 1d
1909	West Ōzeki #2; Retired; 0–0–10	x
Record given as win-loss-absent Top Division Champion Top Division Runner-up Retired Lower Divisions Key:d=Draw(s) (引分); h=Hold(s) (預り); Divisions: Makuuchi — Jūryō — Makushita — Sandanme — Jonidan — Jonokuchi Makuuchi ranks: Yokozuna — Ōzeki — Sekiwake — Komusubi — Maegashira

*Championships for the best record in a tournament were not recognized or awarded before the 1909 summer tournament, and the above unofficial championships are historically conferred. For more information see yūshō.

== See also ==
- List of past sumo wrestlers
- Glossary of sumo terms
