= Tsurugizan Taniemon =

Japanese sumo wrestler (1803–1854)

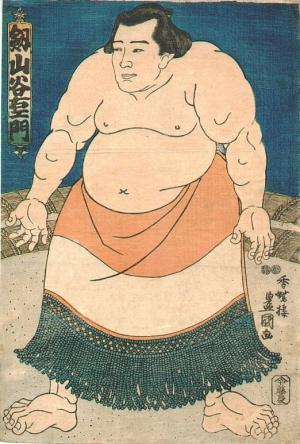

Personal information
- Native name: 劔山 谷右衛門
- Born: Bunzō; 1803 Toyama, Japan
- Died: October 17, 1854 (aged 51)
- Height: 1.67 m (5 ft 6 in)
- Weight: 115 kg (254 lb)

Sport
- Sport: Sumo
- Retired: February, 1852
- Heya: Onomatsu
- Record: 143-31-148; 22draws-6holds-5noresults (Makuuchi)
- Debut: March, 1827
- Highest rank: Ōzeki (February 1842)
- Championships: 6 (Makuuchi, unofficial)
- Updated on June 2008

Tsurugizan Taniemon (劔山 谷右衛門, 1803 – October 17, 1854) was a sumo wrestler from Toyama City, Japan. His highest rank was ōzeki. He won six tournament championships on an unofficial basis, before the yūshō system was established and was offered, but rejected, a yokozuna licence.

== Career ==
He joined Hatachiyama stable and was later trained under yokozuna Ōnomatsu Midorinosuke. At first, he fought under the ring name Waniishi. He was one of few wrestlers to defeat yokozuna Inazuma Raigorō, who held a winning percentage of 90.9. After he won all bouts as sekiwake in the November 1841 tournament, he was promoted to ōzeki in February 1842. He was to have the best individual record in six tournaments, equivalent to six yūshō today, and recorded 29 consecutive wins. He changed his techniques according to the circumstances. He was granted a yokozuna licence but rejected this and nominated Hidenoyama Raigorō instead. He held the ōzeki rank for 11 years, but he finally retired as an active wrestler in February 1852 shortly before the age of 50. He is said to have died on October 17, 1854, but his death date remains vague.

== Top division record ==
- The actual time the tournaments were held during the year in this period often varied.

Tsurugizan Taniemon
-	Spring	Winter
1834	East Maegashira #8; 3–1–3; 2d 1nr	East Maegashira #5; 7–1–1; 1d
1835	East Maegashira #5; 3–0–6; 1d	East Maegashira #3; 7–1–1; 1d
1836	East Maegashira #1; 5–0–1; Unofficial	East Komusubi #1; 7–0–2; 1d Unofficial
1837	East Komusubi #1; 4–1–4; 1d	East Komusubi #1; 6–0–2; 1d 1nr Unofficial
1838	East Komusubi #1; 3–0–3	East Komusubi #1; 2–2–6
1839	Sat out	Sat out
1840	East Komusubi #1; 6–3–1	East Komusubi #1; 5–0–5
1841	West Sekiwake #1; 6–0–3; 1h Unofficial	West Sekiwake #1; 8–0; Unofficial
1842	East Ōzeki #1; 3–0–4; 2d 1h	East Ōzeki #1; 5–1–2; 2d Unofficial
1843	East Ōzeki #1; 4–0–6	East Ōzeki #1; 4–1–4; 1d
1844	East Ōzeki #1; 3–1–5; 1d	East Ōzeki #1; 1–0–9
1845	Sat out	East Ōzeki #1; 5–1–2; 1d 1h
1846	East Ōzeki #1; 4–1–4; 1h	East Ōzeki #1; 4–2–4
1847	East Ōzeki #1; 4–2–4	East Ōzeki #1; 5–2–2; 1d
1848	East Ōzeki #1; 4–2–3; 1nr	East Ōzeki #1; 4–2–2; 1d 1nr
1849	East Ōzeki #1; 2–0–8	East Ōzeki #1; 6–2–1; 1nr
1850	East Ōzeki #1; 5–2–2; 1d	East Ōzeki #1; 7–1–1; 1d
1851	Sat out	East Ōzeki #1; 1–2–2; 3d 2h
1852	East Ōzeki #1; Retired; 0–0–10	x
Record given as win-loss-absent Top Division Champion Retired Lower Divisions Key: d=Draw(s) (引分); h=Hold(s) (預り); nr=no result recorded Divisions: Makuuchi — Jūryō — Makushita — Sandanme — Jonidan — Jonokuchi Makuuchi ranks: Yokozuna (not ranked as such on banzuke until 1890); Ōzeki — Sekiwake — Komusubi — Maegashira

*Championships for the best record in a tournament were not recognized or awarded before the 1909 summer tournament and the above unofficial championships are historically conferred. For more information see yūshō.

== See also ==
- Glossary of sumo terms
- List of past sumo wrestlers
