= Ōnomatsu Midorinosuke =

Japanese sumo wrestler

阿武松 緑之助 Ōnomatsu Midorinosuke
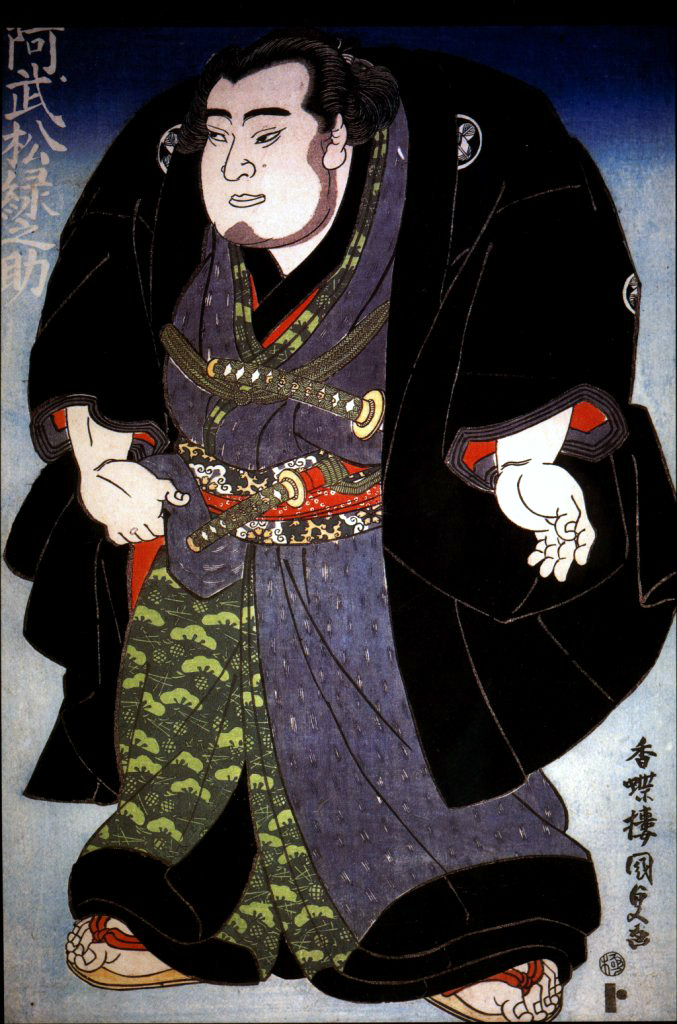
- 1840s woodblock print of Ōnomatsu by Kunisada

Personal information
- Born: Sasaki Jokichi; 1794 Shitsumi, Noto, Japan
- Died: 20 January 1852
- Height: 1.73 m (5 ft 8 in)
- Weight: 135 kg (298 lb)

Sport
- Sport: Sumo
- Retired: November 1835
- Heya: Takekuma → Shikoroyama
- Record: 142-31-37; 24draws-8holds-1no result (Makuuchi)
- Debut: March 1815
- Highest rank: Yokozuna (February 1828)
- Elder name: Ōnomatsu
- Championships: 5 (Makuuchi, unofficial)
- Updated on October 2007

Ōnomatsu Midorinosuke (Japanese: 阿武松 緑之助; 1794 – 20 January 1852) was a Japanese sumo wrestler from Noto Province. He was the sport's 6th yokozuna. He trained ōzeki Tsurugizan Taniemon.

== Early career ==
He was born in Shitsumi, Noto. His birth name remains ambiguous, but was claimed to be Sasaki Jokichi (佐々木 長吉). He was born to poor farmers and worked as a stable boy in the countryside. There, he earned a reputation in amateur sumo and decided to move to Edo in 1815 and got introduced to Takekuma Bunzo (武隈 文藏). He made his debut under the shikona Koyanagi Tsunekichi (小柳 常吉) in March 1815 and won the jonokuchi tournament.

== Makuuchi career ==
He reached the top makuuchi division in October 1822 and transferred to the Shikoroyama stable. He began to wrestle for the Chōshū Domain under the ring name Koyanagi Chokichi (小柳 長吉). In January 1824, he was defeated by Inazuma, but defeated others at the maegashira #2 rank and was promoted to komusubi. In the summer of 1825, he defeated Inazuma at the Hirakawa Tenjin Shrine. He was promoted to ōzeki in October 1826. In March 1827, he was given his definitive ring name by his lord and was renamed Ōnomatsu Midorinosuke (阿武松 緑之助) to evoke a famous scenic spot in Hagi, Yamaguchi (once part of the Chōshū domain).

== Yokozuna ==
Ōnomatsu was awarded a yokozuna license by the Yoshida family in February 1828. At the time, he was the first yokozuna to be promoted in 31 years, since the promotion of Onogawa Kisaburō. On 25 March 1829, Ienari Tokugawa was present to see Ōnomatsu defeat Inazuma. Ōnomatsu retired in October 1835 after eight years as yokozuna. In the top makuuchi division, he won 142 bouts and lost 31 bouts, recording a winning percentage of 82.1. He was permitted to stay as an elder under his ring name. While still an active wrestler, he recruited and raised ōzeki Koyanagi, to whom he gave his old ring name. He died in Edo in 1851 and his remains were divided between the Gyokusen-in temple of Kōtō, Tokyo and the Ritsuzo-ji temple in Teramachi, Kanazawa. Since the funeral of Ōnomatsu in the Tokyo temple, it was customary to have the wrestlers using the Ōnomatsu shikona buried in this temple (from the first to the fourth). In 1936, a monument made of natural stone pulled up from the seabed of Ugawa Port was erected the by a resolution of his hometown Ugawa Village.

== Fighting style ==
Ōnomatsu was known for being extremely careful in his moves, often waiting for his opponent to start first. In practice, he would want to shake his competitors' confidence by doing matta, waiting at the initial charge (or tachi-ai) of his sumo bouts. He would also attempt to win bouts by fair means or foul. He was often criticised for his fighting style but was a mild-mannered, righteous man, and never became egoistic, which made him very popular among Edo people. His rivalry with 7th yokozuna Inazuma boosted the popularity of sumo during the Bunsei era and Tenpō era. His overall career record was quite far behind Inazuma, but his record over Inazuma was five wins (including two other than honbasho), four losses, five draws and one hold.

== Top division record ==
- The actual time the tournaments were held during the year in this period often varied.

Ōnomatsu Midorinosuke
-	Spring	Winter
1822	x	East Maegashira #7; 6–3–1; 1d
1823	East Maegashira #5; 4–2; 1nr	East Maegashira #2; 7–2; 1d
1824	East Maegashira #2; 8–1–1; Unofficial	East Komusubi; 6–2–2
1825	East Komusubi; 8–2; Unofficial	East Sekiwake; 6–2–2
1826	East Sekiwake; 5–1–3; 1h	East Ōzeki; 8–0–1; 1d Unofficial
1827	East Ōzeki; 4–1–1; 1h	East Ōzeki; 6–0; Unofficial
1828	East Yokozuna; 3–3–2; 1d 1h	East Yokozuna; 7–1–2
1829	East Yokozuna; 5–0–1; 1d	East Yokozuna; 6–0–1; 2d 1h
1830	East Yokozuna; 7–1–1; 1h	East Yokozuna; 3–1–4; 2h
1831	East Yokozuna; 4–0–4; 2d	East Yokozuna; 3–0–5
1832	Not held	East Yokozuna; 7–1–1; 1d
1833	East Yokozuna; 5–0–1; 4d	East Yokozuna; 2–2; 3d 1h
1834	East Yokozuna; 6–1–1; 2d	East Yokozuna; 5–3–1; 1d
1835	East Yokozuna; 7–0–1; 2d Unofficial	East Yokozuna; Retired; 4–2–2; 2d
Record given as win-loss-absent Top Division Champion Retired Lower Divisions Key: d=Draw(s) (引分); h=Hold(s) (預り); nr=no result recorded Divisions: Makuuchi — Jūryō — Makushita — Sandanme — Jonidan — Jonokuchi Makuuchi ranks: Yokozuna (not ranked as such on banzuke until 1890); Ōzeki — Sekiwake — Komusubi — Maegashira

*Championships for the best record in a tournament were not recognised or awarded before the 1909 summer tournament, and the unofficial championships above are historically conferred. For more information, see yūshō.

== See also ==
- Glossary of sumo terms
- List of past sumo wrestlers
- List of yokozuna

Preceded by Onogawa Kisaburō	6th Yokozuna; 1828–1835	Succeeded by Inazuma Raigorō
Yokozuna is not a successive rank, and more than one wrestler can hold the title at once
