= Tamagaki Gakunosuke =

Japanese sumo wrestler (1784–1824)

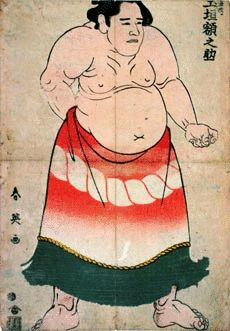

Personal information
- Native name: 玉垣 額之助
- Born: Tanaka Kisaku; 1784 Minamitakaki, Nagasaki, Japan
- Died: August 29, 1824 (aged 40)
- Height: 1.76 m (5 ft 9 1/2 in)
- Weight: 105 kg (231 lb)

Sport
- Sport: Sumo
- Heya: Tamagaki
- Record: 119-27-62; 13draws-1hold-14noresults (Makuuchi)
- Debut: October 1806
- Highest rank: Ōzeki (November 1814)
- Championships: 4 (Makuuchi, unofficial)
- Updated on July 2008

Tamagaki Gakunosuke IV (1784 – August 29, 1824) was a Japanese sumo wrestler from Minamitakaki, Nagasaki, Japan. His highest rank was ōzeki.

== Career ==
He made a professional debut in 1806 and was promoted to the top makuuchi division in 1810. In April 1814, he was ranked at maegashira 1, but in the very next November 1814 tournament, he was ranked at ōzeki. The reason was that the banzuke (the sumo wrestlers' hierarchy) was changed to that based on real ability.

In June 1823, Tamagaki and Kashiwado were awarded yokozuna licences by the Gojo family. However, after Kashiwado rejected the licence, he also rejected his. In the next year, he died while being an active wrestler.

In the top makuuchi division, he achieved the best record in only four tournaments, but his win ratio finally reached .815. Rival Kashiwado won 16 tournaments, but he recorded the win ratio .810.

== Top division record ==
- The actual time the tournaments were held during the year in this period often varied.

Tamagaki
-	Spring	Winter
1810	x	West Maegashira #6; 6–2–1; 1nr
1811	West Maegashira #6; 5–3; 2nr	West Maegashira #5; 3–1–2; 4d
1812	West Maegashira #5; 4–0; 1d Unofficial	West Maegashira #4; 6–2; 2d
1813	West Maegashira #1; 5–1–2; 2d	West Komusubi; 3–1–3; 3d
1814	West Maegashira #1; Sat out due to injury 0–0–10	West Ōzeki; 7–1–1; 1h Unofficial
1815	Not enrolled	Sat out
1816	West Ōzeki; 5–2; 1nr	West Ōzeki; 7–0–1; 1d 1nr
1817	West Ōzeki; 5–2–3	West Ōzeki; 6–2–2
1818	West Ōzeki; 7–0–2; 1nr Unofficial	West Ōzeki; 6–1–2; 1nr
1819	West Ōzeki; 5–1–3; 1nr	West Ōzeki; 3–0–6; 1nr
1820	West Ōzeki; 5–1	West Ōzeki; 7–1–1; 1nr Unofficial
1821	West Ōzeki; 6–1–2; 1nr	Not enrolled
1822	Not enrolled	West Ōzeki; 6–2–1; 1nr
1823	West Ōzeki; 3–1–2; 1nr	West Ōzeki; 4–2–3; 1nr
1824	West Ōzeki; 0–0–10	x
Record given as win-loss-absent Top Division Champion Retired Lower Divisions Key: d=Draw(s) (引分); h=Hold(s) (預り); nr=no result recorded Divisions: Makuuchi — Jūryō — Makushita — Sandanme — Jonidan — Jonokuchi Makuuchi ranks: Yokozuna (not ranked as such on banzuke until 1890); Ōzeki — Sekiwake — Komusubi — Maegashira

*Championships for the best record in a tournament were not recognized or awarded before the 1909 summer tournament, and the unofficial championships above are historically conferred. For more information, see yūshō.

== See also ==
- List of past sumo wrestlers
- Glossary of sumo terms
