= Banzuke =

Document listing sumo wrestling rankings

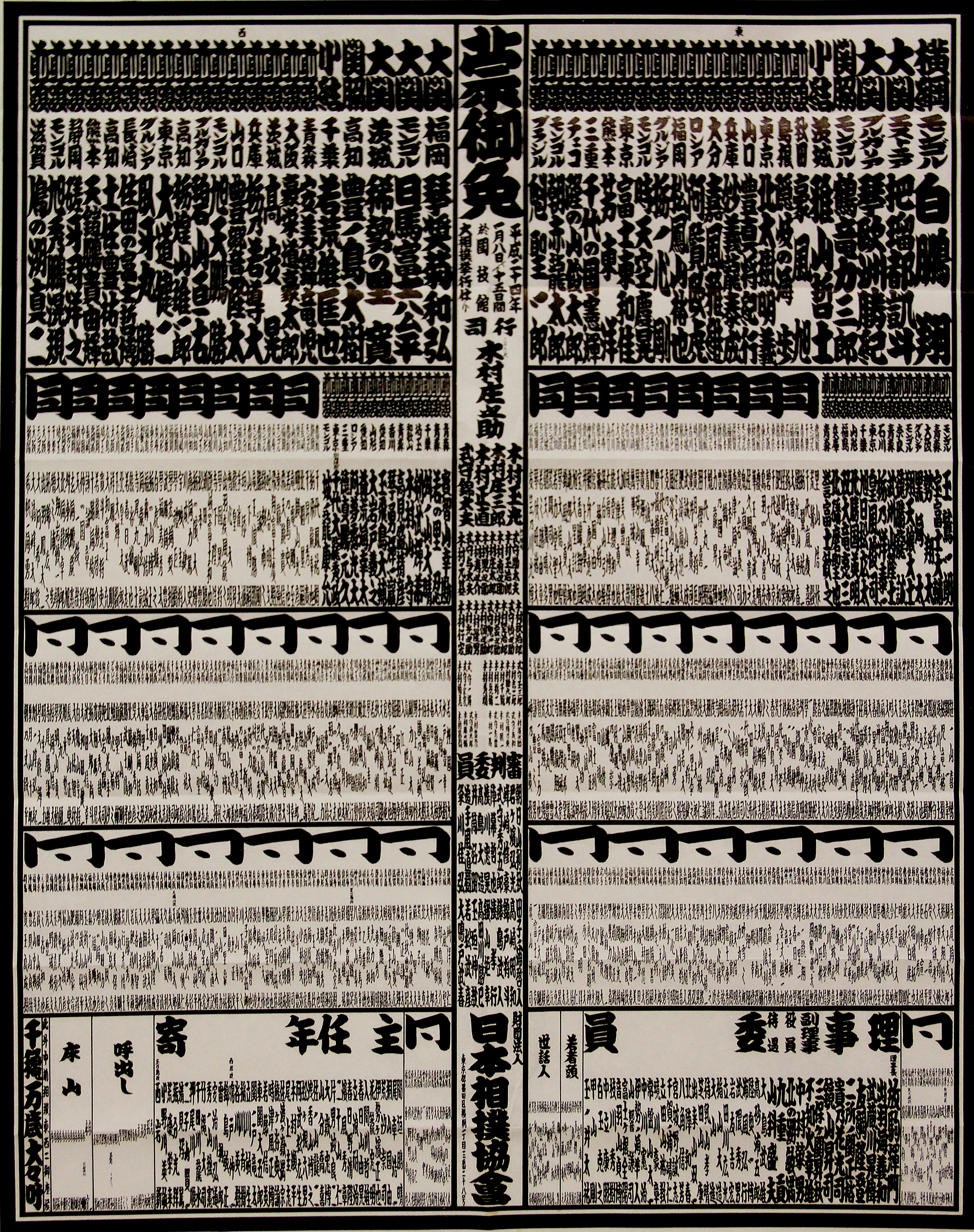
The banzuke from the January 2012 tournament

A banzuke (番付), officially called banzuke-hyō (番付表) is a document listing the rankings of professional sumo wrestlers published before each official tournament (honbasho). The term can also refer to the rankings themselves. The document is normally released about two weeks before the tournament begins.

On the banzuke, wrestlers are divided into East, which is printed on the right, and West, which is printed on the left. Each wrestler's full shikona (ring name), hometown and rank is also listed. The top of the page starts with the highest ranked makuuchi wrestlers printed in the largest characters, down to the wrestlers in the lowest divisions which are written in much smaller characters. The names of gyōji (sumo referees), yobidashi (ushers/handymen), shimpan (judges), oyakata (elders of the Japan Sumo Association), and occasionally tokoyama (hairdressers) are also listed.

While not as old as sumo itself, the form and production of this document can be traced as far back as 1761, and has been a defining component of sumo for centuries. As is the traditional Japanese style, a banzuke is meant to be read right to left, top to bottom. It is considered a collector's item by sumo fans.

== Banzuke preparation ==
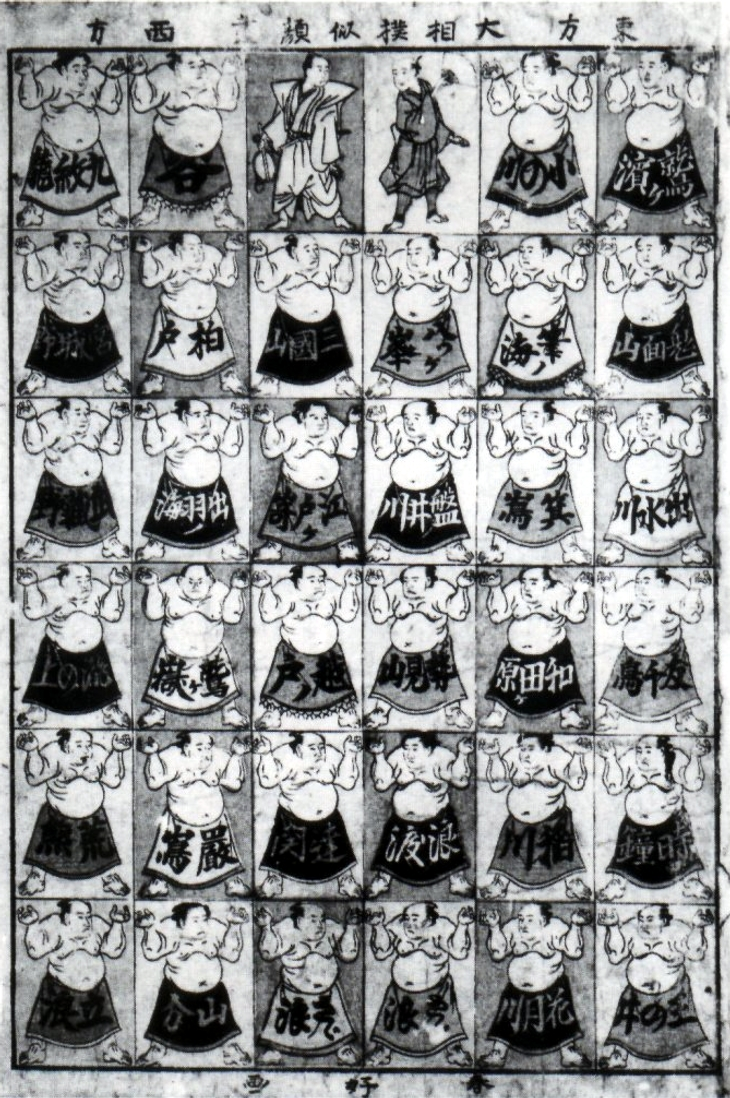
A pictorial banzuke from the April 1788 basho.

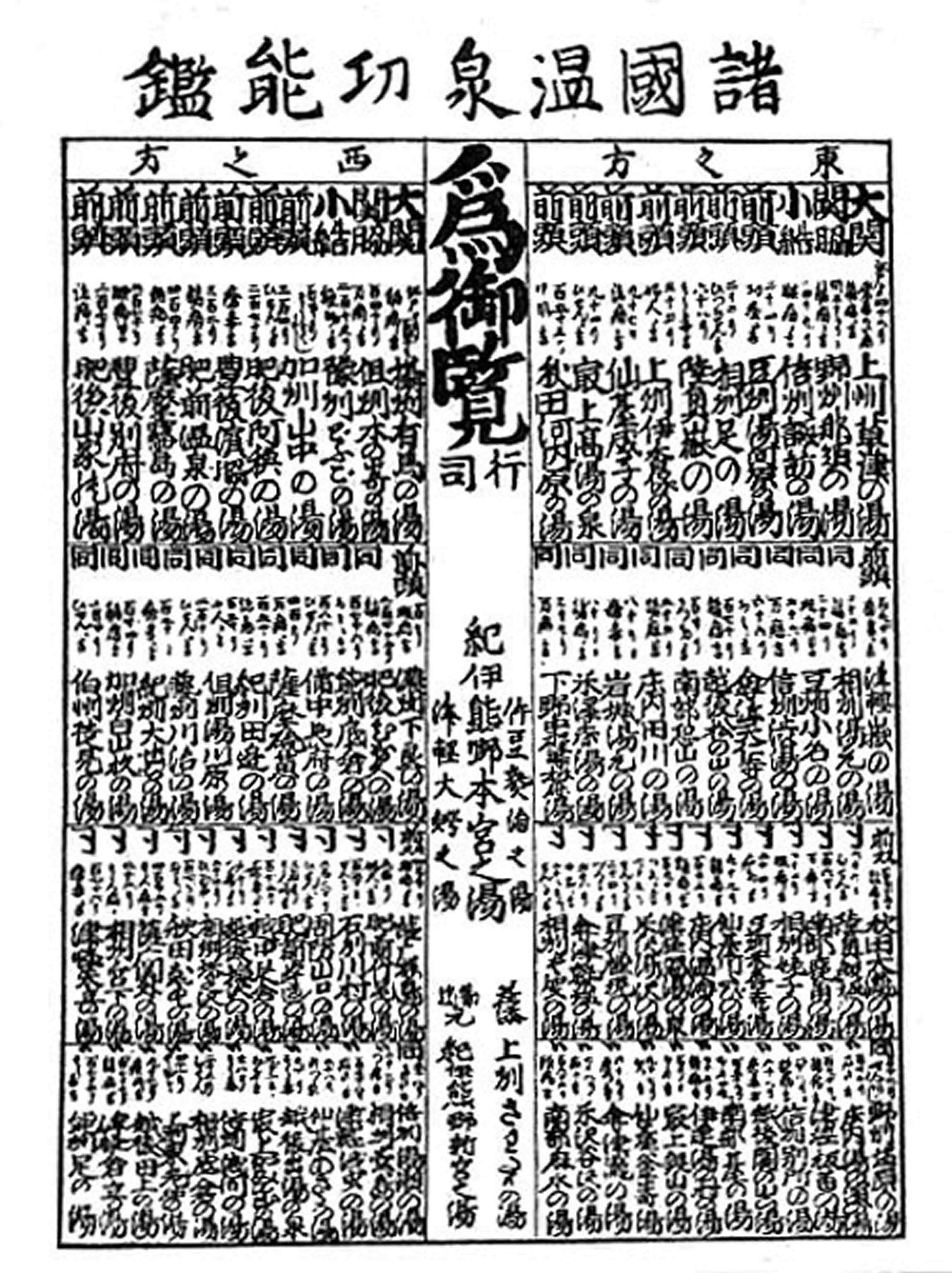
A banzuke for onsen (諸国温泉効能鑑, Shokoku onsen kōnō-kan), issued February 1851 (Kaei 4).

The rankings on the banzuke are decided by an assembly composed of 20 sumo judges and three supervisors who gather a few days after each official tournament. The assembly assigns ranks to over 600 wrestlers in six divisions based on their performance in the previous tournament. There are no precise rules for assigning rank, but the general rule is that a wrestler who achieved kachi-koshi (a majority of wins) will be raised in the rankings and a wrestler with a make-koshi (a majority of losses) will be lowered in the rankings. The degree of a wrestler's success or failure will help give the assembly a benchmark for figuring how far he rises or falls in the rankings.

High-ranking gyōji then take on the laborious task of copying down the new rankings on a traditional Japanese paper roll called a maki. They carefully write down the kanji characters of each wrestler participating in a tournament in a calligraphy style called sumo moji. The work is very intricate and requires a great deal of skill. It usually takes about a week to complete the document. The banzuke information is carefully guarded for several weeks before it is released, which is usually on the Monday 13 days before an official tournament begins. The exception is the information about wrestlers who rise from the third division makushita to the second division juryo: their names become known immediately because they obtain the status of sekitori and have to make necessary preparations for it. A banzuke release may also be pushed back if the traditional publishing date falls on a national holiday.

The banzuke is printed at a greatly reduced size on sheets of paper (58 cm x 44 cm) and copies are distributed by the Japan Sumo Association. Sumo stables buy a large quantity of them to give to their sponsors. Tea houses in the Tokyo sumo venue Kokugikan also buy them to give out to their patrons. They are also available for purchase for a small fee at tournament sites.

== See also ==
- List of sumo terms
- List of active sumo wrestlers
