= Sarugaishi River =

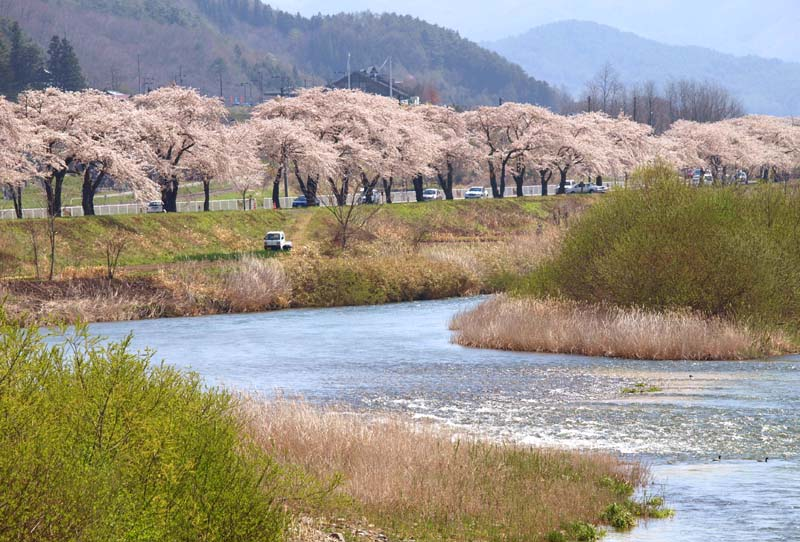
- The Sarugaishi in Tōno in spring

- Native name: 猿ヶ石川 (Japanese)

Location
- Country: Japan

Physical characteristics
- Source
  - location: Mt. Yakushi, Tōno, Iwate
  - elevation: 1,645 m (5,397 ft)
- Mouth: Hanamaki, Iwate
  - location: Kitakami River
  - coordinates: 39°23′55″N 141°07′59″E
- Length: 73.1 km (45.4 mi)
- Basin size: 952 km^{2} (368 sq mi)

The Sarugaishi River (猿ヶ石川, Sarugaishi-gawa) is a river in Iwate Prefecture, Japan.

The Sarugaishi River rises in the Kitakami Mountains just south of Mt. Yakushi in Tōno and empties into the Kitakami River in Hanamaki. The Tase Dam is on the Sarugaishi River, in eastern Hanamaki in the former town of Tōwa. This dam was completed in 1953. There is a legend that the entire floodplain of the river in Tōno was once a large lake dammed by the hills in Miyamori.

== Course ==
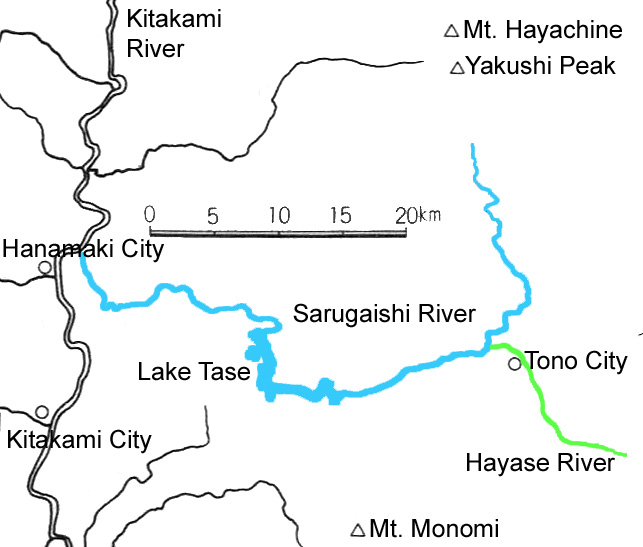
The Sarugaishi and Hayase Rivers

From its headwaters in Hayachine Quasi-National Park near Mt. Yakushi the Sarugaishi River flows directly south through the Tsukimoushi section of the city of Tōno. In Matsuzaki the river makes a slow and gentle bend to the west and flows west-southwest through Ayaori. In Miyamori the Sarugaishi encounters large hills that force the river into a steep and winding canyon which continues into Hanamaki where the Tase Dam impounds the water.

Lake Tase bends back to the north with the outflow of the dam directed eastward. The river then bends back around to flow west-northwest to Towa then winds in a series of loops generally westward before turning directly north and entering the Kitakami River opposite the mouth of the Segawa and just to the north of the Igirisu Coast of the Kitakami.

== Tributaries ==
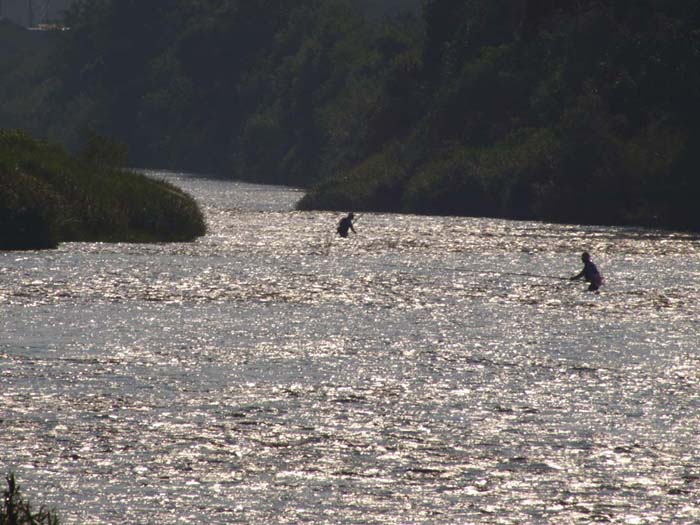
Late afternoon fishermen on the Sarugaishi in Miyamori

The Doku-gawa and the Tozenji-gawa join the Sarugaishi in Tsukimoushi.

The Kogarase-gawa is a large tributary that forms near Tachimaru Pass and joins the Sarugaishi in Matsuzaki. Japan National Route 340 follows along this scenic river for most of its length.

The Hayase begins in the region of Sennin Pass and empties into the Sarugaishi in downtown Tōno as the largest tributary. Japan National Route 283 parallels the course of this river and has views of the area, especially in the higher elevations.

The Rainai forms just north of Warabi Pass and empties into the Sarugaishi River near the mouth of the Hayase. The Rainai is dammed in two places for Tono's drinking water supply.

The Yamaya forms in the area of Ko Pass. Japan National Route 396 follows the course of the river for about half of its length.

The Miyamori enters just north of Tase Dam.
