= Rikuchū Province =

Former province of Japan

Rikuchū Province

Rikuchū Province (陸中国, Rikuchū no Kuni; Japanese pronunciation: [ɾʲì.kɯ̥̈.c̟͡ɕɨ̀ɨ̀ (nò̞ kɯ̈̀.ɲ̟ì), -c̟͡ɕɨ́ɨ̀ (nò̞ kɯ̈̀.ɲ̟ì)]) was an old province in the area of Iwate and Akita Prefectures. It was sometimes called Rikushū (陸州), with Rikuzen and Mutsu Provinces.

Rikuchu covered most of modern-day Iwate Prefecture: with the exceptions of Ninohe District, Ninohe City, the northern portion of Hachimantai City, and the northern portion of Kuzumaki Town; Kesen District, Rikuzentakata City, Ōfunato City, and the southern portion of Kamaishi City; but also including Kazuno City and Kosaka Town in Akita Prefecture.

Rikuchū was created shortly after the Meiji Restoration out of part of Mutsu Province.

== History ==
- January 19, 1869: Rikuchu Province is separated from Mutsu Province
- 1872: A census estimates the population at 510,521

== Historical districts ==
Rikuchū Province consisted of eighteen districts:

- Akita Prefecture
  - Kazuno District (鹿角郡)
- Iwate Prefecture
  - Isawa District (胆沢郡)
  - Iwai District (磐井郡)
    - Higashiiwai District (東磐井郡) - dissolved
    - Nishiiwai District (西磐井郡)
  - Iwate District (岩手郡)
    - Kitaiwate District (北岩手郡) - merged with Minamiiwate District to re-create Iwate District on March 29, 1896
    - Minamiiwate District (南岩手郡) - merged with Kitaiwate District to re-create Iwate District on March 29, 1896
  - Esashi District (江刺郡) - dissolved
  - Kunohe District (九戸郡)
    - Kitakunohe District (北九戸郡) - merged with Minamikunohe District to re-create Kunohe District on March 29, 1896
    - Minamikunohe District (南九戸郡) - merged with Kitakunohe District to re-create Kunohe District on March 29, 1896
  - Shiwa District (紫波郡)
  - Hienuki District (稗貫郡) - dissolved
  - Hei District (閉伊郡)
    - Higashihei District (東閉伊郡) - merged with Kitahei and Nakahei Districts to become Shimohei District (下閉伊郡) on March 29, 1896
    - Kitahei District (北閉伊郡) - merged with Higashihei and Nakahei Districts to become Shimohei District on March 29, 1896
    - Minamihei District (南閉伊郡) - merged with Nishihei District to become Kamihei District (上閉伊郡) on March 29, 1896
    - Nakahei District (中閉伊郡) - merged with Higashihei and Kitahei Districts to become Shimohei District on March 29, 1896
    - Nishihei District (西閉伊郡) - merged with Minamihei District to become Kamihei District on March 29, 1896
  - Waga District (和賀郡)
    - Higashiwaga District (東和賀郡) - merged with Nishiwaga District to re-create Waga District on March 29, 1896
    - Nishiwaga District (西和賀郡) - merged with Higashiwaga District to re-create Waga District on March 29, 1896

== See also ==
- List of Provinces of Japan
- Rikuchu Kaigan National Park
- Sanriku

== Other websites ==
Media related to Rikuchu Province at Wikimedia Commons

- Murdoch's map of provinces, 1903
