= Yotsugamine Tōkichi =

Japanese sumo wrestler

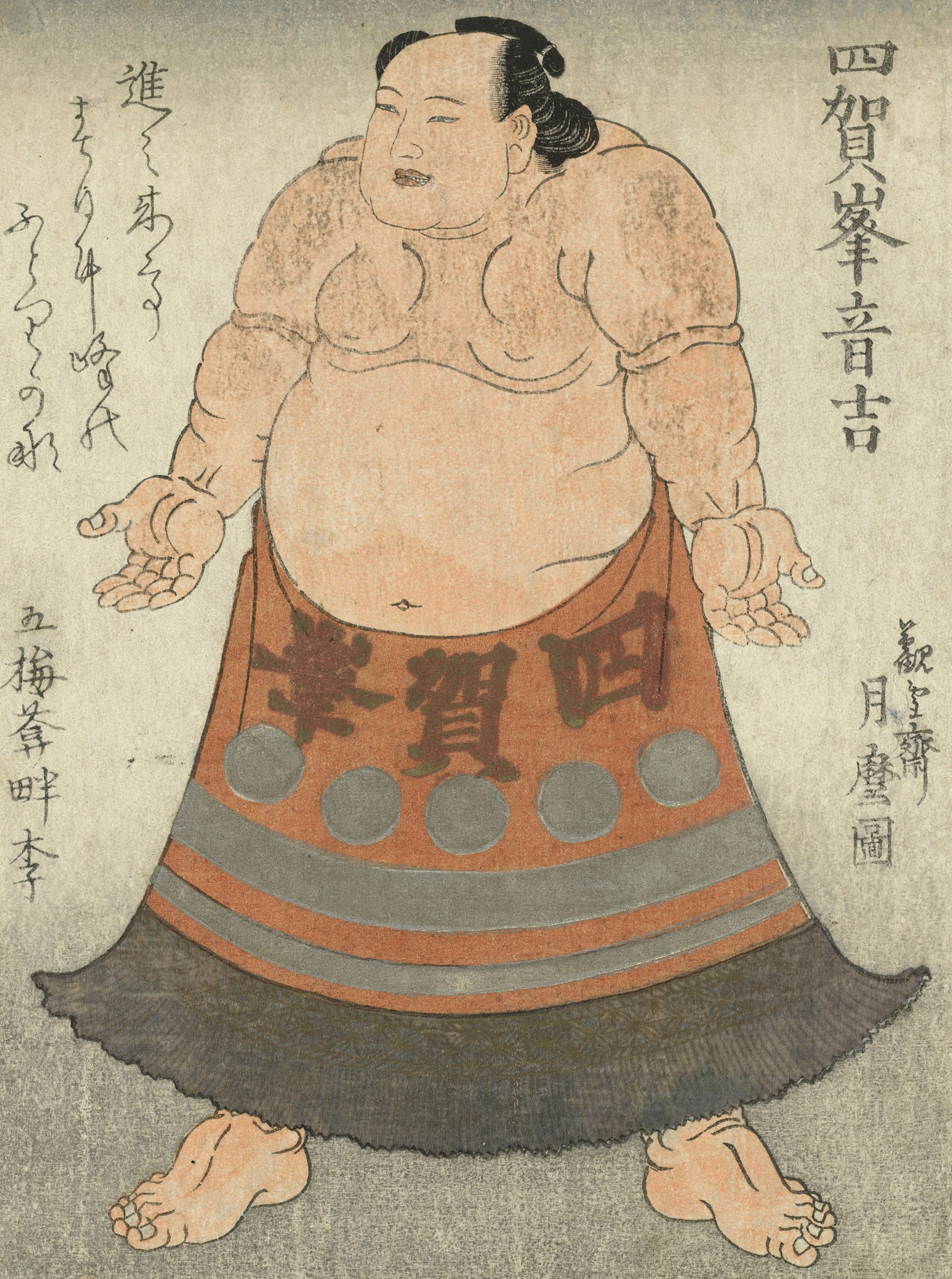

Personal information
- Native name: 四賀峰 東吉
- Born: Otokichi Odajima; 1790 Waga District, Mutsu Province, Japan
- Died: September 3, 1832 (aged 41–42)
- Height: 1.82 m (5 ft 11 1/2 in)
- Weight: 131 kg (289 lb)

Sport
- Sport: Sumo
- Retired: March, 1828
- Heya: Nishonoseki
- Record: 74-27-68-5 draws/1 hold
- Debut: November, 1812
- Highest rank: Ōzeki (October, 1824)
- Elder name: Yotsugamine
- Championships: 2 (Makuuchi, unofficial)
- Updated on October 2023

Yotsugamine Tōkichi (Japanese: 四賀峰 東吉; born Otokichi Odajima (小田島 乙吉, Odajima Otokichi), 1790 – September 3, 1832) was a Japanese sumo wrestler from Waga District, Mutsu Province (now Kitakami, Iwate Prefecture). His highest rank was ōzeki. He was the second wrestler from Iwate prefecture to reach this rank and the only titleholder before Miyagiyama's promotion in 1917, 93 years later.

== Career ==
Yotsugamine comes from a family with close ties to sumo, being the nephew and later son-in-law of ōzeki Nishikigi Tsukaemon (later known as Nishonoseki Gun'emon). He made his debut in November 1812 and joined the stable run by his uncle. In March 1819, he reached the makuuchi division, winning the equivalent of a first championship victory in 1821. In October 1822, he made his san'yaku debut at the rank of komusubi. He held this position for four tournaments, winning a second championship in 1823. Following a good tournament in 1824, he was promoted directly to ōzeki. In May 1825, he participated in a tournament for the Osaka-based sumo association in Namba. He was ranked as an ōzeki along with Ōnomatsu (then called Koyanagi). He held the rank of ōzeki for four years before retiring in 1828.

After his active retirement, he separated from his former master and opened his own stable under his old ring name. As a coach he raised ōzeki Akitsukaze.

== Top division record ==
- The actual time the tournaments were held during the year in this period often varied.

Yotsugamine Tōkichi
-	Spring	Summer
1817	Unknown	West Jūryō #7; 2–1; 1d
1818	Unknown	Unknown
1819	West Maegashira #5; 5–2–1	West Maegashira #5; 4–2–1; 1d-1h
1820	West Maegashira #4; 4–1; 1d	West Maegashira #3; 6–2–2
1821	West Maegashira #2; 7–1; 1d Unofficial	Sat out
1822	West Maegashira #1; 6–3–1	West Komusubi #1; 6–3–1
1823	West Komusubi #1; 3–0–3; 1d	West Komusubi #1; 7–2–1; Unofficial
1824	West Komusubi #1; 5–2–3	West Ōzeki #1; 3–1–6
1825	West Ōzeki #1; 5–2–3	West Ōzeki #1; 5–1–4
1826	West Ōzeki #1; 5–1–4	West Ōzeki #1; 1–3–5
1827	Sat out	Sat out
1828	West Ōzeki #1; Retired; 0–0–10	x
Record given as win-loss-absent Top Division Champion Top Division Runner-up Retired Lower Divisions Key:d=Draw(s) (引分); h=Hold(s) (預り); Divisions: Makuuchi — Jūryō — Makushita — Sandanme — Jonidan — Jonokuchi Makuuchi ranks: Yokozuna — Ōzeki — Sekiwake — Komusubi — Maegashira

*Championships for the best record in a tournament were not recognized or awarded before the 1909 summer tournament and the above championships that are labelled "unofficial" are historically conferred. For more information see yūshō.

== See also ==
- Glossary of sumo terms
- List of past sumo wrestlers
- List of ōzeki
