= Nitanai Station =

Railway station in Hanamaki, Iwate Prefecture, Japan

Nitanai Station 似内駅
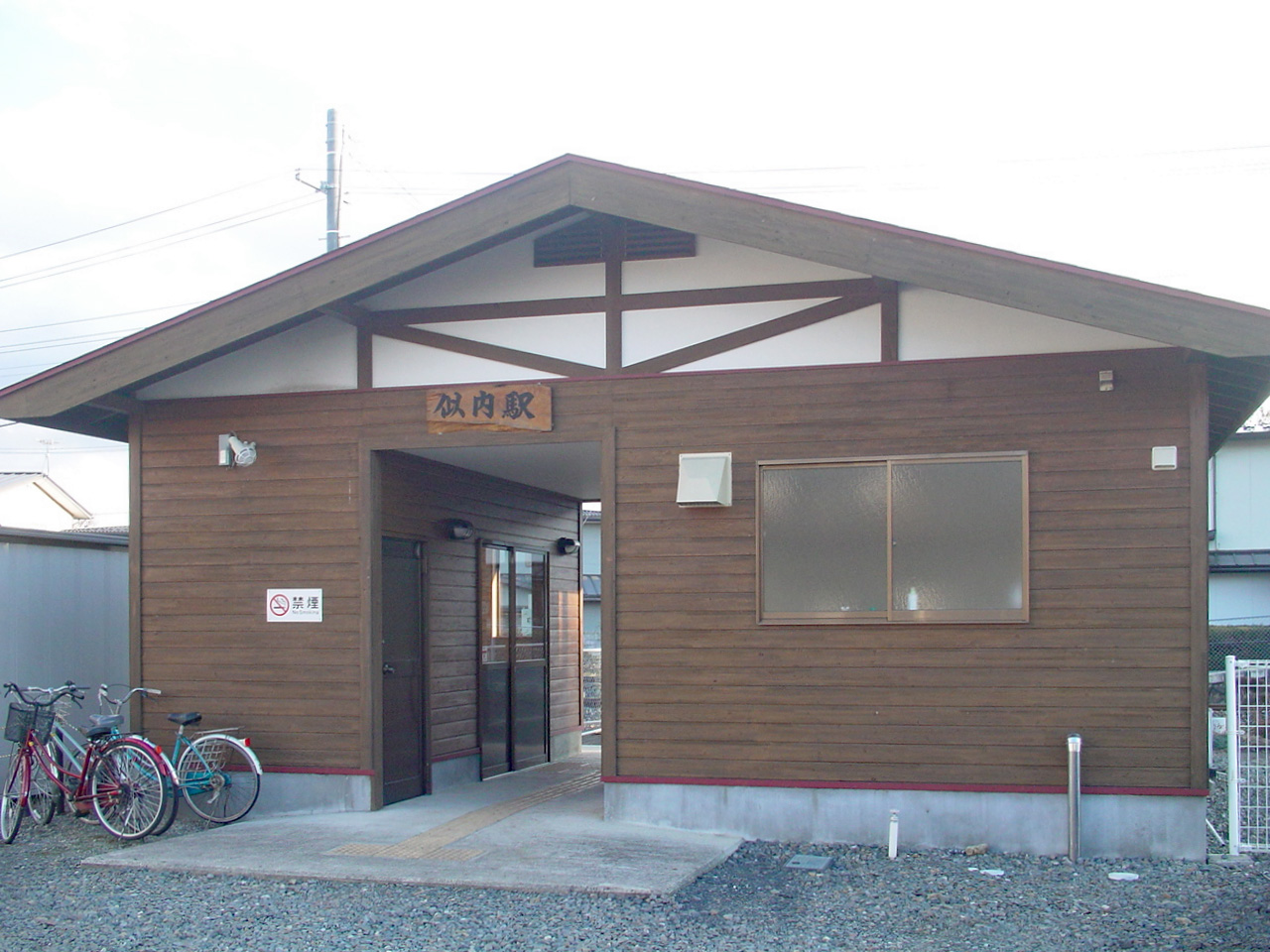
- Nitanai Station in February 2007

General information
- Location: Kaminitanai dai-9 jiwari, Hanamaki-shi, Iwate-ken 025-0007; Japan
- Coordinates: 39.4068°N 141.1409°E
- Operator: JR East
- Line: ■ Kamaishi Line
- Distance: 3.5 km from Hanamaki
- Platforms: 1 island platform
- Tracks: 2

Construction
- Structure type: At grade

Other information
- Status: Unstaffed
- Website: Official website

History
- Opened: 25 October 1913

Services
Preceding station	JR East	Following station
Hanamaki Terminus	Kamaishi Line Local	Shin-Hanamaki towards Kamaishi
Location
- Location within Iwate Prefecture Location within Japan

Nitanai Station (似内駅, Nitanai-eki) is a railway station in the city of Hanamaki, Iwate, Japan, operated by East Japan Railway Company (JR East).

== Lines ==
Nitanai Station is served by the Kamaishi Line, and is located 3.5 kilometers from the starting point of the line at Hanamaki Station.

== Station layout ==
The station has a single island platform. The platforms are not numbered. The station is unattended.

=== Platforms ===
station side	■ Kamaishi Line	for Tōno and Kamaishi
opp side	■ Kamaishi Line	for Hanamaki and Morioka

== History ==
Nitanai Station opened on 25 October 1913 as a station on the Iwate Light Railway (岩手軽便鉄道), a 762 mm (2 ft 6 in) light railway extending 65.4 km from Hanamaki to the now-defunct Sennintōge Station (仙人峠駅). The line was nationalized in 1936, becoming the Kamaishi Line. The station was absorbed into the JR East network upon the privatization of the Japanese National Railways (JNR) on 1 April 1987.

== Surrounding area ==
- Kitakami River
- National Route 4
- Hanamaki Airport

== See also ==
- List of railway stations in Japan
