= Shin-Hanamaki Station =

Railway station in Hanamaki, Iwate Prefecture, Japan

Shin-Hanamaki Station 新花巻駅
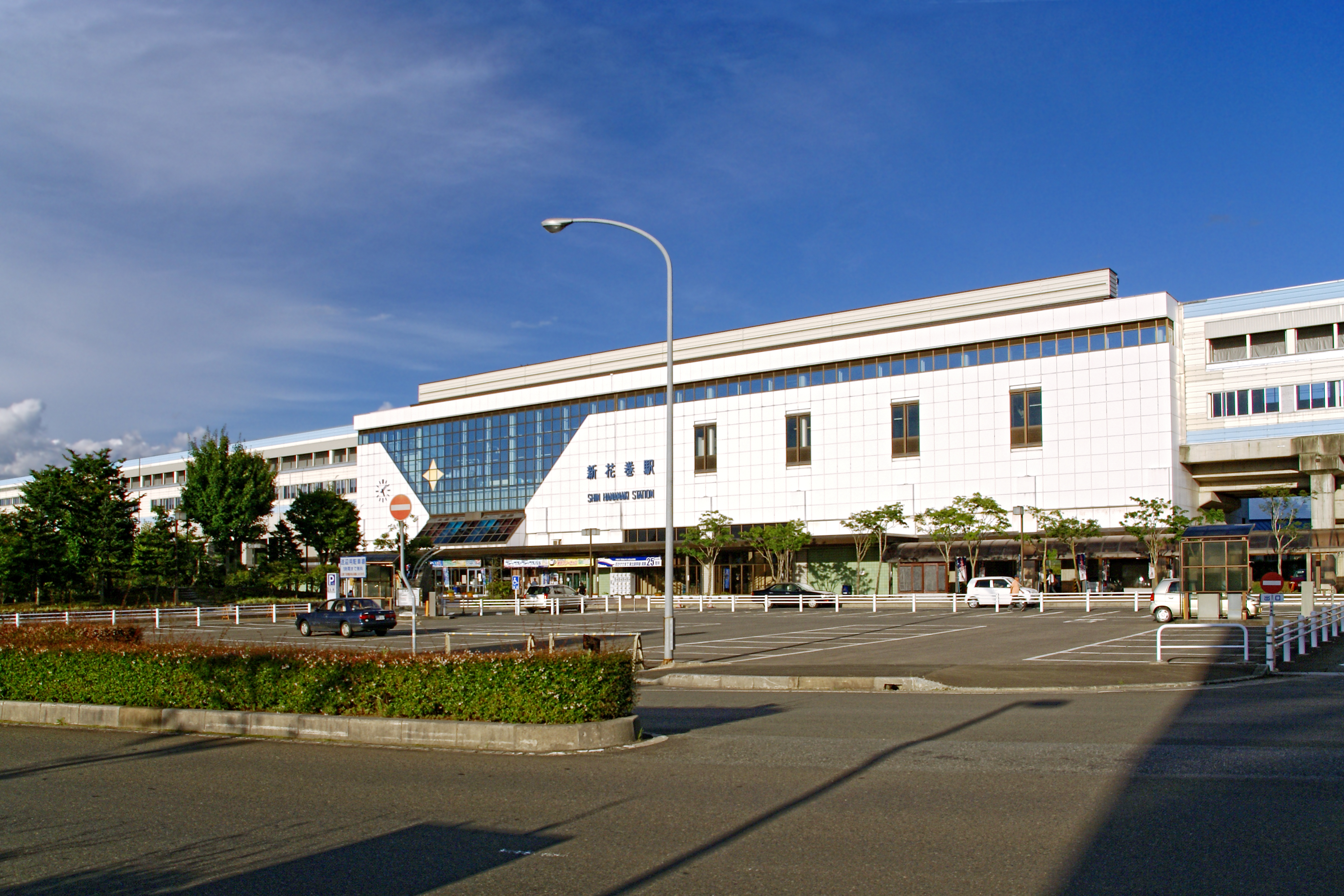
- Shin-Hanamaki Station in August 2007

General information
- Location: 10 Yazawa, Hanamaki-shi, Iwate-ken 025-0011; Japan
- Coordinates: 39.407334°N 141.173995°E
- Operator: JR East
- Lines: Tōhoku Shinkansen; Kamaishi Line
- Distance: 500.0 km (310.7 mi) from Tokyo
- Platforms: 3 side platforms
- Tracks: 3
- Connections: Bus

Other information
- Status: Staffed (Midori no Madoguchi)
- Website: Official website

History
- Opened: 14 March 1985; 41 years ago

Passengers
- FY2018: 938 daily

Services
Preceding station	JR East	Following station
Kitakami towards Tokyo	Tōhoku Shinkansen Hayabusa	Morioka towards Shin-Aomori
Kitakami towards Tokyo	Tōhoku Shinkansen Yamabiko	Morioka Terminus
Hanamaki Terminus	Kamaishi Line Rapid Hamayuri	Tsuchizawa towards Kamaishi
Nitanai towards Hanamaki	Kamaishi Line Local	Oyamada towards Kamaishi
Location
- Location within Iwate Prefecture Location within Japan

Shin-Hanamaki Station (新花巻駅, Shin-Hanamaki-eki) is a junction railway station in the city of Hanamaki, Iwate, Japan, operated by East Japan Railway Company (JR East).

== Lines ==
Shin-Hanamaki Station is served by the Tohoku Shinkansen and the Kamaishi Line. It is 500.0 rail kilometers from the southern terminus of the Tohoku Shinkansen at Tokyo Station and 6.4 rail kilometers from the terminus of the Kamaishi Line at Hanamaki Station. During the daytime, the station is served by approximately one Shinkansen service per hour in each direction, and one local train every one to two hours in each direction on the Kamaishi Line.

== Station layout ==
The station consists of two elevated opposed side platforms for the Tohoku Shinkansen, running approximately north to south, and a single unnumbered side platform at ground level serving the single-track Kamaishi Line. The main Shinkansen portion of the station has a Midori no Madoguchi staffed ticket office. The Tohoku Shinkansen platforms have chest-high platform edge doors set back a few meters from the platform edge in addition to platform edge fences, as there are no center tracks for non-stop trains at this station, and many trains pass through the station non-stop at high speed. The station building itself is designed with a motif from Miyazawa Kenji's Night on the Galactic Railroad.

=== Platforms ===
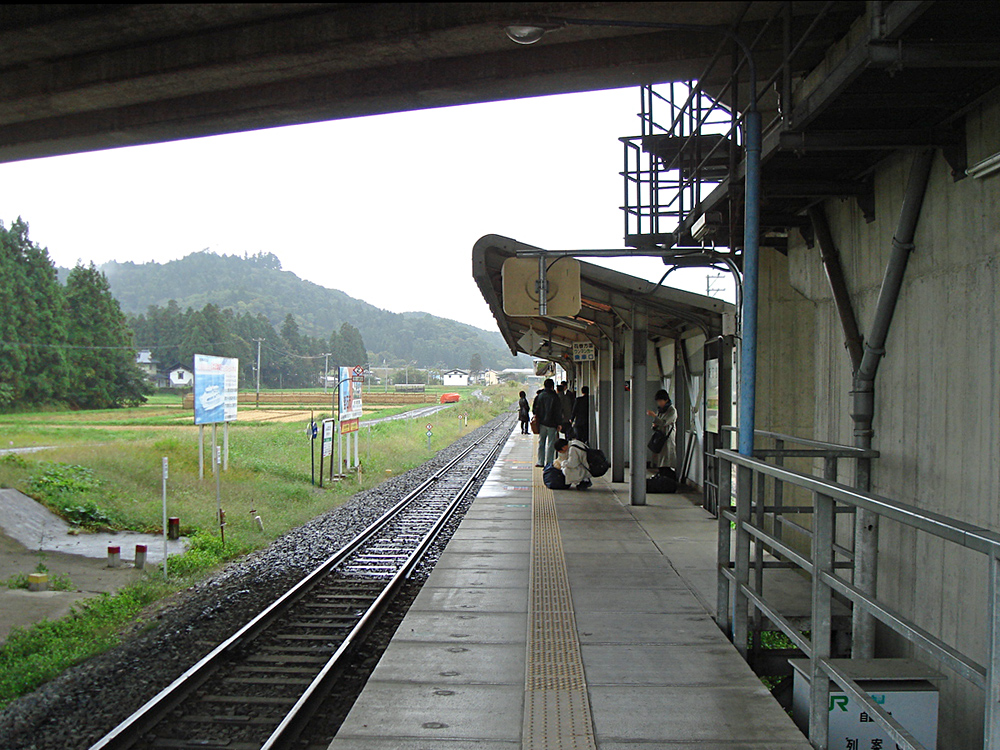
View of the Kamishi Line platform looking west, October 2006

1	■ Tohoku Shinkansen	for Morioka, Shin-Aomori, and Akita
2	■ Tohoku Shinkansen	for Sendai and Tokyo
-	■ Kamaishi Line	for Tōno and Kamaishi; Hanamaki and Morioka

== History ==
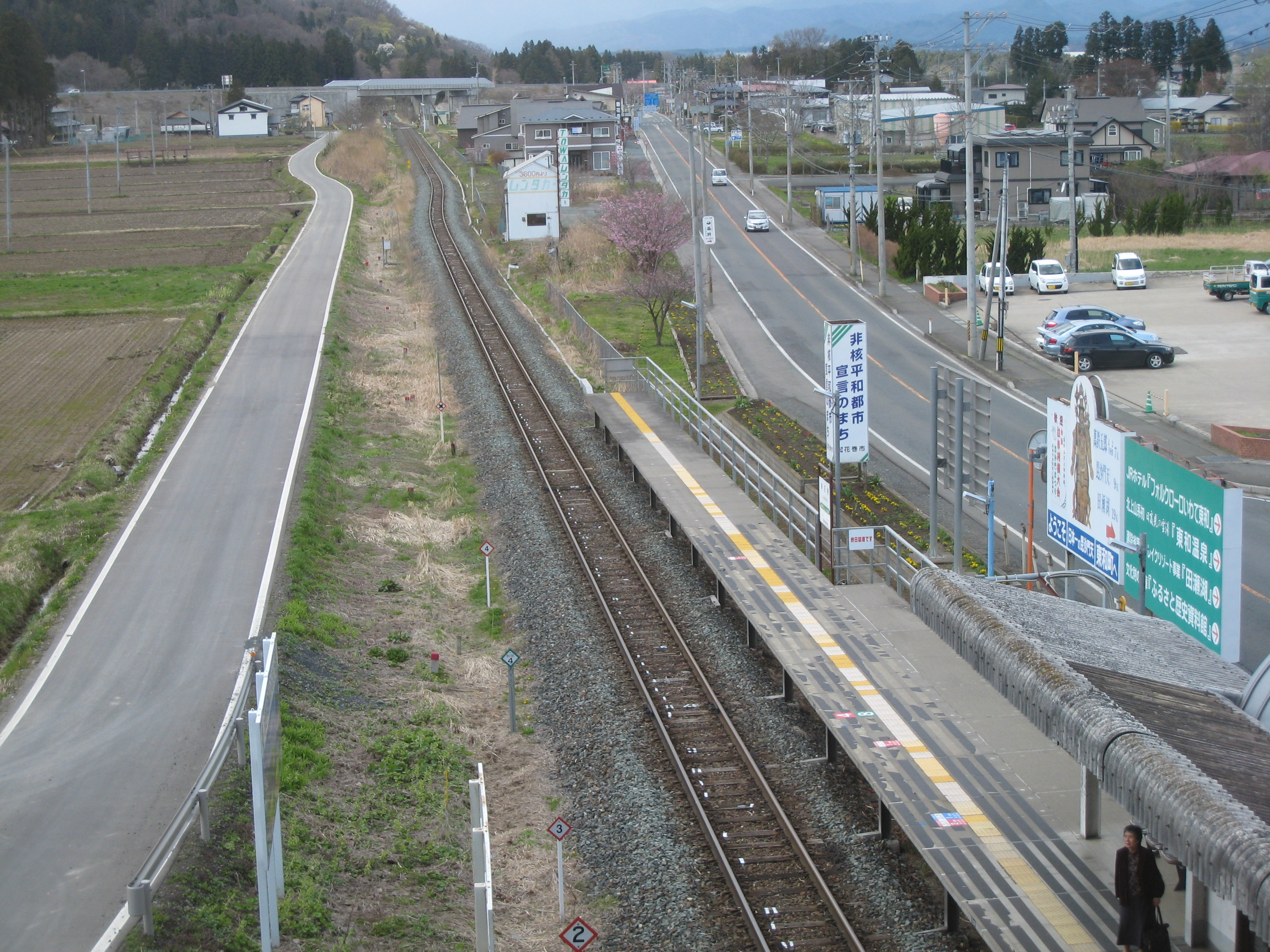
The Kamaishi Line looking west from Shin-Hanamaki Station in April 2013, showing the kink in the line where the former Yasawa Station used to be situated

Shin-Hanamaki Station opened on 14 March 1985. Construction was planned and funded by the city of Hanamaki and other local authorities, as the Tohoku Shinkansen was built several kilometers away from Hanamaki Station on the Tohoku Main Line. The former Yasawa Station (矢沢駅) located approximately 400 m to the west on the Kamaishi Line was closed coinciding with the opening of Shin-Hanamaki Station.

The station was absorbed into the JR East network upon the privatization of the Japanese National Railways (JNR) on 1 April 1987.

The Kamaishi Line platform and connecting passage to the main station building was renovated in 2014 with a style evoking the early 20th-century Taishō period portrayed in works by author Kenji Miyazawa, with work completed on 14 October 2014.

== Passenger statistics ==
In fiscal 2018, the station was used by an average of 938 passengers daily (boarding passengers only). The passenger figures for previous years are as shown below.

Fiscal year	Daily average
2000	892
2005	841
2010	793
2015	940

== Surrounding area ==
- National Route 4
- National Route 283
- National Route 456
- Kitakami River
- Sarugaishi River
- Miyazawa Kenji Memorial Museum

== See also ==
- List of railway stations in Japan
