= Sawauchi, Iwate =

Sawauchi 沢内村
- Former municipality
- Flag Emblem

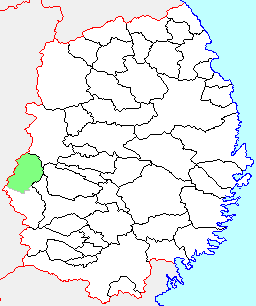
- Location of Sawauchi in Iwate Prefecture

- Location in Japan
- Coordinates: 39°26′2.8″N 140°45′01″E
- Country: Japan
- Region: Tōhoku
- Prefecture: Iwate Prefecture
- District: Waga District
- Merged: November 1, 2005 (now part of Nishiwaga)

Area
  - Total: 286.22 km^{2} (110.51 sq mi)

Population (November 1, 2005)
  - Total: 3,658
  - Density: 12.78/km^{2} (33.1/sq mi)
- Time zone: UTC+09:00 (JST)
- Symbols
- Bird: Common cuckoo
- Flower: Erythronium japonicum
- Tree: Fagus crenata

Sawauchi (沢内村, Sawauchi-mura) was a village located in Waga District, Iwate Prefecture, Japan.

== History ==
The village of Yuda created on April 1, 1889, within Nishiwaga District with the establishment of the municipality system. Nishiwaga merged with Higashiwaga District to form Waga District on March 29, 1896.

On November 1, 2005, Sawauchi, along with the town of Yuda (also from Waga District), was merged to create the town of Nishiwaga, and no longer exists as an independent municipality.

As of November 2005, the village had an estimated population of 3,658 and a population density of 12.78 persons per km^{2}. The total area was 286.22 km^{2}.

== Climate ==
Climate data for Sawauchi (2017−2020 normals, extremes 2017−present)
Month	Jan	Feb	Mar	Apr	May	Jun	Jul	Aug	Sep	Oct	Nov	Dec	Year
Record high °C (°F)	7.0 (44.6)	10.2 (50.4)	16.2 (61.2)	22.9 (73.2)	31.6 (88.9)	29.2 (84.6)	33.1 (91.6)	34.1 (93.4)	31.4 (88.5)	26.9 (80.4)	22.3 (72.1)	13.5 (56.3)	34.1 (93.4)
Record low °C (°F)	−17.9 (−0.2)	−22.1 (−7.8)	−12.2 (10.0)	−7.9 (17.8)	−2.2 (28.0)	4.5 (40.1)	11.7 (53.1)	8.5 (47.3)	1.8 (35.2)	−1.7 (28.9)	−13.1 (8.4)	−12.2 (10.0)	−22.1 (−7.8)
Source: JMA
