= Oyamada Station =

Railway station in Hanamaki, Iwate Prefecture, Japan

Oyamada Station 小山田駅
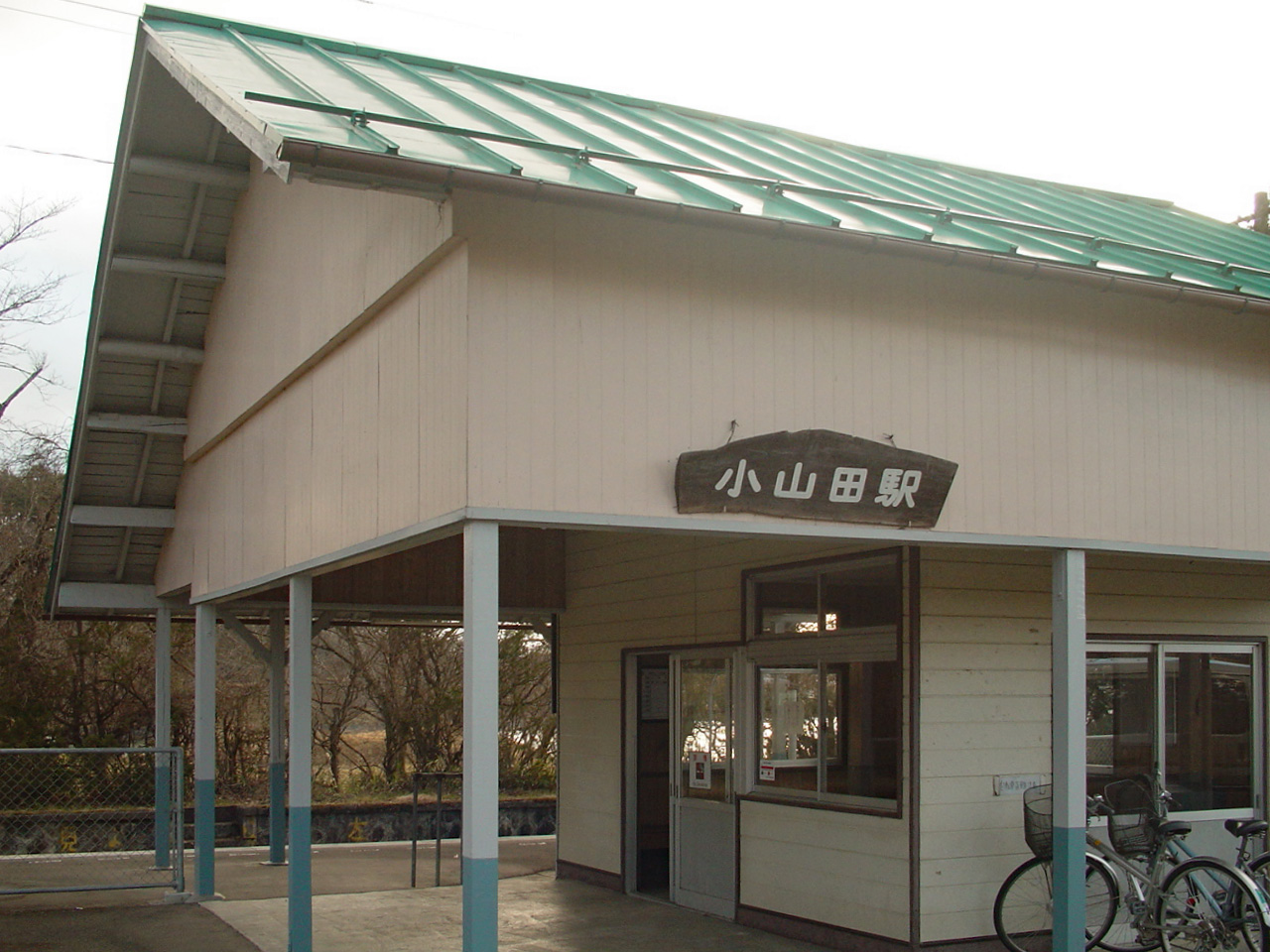
- Oyamada Station in February 2007

General information
- Location: 8 Kōda, Hanamaki-shi, Iwate-ken 025-0013; Japan
- Coordinates: 39.4087°N 141.1939°E
- Operator: JR East
- Line: ■ Kamaishi Line
- Distance: 8.3 km from Hanamaki
- Platforms: 1 side platform
- Tracks: 1

Construction
- Structure type: At grade

Other information
- Status: Unstaffed
- Website: Official website

History
- Opened: 25 October 1913
- Rebuilt: 2017-2018

Services
Preceding station	JR East	Following station
Shin-Hanamaki towards Hanamaki	Kamaishi Line Local	Tsuchizawa towards Kamaishi
Location
- Location within Iwate Prefecture Location within Japan

Oyamada Station (小山田駅, Oyamada-eki) is a railway station in the city of Hanamaki, Iwate, Japan, operated by East Japan Railway Company (JR East).

== Lines ==
Oyamada Station is served by the 90.2 km Kamaishi Line, and is located 8.3 km from the starting point of the line at Hanamaki Station.

== Station layout ==
The station has a single side platform serving a single bi-directional track. The station is unattended.

== History ==
Oyamada Station opened on 25 October 1913 as the Kōda Stop (幸田停留場, Kōda Teiryūjō) on the Iwate Light Railway (岩手軽便鉄道), a 762 mm (2 ft 6 in) light railway extending 65.4 km from Hanamaki to the now-defunct Sennintōge Station (仙人峠駅). It became a full passenger station and was renamed Oyamada Station 23 November 1915. The Iwate Light Railway was nationalized on 1 August 1936, becoming the Kamaishi Line. The station was absorbed into the JR East network upon the privatization of the Japanese National Railways (JNR) on 1 April 1987.

The station building is scheduled to be rebuilt and replaced with a new single-storey wooden structure between December 2017 and February 2018.

== Surrounding area ==
The station is located in a rural area.

== See also ==
- List of railway stations in Japan
