= Mount Hayachine =

Mountain in Iwate Prefecture, Japan

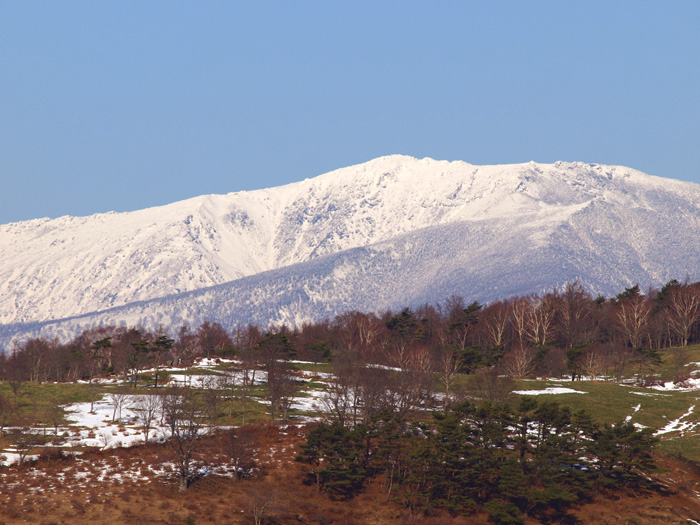
- Mount Hayachine from the south in November 2009

Highest point
- Elevation: 1,917 m (6,289 ft)
- Prominence: 1,489 m (4,885 ft)
- Listing: 100 Famous Mountains of Japan; Ribu
- Coordinates: 39°33′30″N 141°29′20″E

Geography
- Location within Iwate Prefecture Location within Japan
- Location: Tōhoku region, Honshū, Japan
- Parent range: Kitakami Mountains

Climbing
- Easiest route: Hiking

Mount Hayachine (早池峰山, Hayachine-san) is the highest mountain in the Kitakami Range, located in the Tōhoku region of northern Honshū, Japan. With an elevation of 1,917 m (6,289 ft), it is the second highest in Iwate Prefecture after Mount Iwate. Mount Hayachine is mentioned in 100 Famous Japanese Mountains, a book written in 1964 by Kyūya Fukada. The mountain is on the borders of the municipalities of Hanamaki, Tōno, and Miyako, east of the prefectural capital of Morioka.

== Outline ==
Mount Hayachine is composed of peridotite olivine and serpentine rock, and is unusual in that it lies farther east than other large mountains on Honshū, and is geologically part of the oldest formation in Japan. There are many alpine plants and flower species that are endemic to the area. It is also the southernmost location for the Sakhalin Spruce. For these reasons, 1370 hectares were declared a Special Nature Conservation Area on May 17, 1975 by the national government. On June 10, 1982 an additional 5463 hectares became Hayachine Quasi-National Park.

== See also ==
- List of Special Places of Scenic Beauty, Special Historic Sites and Special Natural Monuments
