= Ishidoriya, Iwate =

Ishidoriya 石鳥谷町
- Former municipality
- Flag Emblem

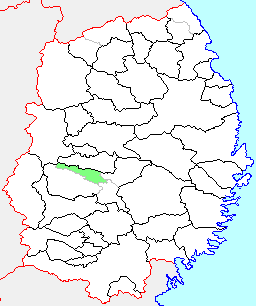
- Location of Ishidoriya in Iwate Prefecture

- Location in Japan
- Coordinates: 39°29′2.2″N 141°8′49.4″E
- Country: Japan
- Region: Tōhoku
- Prefecture: Iwate Prefecture
- District: Hienuki District
- Merged: January 1, 2006 (now part of Hanamaki)

Area
  - Total: 118.57 km^{2} (45.78 sq mi)

Population (January 1, 2006)
  - Total: 15,951
  - Density: 134.5/km^{2} (348/sq mi)
- Time zone: UTC+09:00 (JST)
- Symbols
- Bird: Black kite
- Flower: Prunus mume
- Tree: Cryptomeria

Ishidoriya (石鳥谷町, Ishidoriya-chō) was a town located in Hienuki District, Iwate Prefecture, Japan.

== History ==
The village of Kōchi (好地村) was created on April 1, 1889 with the establishment of the municipalities system. The village was raised to town status on April 1, 1928 and renamed Ishidoriya at that time.

On January 1, 2006, Ishidoriya, along with the town of Ōhasama (from Hienuki District), and the town of Tōwa (from Waga District), was merged into the expanded city of Hanamaki, and no longer exists as an independent municipality.

As of January 1, 2006, the town had an estimated population of 15,951 and a population density of 134.5 persons per km^{2}. The total area was 118.57 km^{2}.

Ishidoriya had a sister city relationship with Rutland, Vermont.
