= Yuda, Iwate =

Yuda 湯田町
- Former municipality
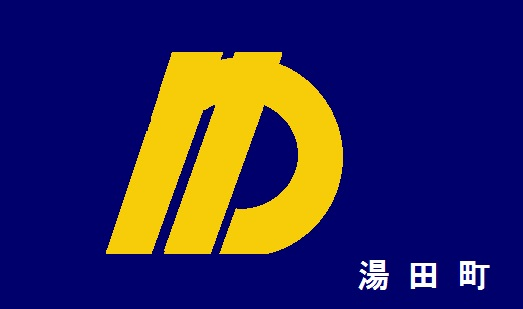
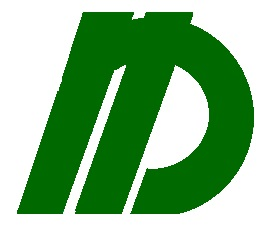
- Flag Emblem

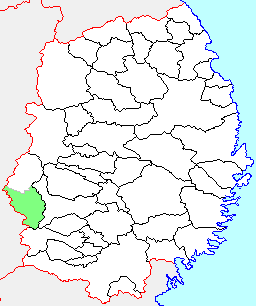
- Location of Yuda in Iwate Prefecture

- Location in Japan
- Coordinates: 39°19′3.4″N 140°46′43.7″E
- Country: Japan
- Region: Tōhoku
- Prefecture: Iwate Prefecture
- District: Waga District
- Merged: November 1, 2005 (now part of Nishiwaga)

Area
  - Total: 304.56 km^{2} (117.59 sq mi)

Population (November 1, 2005)
  - Total: 3,710
  - Density: 12.18/km^{2} (31.5/sq mi)
- Time zone: UTC+09:00 (JST)
- Climate: Dfa
- Symbols
- Bird: Copper pheasant
- Flower: Azalea
- Tree: Fagus crenata

Yuda (湯田町, Yuda-machi) was a town located in Waga District, Iwate Prefecture, Japan.

== History ==
The village of Yuda created on April 1, 1889 within Nishiwaga District with the establishment of the municipality system. Nishiwaga merged with HIgashiwaga District to form Waga District on March 29, 1896. Yuda was raised to town status on August 1, 1964.

On November 1, 2005, Yuda, along with the village of Sawauchi (also from Waga District), was merged to create the town of Nishiwaga, and no longer exists as an independent municipality.

As of November 2005, the town had an estimated population of 3,710 and a population density of 12.18 persons per km². The total area was 304.56 km².

== Climate ==
Climate data for Yuda, Iwate (1991−2020 normals, extremes 1976−present)
Month	Jan	Feb	Mar	Apr	May	Jun	Jul	Aug	Sep	Oct	Nov	Dec	Year
Record high °C (°F)	10.3 (50.5)	12.6 (54.7)	17.8 (64.0)	27.8 (82.0)	32.1 (89.8)	31.2 (88.2)	34.3 (93.7)	34.9 (94.8)	32.4 (90.3)	26.8 (80.2)	22.2 (72.0)	15.9 (60.6)	34.9 (94.8)
Mean daily maximum °C (°F)	0.4 (32.7)	1.5 (34.7)	5.2 (41.4)	12.2 (54.0)	18.9 (66.0)	22.5 (72.5)	25.7 (78.3)	27.2 (81.0)	23.1 (73.6)	16.8 (62.2)	9.7 (49.5)	2.8 (37.0)	13.8 (56.9)
Daily mean °C (°F)	−2.6 (27.3)	−2.1 (28.2)	0.8 (33.4)	6.3 (43.3)	12.9 (55.2)	17.4 (63.3)	21.3 (70.3)	22.3 (72.1)	18.1 (64.6)	11.4 (52.5)	4.9 (40.8)	−0.3 (31.5)	9.2 (48.5)
Mean daily minimum °C (°F)	−5.9 (21.4)	−5.7 (21.7)	−3.2 (26.2)	0.9 (33.6)	7.3 (45.1)	12.8 (55.0)	17.6 (63.7)	18.5 (65.3)	14.1 (57.4)	7.0 (44.6)	0.9 (33.6)	−3.2 (26.2)	5.1 (41.2)
Record low °C (°F)	−19.0 (−2.2)	−22.9 (−9.2)	−16.4 (2.5)	−12.0 (10.4)	−1.7 (28.9)	3.6 (38.5)	5.9 (42.6)	9.6 (49.3)	1.8 (35.2)	−2.4 (27.7)	−9.2 (15.4)	−16.7 (1.9)	−22.9 (−9.2)
Average precipitation mm (inches)	206.6 (8.13)	151.1 (5.95)	135.6 (5.34)	114.9 (4.52)	132.2 (5.20)	145.2 (5.72)	223.2 (8.79)	212.5 (8.37)	169.2 (6.66)	178.7 (7.04)	204.3 (8.04)	230.4 (9.07)	2,108.8 (83.02)
Average snowfall cm (inches)	322 (127)	242 (95)	162 (64)	43 (17)	0 (0)	0 (0)	0 (0)	0 (0)	0 (0)	0 (0)	50 (20)	239 (94)	1,065 (419)
Average rainy days	24.1	21.0	18.7	14.3	13.0	11.8	14.7	13.2	13.4	14.9	19.1	23.2	201.4
Average snowy days	23.3	19.4	17.3	6.5	0	0	0	0	0	0	4.2	16.8	87.5
Mean monthly sunshine hours	31.2	49.3	102.9	151.7	188.0	165.5	142.4	160.9	138.4	127.0	84.6	38.4	1,383.3
Source 1: JMA
Source 2: JMA
