= Japan National Route 396 =

Road in Iwate prefecture, Japan

National Route 396
- 国道396号

Route information
- Length: 58.7 km (36.5 mi)

Location
- Country: Japan

Highway system
- National highways of Japan; Expressways of Japan
← National Route 395	→ National Route 397

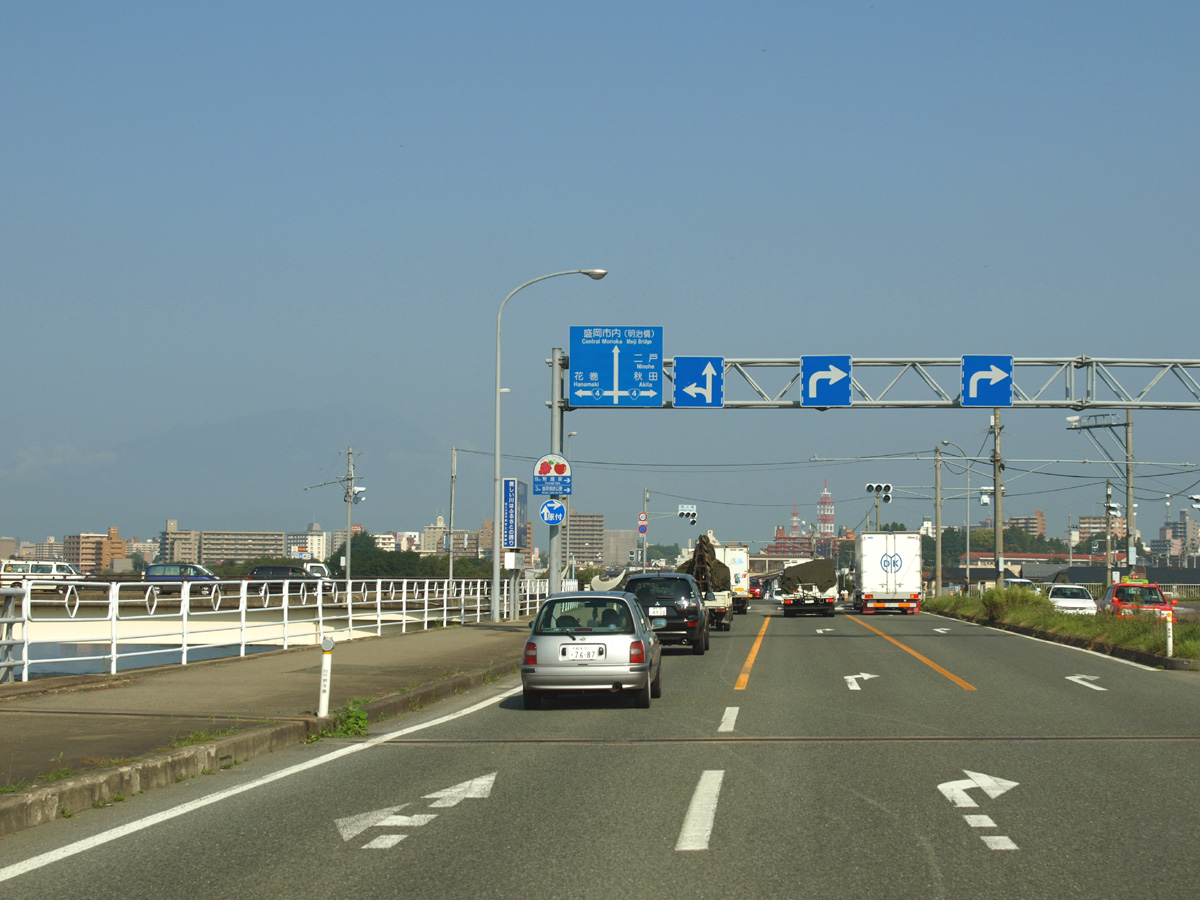
The end of Route 396 where it joins Route 4 in Morioka. Mt. Iwate is in the background to the left.

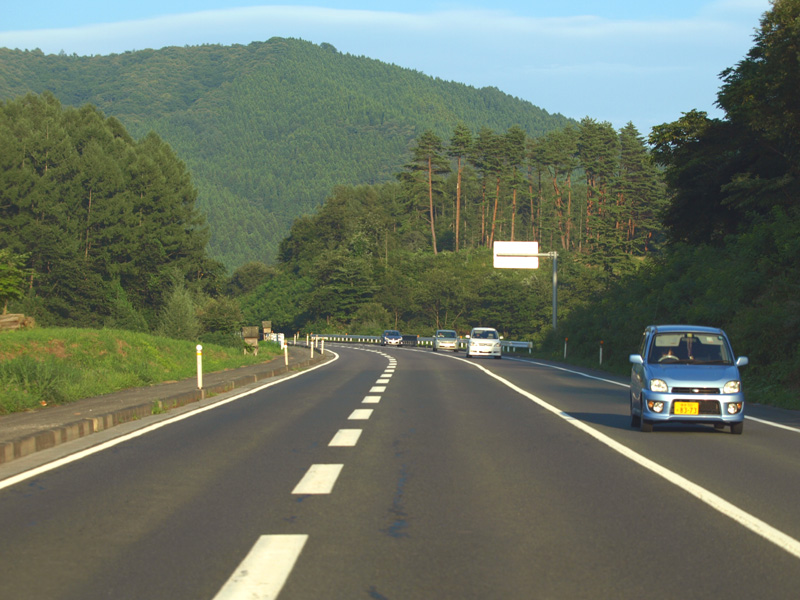
Route 396 heading south up to Kotoge Pass. Notice the added passing lane. Slower traffic is instructed to keep left.

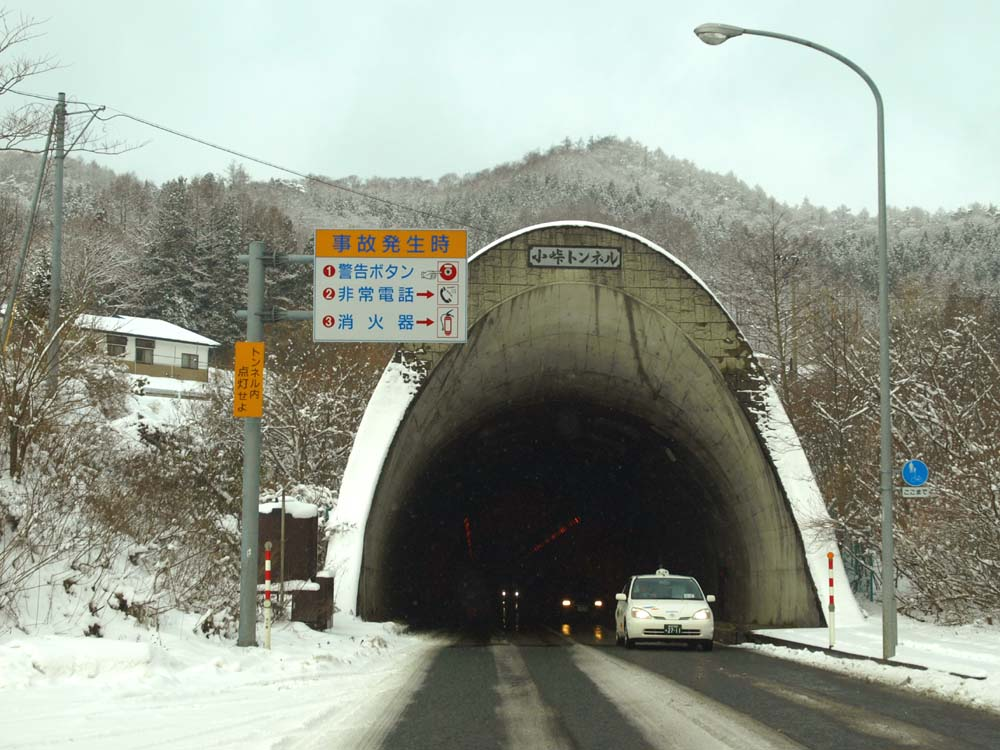
The southern entrance to Kotoge Tunnel in Tono in winter

National Route 396 (国道396号, Kokudō 396-gō) is a national highway of Japan connecting Tōno, Iwate and Morioka, Iwate in Japan, with a total length of 58.7 km (36.47 mi).

== Route description ==
Route 396 is a two-lane highway that winds through the hills of Western Tōno, eastern Hanamaki, eastern Shiwa and enters southern Morioka following the Kitakami River. In the steeper hills of Hanamaki and Tōno, there are generous passing lanes on the uphill stretches going both ways.

In Shiwa, there are fruit and vegetable stands in season along the roadside and several excellent restaurants can be found in and close to Morioka. On the Tōno end, 396 passes the Chiba Family Farmhouse. There is a tunnel approximately one kilometer long in Tōno under the Kotōge Pass.

== Intersections ==
In Tōno, Route 396 begins at National Route 283 in Ayaori. In the Miyamori section of Tōno, there is an intersection with Prefectural Roads 160 and 161. 161 leads to the northeast through Tsukimoushi and 160 leads southwest over the Tase Dam.

In Hanamaki, Route 396 intersects with Prefectural Road 43 at two different places in Ohasama and shares about a half-kilometer of roadway. 43 South leads to Towa while 43 North leads to Lake Hayachine. There is also an intersection with Prefectural Road 102 which goes to Ishidoriya.

In Shiwa, Route 396 intersects with Prefectural Road 228 which joins National Route 456. 396 crosses Prefectural Road 25 near the Shiwa Road Station. 25 West leads to central Shiwa and 25 east leads to Lake Hayachine after a winding and torturous ascent of Arikabe Toge Pass.

In Morioka, Route 396 joins Prefectural Road 208 in two places. 208 West crosses National Route 4 and leads to Yahaba Station. There is also an intersection with Prefectural Road 36. 36 East leads to National Route 106 while 36 West crosses National Route 4 and leads to the Morioka Minami Interchange of the Tōhoku Expressway.
