= Ishidoriya Station =

Railway station in Hanamaki, Iwate Prefecture, Japan

Ishidoriya Station 石鳥谷駅
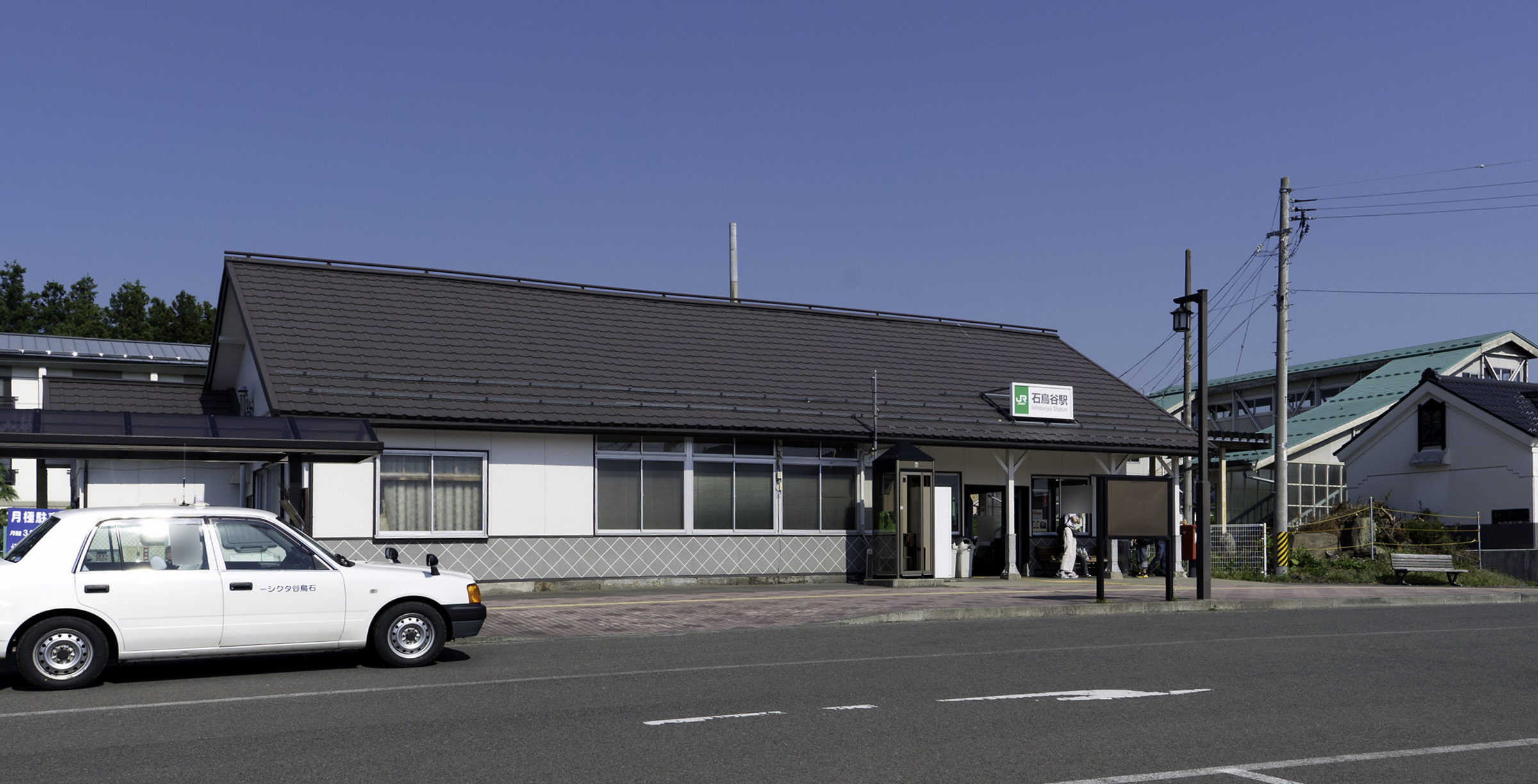
- Ishidoriya Station in May 2015

General information
- Location: Ishidori-cho Kochi dai-7 jiwari 12-7, Hanamaki-shi, Iwate-ken 028-3101; Japan
- Coordinates: 39.4907°N 141.1467°E
- Operator: JR East
- Line: ■ Tōhoku Main Line
- Distance: 511.4 km from Tokyo
- Platforms: 2 side platforms
- Tracks: 2

Construction
- Structure type: At grade

Other information
- Status: Staffed (Midori no Madoguchi )
- Website: Official website

History
- Opened: 15 February 1893

Passengers
- FY2010: 1,083 (daily)

Services
| Preceding station | JR East | Following station |
|---|---|---|
| Hanamaki-Kūkō towards Kuroiso | Tōhoku Main Line Local | Hizume towards Morioka |
Location
- Location within Iwate Prefecture Location within Japan

Ishidoriya Station (石鳥谷駅, Ishidoriya-eki) is a railway station in the city of Hanamaki, Iwate Prefecture, Japan, operated by East Japan Railway Company (JR East).

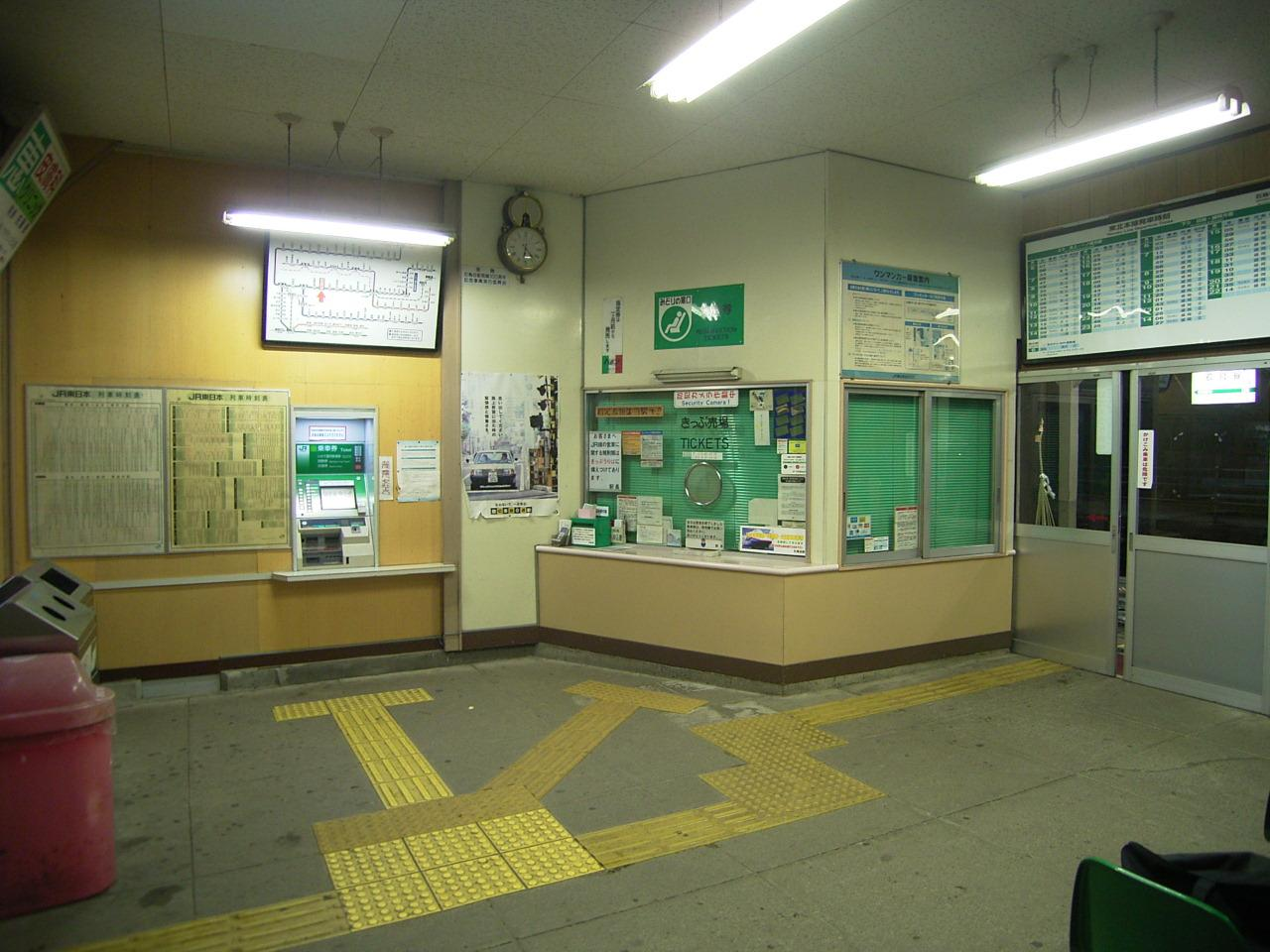
The station ticket office in January 2007

== Lines ==
Ishidoriya Station is served by the Tōhoku Main Line, and is located 511.4 kilometers from the starting point of the line at Tokyo Station.

== Station layout ==
The station has two opposed side platforms, connected to the station building by an overhead passage. The station is staffed and has a Midori no Madoguchi ticket office.

=== Platforms ===
| 1 | ■ Tōhoku Main Line | for Kitakami and Ichinoseki |
| 2 | ■ Tōhoku Main Line | for Morioka |

== History ==
Ishidoriya Station opened on 15 February 1893. The station was absorbed into the JR East network upon the privatization of the Japanese National Railways (JNR) on 1 April 1987.

== Passenger statistics ==
In fiscal 2018, the station was used by an average of 1,083 passengers daily (boarding passengers only).

== Surrounding area ==
- Ishidoriya Post Office
- Former Ishidoriya Town Hall

== See also ==
- List of railway stations in Japan
