= Hienuki District, Iwate =

District in Iwate Prefecture, Japan

- List of Provinces of Japan > Tōsandō > Rikuchū Province > Hienuki District
- Japan > Tōhoku region > Iwate Prefecture > Hienuki District

Hienuki (稗貫郡, Hienuki-gun) was a district located in Iwate Prefecture (formerly Rikuchu Province), Japan. The district had an estimated population of 23,027 and the total area is 365.41 km^{2}.

By the time of founding, the district was co-teminous with the city of Hanamaki.

Until the day before the dissolution (December 31, 2005), there were only two towns left in the district.

- Ishidoriya
- Ōhasama

On January 1, 2006, the towns of Ishidoriya and Ōhasama, and the town of Tōwa (from Waga District) were merged into the expanded city of Hanamaki. Therefore, Hienuki District was dissolved as a result of this merger.

== District Timeline ==
- April 1, 1889 - Due to the municipal status enforcement, the following municipalities were formed. (3 towns, 13 villages)
  - The towns of Hanamaki, Hanamakikawaguchi and Ōhasama
  - The villages of Yumoto, Miyanome, Yuguchi, Ōta, Neko, Yasawa, Uchikawame, Sotokawame, Kamegamori, Kōchi, Niibori, Yaehata and Hachiman
- June 1, 1923 - The town of Hanamakikawaguchi and the village of Neko were merged to form the town of Hanamakikawaguchi. (3 towns, 12 villages)
- April 1, 1928 - The village of Kōchi was elevated to town status and renamed to become the town of Ishidoriya. (4 towns, 11 villages)
- April 10, 1929 - The towns of Hanamaki and Hanamakikawaguchi were merged to create the town of Hanamaki. (3 towns, 11 villages)
- April 1, 1954 - The town of Hanamaki, and the villages of Yumoto, Yuguchi, Yasawa, Ōta and Miyanome were merged to create the city of Hanamaki. (2 towns, 6 villages)
- January 1, 1955 - The town of Ōhasama, and the villages of Uchikawame, Sotokawame and Kamegamori merged to create the town of Ōhasama. (2 towns, 3 villages)
- April 1, 1955 - The town of Ishidoriya, and the villages of Niibori, Yaehata and Hachiman were merged to create the town of Ishidoriya. (2 towns)
- January 1, 2006 - The towns of Ōhasama and Ishidoriya, and the town of Tōwa (from Waga District) were merged into the expanded city of Hanamaki. Hienuki District was dissolved as a result of this merger.

| 明治22年以前 | 明治22年4月1日 | 明治22年 - 大正15年 | 昭和1年 - 昭和19年 | 昭和20年 - 昭和63年 | 平成1年 - 現在 | 現在 |
|---|---|---|---|---|---|---|
| | 花巻町 | 花巻町 | 昭和4年4月10日 花巻町 | 昭和29年4月1日 花巻市 | 平成18年1月1日 花巻市 | 花巻市 |
| | 花巻川口町 | 大正12年6月1日 花巻川口町 | 昭和4年4月10日 花巻町 | 昭和29年4月1日 花巻市 | 平成18年1月1日 花巻市 | 花巻市 |
| | 根子村 | 大正12年6月1日 花巻川口町 | 昭和4年4月10日 花巻町 | 昭和29年4月1日 花巻市 | 平成18年1月1日 花巻市 | 花巻市 |
| | 湯本村 | 湯本村 | 湯本村 | 昭和29年4月1日 花巻市 | 平成18年1月1日 花巻市 | 花巻市 |
| | 湯口村 | 湯口村 | 湯口村 | 昭和29年4月1日 花巻市 | 平成18年1月1日 花巻市 | 花巻市 |
| | 矢沢村 | 矢沢村 | 矢沢村 | 昭和29年4月1日 花巻市 | 平成18年1月1日 花巻市 | 花巻市 |
| | 太田村 | 太田村 | 太田村 | 昭和29年4月1日 花巻市 | 平成18年1月1日 花巻市 | 花巻市 |
| | 宮野目村 | 宮野目村 | 宮野目村 | 昭和29年4月1日 花巻市 | 平成18年1月1日 花巻市 | 花巻市 |
| | 好地村 | 好地村 | 昭和3年4月1日 町制改称 石鳥谷町 | 昭和30年4月1日 石鳥谷町 | 平成18年1月1日 花巻市 | 花巻市 |
| | 新堀村 | 新堀村 | 新堀村 | 昭和30年4月1日 石鳥谷町 | 平成18年1月1日 花巻市 | 花巻市 |
| | 八重畑村 | 八重畑村 | 八重畑村 | 昭和30年4月1日 石鳥谷町 | 平成18年1月1日 花巻市 | 花巻市 |
| | 八幡村 | 八幡村 | 八幡村 | 昭和30年4月1日 石鳥谷町 | 平成18年1月1日 花巻市 | 花巻市 |
| | 大迫町 | 大迫町 | 大迫町 | 昭和30年1月1日 大迫町 | 平成18年1月1日 花巻市 | 花巻市 |
| | 内川目村 | 内川目村 | 内川目村 | 昭和30年1月1日 大迫町 | 平成18年1月1日 花巻市 | 花巻市 |
| | 外川目村 | 外川目村 | 外川目村 | 昭和30年1月1日 大迫町 | 平成18年1月1日 花巻市 | 花巻市 |
| | 亀ヶ森村 | 亀ヶ森村 | 亀ヶ森村 | 昭和30年1月1日 大迫町 | 平成18年1月1日 花巻市 | 花巻市 |

== See also ==
- List of dissolved districts of Japan
