= Hanamaki Airport Station =

Railway station in Hanamaki, Iwate Prefecture, Japan

Hanamaki-Kūkō Station 花巻空港駅
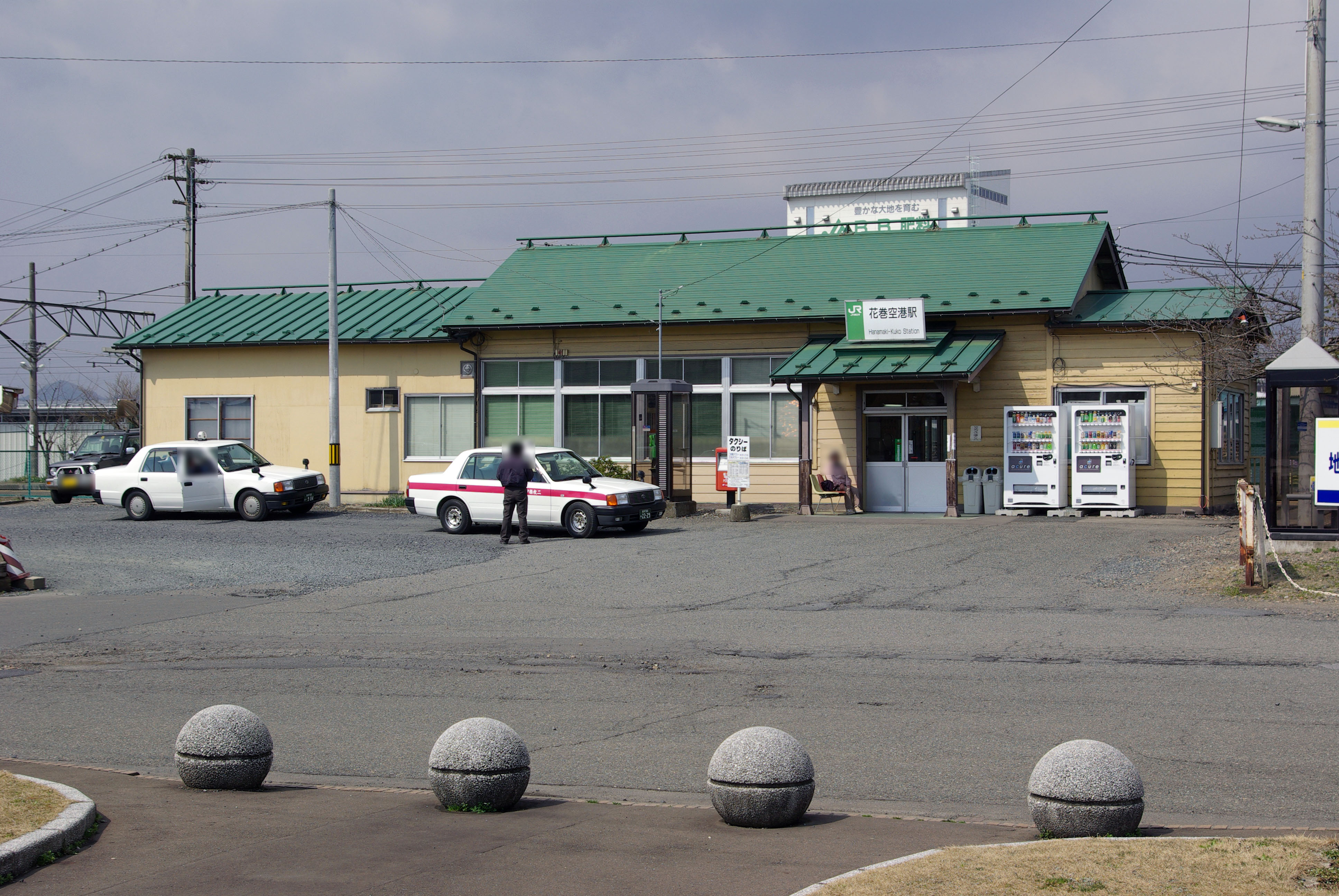
- Hanamaki-Kūkō Station in April 2009

General information
- Location: Nimaibachi dai-5 jiwari 118, Hanamaki-shi, Iwate-ken 025-0312; Japan
- Coordinates: 39.4428°N 141.1278°E
- Operator: JR East; JR Freight
- Line: ■ Tōhoku Main Line
- Distance: 505.7 km from Tokyo
- Platforms: 1 side + 1 island platforms
- Tracks: 3
- Connections: Bus stop; Hanamaki Airport

Construction
- Structure type: At grade

Other information
- Status: Staffed (Midori no Madoguchi )
- Website: Official website

History
- Opened: 15 February 1893
- Former names: Nimaibashi (to 1988)

Passengers
- FY2018: 650 (daily)

Services
Preceding station	JR East	Following station
Hanamaki towards Kuroiso	Tōhoku Main Line Local	Ishidoriya towards Morioka
Location
- Location within Iwate Prefecture Location within Japan

Hanamaki-Kūkō Station (花巻空港駅, Hanamaki Kūkō-eki) is a railway station in the city of Hanamaki, Iwate Prefecture, Japan, operated by East Japan Railway Company (JR East), with a freight terminal operated by the Japan Freight Railway Company (JR Freight).

== Lines ==
Hanamaki-Kūkō is served by the Tōhoku Main Line, and is located 505.7 kilometers from the starting point of the line at Tokyo Station.

== Station layout ==
The station has an island platform and a single side platform, connected to the station building by a footbridge. The station is staffed and has a Midori no Madoguchi ticket office.

=== Platforms ===
1	■ Tōhoku Main Line	for Kitakami and Ichinoseki
2	■ Tōhoku Main Line	(not normally used)
3	■ Tōhoku Main Line	for Morioka

== History ==
The station opened as Nimaibashi Station (二枚橋駅) on 20 November 1932. It was renamed Hanamaki-Kūkō Station on 13 March 1988. The station was absorbed into the JR East network upon the privatization of the Japanese National Railways (JNR) on 1 April 1987.

== Passenger statistics ==
In fiscal 2018, the station was used by an average of 650 passengers daily (boarding passengers only).

== Surrounding area ==
- Hanamaki Airport
- Tōhoku Expressway

== See also ==
- List of railway stations in Japan
