= Tase Dam =

Dam in Iwate Prefecture, Japan

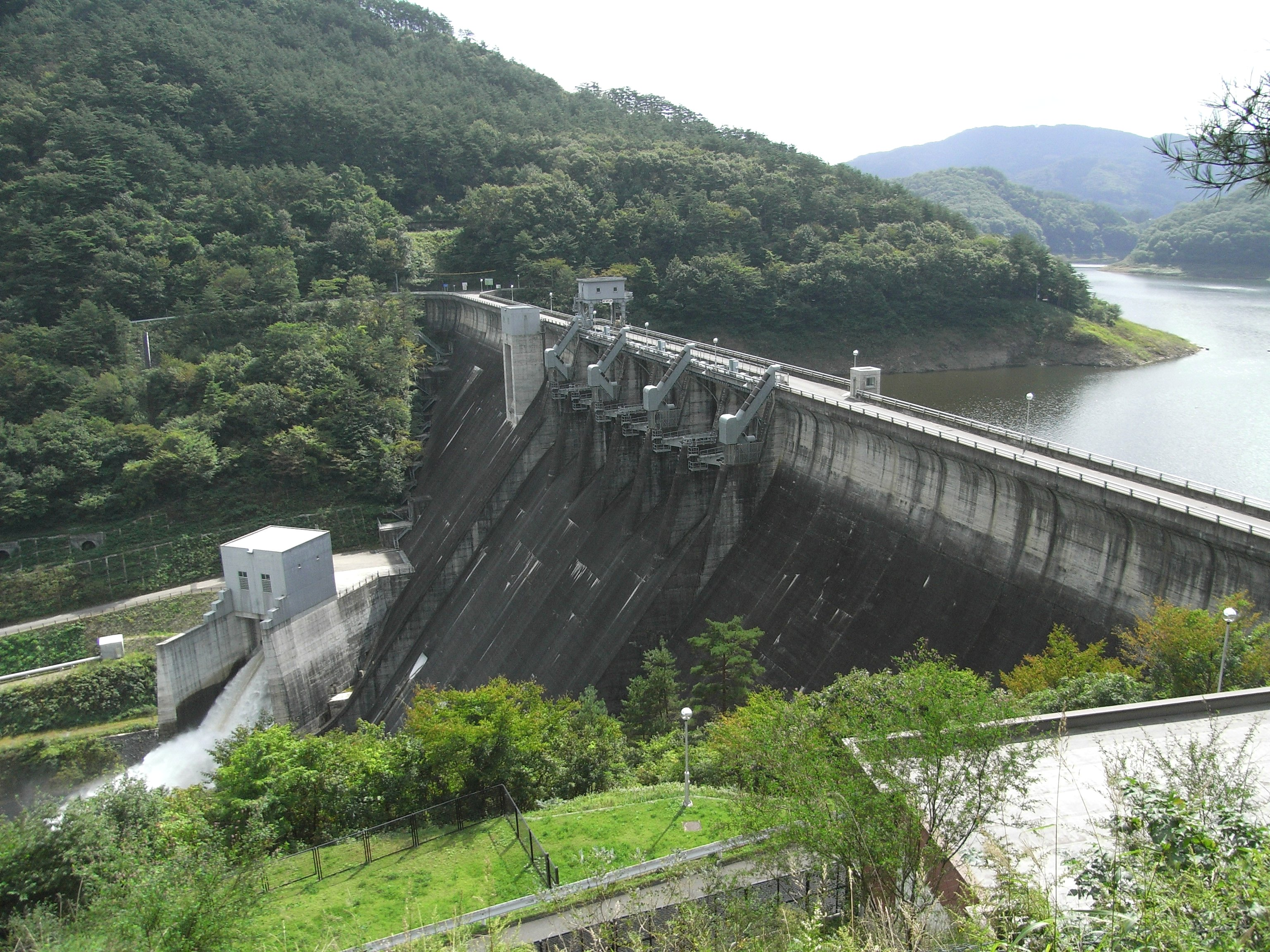
- Tase Dam, September 2007

- Location within Japan
- Official name: 田瀬ダム
- Location: Hanamaki, Iwate, Japan
- Coordinates: 39°20′35″N 141°19′07″E
- Construction began: 1941
- Opening date: 1954
- Owner: Ministry of Land, Infrastructure and Transport

Dam and spillways
- Type of dam: Gravity dam
- Impounds: Sarugaishi River
- Height: 81.5 m (267 ft)
- Length: 320 m (1,050 ft)

Reservoir
- Creates: Lake Tase
- Total capacity: 146,500,000 m^{3}
- Catchment area: 740 km^{2}.
- Surface area: 600 hectares (1,500 acres)

Power Station
- Annual generation: 27,000 KW

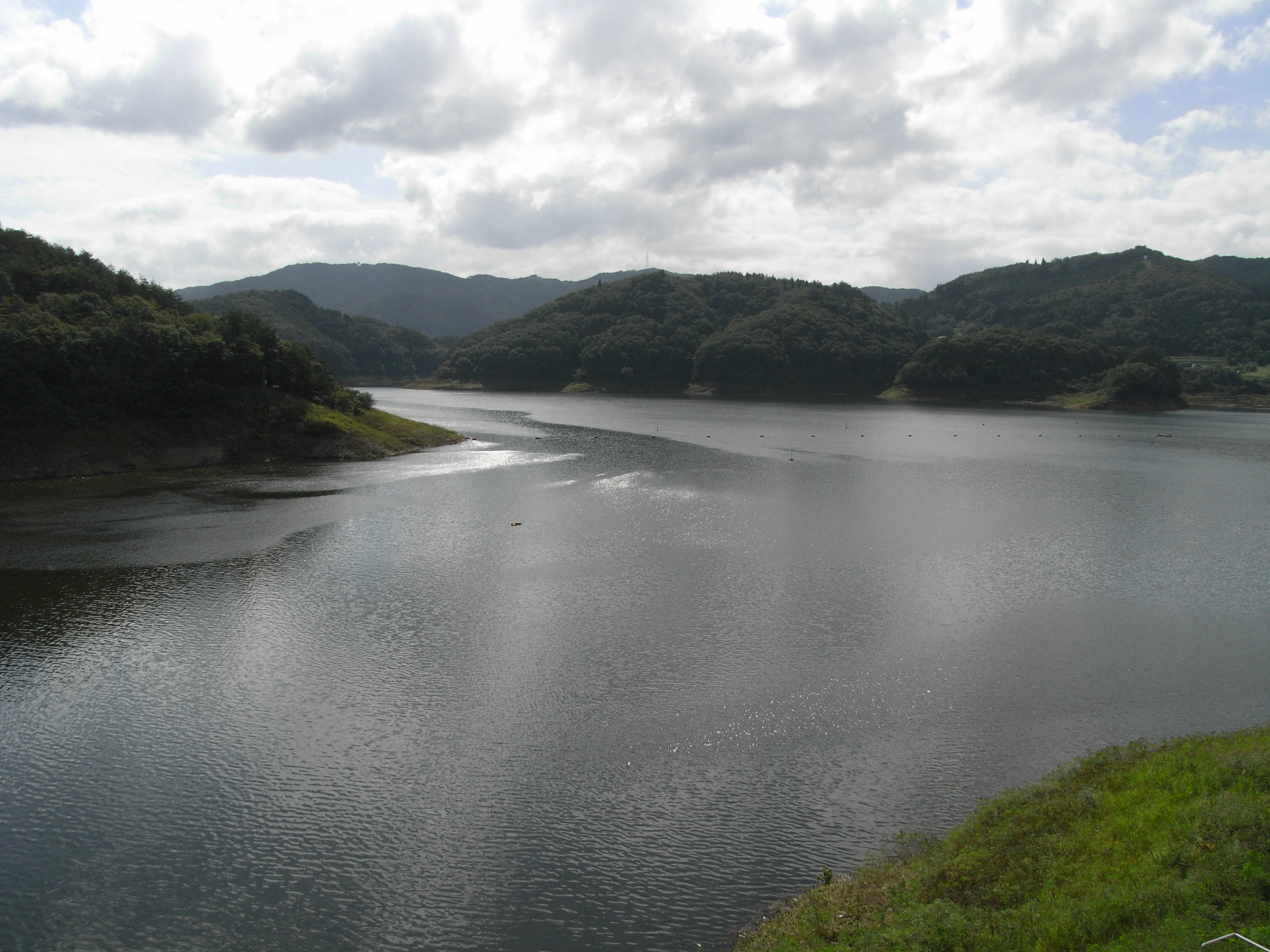
Lake Tase formed by Tase Dam, October 2007

Tase Dam (田瀬ダム, Tase-damu) is a multipurpose dam located on the Sarugaishi River in the former town of Tōwa which is now a part of the city of Hanamaki in Iwate Prefecture, in the Tohoku region of northern Japan. Completed in 1954, it is managed by the Tohoku Regional Development Bureau of the Ministry of Land, Infrastructure and Transport. Located on the Sarugaishi River, a branch of the Kitakami River, it is the first of the dams completed as part of the Kitakami Area Comprehensive Development Plan (KVA). The dam creates Lake Tase (田瀬湖, Tase-ko), a popular sightseeing spot.

== History ==
The lower reaches of the Kitakami River are subject to flooding, especially near its dual mouths at the city of Ichinoseki, Iwate, and plans to increase the river width were impractical due to urbanisation of the area. The Home Ministry, together with Tokyo Imperial University drafted a flood control plan in 1926, which was upgraded in 1938 when implementation began. The plan called for the construction of five large dams on the main stream of the Kitakami River and its major branches. Work on the Tase Dam began in 1941

However, despite the forced relocation of local inhabitants due to the urgent need for hydroelectric power generated by the Tase Dam for the war effort, material and labor shortages during World War II delayed the completion of the dam. Although work resumed immediately after the end of the war, typhoons in 1947 and 1948 created severe damage. Under the 1950 National Land Planning Act promulgated by the Yoshida administration, work on the Tase Dam came under the aegis of the Kitakami Area Comprehensive Development Plan (KVA), which was modelled after the American Tennessee Valley Authority (TVA). Construction on the dam was completed in 1954.

Iwate Prefectural Road 178 passes over the top of the dam. The dam is used for generating electricity, flood prevention, irrigation, and recreation.

== See also ==
- Media related to Tase Dam at Wikimedia Commons
- Tase Dam at Dam Net
