= Ōhasama, Iwate =

Ōhasama 大迫町
- Former municipality
- Flag Emblem

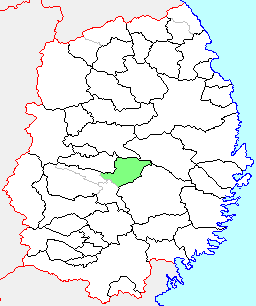
- Location of Ōhasama in Iwate Prefecture

- Location in Japan
- Coordinates: 39°28′N 141°17′E
- Country: Japan
- Region: Tōhoku
- Prefecture: Iwate Prefecture
- District: Hienuki District
- Merged: January 1, 2006 (now part of Hanamaki)

Area
  - Total: 246.84 km^{2} (95.31 sq mi)

Population (January 1, 2006)
  - Total: 6,568
  - Density: 26.6/km^{2} (69/sq mi)
- Time zone: UTC+09:00 (JST)
- Symbols
- Bird: Japanese robin
- Flower: Edelweiss
- Tree: Paulownia tomentosa

Ōhasama (大迫町, Ōhasama-machi) was a town located in Hienuki District, Iwate Prefecture, Japan.

== History ==
The town of Ōhasama created on April 1, 1889, with the establishment of the municipalities system. On January 1, 1955, it annexed the neighboring villages of Kamegamori, Uchikawame and Sotokawame.

On January 1, 2006, Ōhasama, along with the town of Ishidoriya (from Hienuki District), and the town of Tōwa (from Waga District), was merged into the expanded city of Hanamaki (which lies to the south), and no longer exists as an independent municipality.

As of January 1, 2006, the town had an estimated population of 6,568 and a population density of 26.6 persons per km^{2}. The total area was 246.84 km^{2}.

== Geography ==
Ōhasama is located roughly in the center of Iwate Prefecture; about 25 km south of the prefectural capital of Morioka.

Ōhasama is itself composed of four major areas: Ōhasama (大迫) proper, which lies in the center; Uchikawame (内川目), a valley to the north; Sotokawame (外川目), to the east; and to the west is the flatter farmland of Kamegamori (亀々森).

In the northeast section of Ōhasama is Mt. Hayachine (早池峰山) which, at an altitude of 1,917 m. (6,289 ft.), is the second highest mountain in Iwate Prefecture after Mt. Iwate in Morioka.

Ōhasama lies in the mountainous region of the Kitakami River area. This results in a sharp contrast between daytime and nighttime temperatures - most noticeably in the summer. It also receives little snow or rainfall compared to surrounding areas.

== Local Culture ==
The climate of Ōhasama is well suited to the growing of grapes. The town is home to the regionally well-known Edel Wine. In September, the Ōhasama Wine House hosts the annual Wine Festival.

The shrine at Mount Hayachine is famous for a local variety of Kagura (神楽). Kagura dancers often appear at area festivals or functions. On a hill above the town of Ōhasama proper stands a statue resembling the wolf-like costumes donned by Hayachine Kagura dancers.

Mt. Hayachine is also home to a particular species of edelweiss, called Hayachine Usuyukisou, which grows exclusively on the mountain. It was because of this flower that mountain climbers from Ōhasama forged a friendship with those from Berndorf, Austria, resulting in the two becoming sister cities in 1965.

Around the time of Japan's Girls' Festival, Ōhasama puts on displays of its collection of dolls: many of which are several hundred years old. Local history suggests that the dolls may have been given to residents of Ōhasama by travelers from Kyoto on their way to trade in Hokkaidō.

== Sister cities ==
Ōhasama has been twinned with Berndorf, Lower Austria, since 1965. The student exchange programme between Berndorf grammar school and Ōhasama high school will be continued despite the incorporation.

As part of the city of Hanamaki, Ohasama is also twinned with Hot Springs, Arkansas. As of 2007, Ōhasama Junior High School has begun a sister school partnership with Jessieville Middle School in Arkansas, thanks to a friendship forged during a visit to Hanamaki by visitors from the Jessieville School.
