= Hanamaki =

Hanamaki 花巻市
- City
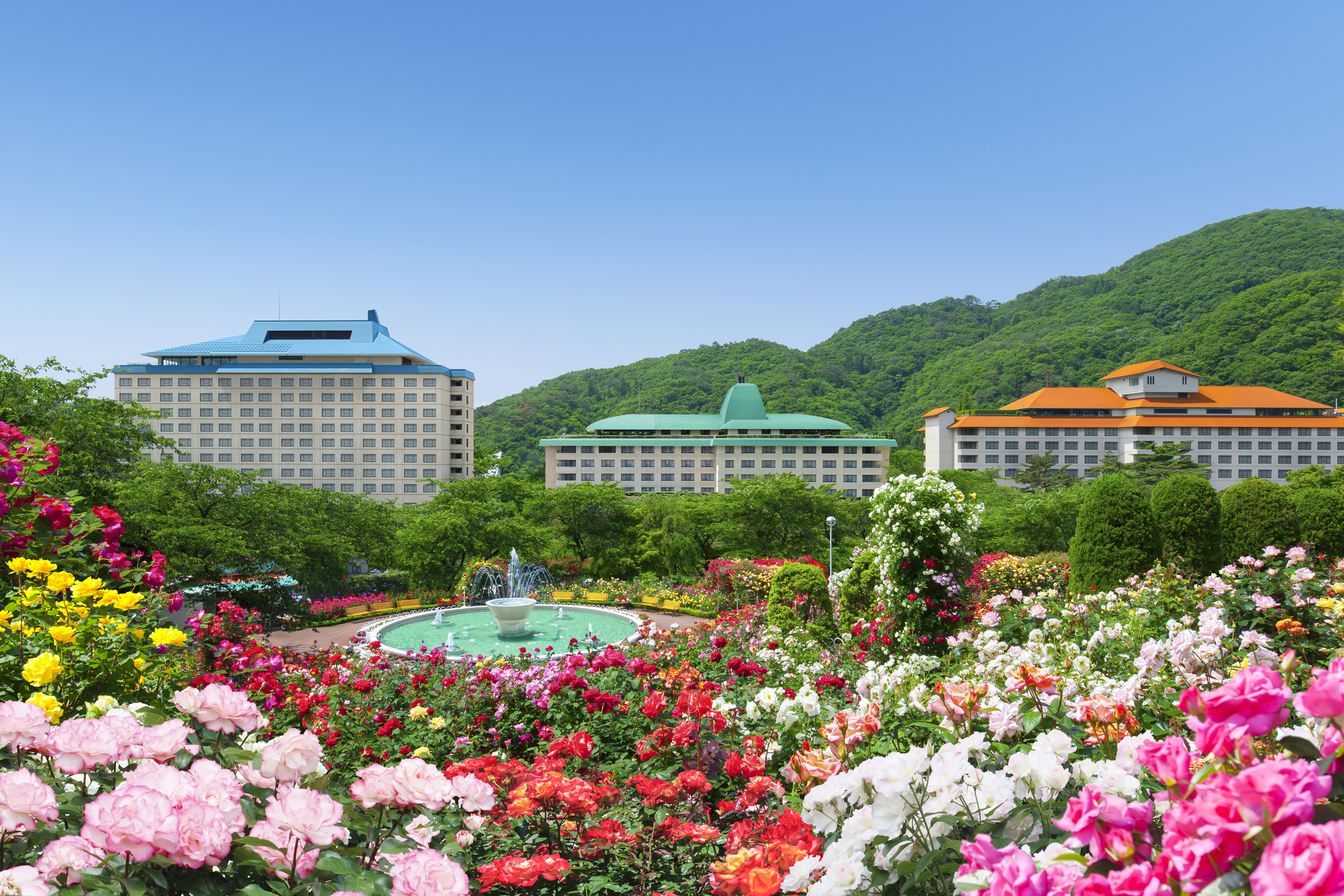
- Hanamaki Onsen

- Flag Seal
- Coordinates: 39°23′19″N 141°7′0.9″E
- Country: Japan
- Region: Tōhoku
- Prefecture: Iwate

Government
  - Mayor: Masaru Obara (小原勝) - from February 2026

Area
  - Total: 908.39 km^{2} (350.73 sq mi)

Population (March 31, 2019)
  - Total: 94,691
  - Density: 104.24/km^{2} (269.98/sq mi)
- Time zone: UTC+9 (Japan Standard Time)
- Phone number: 0198-24-2111
- Address: 9-30 Kajo-cho, Hanamaki-shi, Iwate-ken 025-8601
- Climate: Dfa/Cfa
- Website: Official website
- Symbols
- Bird: Ural owl
- Flower: Hayachina Usukikyo
- Tree: Kobushi

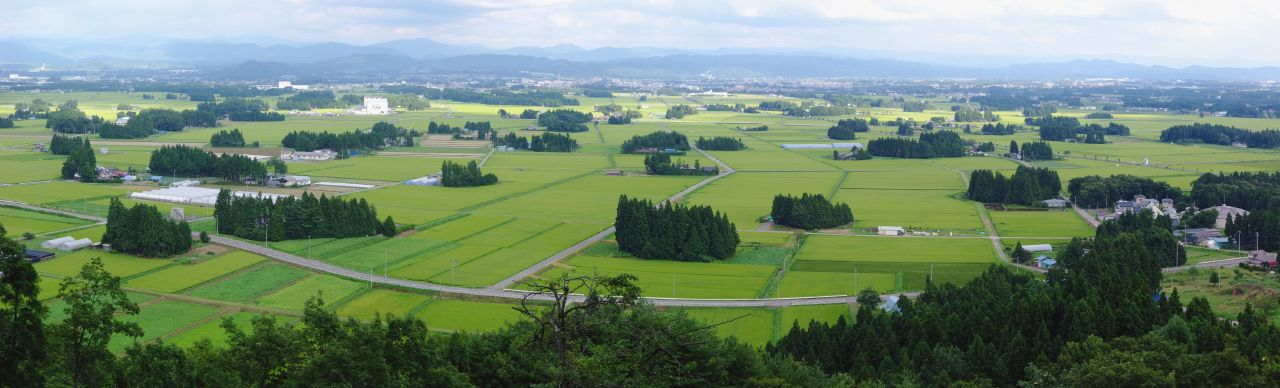
View from Emmanji-kanon

Hanamaki (花巻市, Hanamaki-shi) is a city in Iwate Prefecture, Japan. As of 31 March 2020, the city had an estimated population of 94,691, and a population density of 100 persons per km^{2}, in 37,773 households. The total area of the city is 908.39 square kilometres (350.73 sq mi). Hanamaki is famous as the birthplace of the novelist and poet Kenji Miyazawa and Iwate Prefecture's local specialty, Wanko soba, as well as its hot spring resorts.

== Geography ==
Hanamaki is located in central Iwate Prefecture, in the Kitakami River valley at the conflux of three rivers with the Kitakami River; the Sarugaishi-gawa from the east and the Se-gawa and Toyosawa-gawa from the west. In the west the city rises to the foothills of the Ōu Mountains with the highest peak being Mt. Matsukura at 968 metres (3,176 ft). To the east the city rises to the highest peak in the Kitakami Range, Mount Hayachine at 1,917 metres (6,289 ft). The largest reservoir is Lake Tase on the Sarugaishi River. Lake Hayachine on the Hienuki River is quite spectacular with steep mountains rising above it. Lake Toyosawa is in the western part of the city on the Toyosawa River. Parts of the city are within the borders of the Hayachine Quasi-National Park. A chain of 12 hot springs that lie along the edge of the Ōu Mountains form the Hanamaki Onsenkyo Village.

=== Neighboring municipalities ===
Iwate Prefecture

- Kitakami
- Miyako
- Morioka
- Nishiwaga
- Ōshū
- Shiwa
- Shizukuishi
- Tōno

== Climate ==
Hanamaki has a humid subtropical climate (Köppen climate classification Cfa) characterized by mild summers and cold winters. The average annual temperature in Hanamaki is 10.4 °C (50.7 °F). The average annual rainfall is 1,324 millimetres (52.1 in) with September as the wettest month. The temperatures are highest on average in August, at around 24.0 °C (75.2 °F), and lowest in January, at around −2.3 °C (27.9 °F).

Climate data for Hanamaki (elevation 90 m, 2003–2020 normals, extremes 2003–present)
Month	Jan	Feb	Mar	Apr	May	Jun	Jul	Aug	Sep	Oct	Nov	Dec	Year
Record high °C (°F)	10.3 (50.5)	17.7 (63.9)	22.1 (71.8)	29.3 (84.7)	33.3 (91.9)	34.0 (93.2)	37.6 (99.7)	37.0 (98.6)	35.8 (96.4)	28.9 (84.0)	22.5 (72.5)	17.3 (63.1)	37.6 (99.7)
Mean daily maximum °C (°F)	2.4 (36.3)	3.7 (38.7)	8.4 (47.1)	15.0 (59.0)	21.4 (70.5)	25.1 (77.2)	27.5 (81.5)	29.3 (84.7)	25.2 (77.4)	18.7 (65.7)	11.8 (53.2)	4.9 (40.8)	16.1 (61.0)
Daily mean °C (°F)	−1.8 (28.8)	−0.9 (30.4)	3.0 (37.4)	8.7 (47.7)	15.1 (59.2)	19.5 (67.1)	22.6 (72.7)	24.0 (75.2)	19.7 (67.5)	12.9 (55.2)	6.5 (43.7)	0.8 (33.4)	10.8 (51.4)
Mean daily minimum °C (°F)	−6.4 (20.5)	−5.6 (21.9)	−2.1 (28.2)	2.7 (36.9)	9.3 (48.7)	14.5 (58.1)	18.8 (65.8)	19.9 (67.8)	15.4 (59.7)	7.7 (45.9)	1.6 (34.9)	−3.2 (26.2)	6.1 (43.0)
Record low °C (°F)	−17.5 (0.5)	−18.2 (−0.8)	−11.8 (10.8)	−6.9 (19.6)	−0.6 (30.9)	5.1 (41.2)	10.9 (51.6)	10.5 (50.9)	4.3 (39.7)	−1.6 (29.1)	−10.2 (13.6)	−14.8 (5.4)	−18.2 (−0.8)
Average precipitation mm (inches)	51.7 (2.04)	49.4 (1.94)	80.8 (3.18)	97.6 (3.84)	98.8 (3.89)	120.0 (4.72)	205.0 (8.07)	156.0 (6.14)	156.8 (6.17)	125.3 (4.93)	84.0 (3.31)	85.0 (3.35)	1,310.4 (51.58)
Average precipitation days (≥ 1.0 mm)	10.7	10.1	11.4	10.1	10.3	9.0	13.1	11.4	10.3	10.2	12.7	13.9	133.2
Source: Japan Meteorological Agency (normals 2003–2020, extremes 2003–present)

Climate data for Ōhasama, Hanamaki (elevation 150 m, 1991–2020 normals, extremes 1976–present)
Month	Jan	Feb	Mar	Apr	May	Jun	Jul	Aug	Sep	Oct	Nov	Dec	Year
Record high °C (°F)	12.9 (55.2)	17.4 (63.3)	21.5 (70.7)	28.9 (84.0)	33.8 (92.8)	34.2 (93.6)	37.1 (98.8)	36.4 (97.5)	34.8 (94.6)	29.3 (84.7)	23.7 (74.7)	17.5 (63.5)	37.1 (98.8)
Mean daily maximum °C (°F)	2.1 (35.8)	3.3 (37.9)	7.7 (45.9)	14.8 (58.6)	20.8 (69.4)	24.3 (75.7)	27.4 (81.3)	28.7 (83.7)	24.5 (76.1)	18.2 (64.8)	11.3 (52.3)	4.5 (40.1)	15.7 (60.3)
Daily mean °C (°F)	−2.0 (28.4)	−1.3 (29.7)	2.3 (36.1)	8.4 (47.1)	14.3 (57.7)	18.7 (65.7)	22.4 (72.3)	23.4 (74.1)	19.0 (66.2)	12.3 (54.1)	5.9 (42.6)	0.5 (32.9)	10.4 (50.7)
Mean daily minimum °C (°F)	−6.3 (20.7)	−6.0 (21.2)	−2.7 (27.1)	2.3 (36.1)	8.2 (46.8)	13.6 (56.5)	18.4 (65.1)	19.2 (66.6)	14.7 (58.5)	7.4 (45.3)	1.3 (34.3)	−3.2 (26.2)	5.6 (42.1)
Record low °C (°F)	−17.4 (0.7)	−17.2 (1.0)	−13.0 (8.6)	−6.5 (20.3)	−1.4 (29.5)	3.5 (38.3)	7.5 (45.5)	9.2 (48.6)	2.1 (35.8)	−1.6 (29.1)	−7.7 (18.1)	−15.5 (4.1)	−17.4 (0.7)
Average precipitation mm (inches)	46.4 (1.83)	39.8 (1.57)	77.0 (3.03)	84.7 (3.33)	108.6 (4.28)	111.6 (4.39)	176.6 (6.95)	160.0 (6.30)	150.0 (5.91)	111.1 (4.37)	81.2 (3.20)	65.8 (2.59)	1,212.8 (47.75)
Average precipitation days (≥ 1.0 mm)	10.7	9.1	11.4	11.0	11.1	9.8	13.5	11.1	11.5	11.3	12.3	12.1	134.4
Mean monthly sunshine hours	83.0	104.9	136.5	161.2	172.1	148.3	125.6	148.1	126.7	135.8	105.1	69.7	1,517
Source: Japan Meteorological Agency (normals 1991–2020, extremes 1976–present)

== Demographics ==
Per Japanese census data, the population of Hanamaki peaked at around the year 2000 and has declined since.

Historical population
Year	Pop.	±%
1920	69,110	—
1930	79,108	+14.5%
1940	83,401	+5.4%
1950	102,933	+23.4%
1960	105,687	+2.7%
1970	101,858	−3.6%
1980	105,678	+3.8%
1990	106,727	+1.0%
2000	107,175	+0.4%
2010	101,451	−5.3%
2020	93,193	−8.1%

== History ==
The area of present-day Hanamaki was part of ancient Mutsu Province, and has been settled since at least the Jōmon period. During the Sengoku period, the area was dominated by various samurai clans before coming under the control of the Nambu clan during the Edo period, who ruled Morioka Domain under the Tokugawa shogunate. The town developed as a post station on the Ōshū Kaidō highway during the Edo period.

In the Meiji period, with the establishment of the modern municipalities system on April 1, 1889, the modern towns of Hanamaki and Hanamaki-Kawaguchi were created within Hienuki District, Iwate. The two towns were merged on April 10, 1929, with the merged municipality retaining the name of Hanamaki. On April 1, 1954, the villages of Yuguchi, Yumoto, Miyanome, Yasawa and Ohta were annexed by Hanamaki. An additional village, Sasama, joined the following year.

In January 2006, Hanamaki merged with the towns of Ishidoriya, Ōhasama, thus dissolving Hienuki District, and with the town of Tōwa from Waga District.

== Government ==
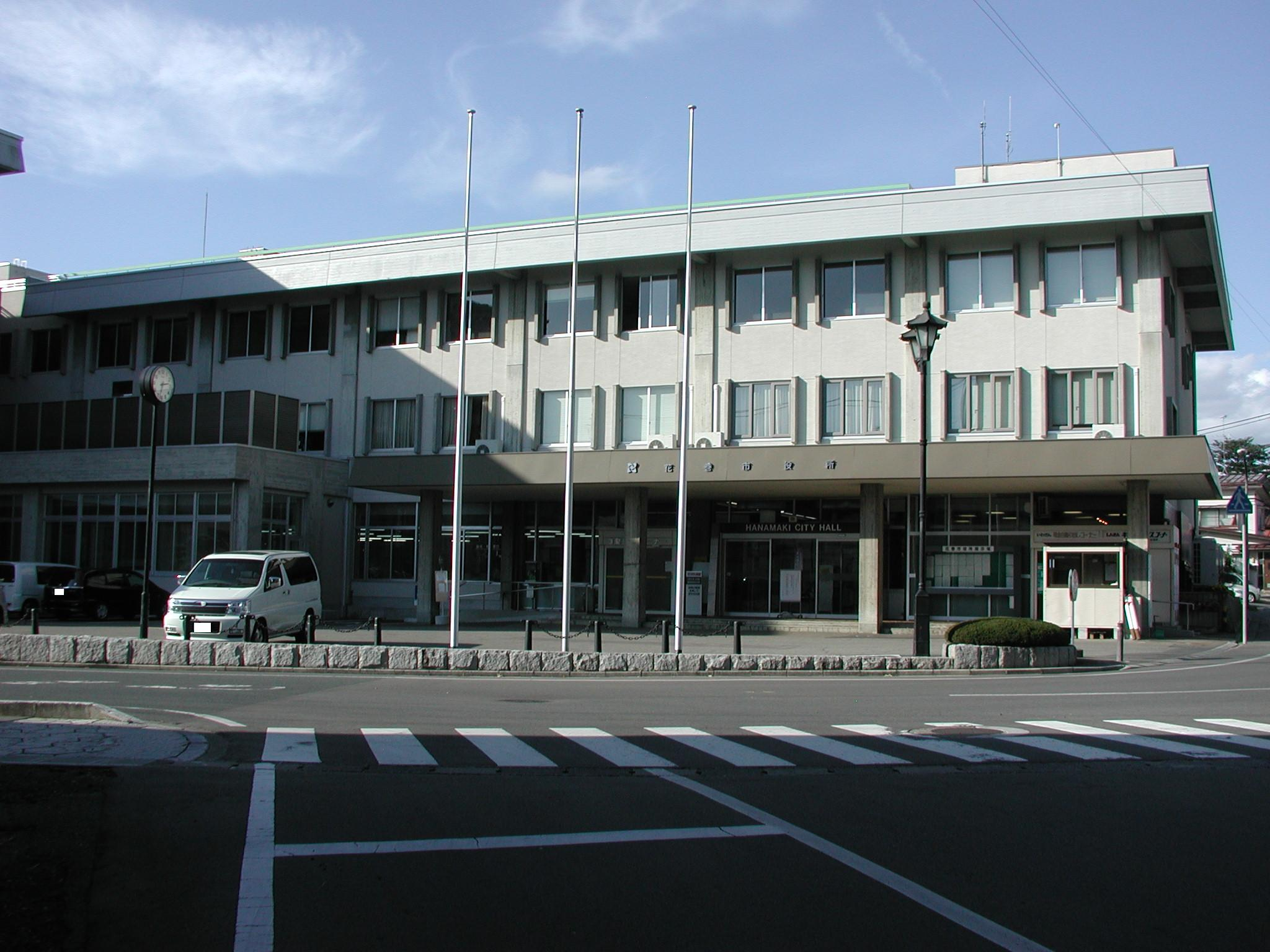
Hanamaki City Hall

Hanamaki has a mayor-council form of government with a directly elected mayor and a unicameral city legislature of 25 members. Hanamaki contributes four seats to the Iwate Prefectural legislature. In terms of national politics, the city is part of Iwate 3rd district of the lower house of the Diet of Japan.

== Economy ==
Agriculture, notably dairy farming dominates the local economy. Hanamaki is also noted for electrical appliances. The area is also noted for its many onsen (hot spring) resorts.

== Education ==
Fuji University, a private university, is located in Hanamaki.

The city government operates 19 public elementary schools and 11 public junior high schools. There are seven public high schools operated by the Iwate Prefectural Board of Education. The prefecture also operates one special education school.

== Transportation ==
=== Railway ===
East Japan Railway Company (JR East) - Tōhoku Shinkansen

- Shin-Hanamaki

East Japan Railway Company (JR East) - Tōhoku Main Line

- Hanamaki - Hanamaki Airport - Ishidoriya

East Japan Railway Company (JR East) - Kamaishi Line

- Shin-Hanamaki - Oyamada - Tsuchizawa - Haruyama

=== Highway ===
- Tōhoku Expressway – Hanamaki Parking Area – Hanamaki-minami Interchange – Hanamaki Junction – Hanamaki Interchange
- Kamaishi Expressway – Hanamaki Junction – Hanamaki Airport Interchange – Tōwa Interchange
- National Route 4
- National Route 107
- National Route 283
- National Route 396
- National Route 456

=== Airport ===
- Hanamaki Airport

== Local attractions ==
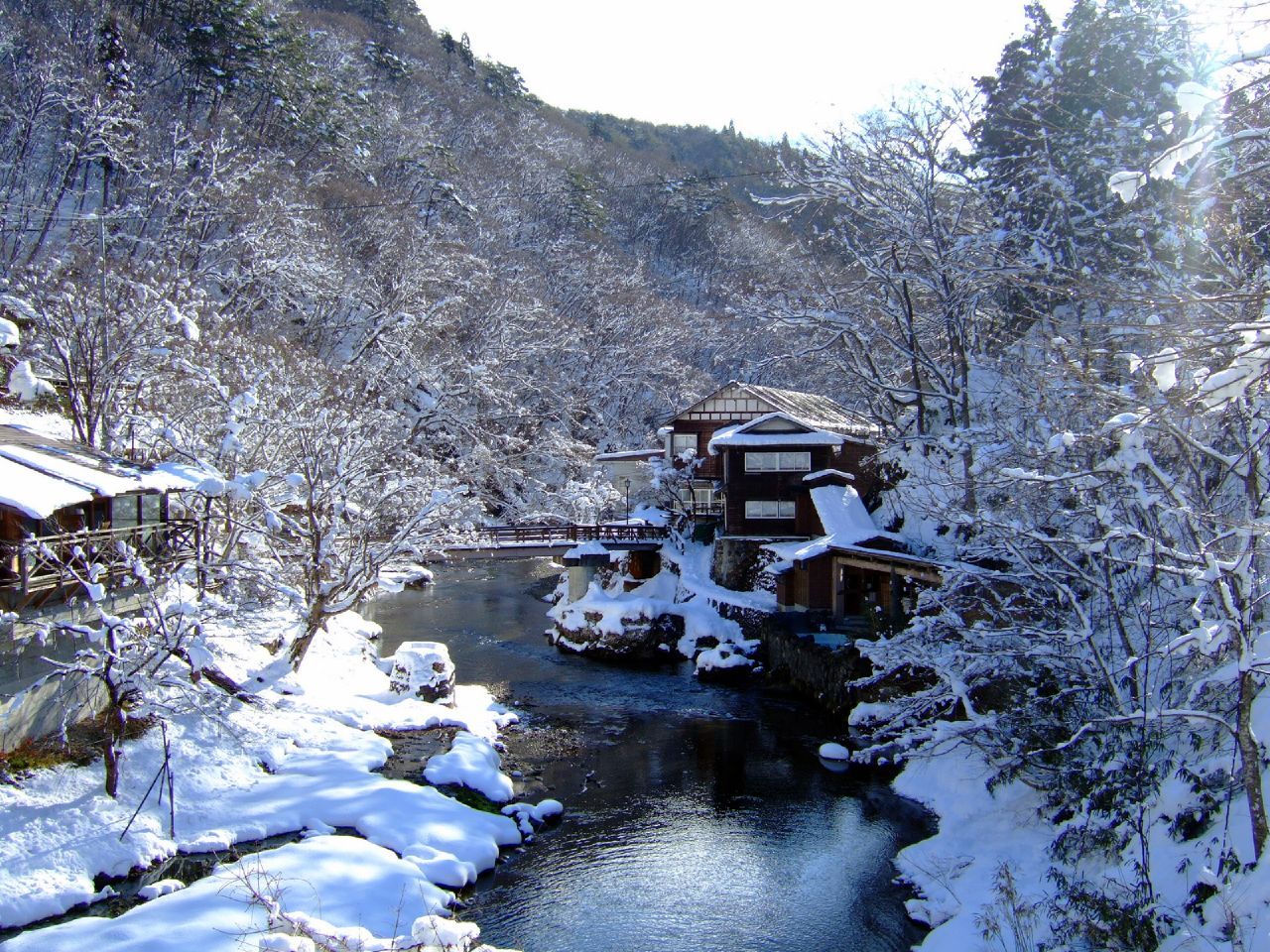
Osawa Onsen

Hanamaki is known historically for its many onsen (hot springs). Kenji Miyazawa's various legacies are the old Hanamaki city's other perennial tourist attraction; notably the Miyazawa Kenji Memorial Museum features several exhibitions related to his life and works. The city also has a ski slope.

One of Hanamaki's most notable events is the Hanamaki Matsuri, an annual festival which takes place the second weekend of September and dates back to 1593. The three-day festivities include a dance of over one thousand synchronized traditional dancers; the carrying of over one hundred small shrines; and the parading of a dozen or so large, hand-constructed floats depicting historical, fictional, or mythical scenes and accompanied by drummers, flautists, and lantern-carriers. Of these dances, the most famous is Shishi Odori (dance of the deer). This dance involves men dressing as deer and banging drums.

With the city's recent mergers, Hanamaki now lays claim to its absorbed towns' attractions. Ōhasama is famous for local varieties of traditional Kagura dance. Kagura dancers often appear at area festivals or functions. On a hill above the town of Ōhasama proper stands a statue resembling the wolf-like costumes donned by Hayachine Kagura dancers. Mt. Hayachine, which at 1917 m (6289 ft) is the second highest mountain in Iwate Prefecture, lies in the northeast section of Ōhasama. The area is home to the regionally well-known Edel Wine. In September, the Ōhasama Wine House hosts the annual Wine Festival. Around the time of Japan's Girls' Festival, Ōhasama puts on displays of its collection of dolls, many of which are several hundred years old. Local history suggests that the dolls may have been given to residents of Ōhasama by travelers from Kyoto on their way to trade in Hokkaido. Ishidoriya has a history of brewing sake connected with the Nambu Toji tradition.

== International relations ==
- Berndorf, Austria, since 1965
- Rutland, Vermont, United States, since October 8, 1986
- Hot Springs, Arkansas, United States, since January 15, 1993
- Xigang District, Dalian, Liaoning, China, friendship city since 2010

Each of the former towns merged with Hanamaki also conducted exchanges on their own, most of which have been taken up by the new Hanamaki city. Ōhasama was paired Berndorf. Mt. Hayachine is home to a particular species of edelweiss, called Hayachine Usuyukiso, which grows exclusively on Mt. Hayachine. It was because of this flower that mountain climbers from Ōhasama forged a friendship with those from Berndorf, Lower Austria. Ishidoriya was paired with Rutland, Vermont.

== Notable people from Hanamaki ==
- El Samurai, professional wrestler
- Kazuhiro Hatakeyama, professional baseball player
- Tetsugoro Yorozu, painter
- Koi Ikeno, manga artist
- Masanori Ito (music critic)
- Shunkichi Kikuchi, photographer
- Kenji Miyazawa, writer
- Shohei Ohtani, professional baseball player
