= Tōwa, Iwate =

Tōwa 東和町
- Former municipality
- Flag Emblem

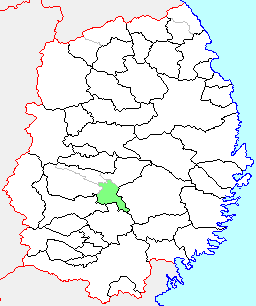
- Location of Tōwa in Iwate Prefecture

- Location in Japan
- Coordinates: 39°23′13.2″N 141°13′41.5″E
- Country: Japan
- Region: Tōhoku
- Prefecture: Iwate Prefecture
- District: Waga District
- Merged: January 1, 2006 (now part of Hanamaki)

Area
  - Total: 157.51 km^{2} (60.81 sq mi)

Population (January 1, 2006)
  - Total: 10,027
  - Density: 63.66/km^{2} (164.9/sq mi)
- Time zone: UTC+09:00 (JST)
- Symbols
- Bird: Green pheasant
- Flower: Iris sanguinea
- Tree: Pinus densiflora

Tōwa (東和町, Tōwa-chō) was a town located in Waga District, Iwate Prefecture, Japan.

== History ==
The town of Tōwa created on January 1, 1955 within Waga District by the merger of the villages of Tsuchizawa, Taninai and Nakanai.

On January 1, 2006, Tōwa, along with the towns of Ishidoriya and Ōhasama (both from Hienuki District), was merged into the expanded city of Hanamaki, and no longer exists as an independent municipality.

As of January 1, 2006, the town had an estimated population of 10,027 and a population density of 63.66 persons per km². The total area was 157.51 km².
