= Esashi District, Iwate =

Former district in Iwate prefecture, Japan

Esashi (江刺郡, Esashi-gun) was a district located in Iwate Prefecture, Japan.

== Timeline ==
- April 1, 1889 - Due to the municipal status enforcement, the following municipalities were formed. (1 town, 12 villages)
  - The town of Iwayadō, the villages of Tawara, Fujisato, Ide, Yonesato, Tamasato, Yanagawa, Hirose, Inase, Odaki, Kuroishi and Hada (now part of the city of Ōshū)
  - The village of Fukuoka (now part of the city of Kitakami)
- April 1, 1954 (1 town, 9 villages)
  - The villages of Kuroishi and Hada were merged with the town of Mizusawa, and the villages of Anetai, Shinjō and Sakurakawa (all from Isawa District) to create the city of Mizusawa.
  - The village of Fukuoka was merged with the town of Kurosawaji, and the villages of Iitoyo, Futago, Saraki and Oniyanagi (all from Waga District), and the village of Aisari (from Isawa District) to create the city of Kitakami.
- February 10, 1955 - The town of Iwayadō, and the villages of Tawara, Fujisato, Ide, Yonesato, Tamasato, Yanagawa, Hirose, Inase and Odaki were merged to create the town of Esashi. (1 town)
- November 3, 1958 - The town of Esashi was elevated to city status to become the city of Esashi. Esashi District was dissolved as a result of this merger.

明治22年以前	明治22年4月1日	明治22年 - 昭和19年	昭和20年 - 昭和64年		平成1年 - 現在	現在
	岩谷堂町	岩谷堂町	昭和30年2月10日 江刺町	昭和33年11月3日 市制	平成18年2月20日 奥州市の一部	奥州市
	田原村	田原村	昭和30年2月10日 江刺町	昭和33年11月3日 市制	平成18年2月20日 奥州市の一部	奥州市
	藤里村	藤里村	昭和30年2月10日 江刺町	昭和33年11月3日 市制	平成18年2月20日 奥州市の一部	奥州市
	伊手村	伊手村	昭和30年2月10日 江刺町	昭和33年11月3日 市制	平成18年2月20日 奥州市の一部	奥州市
	米里村	米里村	昭和30年2月10日 江刺町	昭和33年11月3日 市制	平成18年2月20日 奥州市の一部	奥州市
	玉里村	玉里村	昭和30年2月10日 江刺町	昭和33年11月3日 市制	平成18年2月20日 奥州市の一部	奥州市
	梁川村	梁川村	昭和30年2月10日 江刺町	昭和33年11月3日 市制	平成18年2月20日 奥州市の一部	奥州市
	広瀬村	広瀬村	昭和30年2月10日 江刺町	昭和33年11月3日 市制	平成18年2月20日 奥州市の一部	奥州市
	稲瀬村	稲瀬村	昭和30年2月10日 江刺町	昭和33年11月3日 市制	平成18年2月20日 奥州市の一部	奥州市
	愛宕村	愛宕村	昭和30年2月10日 江刺町	昭和33年11月3日 市制	平成18年2月20日 奥州市の一部	奥州市
	黒石村	黒石村	昭和29年4月1日 水沢市の一部		平成18年2月20日 奥州市の一部	奥州市
	羽田村	羽田村	昭和29年4月1日 水沢市の一部		平成18年2月20日 奥州市の一部	奥州市
	福岡村	福岡村	昭和29年4月1日 北上市の一部			北上市

== See also ==
- List of dissolved districts of Japan
