= Waga District, Iwate =

District in Iwate prefecture, Japan

Coordinates: 39.437°N 140.776°E

- List of Provinces of Japan > Tōsandō > Rikuchū Province > Waga District
- Japan > Tōhoku region > Iwate Prefecture > Waga District

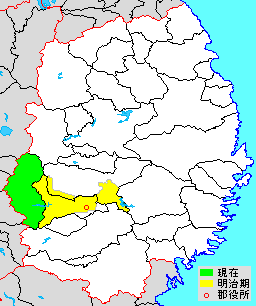
Map showing original extent of Waga District in Iwate Prefecture colored area=original extent in Meiji period; green=present area

Location of Waga District in Iwate Prefecture.

Waga (和賀郡, Waga-gun) is a rural district in Iwate Prefecture, in the Tōhoku region of northern Japan.

As of 1 June 2019, the district had an estimated population of 5,315, and a population density of 9 persons per km^{2}. The total area is 590.74 km^{2}. Parts of the cities of Kitakami, Hanamaki, and the town of Kanegasaki were formerly within the district. Since 2006, the district has been contiguous with just the town of Nishiwaga.

== History ==
During the Edo period under the Tokugawa shogunate, the district was within Mutsu Province and was under the control of the Nanbu clan of Morioka Domain. In 1869, following the Meiji restoration, Mutsu Province was divided, with the area of Waga District becoming part of Rikuchū Province, and from 1872, part of Iwate Prefecture.

In 1878, with the establishment of the municipalities, Waga District was administratively divided into 69 villages. On January 4, 1879, the District was divided into Higashiwaga (62 villages) and Nishiwaga (7 villages).

However, on April 1, 1897, the two districts were merged and reorganized into one town (Kurosawajiri) and 16 villages, with the village of Aisari transferred to Isawa District.

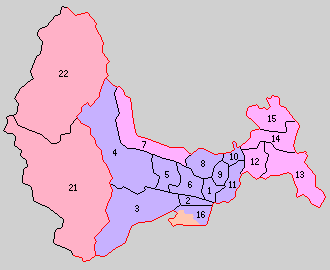
1. Kurosawajiri; 2. Oniyanagi; 3.Iwasaki 4. Yokokawame; 5. Fujine; 6. Ezuriko; 7. Sasama; 8. Iitoyo; 9. Futago: 10. Saraki; 11. Tachibana; 12. Nakanai; 13. Taninai; 14. Junikabura; 15. Oyamada; 21. Yuda; 22. Sawauchi; Blue = Kitakami City; Pink = Hanamaki City; Orange = Nishiwaga Town; 16=Transfer to Isawa District

=== former Higashiwaga District ===
- Kurosawajiri
- Sasama
- Tachibana
- Iitoyo
- Futago
- Saraki
- Oniyanagi
- Junikabura
- Nakanai
- Oyamada
- Taninai
- Iwasaki
- Yokokawame
- Fujine
- Ezuriko
- Aisari

=== former Nishiwaga District ===
- Yuda
- Sawauchi

=== Subsequent history ===
- December 25, 1940 - The village of Junikabura was renamed and gained town status to become the town of Tsuchizawa. (2 towns, 15 villages)
- January 1, 1954 - The village of Tachibana merged into the town of Kurosawajiri. (2 towns, 14 villages)
- April 1, 1954 - The town of Kurosawajiri and the villages of Iitoyo, Futago, Saraki, and Oniyanagi merged with the village of Aisari from Isawa District and the village of Fukuoka from Esashi District to form the city of Kitakami. (1 town, 10 villages)
- January 1, 1955 - The town of Tsuchizawa and the villages of Nakanai, Oyamada, and Taninai merged to form the town of Tōwa. (1 town, 7 villages)
- April 1, 1955 - The villages of Iwasaki, Yokokawame, and Fujine merged to form the village of Waga. (1 town, 5 villages)
- July 1, 1955 - The village of Sasama merged into the city of Hanamaki. (1 town, 4 villages)
- April 1, 1956 - The village of Waga gained town status to become the town of Waga. (2 towns, 3 villages)
- August 1, 1964 - The village of Yuda gained town status to become the town of Yuda. (3 towns, 2 villages)
- April 1, 1991 - The towns of Waga and the village of Ezuriko merged with the city of Kitakami. (2 towns, 1 village)
- November 1, 2005 - The town of Yuda and the village of Sawauchi merged to form the town of Nishiwaga. (2 towns)
- January 1, 2006 - The town of Tōwa merged with the towns of Ishidoriya and Ōhasama from Hienuki District with the city of Hanamaki. (1 town)
