= Hayachine Quasi-National Park =

Quasi-national park in Iwate prefecture, Japan

- 早池峰国定公園
- IUCN category II (national park)
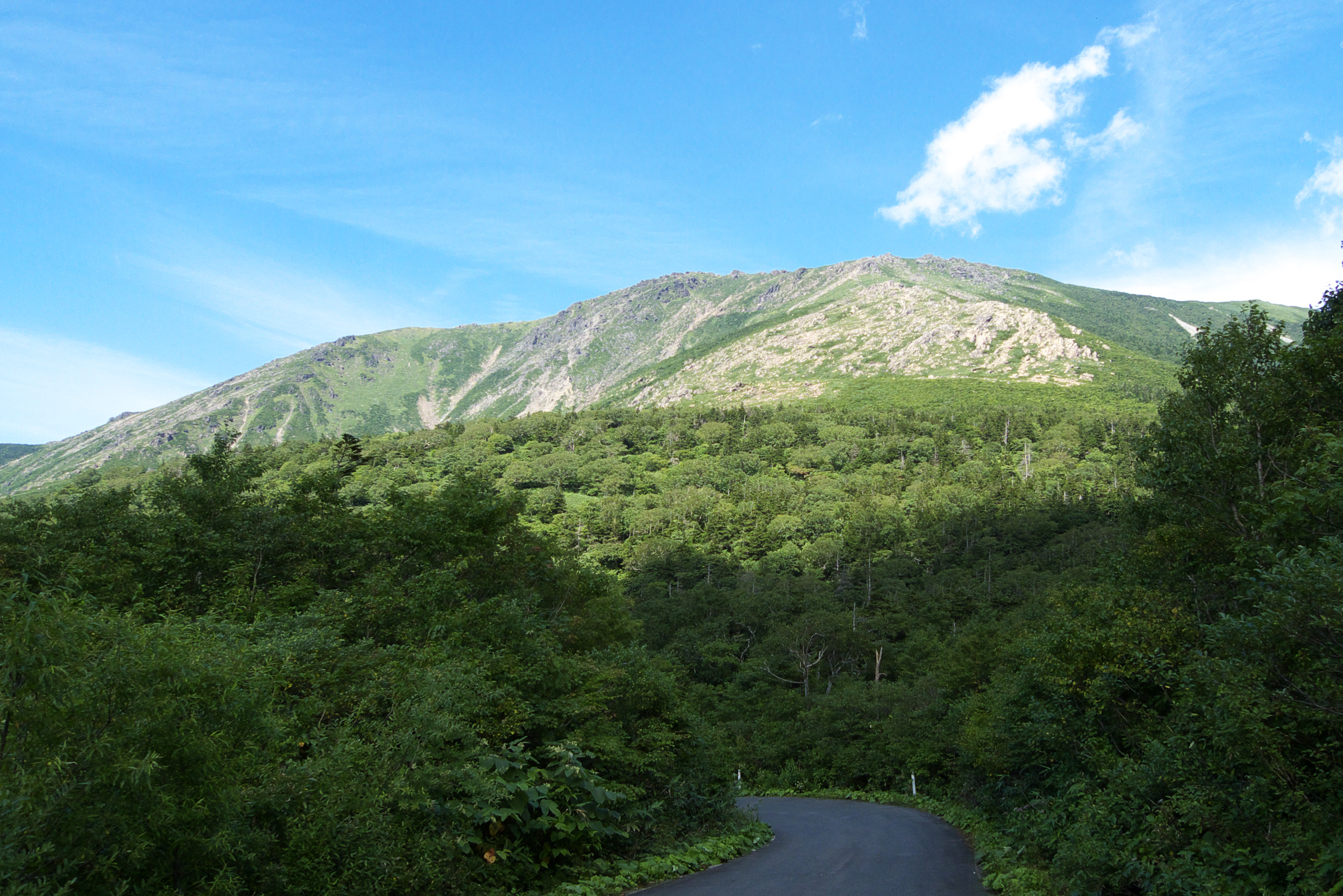
- Mount Hayachine (1,914 m)

- Location within Iwate Prefecture Location within Japan
- Location: Iwate Prefecture, Japan
- Coordinates: 39°30′32″N 141°29′35″E
- Area: 54.63 km^{2} (21.09 sq mi)
- Established: 10 June 1982

Hayachine Quasi-National Park (早池峰国定公園, Hayachine Kokutei Kōen) is a quasi-national park in central Iwate Prefecture, in the Tōhoku region of northern Japan. It is rated a protected landscape (category II) according to the IUCN.

Established in 1982, the park's central features are Mount Hayachine (1,914 m (6,280 ft)) and Mount Yakushi (薬師岳) (1,645 m (5,397 ft)). The alpine zone and forest vegetation of Mounts Hayachine and Yakushi is a designated Special Natural Monument spanning the municipalities of Hanamaki, Tōno, and Miyako (former village of Kawai). The area is celebrated for its flora and also for its place in Japanese folklore, most notably as collected in Tōno Monogatari.

Like all Quasi-National Parks in Japan, Hayachine Quasi-National Park is managed by the local prefectural government.

== See also ==
- National Parks of Japan
- List of Special Places of Scenic Beauty, Special Historic Sites and Special Natural Monuments
