= Kitakami Mountains =

Mountain range in northeastern Honshū

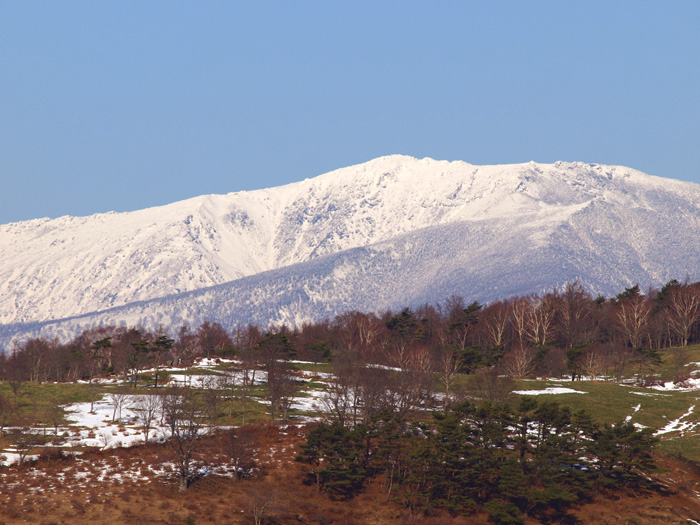
- Mt Hayachine

Highest point
- Peak: Mount Hayachine
- Elevation: 1,913.6 m (6,278 ft)
- Coordinates: 39°33′30″N 141°29′20″E

Dimensions
- Length: 250 km (160 mi) N–S
- Width: 80 km (50 mi) E–W

Naming
- Native name: 北上山地 (Japanese)

Geography
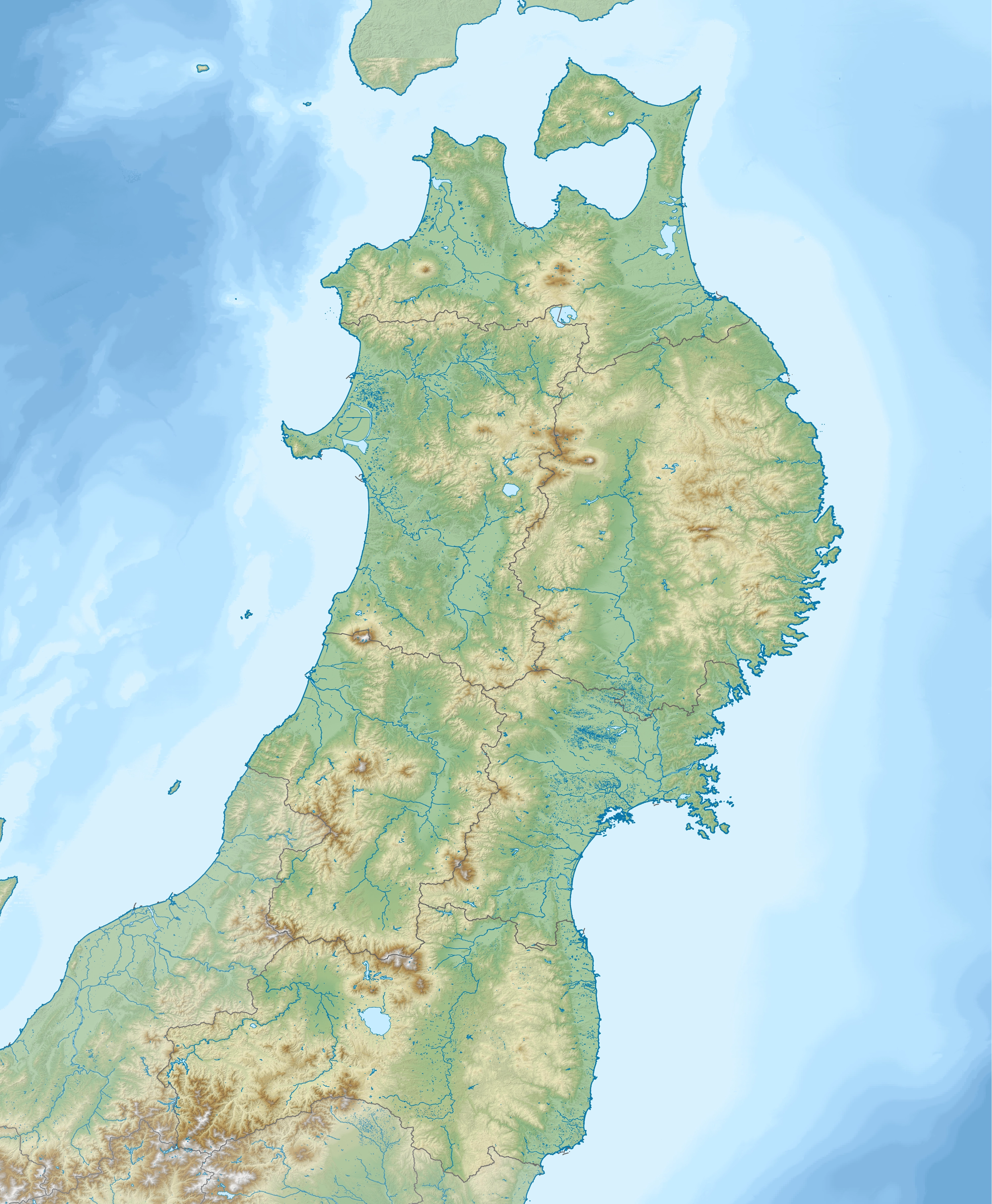
- Location within Tohoku, Japan
- Country: Japan
- Island: Honshu
- Region: Tōhoku
- Prefectures: Aomori, Iwate and Miyagi
- Range coordinates: 39°30′N 141°30′E

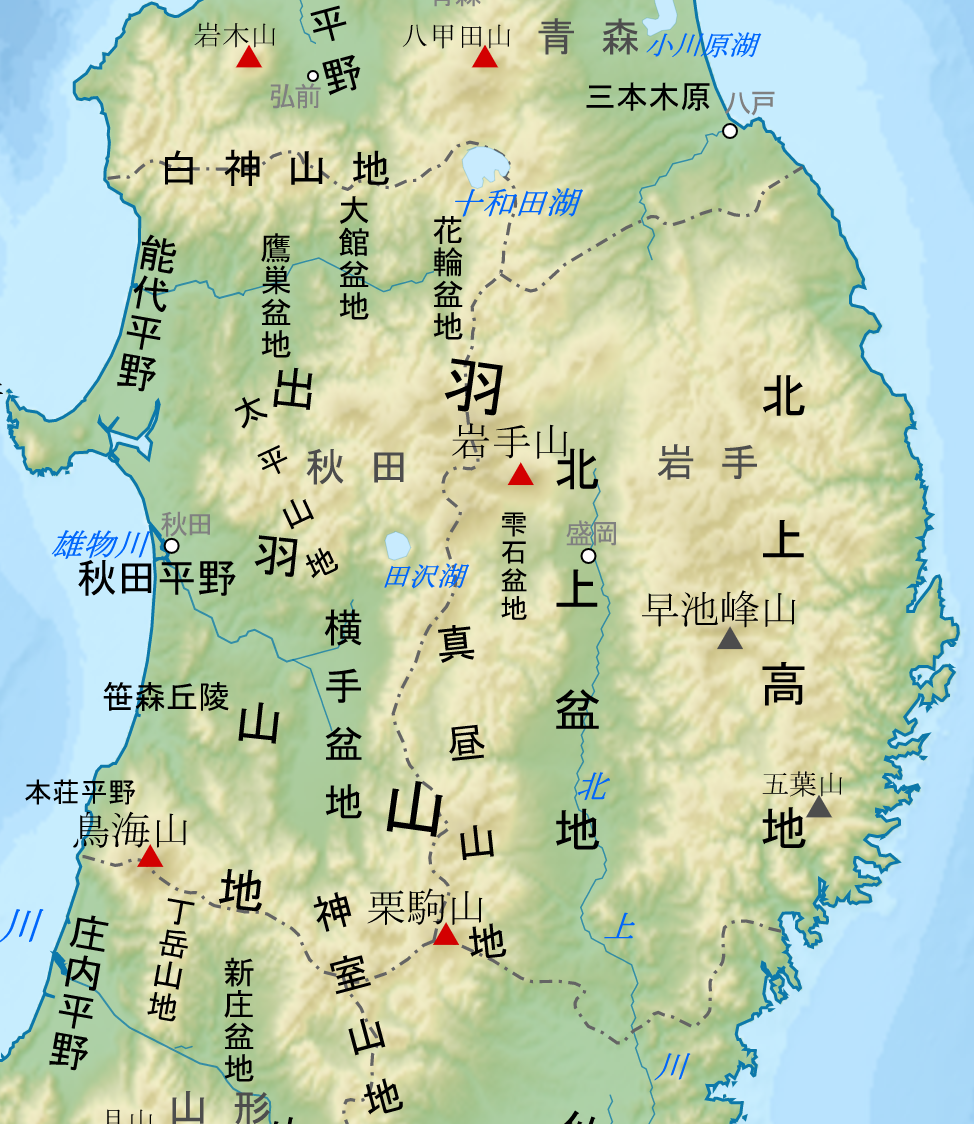
Location of Kitakami Mountains (北上高地)

Kitakami Mountains (北上山地, Kitakami sanchi) is a mountain range in northeastern Honshu, in the Tōhoku region of northern Japan. The range extends for 250 kilometres (160 mi) from the southern border of Aomori Prefecture in the north to the northern border of Miyagi Prefecture in the south, and are bordered by the Kitakami River valley in the west and the Pacific Ocean to the east, with an average width of around 80 kilometres (50 mi).The Kitakami Mountains are thus mostly located within eastern Iwate Prefecture. The range is largely an eroded plateau with a thick granite bedrock, thus accounting for its other name: Kitakami Plateau (北上高地, Kitakami-kōchi). In the north, the mountains are characterized by marine terraces at an altitude of around 300 meters, whereas in the south, the mountains are drowned to form a deeply indented rias coast.

Geologically, the Kitakami Mountains are Paleozoic and Mesozoic formations, divided into northern and southern groups. the southern area has oldest previous Silurian foundation, which was once a shallow sea on the continental margin where the water temperature was high enough for coral growth from the Silurian to the Devonian periods; this region, later collided with the northern Kitakami mountainous area in the early Cretaceous period, and the whole was penetrated by the granite in various places. Until the Paleogene, the Kitakami Mountains were geologically part of Primorsky region of Siberia. About 30 million years to 15 million years ago, the Japanese archipelago separated from the continent and moved to its present position. The Kitakami Mountains around that time was an island, the west side was a shallow sea, and the Ōu Mountains were not yet born. The uplift of the Ōu mountain range began in late Miocene and the Kitakami Basin was born. The Kitakami Mountains were exposed to erosion for a long time because they were above water from the Cenozoic onwards. In addition, as a result the glacier effects of the last glacial period, the current gentle topography was created.

Mount Hayachine, near the center of the range, is the highest peak at 1,917 metres (6,289 ft), and supports endemic alpine vegetation.

Notable caves within the Kitakami Mountains include Akkadō and Ryūsendō.

The peaks of the Kitakami mountains include the following:

- Mount Hayachine (早池峰山) 1917 m
- Hashigamidake (階上岳) 739.6 m
- Akkamori (安家森) 1239 m
- Kuromoriyama (黒森山) 837 m
- Goyozan (五葉山)1351 m
- Muroneyama (室根山) 895 m
- Omoriyama (大森山) 750 m
- Tokusenjosan (徳仙丈山) 711 m
- Tatsuganesan (田束山) 512 m
