= Takasago Uragorō =

Japanese sumo wrestler

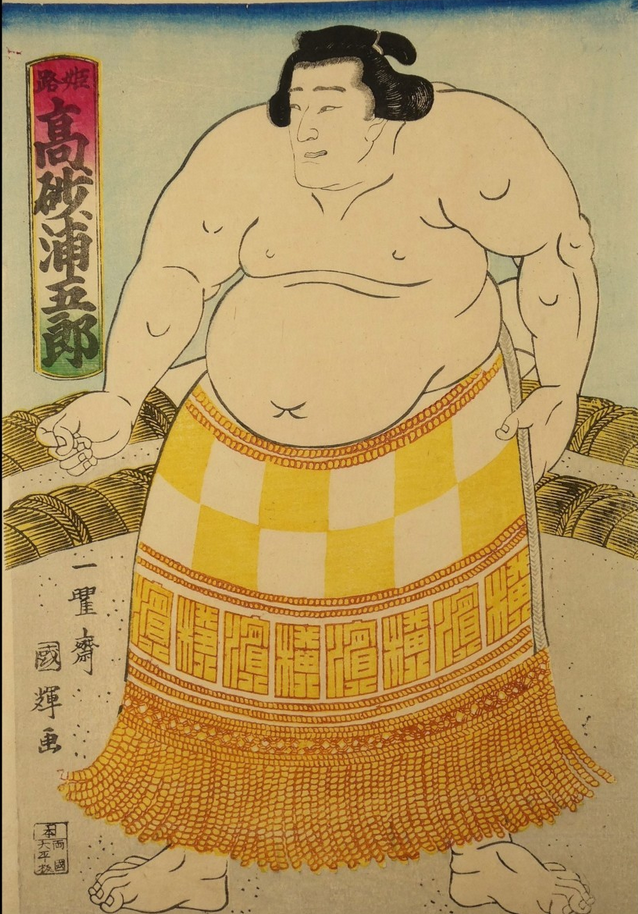

Personal information
- Native name: 高砂 浦五郎
- Born: Inosuke Yamasaki; 20 November 1838 Yamabe district, Kazusa Province, Japan
- Died: April 8, 1900 (aged 61)
- Height: 1.70 m (5 ft 7 in)
- Weight: 100 kg (220 lb)

Sport
- Sport: Sumo
- Retired: December, 1873
- Heya: Ōnomatsu → Chiganoura
- Record: 51-22-19-5 draws/1 hold
- Debut: July, 1863
- Highest rank: Maegashira 1 (March, 1871)
- Elder name: Takasago
- Updated on March, 2024

Takasago Uragorō (Japanese: 高砂 浦五郎; born Inosuke Yamasaki (山崎 伊之助, Yamasaki Inosuke), November 20, 1838 – April 8, 1900) was a Japanese sumo wrestler from Yamabe District, Kazusa Province (now Tōgane, Chiba Prefecture). His highest rank was maegashira 1.

Although he never reached a high rank in professional sumo, Takasago is a personality known for having led the first social movements of sumo wrestlers in Japan and for having founded the eponymous stable which is still active and still bears his name.

== Career ==
=== Early life and career ===
Yamasaki was the third son of a farmer. He joined the Edo-based sumo association at the age of twenty-one, in 1859, under the recommendation of an influential moneylender. He joined Chiganoura stable, where he was stablemate with Raiden Shin'emon. Later, he was given the shikona, or ring name, Takamiyama Daigorō (髙見山 大五郎), a name inspired by Mount Takami. Around 1865, he came to wrestle under the patronage of the Himeji Domain, along with Raiden and future-ōzeki Ayasegawa (then known as Aioi). In November 1869, he debuted in the makuuchi division at the age of thirty-two, because of his late recruitment in professional sumo. Although he achieved consistent results, Takamiyama never broke through to the upper echelons of the rankings, remaining a maegashira for the rest of his career.

At the end of the Edo period, the promotion system was decided by the tournament organizers who then distributed the profits to the elders who then redistributed funds to their wrestlers, with the wrestlers under the protection of the local lords receiving bonuses and having financial security and the others being kept in a situation of poverty. With the Meiji Restoration and the abolition of the han system, sumo wrestlers lost the patronage of the lords, who could no longer maintain households of their own and financial support from organizers gradually dried up.

It was during this period that Takamiyama first became involved in a reform movement aimed at improving the remuneration of wrestlers. However, the Himeji Domain had to simultaneously stop paying its wrestlers due to the abolition of their privileges, and Takamiyama and the other wrestlers found themselves without a stable source of remuneration in their turn. Out of filial piety, however, Takamiyama made the other wrestlers and himself swear an oath to always remain loyal to the Sakai clan (lords of the Himeji Domain). In 1870, Ayasegawa nevertheless ceded, and agreed to wrestle for the Yamauchi clan (Tosa Province). Enraged by the betrayal, Takamiyama went to Ayasegawa's residence sword in hand, intent on killing him. Eventually, the situation calmed down with the help of the elders of the Tokyo Sumo Association. For his deeds of loyalty, Takamiyama was rewarded by the Sakai clan, who gave him 75 ryō and later gave him his definitive name of Takasago Uragorō (高砂 浦五郎), a clan legacy inspired by the Takasago-no-Ura (高砂の浦), a famous beach in Harima Province (now Takasago in Hyōgo Prefecture) known for having been visited by Emperor Daigo and for being the inspiration of a play in noh classical dance-drama.

=== Secessionist incident ===
In 1873, Takasago was still an active makuuchi wrestler when he placed himself at the head of a group of some forty high-ranking wrestlers, again calling for reforms in the Tokyo-based sumo association. This second movement, launched in the middle of a joint tournament with the Osaka-based sumo association, immediately halted matches, threatening all wrestlers with a return to Tokyo without a participation bonus. Faced with this financial risk, some wrestlers denounced Takasago and the wrestlers who had followed him to the Tokyo elders, who later expelled all the strikers from the association.

Takasago and the other dismissed wrestlers joined forces with other wrestlers from the Osaka and Kyoto sumo associations to form the Takasago Kaisei-Gumi (高砂改正組), with great wrestlers of the time such as Ōzeki Zōgahana and Sekiwake Koyanagi and promising new recruits including future-yokozuna Nishinoumi I and future-ōzeki Ōdate. The group toured the western part of the country for several years before reaching back Tokyo in 1876, settling in Kanda, Tokyo and challenging the Tokyo-based association. Between 1876 and 1878, Tokyo thus had two rival sumo associations, a situation that came to an end in early 1878 when the Tokyo Metropolitan Police issued a requirement for local government authorization to organize as a sports association, and Takasago, who was then on tour, arrived too late to assert his right. After several months of negotiation, the Takasago Kaisei-Gumi, strong of a hundred wrestlers, was reinstated in the Tokyo-based sumo association. The movement formed a stable and became Takasago stable, which still exists today. Following this merger, the sumo association carried out several reforms long requested by Takasago, including the presence of a high-ranking wrestler from each side of the hanamichi to examine the promotions and demotions and the election of association directors, with low-ranking wrestlers delegating their voting rights to their stablemasters. Takasago himself was elected director in 1883. During his years in this position, he emerged as a key figure in the association, rivalled only by Ikazuchi (former yokozuna Umegatani I).

=== Power struggles within the Tokyo Sumo Association ===
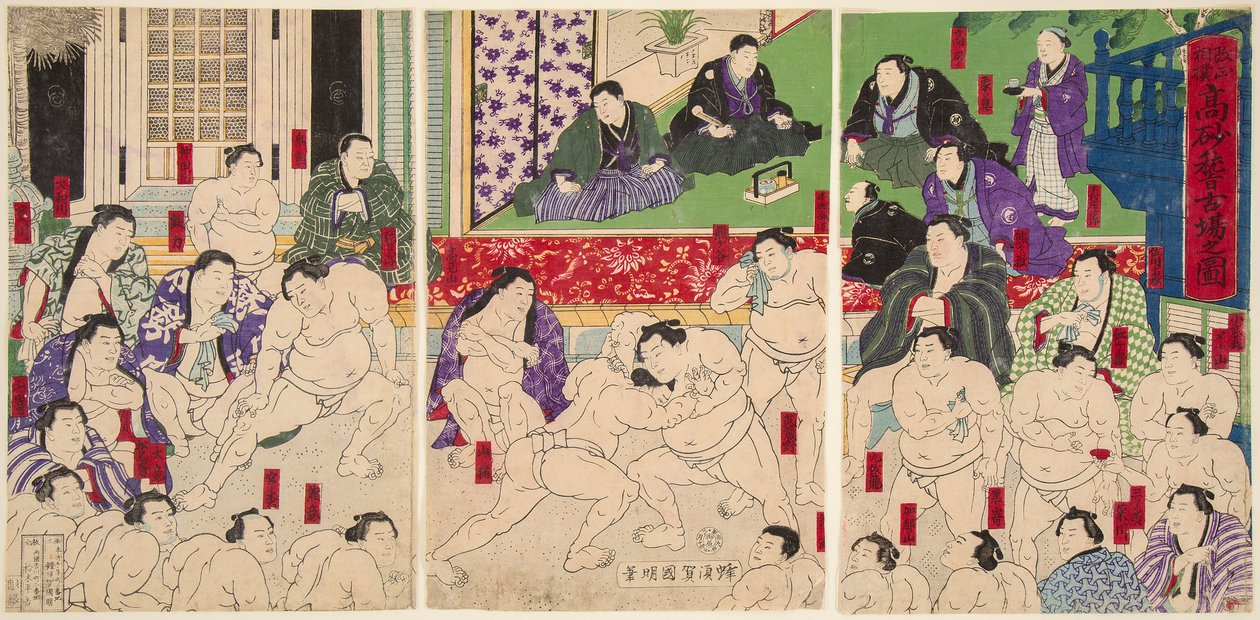
Takasago stable ukiyo-e representing a training session under Takasago Uragorō.

Takasago had a prolific career as a stablemaster, raising Ōdate to the rank of sekiwake (before the latter left the stable after clashing with his master). He also raised Nishinoumi and Konishiki I to the rank of yokozuna, and Asashio I and Ichinoya to the rank of ōzeki.

Takasago took great liberties with the traditional organization of tournaments and rankings. In 1890, he specifically requested that the rank of yokozuna, which until then had been more of a status than an actual rank, be noted as such on the banzuke, so that his disciple Nishinoumi would not have to be treated as a haridashi-ōzeki. Having a say in the organization of the rankings, Takasago began to abuse his position to favor his wrestlers. At the 1895 summer tournament, he himself tried to overturn a gyōji's decision to declare Nishinoumi the winner in his match against then-maegashira Hōō. The gyōji, to avoid conflict with both parties, declared the match a hold. In January 1896, he tried to rank Konishiki on the same side of the banzuke as Hōō, so that Konishiki would not face Tokyo's rising star. This change led to the resignation of several wrestlers associated with the Tatsunami ichimon (or clan) and a protest movement (called the Nakamurarō incident) led by Oguruma stable's wrestlers Ōtohira and Ōzutsu. As the protest grew, wrestlers from Takasago's own clan began to criticize him too, leading to his resignation in February 1896.

Takasago continued to train his wrestlers at the head of his stable until his death in April 1900. One of his disciples, Sekiwake Takamiyama Sōgorō (who had previously taken the elder name "Ōnomatsu" as its fifth-generation) succeeded him.

Takasago's tomb is located at the Enryū-in temple (妙運山 圓隆院), in Kōtō, Tokyo.

== Legacy ==
Takasago's previous shikona (ring name) of Takamiyama is considered a prestigious legacy in Takasago stable. The name is traditionally bestowed to promising wrestlers such as former sekiwake Takamiyama Torinosuke. Hawaiian sekiwake Takamiyama Daigorō was named after him but is actually the third Takamiyama Daigorō and the seventh Takamiyama (高見山).

== Top division record ==
- The actual time the tournaments were held during the year in this period often varied.

Takasago Uragorō
-	Spring	Summer
1868	Unknown	East Jūryō #6; 5–3; 1d
1869	East Jūryō #2; 6–2; 1h	East Maegashira #7; 6–1–1; 2d
1870	East Maegashira #4; 7–2–1	East Maegashira #3; 6–3–1
1871	East Maegashira #1; 2–2–6	West Maegashira #1; 3–2–5
1872	West Maegashira #1; 4–4–1; 1d	East Maegashira #1; 5–2–3
1873	East Maegashira #1; 7–1–1; 1d	Dismissed
Record given as win-loss-absent Top Division Champion Top Division Runner-up Retired Lower Divisions Key:d=Draw(s) (引分); h=Hold(s) (預り); Divisions: Makuuchi — Jūryō — Makushita — Sandanme — Jonidan — Jonokuchi Makuuchi ranks: Yokozuna — Ōzeki — Sekiwake — Komusubi — Maegashira

*Championships for the best record in a tournament were not recognized or awarded before the 1909 summer tournament and the above championships that are labelled "unofficial" are historically conferred. For more information see yūshō.

== See also ==
- Glossary of sumo terms
- List of past sumo wrestlers
