= Ichinoya Tōtarō =

Japanese sumo wrestler

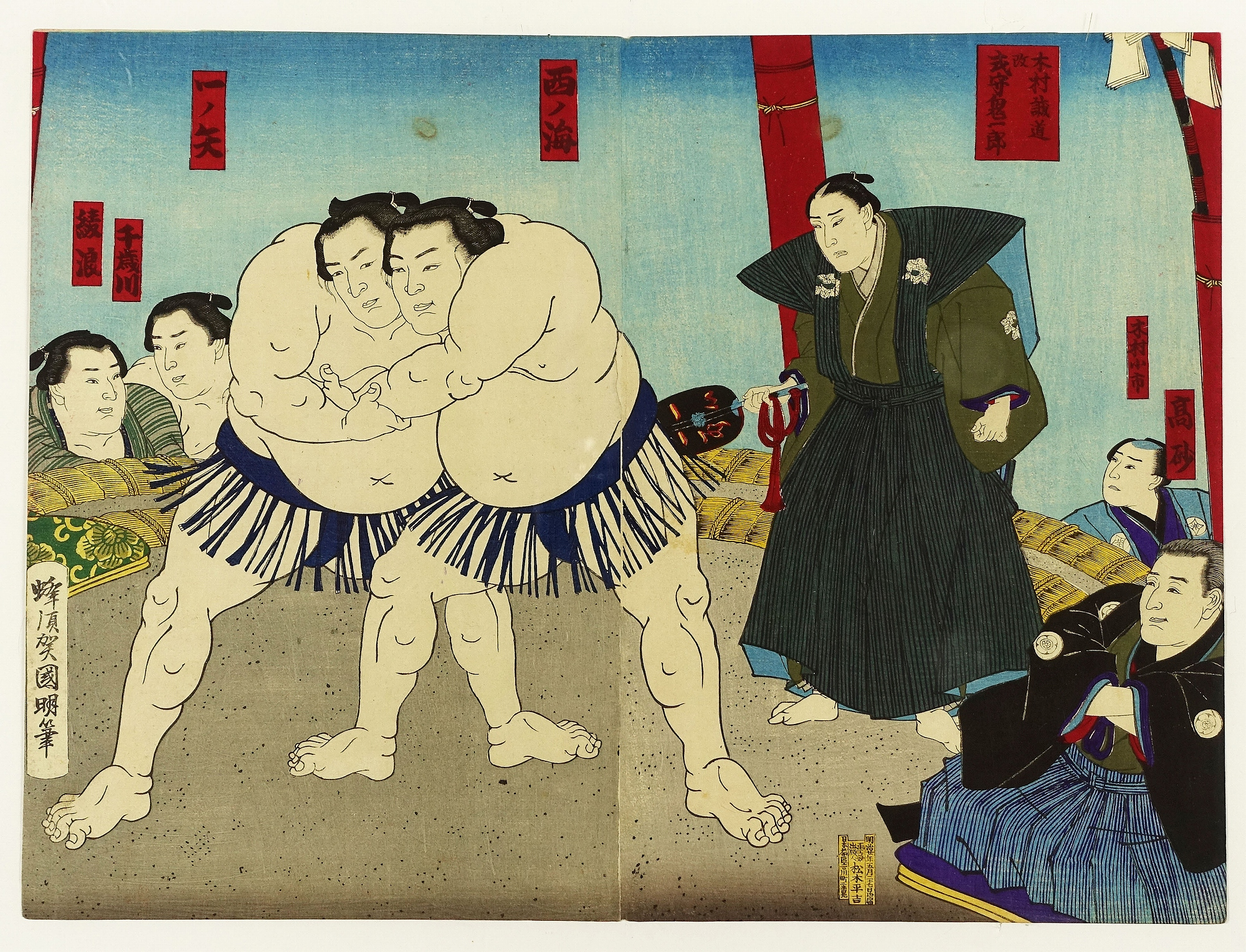
- Ichinoya (left) faces Nishinoumi I (right) in a sumo match in 1887

Personal information
- Native name: 一ノ矢 藤太郎
- Born: Tōtarō Fukushi; March 25, 1856 Minamitsugaru District, Aomori Prefecture, Japan
- Died: February 15, 1923 (aged 66)
- Height: 1.78 m (5 ft 10 in)
- Weight: 95 kg (209 lb)

Sport
- Sport: Sumo
- Heya: Takasago
- Record: 67-33-76-4 draws/10 holds (Makuuchi)
- Debut: May, 1880
- Highest rank: Ōzeki (January, 1889)
- Championships: 2 (Makuuchi, unofficial)
- Updated on September 2023

Ichinoya Tōtarō (Japanese: 一ノ矢 藤太郎; born Tōtarō Fukushi (福士 藤太郎, Fukushi Tōtarō), March 25, 1856 – February 15, 1923) was a Japanese sumo wrestler from Minamitsugaru District, Aomori Prefecture (now Inakadate, Aomori), Japan. His highest rank was ōzeki. He is the third ōzeki from Aomori Prefecture and the first promoted at this rank in 55 years, after Akitsukaze's promotion in 1834.

== Career ==
Ichinoya became the disciple of Takasago Uragorō, the founder of the current incarnation of Takasago stable, in May 1880. In May 1883, he was promoted to sumo's highest division, makuuchi, after only 6 tournaments in the lower divisions. Since his ascension to this division, there has always been at least one wrestler from Aomori prefecture in the makuuchi division. In his first tournament in this division, he won the championship. Ichinoya rose rapidly through the ranks, reaching rank of komusubi in 1887 for the January tournament. Gaining a reputation as a prodigy, he was considered along with Nishinoumi I and Ōdate, as one of the Takasago Sanbagarasu (高砂三羽烏), meaning "The Takasago Trio", to emphasize the potential of these three wrestlers. At this tournament, he won his second championship. However, as the yūshō system was not introduced until 1909, these championship victories are now considered unofficial. After this championship, he was promoted directly to the rank of sekiwake and, following two good tournaments in 1888, he was promoted to the second-highest rank in professional sumo, ōzeki. Ichinoya's ōzeki career, however, only lasted two tournaments and he was demoted back to sekiwake for the January 1890 tournament. Following his demotion, he continued to wrestle in the san'yaku ranks for another three years before retiring as a wrestler after the May 1892 tournament.

After retiring, he did not remain in the Sumo Association, but returned to his homeprefecture of Aomori and toured around the countryside, leading a local sumo group, living to the age of 66. Many people admired Ichinoya and Takasago stable began to become popular and well received by younger generations. For this reason, he was nicknamed Aomori sumo ōkoku chūkō no so (青森相撲王国中興の祖), meaning 'Founder of the Aomori Sumo Kingdom', since he is credited in part with the importance of the prefecture's wrestlers in the highest ranks of the sport.

In 1953, his grandson (Ryōichi Sudo) also became a professional wrestler within Kasugano stable. He adopted his grandfather's shikona, or ring name, in March 1957 and became Ichinoya Tōtarō II. Promoted to makuuchi in 1961, his highest rank was maegashira 4.

== Top division record ==
- The actual time the tournaments were held during the year in this period often varied.

Ichinoya Tōtarō
-	Spring	Summer
1883	Unknown	West Maegashira #10; 7–2–1; Unofficial
1884	West Maegashira #6; 3–4–1; 1d-1h	West Maegashira #6; 2–3–3; 2h
1885	West Maegashira #3; 4–3–1; 1d-1h	West Maegashira #2; 0–0–10
1886	West Maegashira #5; 6–3–1	West Maegashira #1; 6–3–1
1887	West Komusubi #1; 8–1–1; Unofficial	West Sekiwake #1; 3–1–6
1888	West Sekiwake #1; 4–1–4; 1h	West Sekiwake #1; 7–0–1; 2d
1889	West Ōzeki #1; 3–2–4; 1h	West Ōzeki #1; 6–3–1
1890	West Sekiwake #1; 1–3–5; 1h	East Sekiwake #1; 0–0–10
1891	East Komusubi #1; 5–3–2	East Komusubi #1; 0–0–10
1892	East Komusubi #1; 2–1–4; 3h	East Komusubi #1; Retired; 0–0–10
Record given as win-loss-absent Top Division Champion Top Division Runner-up Retired Lower Divisions Key:d=Draw(s) (引分); h=Hold(s) (預り); Divisions: Makuuchi — Jūryō — Makushita — Sandanme — Jonidan — Jonokuchi Makuuchi ranks: Yokozuna — Ōzeki — Sekiwake — Komusubi — Maegashira

*Championships for the best record in a tournament were not recognized or awarded before the 1909 summer tournament, and the unofficial championships above are historically conferred. For more information, see yūshō.

== See also ==
- Glossary of sumo terms
- List of past sumo wrestlers
- List of ōzeki

== Notes ==
1. As of September 2023, 140 years later, the record still stands with Takarafuji, Ōnoshō and Nishikifuji still competing in sumo's top division.
