= Zōgahana Heisuke =

Japanese sumo wrestler

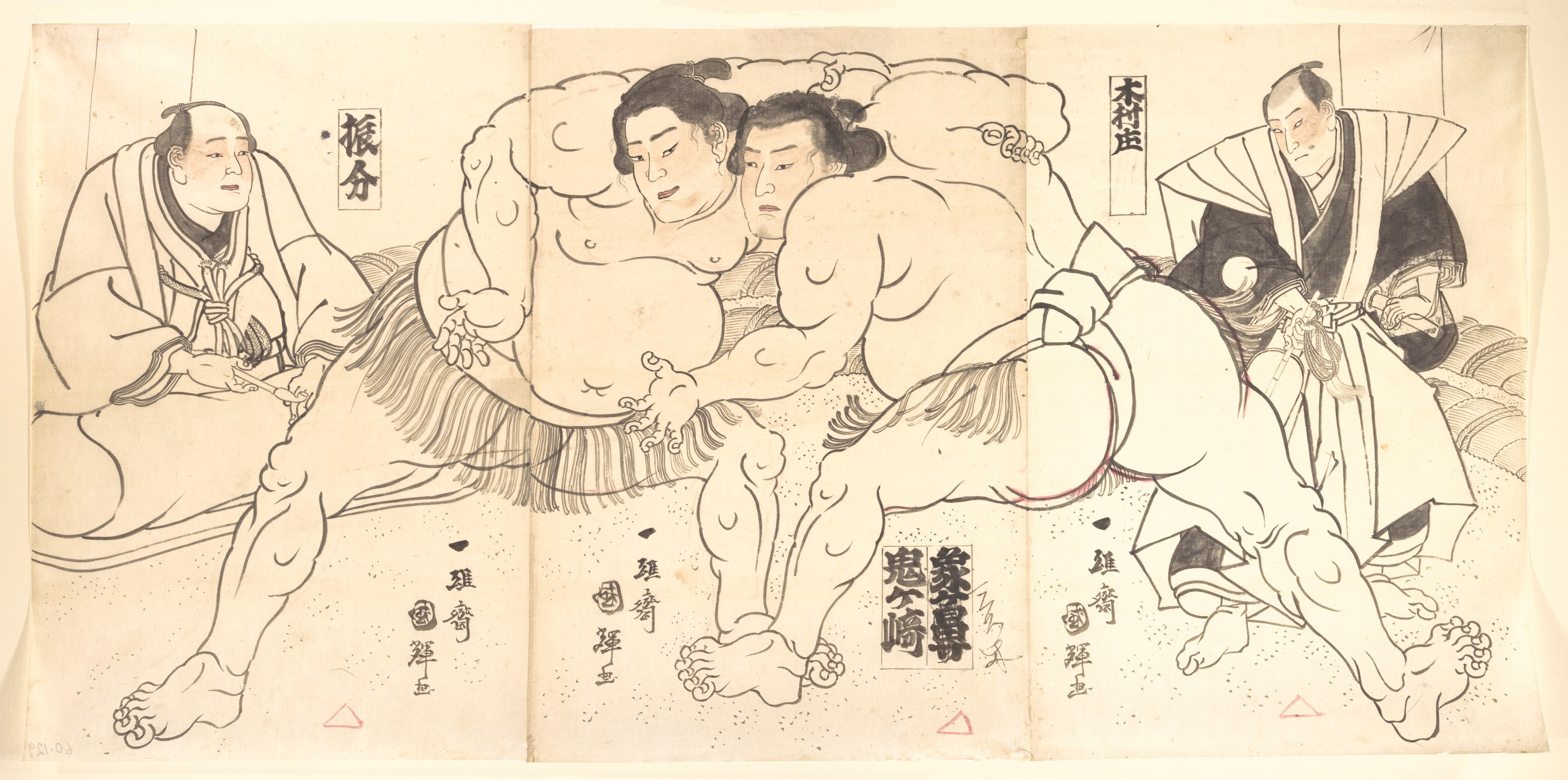
- Zōgahana (right) wrestling Onigasaki

Personal information
- Native name: 象ヶ鼻 平助
- Born: unknown 1836 Tateyama, Awa Province, Japan
- Died: March 18, 1890 (aged 53–54)
- Height: 1.71 m (5 ft 7 1/2 in)
- Weight: 103 kg (227 lb)

Sport
- Sport: Sumo
- Retired: April, 1872
- Heya: Tanigawa → Ikazuchi → Takasago
- Record: 48-29-30-15 draws/1 hold
- Debut: November, 1859
- Highest rank: Ōzeki (April, 1871)
- Elder name: Shiratama
- Updated on September 2023

Zōgahana Heisuke (Japanese: 象ヶ鼻 平助; 1836 – March 18, 1890)–but sometimes called "Zōgabana" or "Sōgahana" because of the Japanese phonological tendency called rendaku–was a Japanese sumo wrestler from Tateyama, Awa Province (now Tateyama, Chiba Prefecture). His highest rank was ōzeki. He is the fifth wrestler from the prefecture to have been promoted to this rank in total. He was promoted roughly at the same time as Sakaigawa, who became an ōzeki the year before. He was also the last to hold the title until Konishiki's promotion in 1890, 25 years later.

== Career ==
Zōgahana began wrestling in Tanigawa stable. He first wrestled under the shikona, or ring name, Kuwagata Heiji (鍬形 平次) but later changed it for Todoroki Heisuke (轟 平助). In 1866, he was recruited to serve the Marugame Domain. Just before his promotion to the makuuchi division, he changed his shikona to Zōgahana (象ヶ鼻), another name essentially meaning "elephant's (象) trunk (鼻)", an unusual choice. In 1871, he was promoted to ōzeki, professional sumo's second highest rank, because at the time Kimenzan, one of the leading wrestler of that time, just retired the year before, leaving the rankings unbalanced. His promotion to this rank, in just six tournaments since joining the makuuchi division, sets a precedent for extremely rapid ascent in the promotion system of the time. Zōgahana retired in April 1872 after only three tournaments at the rank of ōzeki. Since he retired at the rank of ōzeki, he was the first wrestler to retire at that rank in the Meiji era.

He remained in the sumo association for some times as an elder under the name Shiratama. However, in 1873 Takasago Uragorō launched his own group for reform of the sumo association, creating a parallel association and breaching out of the traditional system with some dissatisfied wrestlers. Zōgahana decided to join the group, resulting in his formal expulsion from the association. When the Takasago group was disbanded he returned to his home without charge and in disgrace. He died on March 18, 1890, at the age of 55. His tomb is located in the grounds of the Fudō-in Henshōji temple in his hometown of Tateyama.

== Top division record ==
- The actual time the tournaments were held during the year in this period often varied.

Zōgahana Heisuke
-	Spring	Summer
1865	Jūryō #30 –	Jūryō #30 –
1866	West Jūryō #8; 3–3; 1d	West Jūryō #7; 3–3; 3d
1867	East Jūryō #4; 3–3; 2d	East Jūryō #4; 3–4; 2d
1868	East Maegashira #7; 6–2–1; 1d	East Maegashira #4; 4–3–3
1869	East Maegashira #2; 8–1–1	East Maegashira #1; 5–0–2; 3d
1870	East Sekiwake #1; 5–2–2; 1h	West Sekiwake #1; 4–3–1; 2d
1871	West Ōzeki #1; 3–5–2	West Ōzeki #1; 1–0–8; 1d
1872	West Ōzeki #1; Retired; 0–0–10	
Record given as win-loss-absent Top Division Champion Top Division Runner-up Retired Lower Divisions Key:d=Draw(s) (引分); h=Hold(s) (預り); Divisions: Makuuchi — Jūryō — Makushita — Sandanme — Jonidan — Jonokuchi Makuuchi ranks: Yokozuna — Ōzeki — Sekiwake — Komusubi — Maegashira

== See also ==
- Glossary of sumo terms
- List of past sumo wrestlers
- List of ōzeki
