= Ōdate Uzaemon =

Japanese sumo wrestler ( 1853–1904)

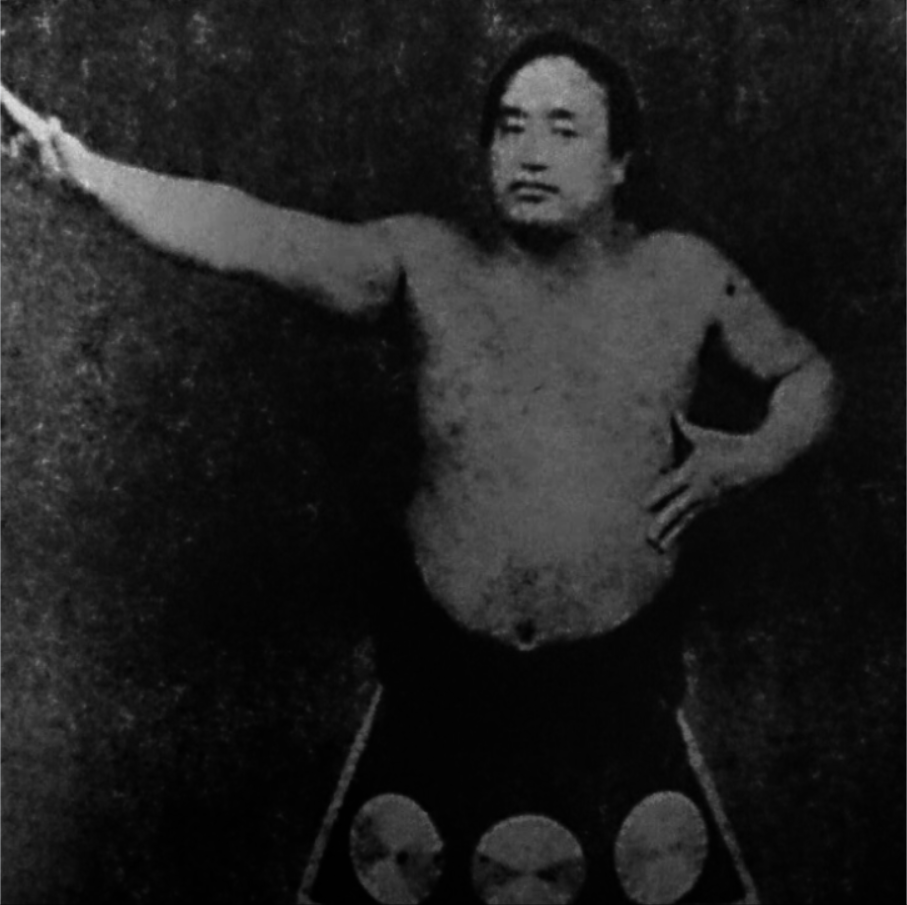

Personal information
- Native name: 大達羽 左エ門
- Born: Benji Suwa; December 15, 1853 Tagawa, Dewa Province, Japan
- Died: August 17, 1904 (aged 50)
- Height: 1.75 m (5 ft 9 in)
- Weight: 125 kg (276 lb)

Sport
- Sport: Sumo
- Retired: June, 1895
- Heya: Tatsutagawa → Takasago → Isenoumi → Chiganoura
- Record: 114-52-109-19 draws/3 holds
- Debut: December, 1873
- Highest rank: Ōzeki (January, 1885)
- Elder name: Chiganoura
- Championships: 4 (Makuuchi, unofficial)
- Updated on September 2023

Ōdate Uzaemon (Japanese: 大達羽 左エ門; born Benji Suwa (諏訪 辯治, Suwa Benji), December 15, 1853 – August 17, 1904) was a Japanese sumo wrestler from Tagawa, Dewa Province (now Tsuruoka, Yamagata Prefecture), Japan. His highest rank was ōzeki. He is the fifth ōzeki from Yamagata Prefecture and the last promoted at this rank until the promotion of Kashiwado in September 1960, 72 years later. Nicknamed Boujakufujin (傍若無人), meaning 'insolent', he was known both for his bad manners and outrages towards his masters, and for his wrestling skills, boosting sumo's popularity at a match given in honor of Emperor Meiji.

== Career ==
Ōdate was born as the second son of a farmer named Suwa Giemon. Since he was a child, he was active in local sumo wrestling, which earned him a reputation as a fierce wrestler, even earning the nickname kidō (鬼童), meaning 'demon boy'. Because of his gluttony and love of sumo, he often neglected his work, so he was abandoned by his family. He moved to Tokyo and entered Tatsutagawa stable with the aim of becoming a professional sumo wrestler (rikishi). He made his professional debut in December 1873 as a jonidan. In 1874, he was expelled from the world of professional sumo for the first time after hitting his master. Without a stable, he retired for a time to Niigata Prefecture and worked in a sake brewery.

In 1877, he was recruited by Takasago Uragorō within the Takasago Kaisei-Gumi (高砂改正組). In June 1882, he made his makuuchi debut and excited the audience with his dynamic moves, mainly using pushing and throwing techniques, which made use of his great strength. In addition to Ōdate's strength, his physique was said to have broad shoulders and strong muscles. On 10 March 1884, at the tenran tournament held in Tokyo, he fought against Umegatani I, the "invincible yokozuna", in one of the most commented match of its time. The fight, which took place at the request of Emperor Meiji, lasted 40 minutes, and the emperor was said to have been overjoyed when the match ended in a draw. This bout left its mark as one of the great matches that represented Tokyo-sumo in the early Meiji period. This legendary bout took place again during the May tournament, with Umegatani in a position of dominance, recording a winning streak of 35 matches. That time, Ōdate won the match and ended the streak by tsukidashi after a water break. With eight victories, Ōdate won the equivalent of a championship for the first time in his career. During this tournament, Ōzeki Wakashima also retired and Ōdate was presaged to take his rank directly from the rank of komusubi. At the January 1885 tournament rankings, however, it was announced that it would be Nishinoumi, Ōdate's junior in Takasago stable, who would be promoted to this rank. Enraged, Ōdate had a heated debate with his master Takasago, going so far as to hit him. In return, Ōdate was excluded from his second stable. Nevertheless, at the height of his popularity, Ōdate was named ōzeki haridashi to mark his achievement in an official banzuke reprinted after the incident. After mediation between the various parties, Ōdate acknowledged the assault and agreed to be demoted as punishment in the May tournament rankings of the same year. Since he could no longer work with Takasago, Ōdate was transferred to Isenoumi stable, eventually joining Chiganoura stable at a later date.

In January 1886, Ōdate achieved his long-awaited promotion to ōzeki. At the time, he was also given a set of three keshō-mawashi since his patrons were betting on his continued good results and consequent promotion to the rank of yokozuna. From 1884 until May 1887, Ōdate was in a period of competitions dominance, winning four championships and being runner-up in one. It is said that during this period Umegatani wanted to avoid facing Ōdate because of his strength. However, as the yūshō system was not introduced until 1909, these championship victories are now considered unofficial. Also, due to heavy drinking problems, he had to declare himself kyūjō (absent) from all competitions due to gastrointestinal illness in January 1888. As he chose not to appear for four tournaments in a row, and was demoted directly to komusubi. His successive absences and poor results led to his further demotion, and between 1888 and 1895 he recorded only one positive score (kachi-koshi).

Ōdate retired from active competition in June 1895. After his retirement as a wrestler, he took over the Chiganoura name from his last master and took charge of the latter's stable, remaining in the Tokyo Sumo Association as an elder. As a trainer, he is said to have been a compassionate man toward his disciples but didn't raise any great wrestlers and died on 17 August 1904. The stable folded upon his death, and its wrestlers moved to Takasago stable.

== Top division record ==
- The actual time the tournaments were held during the year in this period often varied.

Ōdate Uzaemon
-	Spring	Summer
1880	Unknown	East Jūryō #8; 4–1; 1d
1881	East Jūryō #10; 7–1; 2d	West Jūryō #8; 8–0; 2d
1882	West Jūryō #3; 8–0	West Maegashira #7; 6–2–2
1883	West Maegashira #1; 0–0–10	West Maegashira #4; 5–3–2
1884	West Maegashira #3; 6–1–1; 1d-1h	West Komusubi #1; 8–0–1; 1d Unofficial
1885	West Haridashi Ōzeki; 7–1–1; 1d Unofficial	West Sekiwake #1; 8–1–1; Unofficial
1886	West Ōzeki #1; 7–2–1	West Ōzeki #1; 6–0–3; 1d
1887	West Ōzeki #1; 6–1–3	West Ōzeki #1; 7–0–2; 1d Unofficial
1888	West Ōzeki #1; 0–0–10	West Ōzeki #1; 0–0–10
1889	West Komusubi #1; 0–0–10	West Maegashira #1; 0–0–10
1890	West Haridashi Maegashira; 3–4–3	West Maegashira #4; 0–0–10
1891	Unknown	East Maegashira #4; 3–3; 2d
1892	East Maegashira #4; 2–5–2; 1d	East Maegashira #7; 5–3–1; 1d
1893	East Maegashira #2; 0–0–10	East Maegashira #4; 3–3–1; 1d-1h
1894	East Maegashira #4; 1–7–1; 1h	West Maegashira #6; 3–4–1; 2d
1895	East Maegashira #7; 1–2–6; 1d	West Maegashira #5; Retired; 0–5–5
Record given as win-loss-absent Top Division Champion Top Division Runner-up Retired Lower Divisions Key:d=Draw(s) (引分); h=Hold(s) (預り); Divisions: Makuuchi — Jūryō — Makushita — Sandanme — Jonidan — Jonokuchi Makuuchi ranks: Yokozuna — Ōzeki — Sekiwake — Komusubi — Maegashira

*Championships for the best record in a tournament were not recognized or awarded before the 1909 summer tournament, and the unofficial championships above are historically conferred. For more information, see yūshō.

== See also ==
- Glossary of sumo terms
- List of past sumo wrestlers
- List of ōzeki
