= Konishiki Yasokichi I =

Japanese sumo wrestler (1867–1914)

Konishiki Yasokichi
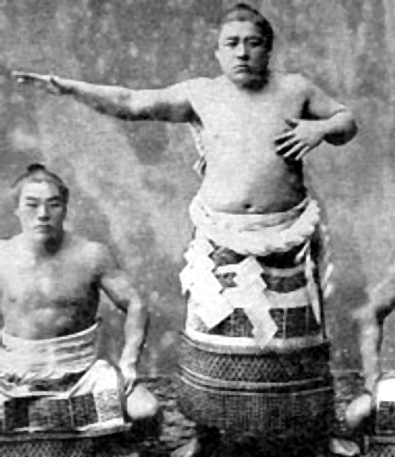

Personal information
- Native name: 小錦 八十吉
- Born: Iwai Yasokichi; November 10, 1867 Musha District, Kazusa, Japan
- Died: October 22, 1914 (aged 46)
- Height: 1.68 m (5 ft 6 in)
- Weight: 128 kg (282 lb)

Sport
- Sport: Sumo
- Retired: January, 1901
- Heya: Takasago
- Record: 119-24-101; 9draws-7holds(Makuuchi)
- Debut: May, 1883
- Highest rank: Yokozuna (March 1896)
- Elder name: Hatachiyama
- Championships: 7 (Makuuchi, unofficial)
- Updated on October 2007

Konishiki Yasokichi I (小錦 八十吉; November 10, 1867 – October 22, 1914) was a Japanese professional sumo wrestler from Musha District, Kazusa Province. He was the sport's 17th yokozuna.

== Early life and career ==
His real name was Iwai Yasokichi (岩井 八十吉). He was the son of a former ōzeki named Iwajikawa (岩城川) who wanted his son to become a rikishi. His father asked professional wrestler Takamiyama Sogoro (高見山宗五郎), who had come to Sakura on a tour in 1881, to initiate his son into the sport in Takasago stable. At first, Iwai was unable to endure the rigorous training and ran away to his parents' house a couple of times, but with his father's encouragement, he decided to rejoin in 1883 and took up the name Konishiki (小錦). Konishiki earned the nickname of Kurueru Shirozō (狂える白象; "raging white elephant") because of his soft, fair-skinned body and ability to get off his feet. He was very popular for his white body, gentle and pretty appearance, and warmth and innocence. He was also a popular figure in the sumo world because of his low profile, honesty, earnestness and his work ethic.

== Yokozuna ==
When he received his yokozuna license from the Yoshida family after the May 1896 tournament, he was the first yokozuna in history to receive the license while in his 20s. However, he was already past his prime and did not win a single championship when competing at this rank. It is said that his results were so weak because, around the time of his promotion to yokozuna, his stablemaster (former sekiwake Takamiyama Sōgorō) suffered an illness, and so Konishiki took care of him. In spite of his amazing debut, he did not have the best record in any tournaments as yokozuna. On April 8, 1900, his stablemaster died. Konishiki was absent from the next tournament and retired in January 1901. In the top makuuchi division, he won 119 bouts and lost 24 bouts, recording a winning percentage of 83.2.

== Retirement from sumo and death ==
Konishiki stayed in the Tokyo Sumo Association as an elder under the name of Hatachiyama (二十山). He founded the eponymous stable and raised komusubi Konishiki Yasokichi II. Konishiki's great hobby was reading novels and he continued to have a good relationship with the younger wrestlers who replaced him at the top of sumo. Among others, yokozuna Umegatani Tōtarō I and ōzeki Araiwa Kamenosuke would come to listen to him read.
Konishiki died on October 22, 1914, at 46. He died just before being officially granted the name "Takasago". As the title was posthumously awarded, he is not counted in the list of Takasago elders. After his death, the Takasago name was succeeded by Asashio Tarō II, who became the stable head coach.

== Homage ==
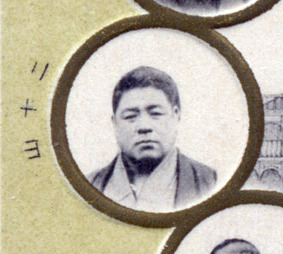
Konishiki on a commemorative postcard depicting the first Ryōgoku Kokugikan in 1909

The Konishiki shikona is considered a prestigious legacy in Takasago stable. The name is traditionally bestowed to promising wrestlers. Hawaiian-born ōzeki Konishiki Yasokichi was named after him but is actually the 6th generation Konishiki. In total, three wrestlers named Konishiki have been promoted to the top makuuchi division.

== Fighting style ==
Konishiki made up for his lack of physical strength with intense training. He was famous for his tachi-ai, attacking so quickly he had already started the match before the gyōji had the time to finish saying "hakkeyoi". He was good at pushing through and was known as a versatile fighter who could strike, hang, throw, and twist. In addition his style was a combination of fierce and agile wrestling.

== Top division record ==
Konishiki
-	Spring	Summer
1888	x	West Maegashira #9; 8–0–1; 1h Unofficial
1889	West Maegashira #1; 7–0–1; 1d 1h Unofficial	West Komusubi; 7–0–1; 1d 1h
1890	West Komusubi; 8–0–2; Unofficial	East Ōzeki; 1–0–9
1891	East Ōzeki; 8–0–1; 1d Unofficial	Sat out
1892	East Ōzeki; 1–1–8	East Ōzeki; 8–0–1; 1h Unofficial
1893	East Ōzeki; 7–2–1	East Ōzeki; 7–0–3; Unofficial
1894	East Ōzeki; 5–2–3	Sat out
1895	East Ōzeki; 8–1–1; Unofficial	Sat out
1896	East Ōzeki; 7–1–2	East Yokozuna; 8–1–1
1897	East Yokozuna; 5–3–1; 1h	East Yokozuna; 6–2–1-1draw
1898	East Yokozuna; 3–3–1; 3d	East Yokozuna; 3–1–4; 2h
1899	East Yokozuna; 6–2–1; 1d	East Yokozuna; 1–2–7
1900	East Yokozuna; 5–3–1; 1d	Sat out
1901	East Yokozuna; Retired; 0–0	x
Record given as win-loss-absent Top Division Champion Top Division Runner-up Retired Lower Divisions Key:d=Draw(s) (引分); h=Hold(s) (預り); Divisions: Makuuchi — Jūryō — Makushita — Sandanme — Jonidan — Jonokuchi Makuuchi ranks: Yokozuna — Ōzeki — Sekiwake — Komusubi — Maegashira

*Championships for the best record in a tournament were not recognized or awarded before the 1909 summer tournament and the above unofficial championships are historically conferred. For more information see yūshō.

== See also ==
- Glossary of sumo terms
- List of past sumo wrestlers
- List of yokozuna

Preceded by Nishinoumi Kajirō I	17th Yokozuna; 1896–1901	Succeeded by Ōzutsu Man'emon
Yokozuna is not a successive rank, and more than one wrestler can hold the title at once
