= Wakashima Kyūzaburō =

Japanese sumo wrestler

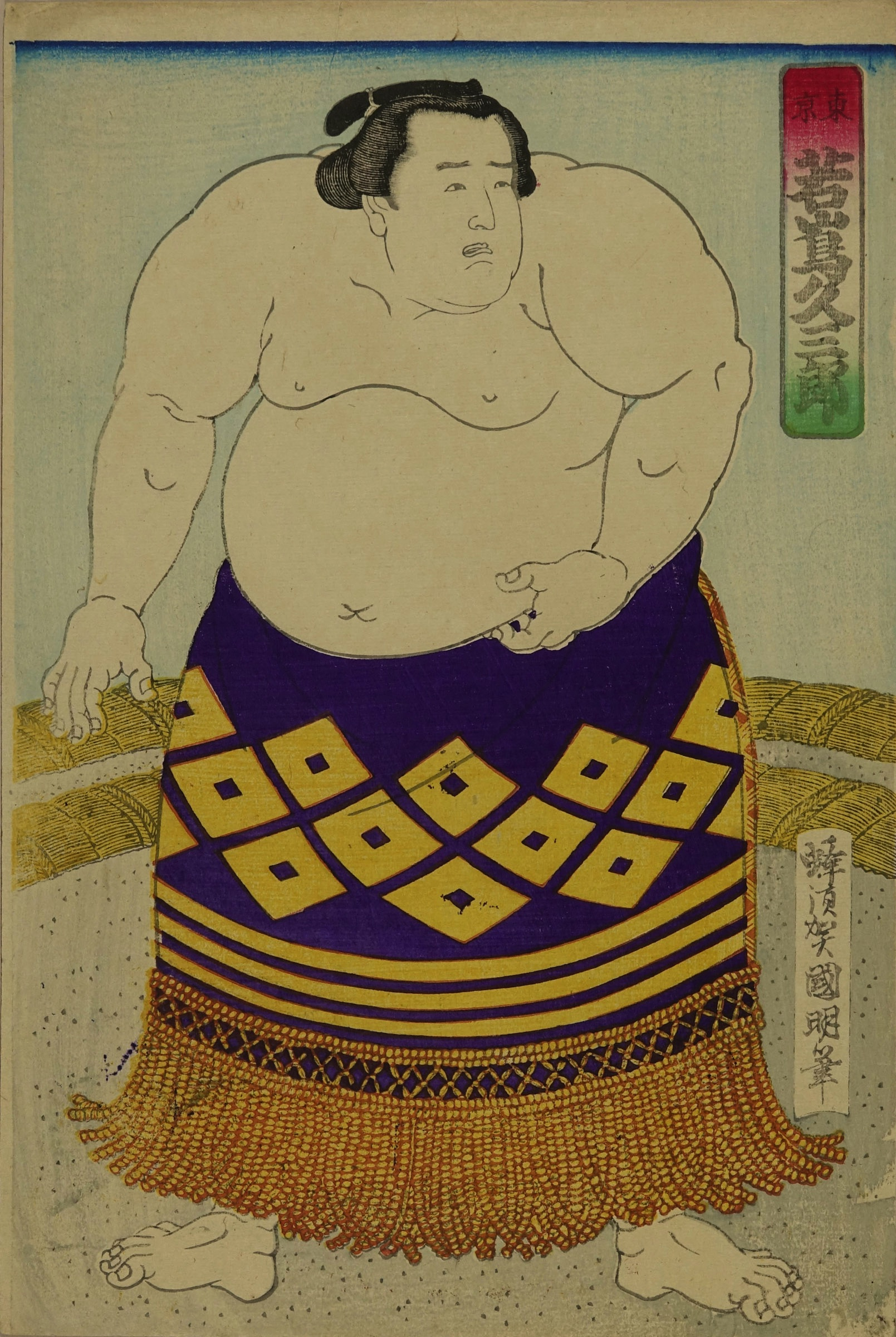
- Wakashima by Utagawa Kuniaki II (c. 1874)

Personal information
- Native name: 若島 久三郎
- Born: Kyūzaburō Nemoto; September, 1842 Aizu, Mutsu Province, Japan
- Died: January 6, 1891 (aged 48)
- Height: 1.74 m (5 ft 8 1/2 in)
- Weight: 113 kg (249 lb)

Sport
- Sport: Sumo
- Retired: May, 1884
- Heya: Tateyama
- Record: 136-53-53-22 draws/5 hold
- Debut: March, 1862
- Highest rank: Ōzeki (January, 1881)
- Elder name: Tateyama
- Championships: 2 (Makuuchi, unofficial)
- Updated on September, 2023

Wakashima Kyūzaburō (若島 久三郎; September, 1842 – January 6, 1891) was a Japanese professional sumo wrestler from Aizu, Mutsu Province (now Aizuwakamatsu, Fukushima Prefecture). His highest rank was ōzeki. As of January 1881, he is the only professional wrestler from this prefecture to have reached this rank.

== History ==
Wakashima was born the second son of a lacquerware painter. He began sumo as an amateur, serving in dedication tournaments in shrines. He eventually decided to turn professional because he was scouted by former maegashira Omaki Kōji, the fifth generation Tateyama and joined the Tateyama stable, taking part in his first tournament in March 1862. He was a wrestler known for his pushing and thrusting techniques (tsuki/oshi), but he rose slowly up the rankings, probably due to his cautious wrestling style.

Shortly before his promotion to the jūryō division, he had to leave the Sumo Association briefly to serve in the Boshin War, alongside the Aizu Domain. After the war and the defeat of the domain, he came back to his stable and reached the makuuchi division in 1874. After this promotion, he quickly blossomed, and reached the status of san'yaku barely four years after his debut in this division, winning the equivalent of two tournaments in the process. However, as the yūshō system was not invented until 1909, these championships are now considered unofficial. In the January 1881 tournament, Wakashima faced Umegatani, who was then a dominant ōzeki, recording a winning streak of 58 consecutive victories. Wakashima won the match and ended Umegatani's winning streak, nevertheless recording his only victory over the wrestler.

In the summer of 1881, during a jungyō (regional tour) in the Tōhoku region, Wakashima accompanied yokozuna Sakaigawa, who had just retired after the January tournament. As Sakaigawa could no longer perform his ring-entering ceremony, Wakashima took charge of the ceremonies. This decision was significant at the time because the Yoshida family had not granted its yokozuna licence to Wakashima, who could, however count on the support of the prefectural magistrate of his home prefecture.

Between 1882 and 1883, he became an elder under the name Tateyama, succeeding his former master at the head of his stable. He however continued to wrestle under the two licenses system and took the shikona, or ring name, Tateyama Kyūzaburō (楯山 久三郎). He retired after the summer tournament of 1884, and devoted himself entirely to his stable as an elder. As a coach, he raised yokozuna Wakashima. He died on 6 January 1891, at the age of 48.

== Career record ==
Wakashima Kyūzaburō
-	Spring	Summer
1870	Unknown	West Jūryō #9; 5–3; 1d
1871	West Jūryō #5; 5–5	West Jūryō #5; 6–1; 2d
1872	West Jūryō #2; 0–4; 2d	East Jūryō #3; 6–1; 1d-1h
1873	East Jūryō #2; 5–1; 1d	East Jūryō #1; 5–4
1874	East Maegashira #6; 6–1–1; 2d	East Maegashira #5; 5–2–1; 2d
1875	East Maegashira #4; 5–2–2; 1d	Unknown
1876	East Maegashira #3; 8–1–1; Unofficial	East Maegashira #2; 7–1–2
1877	East Maegashira #1; 7–1–1; 1h	East Komusubi #1; 7–1–1; 1d
1878	East Sekiwake #1; 5–3–1; 1d	East Sekiwake #1; 5–2–2; 1h
1879	East Sekiwake #1; 6–1–2; 1d	West Sekiwake #1; 6–0–1; 2d-1h Unofficial
1880	West Sekiwake #1; 5–2–3	East Sekiwake #1; 7–2–1
1881	East Ōzeki #1; 7–2–1	East Ōzeki #1; 3–3–3; 1d
1882	East Ōzeki #1; 4–2–1; 2d-1h	East Ōzeki #1; 5–2–3
1883	West Ōzeki #1; 0–0–10	West Ōzeki #1; 5–3–1; 1d
1884	West Ōzeki #1; 1–3–5; 1d	West Ōzeki #1; Retired; 0–0–10
Record given as win-loss-absent Top Division Champion Retired Lower Divisions Key: d=Draw(s) (引分); h=Hold(s) (預り); nr=no result recorded Divisions: Makuuchi — Jūryō — Makushita — Sandanme — Jonidan — Jonokuchi Makuuchi ranks: Yokozuna (not ranked as such on banzuke until 1890); Ōzeki — Sekiwake — Komusubi — Maegashira

*Championships for the best record in a tournament were not recognized or awarded before the 1909 summer tournament and the above championships that are labelled "unofficial" are historically conferred. For more information see yūshō.

== See also ==
- Glossary of sumo terms
- List of past sumo wrestlers
- List of ōzeki
