= Nishinoumi Kajirō I =

Japanese sumo wrestler

Nishinoumi Kajirō
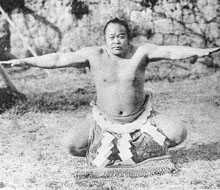

Personal information
- Native name: 西ノ海 嘉治郎
- Born: Kozono Kajirō; February 19, 1855 Sendai, Satsuma, Japan
- Died: November 30, 1908 (aged 53)
- Height: 1.76 m (5 ft 9 1/2 in)
- Weight: 128 kg (282 lb)

Sport
- Sport: Sumo
- Retired: January 1896
- Heya: Takasago
- Record: 127-37-97-25draws-4holds
- Debut: January 1882 (Tokyo sumo)
- Highest rank: Yokozuna (March, 1890)
- Championships: 2 (Makuuchi, unofficial)
- Updated on September 2007

Nishinoumi Kajirō I (西ノ海 嘉治郎; February 19, 1855 – November 30, 1908) was a Japanese professional sumo wrestler from Sendai, Satsuma Province. He was the sport's 16th yokozuna, and the first to be officially listed as such on the banzuke ranking sheets, an act which strengthened the prestige of yokozuna as the highest level of achievement in professional sumo.

== Early career ==
His real name was Kozono Kajirō (小園 嘉次郎). He began his career in Kyoto sumo, joining Tokinokoe stable in 1873. He was promoted to the top makuuchi division in 1879, and made sekiwake in September 1879, a tournament which was held under the joint auspices of the Kyoto and Osaka sumo organisations. He was persuaded by Takasago Uragorō, formerly of Osaka sumo, to join Tokyo sumo in his newly founded Takasago stable. He made his debut in a special makuuchi division rank in January 1882. He had a rapid rise, making ōzeki just seven tournaments later in January 1885. His rivals included stablemates Ōdate, Ichinoya and Konishiki. Gaining a reputation as a prodigy, he was considered along with Ichinoya and Ōdate, as one of the Takasago Sanbagarasu (高砂三羽烏), meaning "The Three Ravens of Takasago", to emphasize the power and potential of these three wrestlers. Nishinoumi fell to sekiwake in January 1886, despite recording a kachi-koshi winning score, as at the time a sekiwake on the east side of the banzuke with a better record could overtake an ōzeki on the same side. After winning a yūshō equivalent with an unbeaten 9–0 score in May 1889 he returned to ōzeki, and after another good 7–2 score in the next tournament he was awarded a yokozuna licence in March 1890.

== Yokozuna ==
However, Nishinoumi's promotion caused a problem. Although he had been made a yokozuna, his rank was listed as haridashi ōzeki, below his rival ōzeki Konishiki Yasokichi I on the banzuke (the sumo wrestlers' hierarchy) for the May 1890 tournament. This was because of Konishiki's 8–0 unbeaten score in the previous tournament. Nishinoumi's name was literally shunted out to the side on the banzuke, and he complained about this to those in authority. To placate him, yokozuna was written on the banzuke for the first time in sumo history. It was a compromise specifically for him, but because of this the name yokozuna became an official rank for the first time after this dispute. In the top makuuchi division, he won 127 bouts and lost 37 bouts, recording a winning percentage of 77.4.

== Retirement from sumo ==
Nishinoumi became an elder known as Izutsu after his retirement in January 1896, and became head coach of Izutsu stable. He produced several top wrestlers from Kagoshima Prefecture, amongst them the 25th yokozuna Nishinoumi Kajirō II (the great-grandfather of current Izutsu head Sakahoko) who succeeded him upon his death from heart failure in 1908.

== Top division record ==
Nishinoumi
-	Spring	Summer
1882	East Maegashira #9; 5–1–3; 1d	East Maegashira #9; 4–3–2; 1d
1883	West Maegashira #5; 5–2–1; 2d	West Komusubi; 3–1–5; 1d
1884	West Sekiwake; 5–1–1; 3d	West Sekiwake; 5–2–1; 1d 1h
1885	West Ōzeki; 3–0–2; 5d	West Ōzeki; 6–1–1; 2d
1886	West Sekiwake; 4–2–1; 2d 1h	West Sekiwake; 5–3–1; 1d
1887	West Sekiwake; 4–1– 1d	West Komusubi; 1–0–9
1888	West Komusubi; 5–2–2; 1d	West Komusubi; 6–2–1; 1d
1889	West Sekiwake; 6–1–1; 2d	West Sekiwake; 9–0–1; Unofficial
1890	West Ōzeki; 7–2–1	East Yokozuna; 3–1–5; 1d
1891	East Yokozuna; 7–2–1	East Yokozuna; 3–1–6
1892	East Yokozuna; 1–1–8	East Yokozuna; 6–1–2; 1h
1893	East Yokozuna; 6–3–1	East Yokozuna; 5–3–2
1894	East Yokozuna; 7–0–3; Unofficial	Sat out
1895	East Yokozuna; 4–0–6	East Yokozuna; 2–1–6; 1h
1896	East Yokozuna; Retired; 0–0–10	x
Record given as win-loss-absent Top Division Champion Top Division Runner-up Retired Lower Divisions Key:d=Draw(s) (引分); h=Hold(s) (預り); Divisions: Makuuchi — Jūryō — Makushita — Sandanme — Jonidan — Jonokuchi Makuuchi ranks: Yokozuna — Ōzeki — Sekiwake — Komusubi — Maegashira

*Championships for the best record in a tournament were not recognized or awarded before the 1909 summer tournament and the above unofficial championships are historically conferred. For more information see yūshō.

== See also ==
- Glossary of sumo terms
- List of past sumo wrestlers
- List of yokozuna

Preceded by Umegatani Tōtarō I	16th Yokozuna; 1890–1896	Succeeded by Konishiki Yasokichi I
Yokozuna is not a successive rank, and more than one wrestler can hold the title at once
