= Mochikyūkin =

Monetary sumo tournament reward

In sumo, sekitori-ranked wrestlers receive a monetary reward at the end of each tournament that supplements their basic salary. This system is called rikishi hōshōkin (力士褒賞金), and it is based on a personal bounty held by each wrestler called mochikyūkin (持ち給金; lit. "salary holdings" or "possession wages").

== Overview ==
In addition to their monthly salary, rikishi are eligible to receive monetary awards based on their performance in tournaments. These bounties are paid six times a year, at each tournament, to sekitori-ranked wrestlers (competing in the jūryō division or higher). Wrestlers in the makushita division and below do not receive a salary, though they are given an allowance.

Since the most common way to increase the bounties is to achieve kachi-koshi (having more wins than losses) in a tournament, a match in which a wrestler stands at seven wins and seven losses on the final day of a tournament will decide whether he achieves kachi-koshi or make-koshi (more losses than wins). This occurrence is sometimes referred to as kyūkin sumō (給金相撲; lit. "wage sumo"); a win in these circumstances is called kyūkin naoshi (給金直し; lit. "wage correction"), and a loss is called mukō kyūkin (向こう給金; lit. "opposite side wage").

The yokozuna with the smallest bounty was the 60th yokozuna Futahaguro, who never won a championship. Having been in the makuuchi ranks for only 20 tournaments, he had received only ¥169 at the time of his expulsion.

== Calculation ==
Minimum values
Rank	Mochikyūkin	Payment
Yokozuna	¥150	¥600,000
Ōzeki	¥100	¥400,000
Makuuchi	¥60	¥240,000
Jūryō	¥40	¥160,000

When a wrestler enters professional sumo, he is credited with ¥3. Every time he achieves kachi-koshi, this value increases by ¥0.5 (or 50 sen) for each additional win over the number of losses (e.g. ¥1.5 for a 9–6 record). No deduction is made for a make-koshi record, a leave of absence, or a suspension.

There are minimum values of mochikyūkin that are paid to wrestlers of different rank (jūryō, makuuchi, ōzeki and yokozuna), should they not be eligible for a greater amount already. If a wrestler is subsequently demoted, any amount awarded through these minimums in excess of that earned via the wrestler's win-loss record will be deducted again from the mochikyūkin account.

=== Bonuses ===
In addition, wrestlers with outstanding performances will receive bonuses. A maegashira will receive a ¥10 bonus if he can defeat a yokozuna during a tournament. Such a win is called a kinboshi (lit. "gold star"). Former sekiwake Akinoshima won 16 kinboshi during his career, which gave him a mochikyūkin account that was larger than those of many ōzeki.

Winning the makuuchi yūshō (championship) gives a bonus of ¥30, which increases to ¥50 if the championship was won with a "perfect" record of 15–0, which is called a zenshō yūshō (全勝優勝).

=== Conversion ===
The value of the mochikyūkin account is multiplied by a predefined number to give the actual distributed monetary bonus to the sekitori wrestlers; the current multiplier, since the year 1998, is 4,000. This means that, as an example, a kinboshi victory will be worth ¥240,000 per annum additional income for the remainder of the wrestler's career.

Evolution
Until 1969	1,000
1970–1984	1,500
1985–1997	2,500
1998–present	4,000

== Examples ==
With its strong bias towards large kachi-koshi scores and top division championships, the highest mochikyūkin accounts are credited to the strongest yokozuna. Mochikyūkin accounts of over ¥1,000 (corresponding to an additional income of ¥24 million per year) have been achieved by the very strongest yokozuna such as Taihō, Chiyonofuji and Hakuhō.

Case of Hakuhō (after the September 2021 tournament)
		Addition	Cumulative
Jonokuchi debut		¥3	¥3
Kachi-koshi as makushita and below		¥18	¥21
Promotion to jūryō	¥21 → ¥40	¥19	¥40
Kachi-koshi as jūryō		¥6	¥46
Promotion to makuuchi	¥46 → ¥60	¥14	¥60
Kinboshi	1×10=	¥10	¥102.5
Kachi-koshi from maegashira to sekiwake		¥32.5	¥102.5
Promotion to ōzeki	¥102.5 → ¥102.5	(already above ¥100) ¥0	¥102.5
Kachi-koshi as ōzeki		¥28	¥240.5
Makuuchi yūshō as ōzeki	2×30=	¥60	¥240.5
Zenshō yūshō as ōzeki	1×50=	¥50	¥240.5
Promotion to yokozuna	¥240.5 → ¥240.5	(already above ¥150) ¥0	¥240.5
Kachi-koshi as yokozuna		¥386.5	¥2,187
Makuuchi yūshō as yokozuna	27×30=	¥810	¥2,187
Zenshō yūshō as yokozuna	15×50=	¥750	¥2,187
Total			¥2,187

Hakuhō broke the record of ¥1,489 set by Taihō.

Case of Endō (after the May 2025 tournament)
		Addition	Cumulative
Makushita tsukedashi debut		¥3	¥3
Kachi-koshi as makushita and below		¥3	¥6
Promotion to jūryō	¥6 → ¥40	¥34	¥40
Kachi-koshi as jūryō		¥6.5	¥46.5
Promotion to makuuchi	¥46.5 → ¥60	¥13.5	¥60
Kinboshi	1×10=	¥10	¥81
Kachi-koshi from maegashira to sekiwake		¥11	¥81
Demotion from makuuchi	¥81 → ¥67.5	¥−13.5	¥67.5
Kachi-koshi as jūryō		¥3.5	¥71
Promotion to makuuchi	¥71 → ¥71	(already above ¥60) ¥0	¥71
Kinboshi	6×10=	¥60	¥172.5
Kachi-koshi from maegashira to sekiwake		¥41.5	¥172.5
Kachi-koshi as jūryō		¥4.5	¥177
Kachi-koshi from maegashira to sekiwake		¥4.5	¥181.5
Total			¥181.5
