= Rikishi =

Professional sumo wrestler

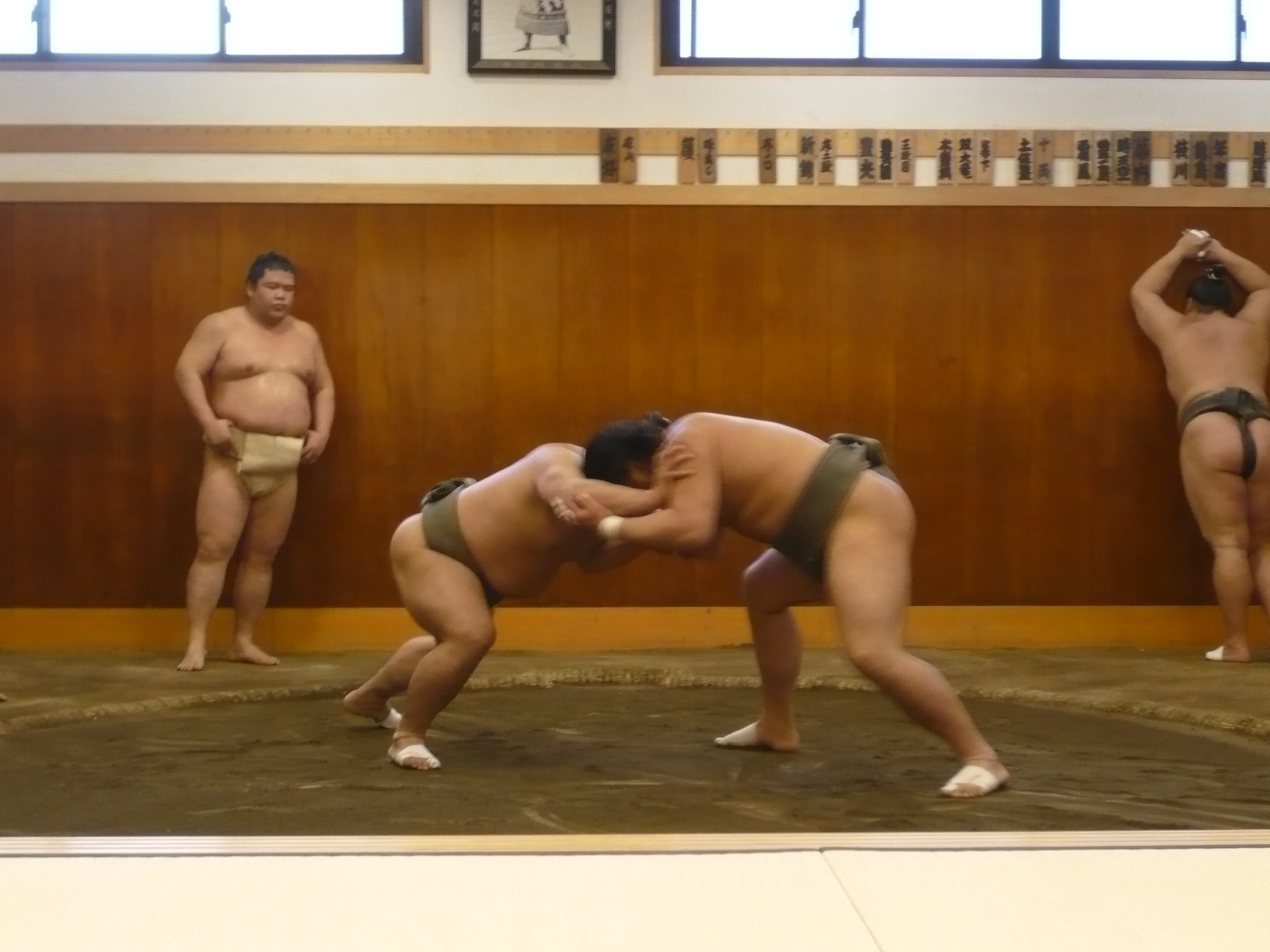
- Sumo wrestlers training in their stable in 2009

Japanese name
- Kanji: 力士
- Hiragana: りきし
- Katakana: リキシ
Transcriptions
- Romanization: Rikishi

A rikishi (力士), sumōtori (相撲取り) or, more colloquially, osumōsan (お相撲さん), is a sumo wrestler. Although used to define all wrestlers participating in sumo wrestling matches, the term is more commonly used to refer to professional wrestlers, employed by the Japan Sumo Association, who participate in professional sumo tournaments (called honbasho) in Japan, the only country where sumo is practiced professionally.

Professional rikishi follow traditions dating back to the Edo period, and therefore follow a number of codes and customs in their daily lives that distinguish them from other martial artists. Their life as professionals revolves around the observance of traditional rules that apply both to their life in the community and to the way they dress, the latter rules evolving according to the rank a wrestler has reached during his career.

Coming from many nationalities, rikishi are the only employees of the Japan Sumo Association who can run the organization once they have chosen to retire. However, only a tiny fraction of wrestlers are given this opportunity, leaving the vast majority of the sport's retirees in a precarious situation.

The number of active rikishi peaked at 943 in May 1994, at the height of the "WakaTaka boom", but had declined to 599 by January 2024. The decline in the number of recruits applying to become professionals is a major topic in sumo, as it regularly breaks records for the lowest number of recruits.

== Terminology ==
In popular use, the term rikishi refers to professional sumo wrestlers only and is an alternative term to sumotori (相撲取り, sumōtori; lit. 'sumo practitioner') or the more colloquial osumosan (御相撲さん or お相撲さん, osumōsan; lit. 'honorable Mr. Sumo'). It has been noted by authors such as Dorothea Buckingham and Mark Schilling that these terms should be preferred to 'sumo wrestler', because since sumo has little in common with Greco-Roman wrestling but more with judo or aikido, it was pointed out that it was a mistake to use the term 'wrestler' to define the competitors in sumo matches.

The two kanji characters that make up the word rikishi are that of 'strength' or 'power' (力) and 'warrior' or 'samurai' (士); consequently, and more idiomatically, the term can literally be defined as 'strongman' or 'powerful warrior'.

Sumotori is often defined as the more appropriate collective name for the wrestlers as a group or as individuals. The term itself comes from an abbreviation of the word sumo no toride (相撲の取手), used in the early Edo period to define sumo wrestlers. There is no implication of hierarchy between rikishi and sumōtori, the two terms being interchangeable. However, some wrestlers prefer to be referred to as osumōsan.

A more prestigious term referring to wrestlers who have risen to the two highest divisions (jūryō and makuuchi) also exists. The word sekitori refers to senior rikishi who have significantly more status, privilege and salary than their lower-division counterparts and excludes the lower-rankers. Wrestlers who qualify as sekitori are also given the suffix -zeki (関【ぜき】; lit. 'barrier') at the end of their name. That term, found also in the sumo terms sekitori (関取), ōzeki (大関) and sekiwake (関脇), comes from sekisho (関所), a road barrier which was used to control the movement of people from place to place within Japan. In feudal Japan, many wrestlers were recruited from the big, strong guards who manned the sekisho. Later "-zeki" came to mean an unbeaten performance.

== History ==
=== Origins of the wrestlers ===
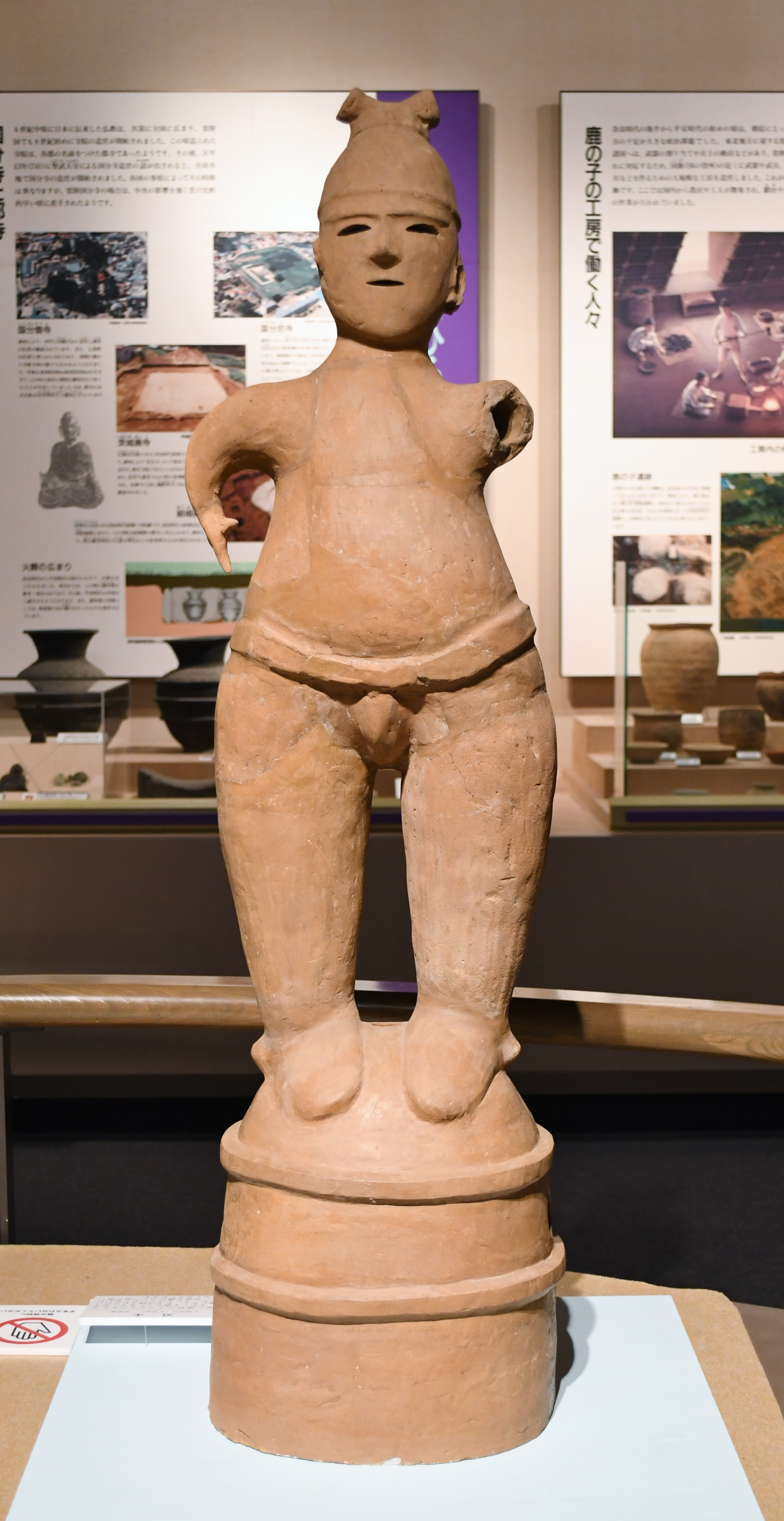
Haniwa of a sumo wrestler

Mention of wrestlers can be found in traditions predating the emergence of sumo in Japan, in traditions on the mainland of the Asian continent. In Korea, in the tombs of the T'ung-kou valley, murals depict wrestlers in loincloths seemingly performing wrestling duels for the pleasure of court nobles. Traces of wrestling activities have been demonstrated by the exhumation of haniwa pottery depicting wrestlers in Korean wrestling attire dating from the Kofun period. As sumo became embedded in Japanese myths and legends, stories of powerful wrestlers began to appear in the Nihon Shoki (one of the first historical records of Japan), and with them the first accounts of matches held during the Yamato kingship period. At the same time the function of sumo wrestler began to appear under the term sumai-bito (相撲人; lit. 'sumo person'). The latter were conscripts from the provinces sent to the Heian court as tribute organized by local governors who, in order to supply the court's festivities with participants, ordered the communities to send to the capital any man gifted in wrestling, horse-racing or archery. Although at the time wrestlers enjoyed a certain degree of recognition, with some being recruited into the palace guard; sending wrestlers was compulsory throughout the territory, and any delay was punishable by imprisonment. In 821, codes resembling the beginnings of etiquette were introduced at the court to organize the tournaments held during banquets. With the Minamoto clan's rise to power, sumo and its wrestlers began to shift their practice from a court entertainment to a real military training. During the Sengoku period, Oda Nobunaga made sumo a popular sport, aided by the emergence of large cities (like Edo, Osaka, Sendai and Nagoya), which soon began to compete with Kyoto's cultural monopoly, as it had been Japan's only metropolis. These new cultural centres saw the emergence of wrestling groups, from both the commoners and the warrior classes, who took part in festivities at shrines.

=== Edo period and sumo structuring ===
During the period of peace established under the Tokugawa shogunate, Japan experienced an unprecedented period of vagrancy for many samurai who had lost their social standing with their previous masters, who had been deposed or killed so that the shogunate could assert itself. These masterless samurai, called rōnins, could not engage in any activity under their social category under threat of punishment, and with the period of peace, it had become almost impossible to be recruited by local lords who no longer needed to build up a sizeable military retinue. During the same period, sumo was gradually establishing itself as a popular sport, and two extremes coexisted side by side. On one side, certain powerful clans (such as the Kishū Tokugawa, Maeda, Ikeda, Matsudaira, Sakai and Hosokawa) formed suites of wrestlers organized into royal households called geisha-gumi (芸者組; lit. 'geisha troupe'), and elevated them to the status of vassals. On the other, a number of rōnin had no choice but to put their martial art skills to good use in street sumo tournaments, called tsuji-sumo (辻相撲; lit. 'street-corner wrestling'), for the entertainment of passers-by. Similarly, a number of street entertainment wrestling groups formed and began touring, sometimes with the support of shrines that occasionally recruited them as part of religious festivities and to help priests raising money for the construction of buildings.

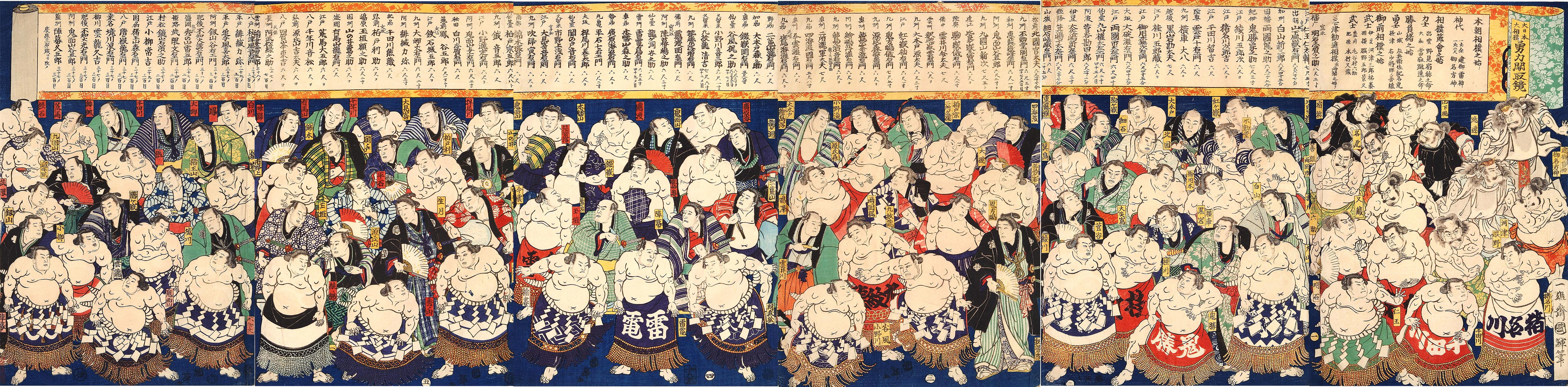
Illustration of Powerful Professional Sumo Wrestlers in Japan by Utagawa Kuniteru II (1867).

Eventually, this mix of professional wrestlers and disgraced rōnins, along with the commoners who took part in the contests of strength of the street tournaments, came into conflict over money. Tense brawls, even deaths, sometimes occurred. Public order became so disturbed by 1648 that Edo authorities issued an edict banning street sumo and matches organized to raise funds during festivities. The edicts did not stop there, however, and also had an impact on wrestlers for some thirty years, with the publication of an order banning the use of shikona, or ring name, a tradition observed since the Muromachi period. At the same time, instructions sent out to local lords advised drastic savings on suite costs, and the maintenance and recruitment of vassalized wrestlers ceased altogether. Over the next two decades or so, the wrestlers, now without any income, decided to petition the authorities to lift the bans, forming coalitions of interests to protect themselves from any violent repression of their movement.

In 1684, a rōnin named Ikazuchi Gondaiyū (雷 権太夫), leader of one of these coalitions, obtained permission to hold a tournament after proposing a new etiquette associated with matches organization. In fact, the systematization of sumo in Edo (with the introduction of the first dohyō and the strict use of the forty-eight first kimarite) went hand in hand with the authorization of sumo tournaments. As sumo inevitably became systematized, new wrestler ranking systems were put in place with the development of the use of banzuke and the introduction of the ranks of komusubi, sekiwake and ōzeki.

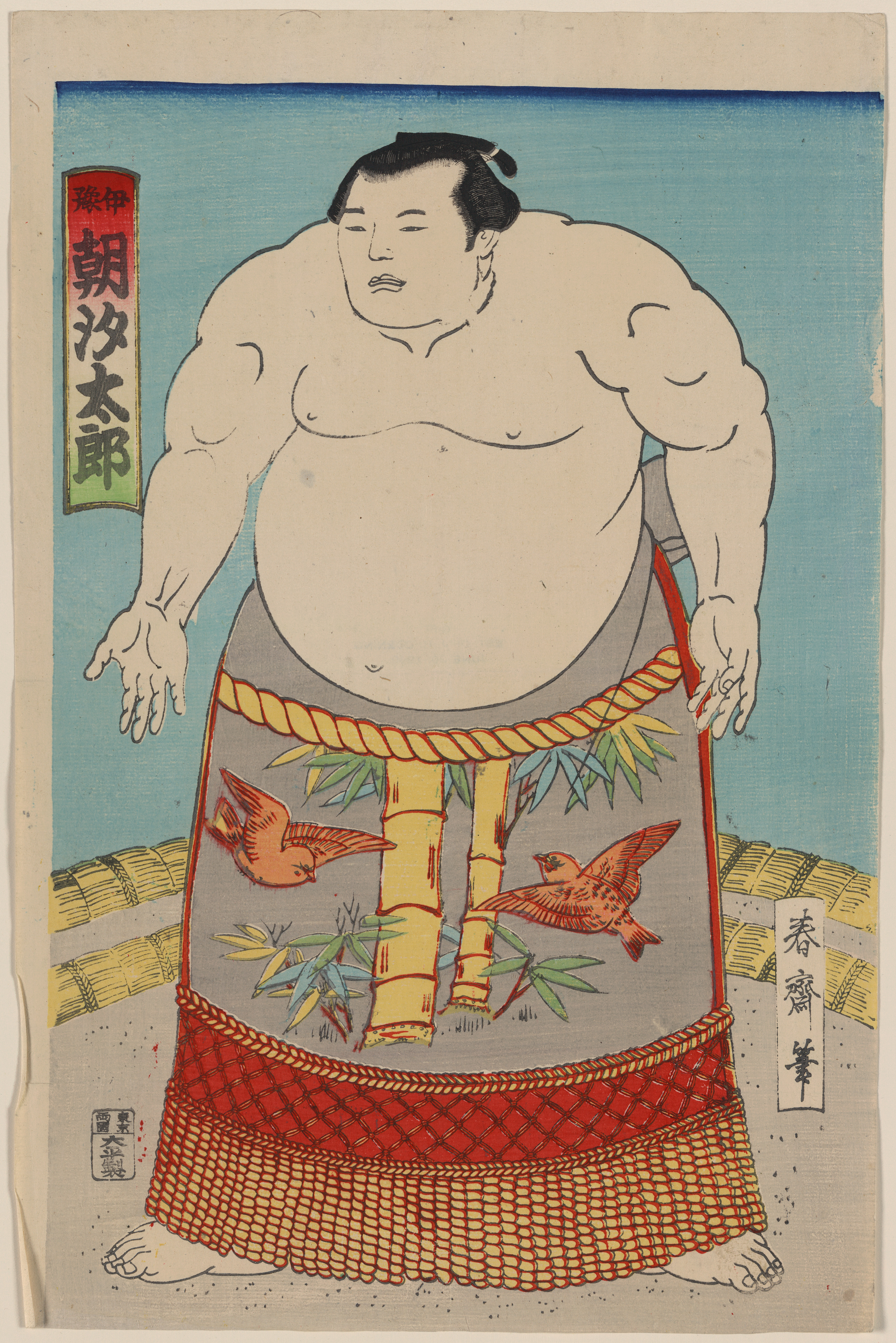
Ōzeki Asashio Tarō I with his keshō-mawashi bearing the "sparrows and bamboo" (take ni suzume) crest of the Date clan, as he wrestled under the Uwajima Domain.

Around 1717, local lords, who had ceased to maintain suites of wrestlers, revived the practice. The term rikishi also appeared at the same time, along with the more specific term kakae-rikishi (抱え力士; lit. 'embraced wrestler' or 'retained wrestler'), which referred to wrestlers attached to the patronage of local lords. With the emergence of etiquette, notable differences began to emerge to differentiate retainers of local lords from wrestlers who were not under the protection of a patron. Kakae-rikishi were allowed to carry two swords, while wrestlers without patrons carried only one, or even a dagger. Wrestlers who took part in tournaments without the patronage of lords did not yet have samurai status or a salary and their finances depended largely on donations they could receive from the organizers of charity tournaments or admirers. Their participation was motivated in particular by the fact that they could be scouted by the lords' households, if their results or popularity were worthwhile, and by the fact that they were fed and housed for the duration of the tournament. In those days the promotion system was decided by the tournament organizers who then distributed the profits to the elders who then redistributed funds to their wrestlers, with the wrestlers under the protection of the lords receiving bonuses and having financial security and the others being kept in poverty.

The lords' wrestlers were given samurai status and a salary. They were allowed to participate as special guests in official tournaments organized with the approval of shrine authorities. During these tournaments, they represented the power of the domain in whose name they wrestled, and wore the lords' symbols on large aprons called keshō-mawashi. As representatives of their domains, wrestlers attended tournament matches at the foot of the ring, and made a point of contesting decisions unfavorable to their lords, as part of rivalries between clans. To avoid confrontations, it became customary to declare draws or postpone the decision on the outcome of a match.

Since professional sumo was intrinsically linked to the domains of the local lords, the sport also reflected their health and the political situation in Japan. During the Tenpō era, the feudal system was shaken by famine and rebellions, and the wrestlers who took part in the tournaments gradually withdrew to perform their duties at the households of the daimyo who maintained them. With this lack of the most popular figures, the public gradually deserted the tournaments, leading to a recession within the sumo associations. During the bakumatsu period, the feudal system collapsed, leading to a period of uncertainty about the future of the sport and therefore of wrestlers. Nevertheless, sumo had succeeded in establishing itself as a popular sport, recognized as the national sport, leading to the survival of the wrestlers' status.

=== Meiji Restoration and social movements ===
With the Meiji Restoration and the abolition of the han system, wrestlers lost the patronage of the lords, who could no longer maintain households of their own. With the loss of income security and social status came a period of semi-censorship of sumo, with the adoption of Western ideology leading to the perception of sumo as unworthy of the new era, as the matches were seen as barbaric and the semi-nudity of the wrestlers shocking. With the disappearance of government protection, some wrestlers organized themselves into fire brigades. At the same time, political circles were organized to preserve some of Japan's indigenous traditions, saving the privilege of wrestlers to wear samurai chonmage (topknot) in 1871. With the absence of patronage on the part of the lords, a social crisis was also revealed among wrestlers, who now openly criticized the distribution of winnings from charity tournaments. When Emperor Meiji ordered a match to be held in front of him in 1884, wrestlers Umegatani I and Ōdate made such an impact on him that his attitude towards the sport was changed, and with it the attitude of imperialist groups calling for the abolition of sumo, restoring a semblance of popularity to the sport.

Although sumo itself continued, the Meiji period was also marked by the first social movements in the history of professional sumo. In the 1870s, the first wrestlers' revolt was organized by Takasago Uragorō (then still called Takamiyama) asking for better treatment (without initial success) and breaking away from the Tokyo-based association before merging again. After that initial movement, a number of reforms were introduced to adapt the competitions to Japan's new political and financial context, notably by distributing better salaries to wrestlers and basing the latter on results. Social movements in sumo did not cease, however, and in 1911 a strike by low-ranking wrestlers called for a new wage reform, securing a bonus (made up of payment in cash and a deposit in a pension fund) distributed to all wrestlers who were not ōzeki or yokozuna (professional sumo's top two ranks). In 1923, another strike known as the Mikawajima Incident demanded better pensions for wrestlers and was led by Yokozuna Ōnishiki, without success. Finally, in 1932 (Taishō era), the last major wrestlers' strike broke out with the Shunjuen Incident, calling for fundamental reform of the newly created Japan Sumo Association and leading to a mass resignation of wrestlers the likes of which professional sumo had never seen before. Eventually, the situation calmed down and sumo enjoyed a new boom in popularity, notably driven by Yokozuna Futabayama.

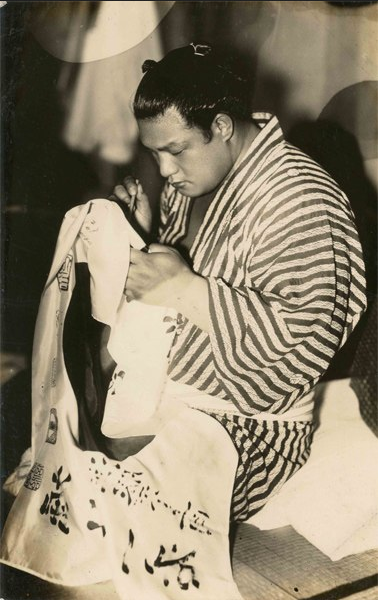
Yokozuna Futabayama signing a Good Luck Flag during the war.

During the Second Sino-Japanese War, sumo emerged as a sport of pride, driven by strong nationalist sentiment and taking hold where Western sports (such as baseball) were denounced. As ambassadors of national sentiment, sumo wrestlers were sent on tour to occupied Manchuria and China to perform in front of soldiers. With the turning point of the war in 1943, competitions were disrupted. The Tokyo bombings killed many wrestlers, and those who survived were either drafted into the army or navy, or incorporated into provincial work units. Popular figures in the sport were also forced to leave competitions, such as Tochinishiki who left the association to be drafted into the navy at Arai, Shizuoka during the 1944–1945 period; or Yoshibayama, then newly promoted in the jūryō division, who had been drafted during the 1943–1946 period and was shot in the left thigh.

In the 1960s, sumo wrestlers once again served as emblems of Japan, with the first international tours of professional sumo since the '30s. In the summer of 1965, Taihō, Kashiwado and Sadanoyama were part of a group of eight wrestlers who went to the Soviet Union at the invitation of the Russian government to perform goodwill matches. Since the wrestlers fought in mawashi (fighting loincloth), the press echoed the diplomatic rapprochement, dubbing the rikishi delegation the 'naked ambassadors.'

== Lifestyle ==
The life of a rikishi is first and foremost oriented towards strict rules of absolute obedience and respect for superiors and seniors. Revolving around a strict hierarchy that may seem "outdated" or "feudal", the sumo wrestler's life is in reality based above all else on his own personal skills, since only his results–and the guarantee of more victories than defeats at official tournaments (called honbasho)–are the guarantees of his success. With success comes progression in the sumo hierarchy, which is not as much about rank as it is about status, the rank determining dress, earnings and treatment from peers.

A professional sumo wrestler leads a highly regimented life. The Sumo Association prescribes the behavior of its wrestlers in some detail. For example, the association prohibits wrestlers from driving cars, although this is partly out of necessity as many wrestlers are too big to fit behind a steering wheel.

=== Recruits ===
Recruiting young wrestlers is an essential aspect of perpetuating the sport's wrestling pool. Since the 1970s, sumo has developed an intensive scouting system. The largest stables have established scouting networks throughout the country, partly supported with the help of their nationwide patron organizations, with retired wrestlers and patron-club members acting as part-time scouts for the stables. It is also not rare for acquaintances of the master, or one of the stable wrestlers, to also bring potential apprentices to the stable. When on provincial tours, masters always lookout for potential talent. Despite all the efforts made by masters to attract new talent, it is often the case that young wrestlers are motivated to join the stable solely by the reputation and achievements of the current master.

Since 1973, all new aspirants must have completed at least compulsory education. In the Japanese education system, it means graduating from the six years of primary school and the three years of junior high school. As of January 2024, recruits are no longer subject to physical standards. However, these had always been subject to revision, with the introduction of a minimum of 1.67 m (5 ft 5 1/2 in) and 67 kg (148 lb) in 2012, replacing the need for recruits to be a minimum 1.73 m (5 ft 8 in) tall and weigh 75 kg (165 lb) in the early 2000s. With the exception of recruitments based on special criteria, all wrestlers must be under 23 years old. Before the abolition of the height and weight prerequisite, young aspirants were subject to a physical examination to confirm that they met the minimum height and weight requirements to compete. To meet the height requirements, some recruits even injected silicone on top of their head to gain a few centimetres - a practice that is now prohibited. With the abolition of the height and weight prerequisite system, the Sumo Association now judges new recruits on the basis of an athletics test, reintroduced in April 2024 for the first time in 12 years. The test is based on seven physical tests (back strength, grip strength, repeated horizontal jump, handball throw, handstand, standing long jump and 50-meter run).

In professional sumo, the majority of new aspirants sign up in March, the end of the school year in Japan. All new wrestlers are then required to attend the Sumo School, located at the Ryōgoku Kokugikan, where they spend six months learning the basic movements as well as calligraphy, history, jinku (folk songs) and sports medicine. If a new recruit experiences a record rise and already reaches the status of sekitori before completing his course at the Sumo School, it is accepted that he may not take part in lessons, although all the wrestlers who have found themselves in this situation have decided not to make use of this right (such as Endō and Ichinojō). In 2023, Hakuōhō became the first wrestler in sumo's recorded history to earn his promotion to sekitori before attending any of the school's classes, nonetheless also deciding to participate in the lessons.

=== Ranks ===
Professional sumo classifies its wrestlers into six divisions, in addition to maezumō status, under which newcomers without tsukedachi status must first develop. In the highest division, the makuuchi, there are five ranks. A parallel status to the traditional hierarchy also exists with the status of tsukedachi. This allows wrestlers who have competed and succeeded on the national amateur scene to begin their career at a more advantageous rank in the sandanme and makushita divisions.

Statistics shows that only one wrestler in fifty makes it to the jūryō division, just one in a hundred becomes a makuuchi wrestler, and only one in four hundred makes the yokozuna rank. Hence, most wrestlers retire from professional sumo without ever having reached the salaried levels.

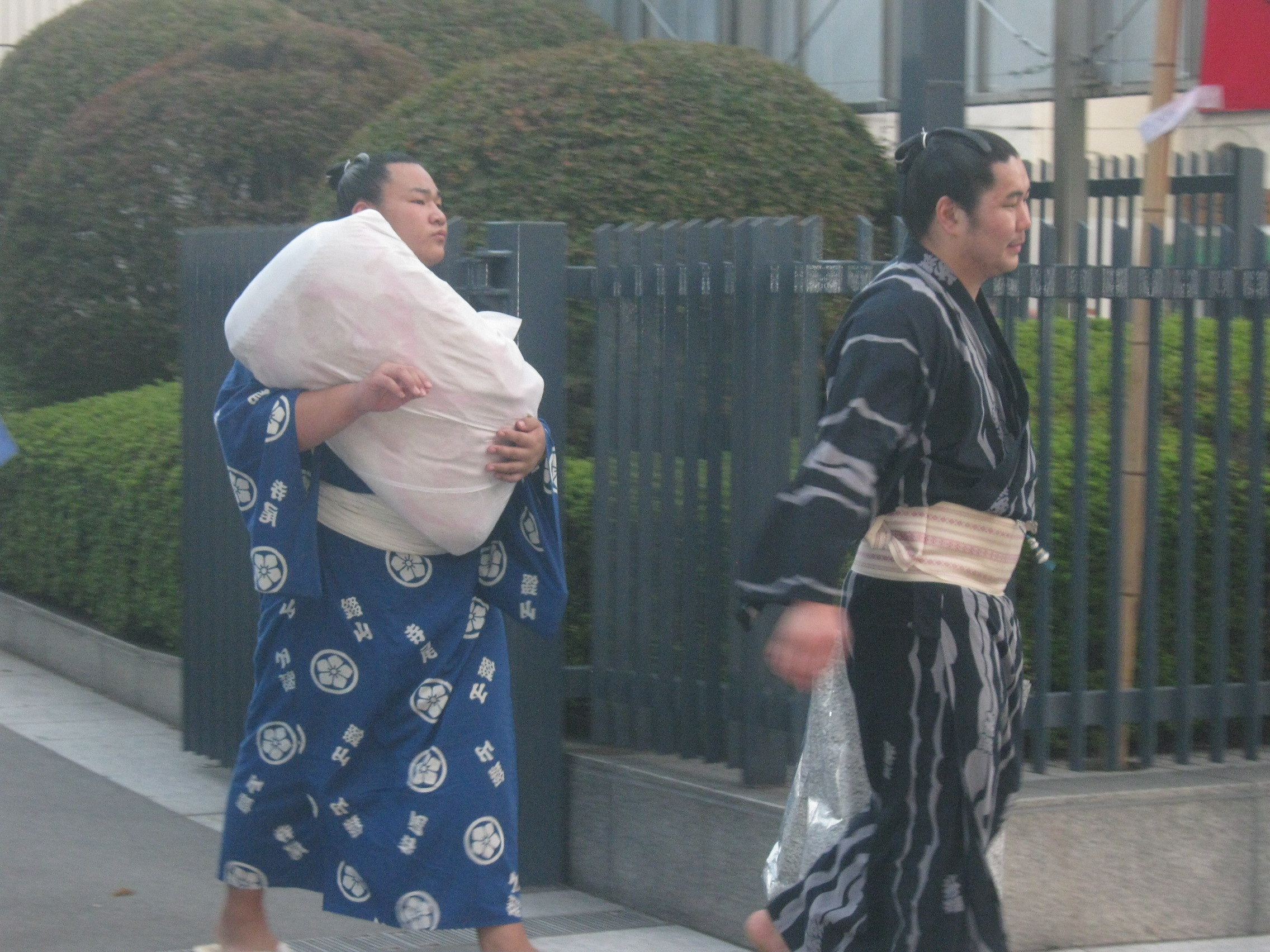
Low-ranking wrestlers carrying a sekitori's belongings (Ryōgoku Kokugikan entrance in 2009)

The lowest ranked wrestlers are expected to obey and act as assistants to their coaches and to the wrestlers ranked as sekitori, meaning every wrestler ranked in jūryō or above. In the lower divisions, however, the question of seniority and rank brings some nuances to the way wrestlers are treated. In sandanme, the wrestlers no longer have to perform the most thankless tasks and have a few extra freedoms within the stable. In the division above, in makushita, the wrestlers have even more rights and are considered experienced enough to teach the basics to young wrestlers. When they retire, wrestlers who have reached makushita and spent enough time in sandanme are eligible for a job offered by the Sumo Association and a retirement gratuity.

In the stable, the senior wrestlers (even lower-ranked ones) have authority over their juniors and win the title of anideshi (兄弟子; lit. 'big brother'), allowing them to exercise authority, notably during training, over their otōtodeshi (弟弟子; lit. 'little brother'); meaning every wrestler with less seniority than them. However, anideshi exercise their authority in a brutal manner, and many of the violent scandals in professional sumo are their fault.

When a wrestler reaches the jūryō ranks, he becomes a sekitori and his daily life changes completely, with his daily needs taken care of for him. The difference in treatment between wrestlers classified as sekitori and those who are not is such that an expression says that the two statuses are 'like heaven and hell.' A sekitori-ranked wrestler has many privileges. He is assigned a minimum of one tsukebito (assistant) who will act as his personal servant, helping him dress and prepare, carrying his belongings, helping him bathe, acting as a secretary or running specific errands on behalf of his superior. The higher a sekitori climbs in the hierarchy, the more assistants he is entitled to. Wrestlers who qualify as sekitori have the additional privileges. These include having their name hand-painted with that of their sponsor on nobori (tall banners), which are then erected at the entrance to tournament arenas during honbasho. Around the ring, sekitori are entitled to a number of small perks, such as personalized towels during pre-bout preparations. While waiting for their match, wrestlers ranked in the makuuchi division are entitled to their own personalized waiting zabuton (cushion). These, often donated by sponsors, are made of silk with about 20 cm of padding and bear the wrestler's name. Backstage, the wrestlers are distributed in the preparation rooms according to their rank, the higher ranked a wrestler is, the further away from the door he is. At the top of the hierarchy, a yokozuna is installed at the end of the room. To transport their personal belongings, sekitori use an akeni, a bamboo and washi luggage box dating back to the Edo period. Each wrestler has an akeni bearing his name. At the top of the hierarchy, a yokozuna is allowed to use three, as he has more regalia.

=== Life in the stable ===
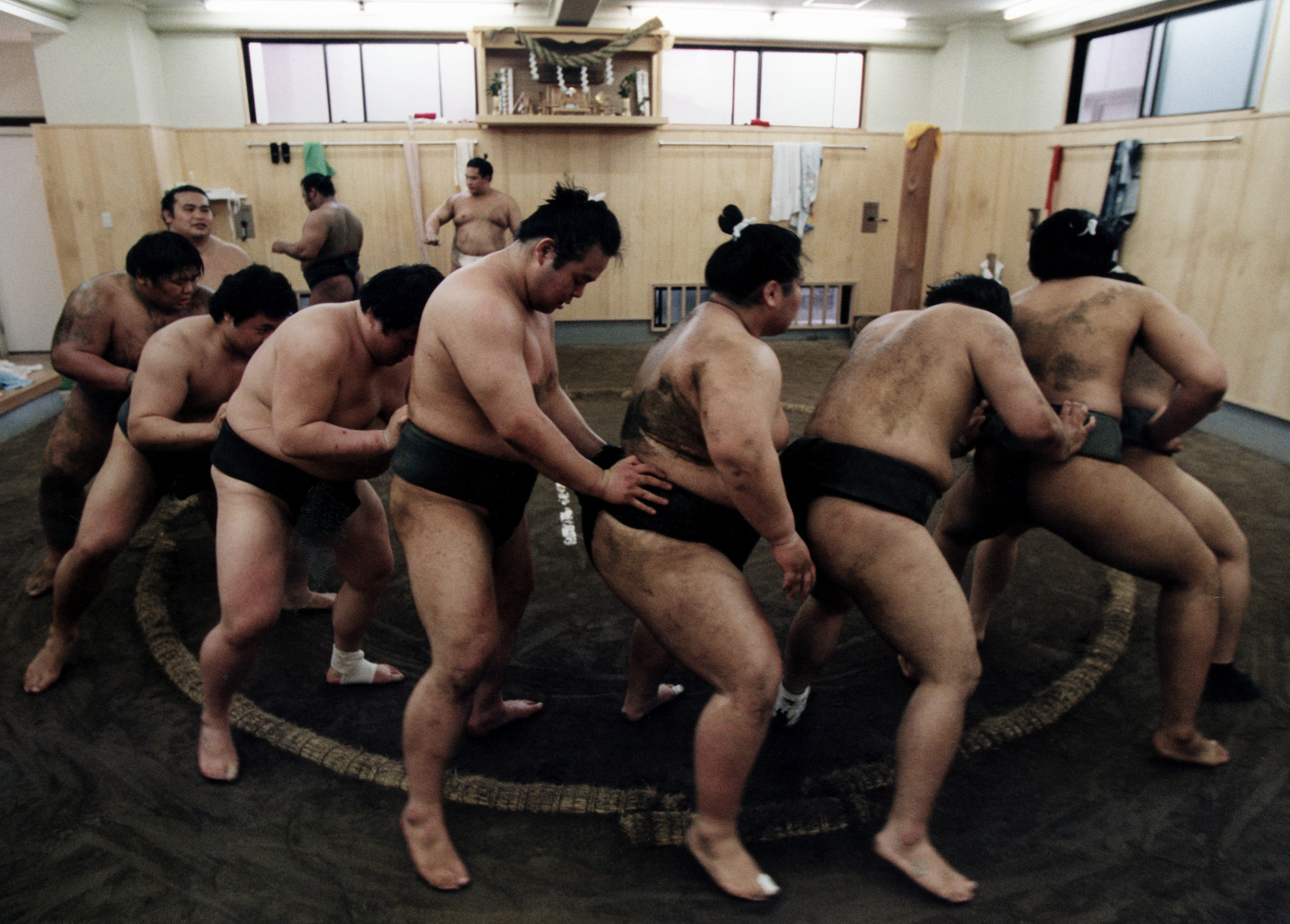
Training session in Tomozuma stable in 1998.

Sumo life centers around the training stables, to which all active wrestlers must belong. Most wrestlers, and all junior-ranked ones, live in their stable in a dormitory style: training, cleaning, eating, sleeping and socializing together. During training, the morning exercises done by the wrestlers are designed to exhaust wrestlers and strengthen their "fighting spirit". They are repeated every morning without exception. Since stable members live in a brotherhood similar to a family, they are forbidden to fight another member of their stable during tournaments.

How a wrestler is treated in his stable is based on his ranking. Wrestlers ranked in the lower divisions get up at dawn (usually around four or five) to do morning chores around the building and stretch in preparation for the usual empty stomach morning training. Within the heya, they are tasked with preparing the meal very early, before going to train. The lowest-ranked wrestlers begin training first, before being joined by their seniors and the stablemaster, who only appears when the wrestlers ranked in sandanme begin training. On the contrary, sekitori-ranked wrestlers always turn up last and their assistants have to temporarily leave the training to help them put on their mawashi. On their arrival at the training hall, sekitori are systematically greeted by wrestlers of lower rank than themselves.

After training, wrestlers will take their baths in turn by order of rank, the highest-ranked starting first so that the sekitori always benefit from a clean bathroom. Meanwhile, the stable lower-ranked begin to prepare the meal, usually the first of the day. Wrestlers then eat by turns according to rank, each being served by another wrestler belonging to a rank lower than his own. The lowest ranks must patiently and hungrily wait until all of the others have finished and gone to have a nap. This regimen of no breakfast and a large lunch followed by a sleep is intended to help wrestlers put on a lot of weight so as to compete more effectively. Sumo wrestlers also drink large amounts of beer.

=== Clothing and physical appearance ===
Rikishi are bound by strict traditional dress codes. As they advance in their careers, wrestlers earn the right to wear certain clothing and accessories, meaning a wrestler's appearance generally indicates his rank. Wrestlers' dress codes have changed over the years. Before the Heian period, the wrestlers came to the ring with distinctive flower crowns to distinguish wrestlers from the eastern team (alcea flowers) and those on the western team (calabash flowers). This practice later gave its name to the hanamichi (花道; lit. 'Flower path'), the two corridors through which wrestlers enter the ring. Wrestlers also wore loose-fitting front loincloths similar to fundoshi but called tosagi.

Today's wrestlers are expected to wear the chonmage and traditional Japanese dress at all times when in public. It is common for wrestlers to receive their clothes as gifts.

The jūryō-ranked wrestlers and above have the right to wear formal costumes. It includes the right to wear hakama pants and crested kimono and jacket (respectively called montsuki kimono and haori montsuki) fastened by a himo, a braided cord.

In makuuchi, wrestlers can wear "somenuki yukata". Somenuki (染抜き or 染め抜き; lit. 'without dyeing') is a technique for removing the dye colour that can be adapted to any shape and considered to be of a higher-rank than simply sewing or embroidering the symbols a posteriori. The technique later gave its name to the clothing because the name of the wrestlers always appear in a different colour than that of the textile.

During their bouts, wrestlers also wear distinctive loincloths (called mawashi) which are also subject to rules depending on the said wrestler's rank. Since colors fade over time, it is also easy to recognize a wrestler who is more senior than another of equivalent rank by the color of their loincloth, the most senior wrestlers having yellowed (for sekitori) and faded (for makushita and below) loincloths over the years.

In Tokyo, the districts hosting wrestling stables have made a specialty of selling large kimonos adapted to the rikishi's physique.

Wrestlers are entitled to clothing rights. These accumulate as follows (from their beginnings to the highest ranks):

Ranks		Clothing	Obi belt	Footwear	Accessories	Mawashi
Toriteki-ranked wrestlers	Jonokuchi	Yukata	Crêpe-made or polyester obi belts	Geta sandals and bare feet	None	In training: cotton-made and black During tournaments: coloured sagari (of the wrestler's choice) are inserted into the training mawashi
Toriteki-ranked wrestlers	Jonidan	Yukata	Crêpe-made or polyester obi belts	Geta sandals and bare feet	None	In training: cotton-made and black During tournaments: coloured sagari (of the wrestler's choice) are inserted into the training mawashi
Toriteki-ranked wrestlers	Sandanme	Kimono and simple haori surcoat (only for official occasions)	Crêpe-made or polyester obi belts	Enamelled setta sandals and black tabi socks	None	In training: cotton-made and black During tournaments: coloured sagari (of the wrestler's choice) are inserted into the training mawashi
Toriteki-ranked wrestlers	Makushita	Hand-made cloak and muffler	Silk-made and patterned belts (hakata-ori)	Enamelled setta sandals and black tabi socks	Oil-paper umbrella and scarf	In training: cotton-made and black During tournaments: coloured sagari (of the wrestler's choice) are inserted into the training mawashi
Sekitori-ranked wrestlers	Jūryō	Crested haori (called montsuki-haori) and hakama pants	Silk-made and patterned belts (hakata-ori)	Tatami-setta and white tabi socks	Oil-paper umbrella and scarf	In training: cotton-made and white During tournaments: colourful silk mawashi known as shimekomi with seaweed-stiffened sagari
Sekitori-ranked wrestlers	Makuuchi	Somenuki-style yukata with the wrestler's name and personalised designs	Silk-made and patterned belts (hakata-ori)	Tatami-setta and white tabi socks	Oil-paper umbrella and scarf	In training: cotton-made and white During tournaments: colourful silk mawashi known as shimekomi with seaweed-stiffened sagari

The Japan Sumo Association is also able to regulate the physical appearance of its wrestlers. Rikishi are expected to grow their hair long, in order to be worn in a style of chonmage, a topknot similar to the samurai hairstyles of the Edo period. Young wrestlers wear a simplified version, while wrestlers ranked in the two highest divisions (jūryō and makuuchi) wear a more elaborate version called ōichōmage (大銀杏髷; lit. 'ginkgo-leaf topknot') because it resembles the leaf of the ginkgo tree.

The association's statutes stipulate that wrestlers "must keep their bodies clean". For this reason, the Sumo Association has banned the wearing of beards since 2019, judging that it made wrestlers' appearance too dirty. It was common at the time for wrestlers to allow themselves to grow a designer stubble during tournaments out of superstition, fearing that shaving during a winning streak would attract bad luck and put an end to it. The wearing of sideburns was however preserved. Similarly, wrestlers are expected to cut their fingernails short and tattoos are prohibited.

=== Salary ===
Professional sumo wrestlers only began to be paid according to a wage system in May 1957. Only wrestlers ranked jūryō and above receive a monthly salary. All wrestlers ranked below are given no monthly wages but receive a more modest allowance during the tournaments. Compensation paid to lower-ranked wrestlers varies according to their rank. In addition, the salary received by sekitori also depends on the division in which they wrestle and their rank. In addition, sumo wrestlers benefit from favourable tax treatment. For example, they are exempt from paying taxes on cash gifts received from individual supporters, although the gifts they receive from corporate supporters are taxed. They are also subject to more advantageous income tax laws, which means that wrestlers are taxed less for the same salary than someone who is not involved in professional sumo.

However, compared to other popular sports in Japan, particularly baseball, professional sumo seems to pay its athletes poorly, with the maximum annual salaries and bonuses capped at around ¥36 million, while in other sports athletes easily reach ¥100 million a year. According to former Gagamaru and Tochinoshin, Yokozuna Hakuhō (sumo's most successful wrestler) earned around ¥100 million a year (about US$646,840 and €607,200 as of April 2024) during his active years, all bonuses included. In addition, there is no pension fund as such in professional sumo. Wrestlers depend almost exclusively on the earnings generated by their success in the ring.

Wrestlers who are not sekitori earn allowance at tournaments as follows:

- Makushita: ¥165,000
- Sandanme: ¥110,000
- Jonidan: ¥88,000
- Jonokuchi: ¥77,000

Since the January 2019 tournament, the monthly salary figures for the top two divisions are:

- Yokozuna: ¥3 million
- Ōzeki: ¥2.5 million
- Sekiwake and Komusubi: ¥1.8 million
- Maegashira: ¥1.4 million
- Jūryō: ¥1.1 million

In addition to the basic salary, sekitori-ranked wrestlers also receive additional bonus income, called mochikyūkin, six times a year (once every tournament, or basho) based on the cumulative performance in their career to date. Prior to the establishment of the salary, wrestlers were exclusively paid according to this system. Wrestlers in the lower divisions earned three yen for each victory and fifty yen for each kachi-koshi score, with the amount increasing as they moved up the hierarchy. Various bonuses added at the time of promotions, championships and kinboshi were also added. Today, the mochikyūkin continues to be registered and paid, but as a complement to the salary, and the amounts have been recalculated.

Yokozuna receive an additional allowance every two tournaments, associated with the making of a new tsuna belt worn in their ring entering ceremony. Wrestlers who place in the san'yaku category also receive bonuses. Also, prize money is given to the winner of each divisional championship, which increases from ¥100,000 for a jonokuchi victory up to ¥10 million for winning the top division. In addition to prizes for a championship, wrestlers in the top division giving an exceptional performance in the eyes of a judging panel can also receive one or more of three special prizes (sanshō), which are worth ¥2 million each.

Individual top division matches can also be sponsored by companies, with the resulting prize money called kenshōkin. For bouts involving yokozuna and ōzeki, the number of sponsors can be quite large, whereas for lower-ranked matchups, no bout sponsors may be active at all unless one of the wrestlers is particularly popular, or unless a company has a policy of sponsoring all his matchups. As of 2019, a single sponsorship cost ¥70,000, with ¥60,000 going to the winner of the bout and ¥10,000 deducted by the Japan Sumo Association for costs and fees. Immediately after the match, the winner receives an envelope from the referee with half of his share of the sponsorship, while the other half is put in a fund for his retirement.

=== The rikishi-kai ===
The question of wages for professional wrestlers led to the creation, after the Shunjuen Incident, of a wrestlers' club called rikishi-kai (力士会; lit. 'sumo wrestlers association'). Only salaried wrestlers belong to this group. The organization meets six times a year at the venue of the upcoming tournament, the day after the banzuke is published.

Traditionally, wrestlers have used a representative to informally pass requests, particularly in relation to wages, to the elders sitting on the Board of Directors. The association does not recognize the rikishi-kai as a union in the strict sense of the term. The organization is best described as a mutual aid organization, where members set up savings funds for retirement and organize contributions for retirement events. Relations between the rikishi-kai and the association's directors are therefore often compared to those between a child asking his parents for pocket money. It is common for wrestlers' demands to be ignored, and for them not to push the issue any further. In his memoirs, former sekiwake Takamiyama wrote that in the rikishi-kai meetings, the sekitori sometimes joked about a collective strike, but the action was rarely, if ever, considered. The organization often uses its meetings to present financial reports or discuss awareness-raising topics. However, in 2011, the rikishi-kai discussed the possibility of boycotting the 2011 May tournament after the association called for the retirement of several wrestlers implicated in the match-fixing scandal. Kaiō, who was the organization's coordinator at the time, managed to calm things down.

In the past, the organization was responsible for organizing events that attracted a lot of public attention, such as costume carnivals and tug-of-war and running competitions. These events have gradually disappeared due to the risk of injury, although there have been several calls to bring them back.

Traditionally, the rikishi-kai is represented by top-ranked wrestlers, notably yokozuna, although in the past several intermediaries between the association and the rikishi-kai have been lower-ranked wrestlers (such as Fujinishiki or Aonosato). Since Yokozuna Kakuryū's retirement in 2021, the presidency of the rikishi-kai is currently vacant.

=== Punishments ===
The Japan Sumo Association's statutes set out disciplinary measures for its wrestlers. These have been subject to change over time, mainly in the 2010s, after match-fixing and gambling scandals. Until 2014, punishments consisted of five levels, to which was added a so-called "extraordinary" level. The wrestlers were subject to (from lightest to heaviest punishment): reprimand, salary reduction, suspension, demotion and dismissal. An extraordinary sanction (the expulsion) was then eventually added to the dismissal that allowed the association to dismiss a wrestler without retirement pay. The expulsion was the most severe sanction in the disciplinary statutes. This required a three-quarters vote in favor from the board of directors, composed at the time of the directors, tate-gyōji as well as yokozuna and ōzeki. Since the founding of the All Japan Sumo Association in 1925, no wrestler had ever been expelled from the association. The only cases of expulsion was in 1873, with Koyanagi and Takasago. Following the 2011 match-fixing scandal, 23 wrestlers were however expelled from the association. Although marking a historic milestone, the disciplinary decision also embroiled the association in a legal battle with Sōkokurai, the latter setting a precedent in the association's history by attacking and winning in court against the association in order to be reinstated.

In January 2014, the association shifted to a Public Interest Incorporated Foundation and the disciplinary statutes were amended, removing the sanction of expulsion and adding a recommendation to retire before the ultimate sanction of dismissal. In 2018, the sumo association also clarified its disciplinary rules, establishing a system for increasing penalties according to the rank of the concerned wrestler. On the subject of violence, a yokozuna involved will therefore be subject to a sanction at least equal to a recommendation to retire due to their "social responsibility", a sekitori will not have sanctions lower than a suspension when makushita wrestlers or lower normally risk a suspension at the most, although there have been cases of wrestlers ranked as sandanme that have already been recommended for retirement.

== Retirement ==
=== Retirement ceremonies ===
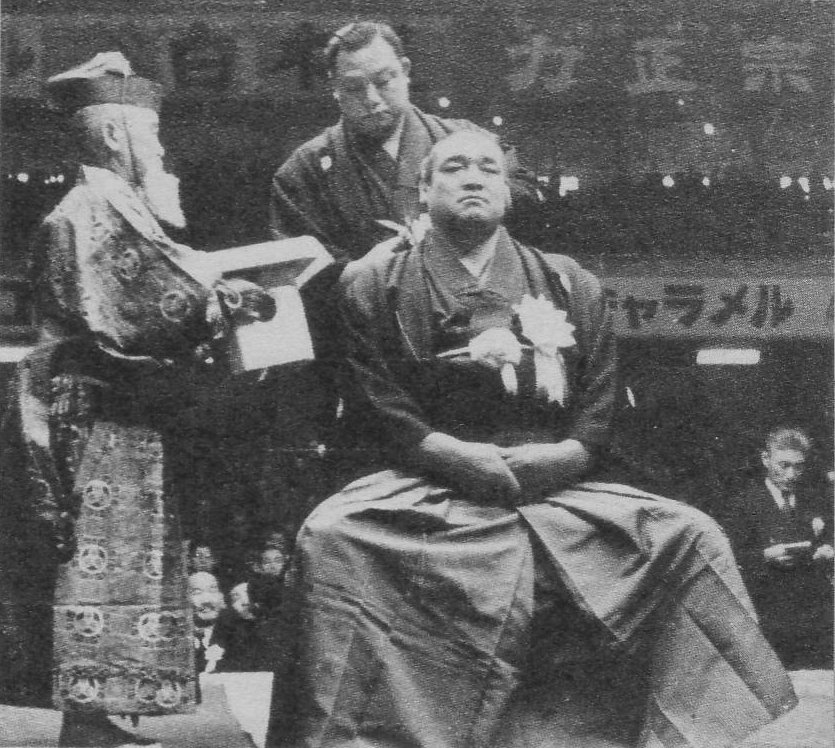
Haguroyama's retirement ceremony (danpatsu shiki) in 1954.

When a rikishi retires as an active wrestler, he symbolically marks the end of his career by cutting his chonmage topknot, symbolizing his traditional samurai rank and his career as a wrestler. The cutting of the topknot takes place in a dedicated ceremony called danpatsu-shiki (断髪式; lit. 'hair-cutting ceremony'), even if the rikishi actually retire several months before the ceremony takes place.

The ceremony is regularly held to mark a wrestler's retirement, with lower-ranked wrestlers having a more discreet ceremony often held at the usual end-of-tournament parties. For the top-ranked wrestlers, however, the ceremony takes the form of charity tournaments, with non-stake matches, presentations of traditional sumo-related arts and performances by prestigious guests. The ceremony closes with the actual cutting of the topknot, where the wrestler's guests— all having to pay a symbolic participation fee —follow in succession to cut only a few strands of his hair with gold-plated scissors. Traditionally, the last hairs holding the topknot together are cut by the retiring wrestler's master. It is also customary for a retired wrestler to keep his severed topknot in a box or glass case after the ceremony.

The danpatsu-shiki ceremony can take place anywhere (and is often held in hotels), but a wrestler must have served at least thirty tournaments as a sekitori to perform his ceremony at the Ryōgoku Kokugikan.

=== Post-retirement career ===
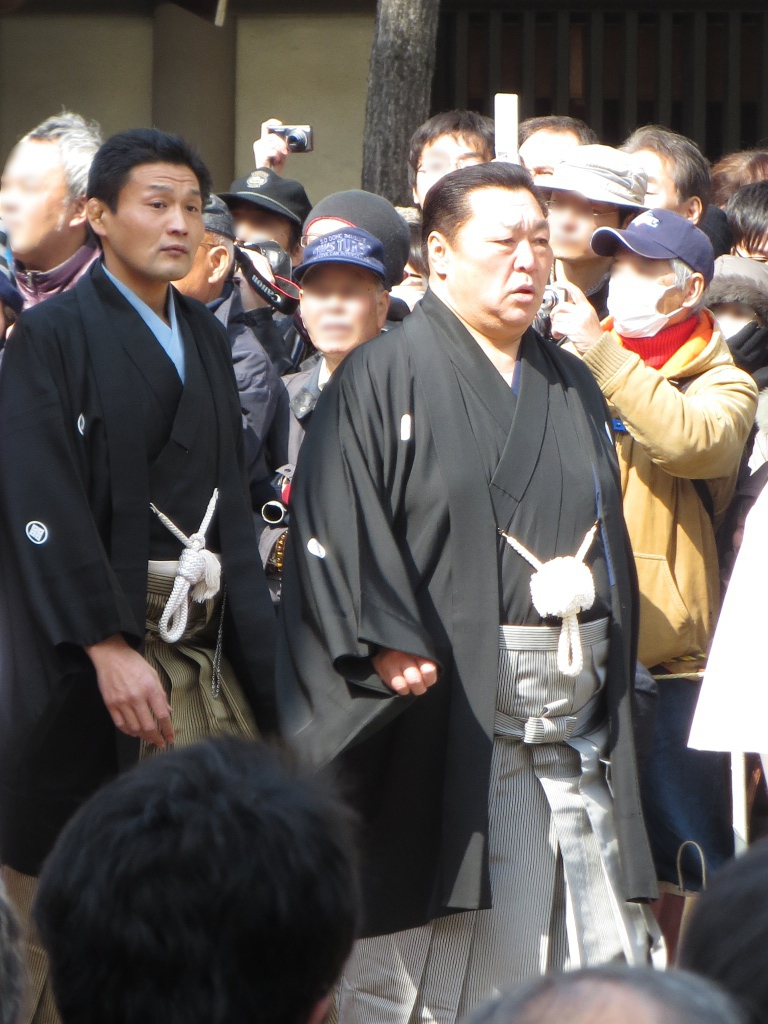
Former yokozuna Takanohana (left) and Kitanoumi as toshiyori, or elders (2013).

Sumo wrestlers who retire can take on responsibilities within the Japan Sumo Association. Wrestlers who become managers are called toshiyori, more commonly known as oyakata and translated into English as 'elder' or 'master.' Becoming an elder ensures that the retired wrestler will become one of the 105 coaches of the association, responsible for training the wrestlers and for running the association.

Qualifications for becoming a master are determined by regulations: yokozuna, ōzeki, and san'yaku only need one tournament at this rank to be considered for elder status. Wrestlers who have reached the rank of maegashira must have maintained it for twenty tournaments, while jūryō wrestlers must have maintained their rank for thirty tournaments. Yokozuna and ōzeki receive preferential treatment and can remain in the association without acquiring elder status for five years (yokozuna) and three years (ōzeki).

Wrestlers who have attained the rank of makushita and who have not been sufficiently active in jūryō may carry out subordinate functions within the association as wakamonogashira (若者頭; youth leaders) or sewanin (世話人; caretakers). These retired wrestlers serves as functionaries of the association, typically working at their former stables or within the associated ichimon (clan). Wakamonogashira are tasked to arrange maezumō matches and supervising young sumo wrestlers from makushita and below. Sewanin are the transportation and storage managers of the association's equipments.

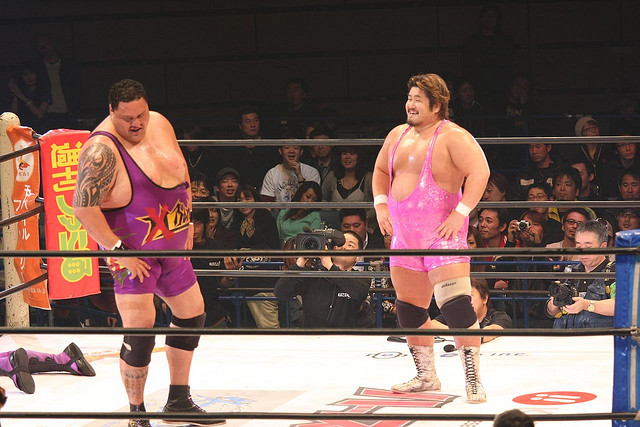
Former yokozuna Akebono (left) after his retirement and Yutaka Yoshie in Hustle (2008).

However, the vast majority of retiring wrestlers do not remain in positions within the Sumo Association. The luckiest manage to maintain their public profile by becoming TV personalities, sports commentators or actors. Most of them find themselves in activities unrelated to sumo and with no professional experience, having become wrestlers before their twenties and having had no other activities. This makes their situation complex, as when they enter the job market they find themselves competing with other employees of the same age group who do, however, have much more professional experience. Most of the time, retirees have no savings because they have not been able to secure a salary by reaching one of the two sekitori divisions. If they retire after an injury, it is all the more difficult to find work. Because they have no experience, most former wrestlers who find work also usually earn less than others in the same occupation. Most retirees find work in activities related to either cooking or physical labor, such as foodservices, care for the elderly and sports coaching. The majority find work in chankonabe restaurants, putting to good use the techniques they had learned while preparing meals in the stables.

Some former sumo wrestlers tried their luck competing in mixed martial arts or professional wrestling, with limited achievements. Sumo wrestlers who have fought in mixed martial arts include Akebono Tarō, Alan Karaev, Baruto Kaito, Henry Armstrong Miller, Kōji Kitao, Ōsunaarashi Kintarō, Tadao Yasuda, Takanofuji Sanzō, Teila Tuli and Wakashoyo Shunichi.

== Numbers ==
Professional sumo has always had more wrestlers during periods of great rivalry between champions, with the record number of new apprentices taking the entrance exam set in 1958, at the height of the HakuHō era (柏鵬時代), with 250 successful candidates. At the peak of the WakaTaka boom (若貴ブーム), in 1992, 160 people were recruited in March alone. At the beginning of the 90s, professional sumo divisions numbered around 900 rikishi, hitting a record-high of 943 wrestlers in the 1994 May tournament.

In the 2020s, however, professional sumo is struggling to recruit. The number of newcomers to the sport has never been so low since the introduction of the six-tournament-a-year system. In the early 2020s, professional sumo recorded a decline of more than thirty percent in the number of wrestlers, reaching only 665 competitors in 2022. In November 2023 it was revealed that the total number of young recruits who had taken the professional exams during the whole year was 53, beating the record low of 56 new recruits having turned professional after the revelations of the 2012 match-fixing scandal. At the first tournament in 2024, the number of wrestlers even fell to 599, dropping below 600 active wrestlers for the first time in 45 years (at the March 1979 tournament).

The decline in the number of wrestlers is due in part to the number of scandals that have come to light in the 2010s, discouraging young aspirants from leading a life now known to be marked by hazing and violence. This drop in the number of wrestlers can also be explained by the dwindling number of amateur wrestlers who normally turn to professional sumo, whose numbers have been falling sharply over the last ten years. Japan's declining birth rate has also been cited as the reason for the drop in the number of new recruits.

Since the Sumo Association's bylaws include having "a path to sumo [...] that maintains a level of tradition and discipline that must grow," many see the difficulties in recruiting and maintaining the number of wrestlers as an attack on the perpetuation of the traditional history of sumo.

== Foreign-born rikishi ==
Professional sumo is practiced exclusively in Japan, but wrestlers of other nationalities participate. Any young man meeting the Japan Sumo Association's recruitment criteria can apply to become a rikishi. However, foreigners must have the support of two guarantors and a work visa. When officially registered on the Sumo Association's list of professional rikishi, foreign wrestlers are registered by country and not by territorial subdivision, such as prefecture of origin. It is difficult for young foreign recruits to integrate into professional sumo. No translation is provided when young recruits take part in courses at the Sumo School. To give newcomers the tools they need to integrate, the association requires a year's training at the Sumo School, instead of the 6 months normally required for Japanese recruits, so that foreigners learn Japanese cultural codes and know how to speak, read and write Japanese. Many foreigners give up out of homesickness. Those who persist generally find it very difficult to integrate into stable life, and more particularly to get used to the diet. Akebono commented that he had to forget all the codes of life he had learnt over eighteen years and relearn everything in order to adapt effectively to his way of life.

Historically, professional sumo gradually opened up to foreigners from the 1960s onwards. Before this date, foreigners had historically tried to join professional sumo. The earliest recorded attempt by a foreigner to enroll in professional sumo happened in 1885, when stablemaster Urakaze was approached by an American wrestler who wanted to join his stable, but without success because the association's statutes at the time did not clearly state that foreigners were allowed to compete as rikishi. Prior to this date, professional sumo had already recruited non-Japanese wrestlers, notably Ainus and Koreans. The former were not considered to be fully Japanese, but were referred to as coming from Japan because Hokkaido is the northernmost prefecture of Japan and Korea was part of the Japanese territory at the time. The first openly Ainu wrestler to reach the makuuchi division was Misogidori Yūji in 1966.

In the 1930s, American-Japanese Shōji Hiraga became the first foreigner to be recognized as such in the banzuke. In the 1940s, a Japanese-American, Toyonishiki, and the Korean-born Rikidōzan achieved sekitori status prior to World War II, but neither were officially listed as foreigners. In the 1970s, around thirty foreign wrestlers joined. Most of them were Koreans born in Japan. The figurehead of these wrestlers was Maenoyama, who, despite being born in Osaka and having spent his whole life in Japan, was always referred to as "the Korean" by the Japanese media. In addition, foreigners have also been the subject of debate as to whether they can attain the supreme rank of yokozuna. The most conservative commentators criticize them for their lack of typical Japanese hinkaku (品格); loosely translated as 'dignity' but meaning a balance of self-confidence, self-knowledge and self-control.

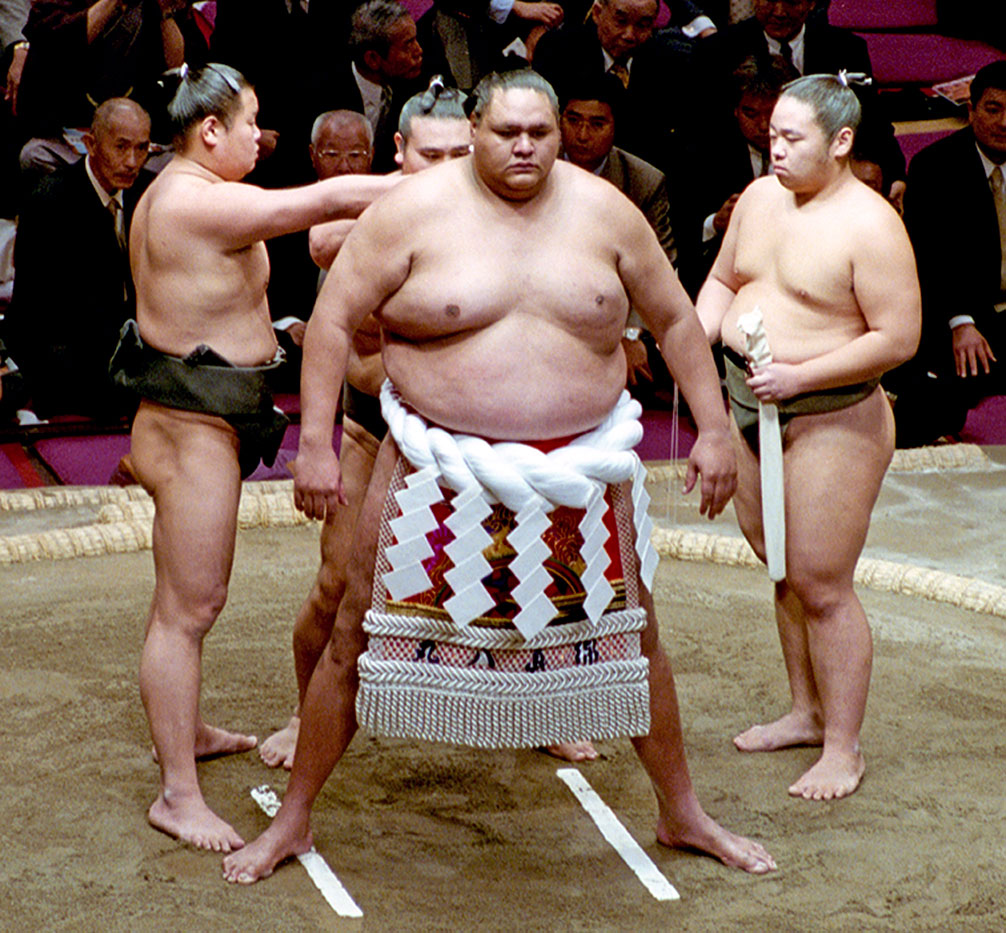
American-born Akebono was the first foreign-born rikishi to reach sumo's highest rank of yokozuna.

The first non-Asian to achieve a significant success in sumo was Hawaii-born Takamiyama. He reached the top division in 1968 and in 1972 became the first foreigner to win the top division championship, becoming the first foreign wrestler to be truly popular in Japan. Takamiyama was followed by a fellow Hawaii-born Konishiki, of ethnic Samoan descent, the first foreigner to reach the rank of ōzeki in 1987; and the Native Hawaiian Akebono, who became the first foreign-born yokozuna in 1993. Musashimaru, born in American Samoa and raised in Hawaii, became the second foreigner to reach sumo's top rank in 1999. This generation of foreign wrestlers was nicknamed kurofune (黒船; lit. 'Black Ships'), to draw a parallel with the Americans who had conquered the country during the 19th century.

Between 2003 and 2014, all four wrestlers reaching the yokozuna rank were Mongolian: Asashōryū, Hakuhō, Harumafuji and Kakuryū. In 2012, the Mongolian Kyokutenhō became the oldest wrestler in modern history to win a top division championship.

Wrestlers from Eastern European countries such as Georgia and Russia have also found success in the upper levels of sumo. In 2005, Kotoōshū from Bulgaria became the first wrestler of European birth to attain the ōzeki ranking and the first to win a top division championship.

Restrictions on the number of foreigners allowed in professional sumo began in May 1992, shortly after Ōshima stable had recruited six Mongolians at the same time. The Sumo Association's new director Dewanoumi, announced that he was considering limiting the number of overseas recruits per stable and in sumo overall. There was no official ruling at the time, but no stable recruited any foreigners for the next six years. This unofficial ban was then relaxed, but only two new foreigners per stable were allowed, until the total number reached 40. Then in 2002, a one foreigner per stable policy was officially adopted, though the ban was not retroactive, so foreigners recruited before the changes were unaffected. The move has been met with criticism, not least because Japanese society, with its centuries-old and xenophobic culture, is accustomed to treating foreign wrestlers as gaijin (外人; lit. 'outsiders' or 'aliens'), regardless of their place of birth, reinforcing the difference that the public and the media make between foreign and Japanese wrestlers. Paradoxically, all wrestlers involved in professional sumo are formally treated the same once they have joined the stables, and no distinction is clearly made as to any special treatment for foreigners. John Gunning also proposed another interpretation of the decision, claiming that this rule was not based on racist sentiment but to ensure that foreign rikishi assimilate into sumo culture. He explained, there would be ten Hawaiian wrestlers in the same stable living in their own "little clique", not learning Japanese, so the rule "protects the culture of stables."

Originally, it was possible for a place in a stable to open up if a foreign born wrestler acquired Japanese citizenship. This occurred when Hisanoumi changed his nationality from Tongan at the end of 2006, allowing another Tongan to enter his stable. However, on 23 February 2010 the Sumo Association announced that it had changed its definition of "foreign" to "foreign-born" ('gaikoku shusshin'), meaning that even naturalized Japanese citizens will be considered foreigners if they were born outside of Japan. The restriction on one foreign wrestler per stable was also reconfirmed. As Japanese law does not recognize subcategories of Japanese citizen, this unique treatment of naturalized citizens may be illegal under Japanese law. Furthermore, since 1976, if a foreigner wishes to remain in the Sumo Association after his retirement, he must give up his nationality and become a Japanese citizen.

In July 2007, there were nineteen foreigners in the top two divisions, which was the all-time record of the time with, for the first time, a majority of overseas wrestlers in the top san'yaku ranks. In June 2022 twenty-six foreign-born rikishi from nine countries were listed on the official banzuke.

== Society's perception ==
In Japan, wrestlers are perceived both as gentle giants and sex symbols.

During sumo's first golden age in the late Edo period, the Japanese collective imagination first developed an image of larger-than-life wrestlers, with a gentle character, an excessive appetite and a superhuman strength. Tales of thirteen-year-old Akashi lifting rocks to help his farmer father, Tanikaze separating two fighting bulls by grabbing them by the horns, or Shiranui lifting seven sacks of rice spread over his head and shoulders to impress Matthew C. Perry became popular myths and are credited to the wrestlers as biographical elements in their own right, like the stories of mythological heroes.

During the 1780s, wrestlers became veritable icons and card games and dolls depicting them became widespread. In order to benefit from the sport's popularity, some physically strong individuals, called kanban-ōzeki (看板大関; lit. 'billboard champions' or 'promotional ōzeki'), were introduced for the duration of one or two tournaments as wrestlers, serving as an attraction without having any real wrestling ability. Production and distribution of ukiyo-e works depicting the sport's most popular figures also became more widespread, with authors like Utagawa Kunisada and Toyokuni, Hasegawa Sadanobu or Hiroshige who gained popularity thanks to their works. Kibyōshi (picture books) and makura-e (erotic prints) were also mass-produced, with wrestlers as the central figures.

Rikishi are highly regarded by many women who consider their imposing physiques to be the epitome of masculine perfection, with their fat and athleticism being considered sexy. According to fans, these attributes combined with their fighting spirit set them apart from other Japanese men, who are perceived as being too unassertive. Starting in the 2020s, fan communities grew significantly stronger with the influx of female viewers and influencers on social media, called su-jo (スー女; sumo girls), who display their passion for sumo and wrestlers on social networks in hype videos called oshikatsu (推し活). These fans are replacing the sumo viewer base that had traditionally consisted of older people. It is not uncommon for popular wrestlers to be greeted at the entrance to the arena by groupies, whether they are elderly women or schoolgirls.

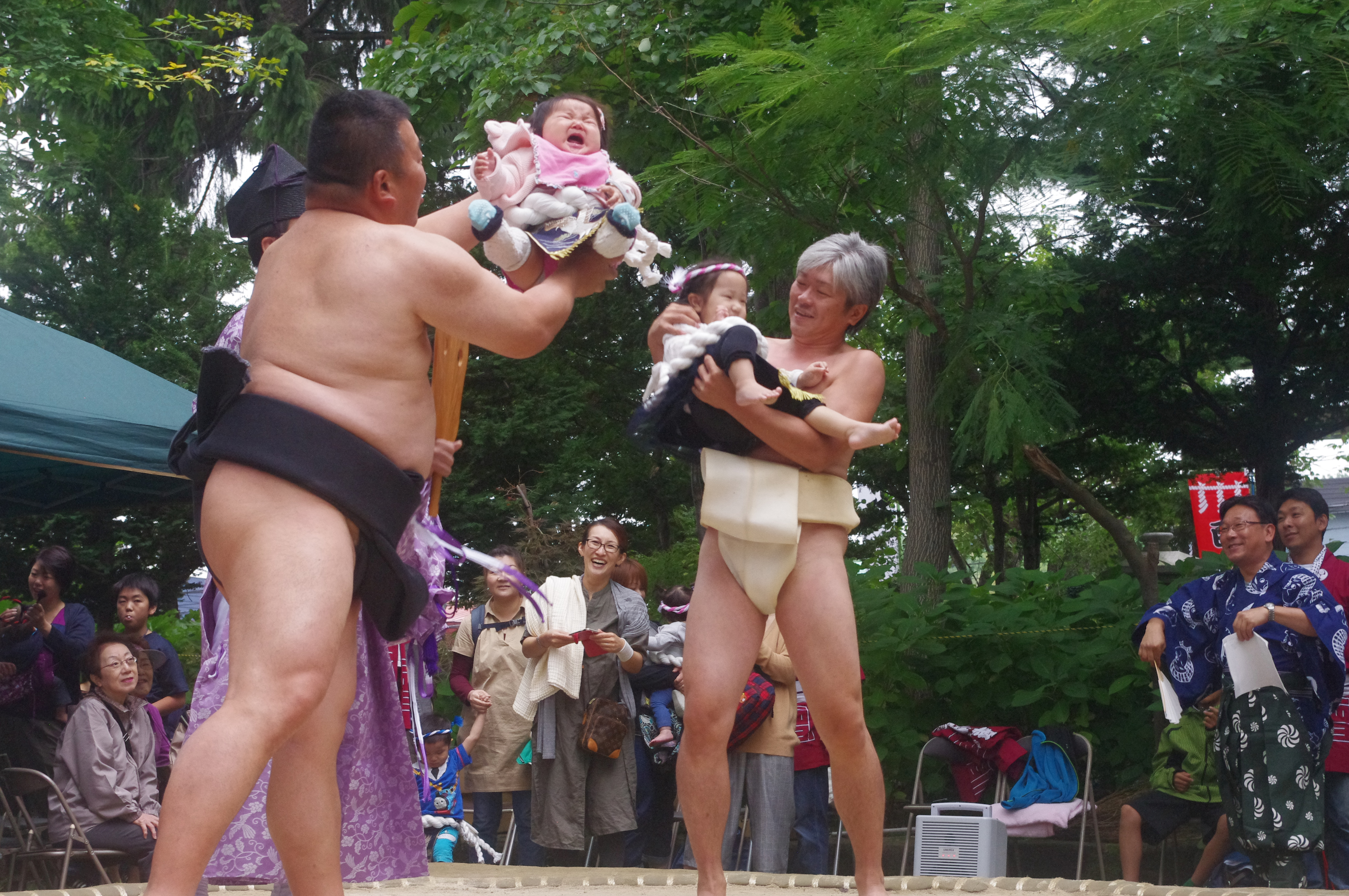
Crying baby festival held at Nishino Shrine in 2017.

The attraction to athletes for their physical appearance has not erased the links of sumo with ancient rituals for good health and good harvest that are still alive and well in contemporary times. For example, it is traditional to ask a wrestler to carry babies, so that the wrestlers can transfer their vitality to them, in the belief that the children will grow up healthy and strong. It is also traditional for children to be dressed as wrestlers so that the qualities of the latter influence them. It is also common for spectators to take advantage of the proximity of the wrestlers as they move through the hanamichi (the two paths to the ring) to touch them, in the belief that this brings good luck.

In a Japan still hit by numerous natural disasters, it is still common to see local communities requesting the performance of sumo-related rites performed by wrestlers in the belief that this will lessen the long-term effects of disasters.

== Health effects ==
In contrast to many sports where fat is seen as something to be shed, sumo instead encourages the accumulation of fat as a weapon. Since the 2000s, the standards of weight gain became less strict to try to improve the health of the wrestlers. The Sumo Association ensures the health of its wrestlers by imposing an annual medical check-up. Sumo wrestlers have a life expectancy of 65, which is 10 years shorter than that of the average Japanese male, as the diet and sport take a toll on the wrestler's body. The main health concern for wrestlers, however, remains the common cold or any other type of viral infection, which are easily transmitted in the heya (wrestlers' training quarters) environment, where the low-ranking wrestlers' dormitories are conducive to disease transmission. This ease of infection was particularly closely monitored in the context of the COVID-19 pandemic in 2020, giving rise to numerous concerns about the number of wrestlers that could be affected by the virus.

== See also ==
- Glossary of sumo terms
- Professional sumo divisions
- Sekitori
- Heya
- Mawashi
