= Umegatani Tōtarō I =

Japanese sumo wrestler

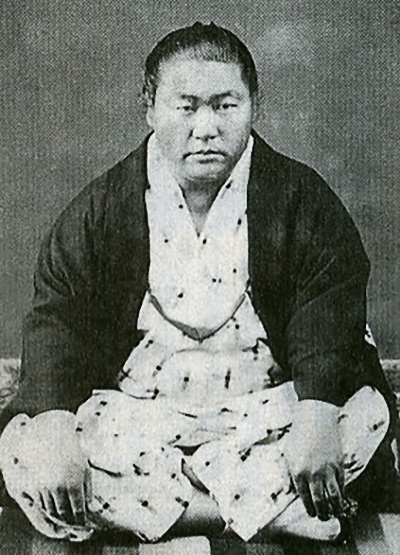

Personal information
- Native name: 梅ヶ谷 藤太郎
- Born: Oe Tōtarō; March 16, 1845 Shiwa, Chikuzen, Japan
- Died: May 15, 1928 (aged 83)
- Height: 1.76 m (5 ft 9 1/2 in)
- Weight: 105 kg (231 lb)

Sport
- Sport: Sumo
- Retired: May, 1885
- Heya: Minato → Tamagaki
- Record: 116-6-78; 18 draws-2 holds(Makuuchi)
- Debut: March, 1871
- Highest rank: Yokozuna (February, 1884)
- Elder name: Ikazuchi
- Championships: 9 (Makuuchi, unofficial)
- Updated on June 2020

Umegatani Tōtarō I (梅ヶ谷 藤太郎; March 16, 1845 – May 15, 1928) was a Japanese professional sumo wrestler from the town of Haki, Chikuzen Province, now Shiwa, Fukuoka Prefecture. He was the sport's 15th yokozuna. He was generally regarded as the strongest wrestler to emerge since the era of Tanikaze and Raiden.

== Career ==
His real name was Oe Tōtarō (小江 藤太郎). A myth attributes to him the great consumption of sake instead of mother's milk. From around the age of 12, he attended a temple school and began to wrestle, and by the time he was 16, he was known as "Chikuzen Muteki" (筑前無敵, 'invincible'). At 16, he was taken in by the Osaka Sumo Association and took the shikona, or ring name, Umegae (梅ヶ枝). After some time, he joined Minato stable and changed his ring name to Umegatani (梅ヶ谷) in honor of his hometown, Umegaya in Shiwa Village. After the Meiji Restoration of 1868, he entered the Osaka Sumo Tournament in March 1869 and was promoted to komusubi. Umegatani was not a particularly large wrestler but was remarkably strong and reached the rank of ōzeki in Osaka-sumo. Umegatani felt he wasn't content with the rank and so gave it up. He transferred to Tokyo-sumo in December 1870, and began his career over again from the bottom of the rankings. There, he was recruited into Tamagaki stable. Having deserted Osaka-sumo, he became very unpopular with the rikishi of this association. However, no one in Osaka could rival him and, in the joint tournament of December 1874, he won eight matches in a row and claimed the championship.
In 1876, while performing in Fukuoka Prefecture, he encountered rebels, which resulted in a brawl between wrestlers and rebels. Umegaya, however, remained calm and stayed in the prefecture to play an active role in pacifying the conflict.
Between 1876 and 1881, Umegatani started a period of dominance over Tokyo-sumo, winning 58 consecutive bouts, a streak only stopped once when he lost to fellow-ōzeki Wakashima. This streak is the fourth best record of consecutive victories behind Futabayama, Tanikaze and Hakuhō. Umegatani continued to win 35 consecutive bouts until the May 1884 tournament.

== Yokozuna ==
In February 1884, Umegaya received a yokozuna license from both the Yoshida (Tokyo-sumo) and Gojō (Osaka-sumo) families. Umegatani preferred the Yoshida license, which is said to have determined the outcome of the competition between the Yoshida and Gojō families' struggle for dominance in the sumo world.
After his promotion, he was given a set of three keshō-mawashi by Itō Hirobumi.
At the request of the Emperor Meiji, he was permitted to perform his ring-entering ceremony and fight in front of the emperor. The bout was against maegashira Ōdate, which ended in a draw after a heated battle that is said to have delighted the Emperor, and boosted sumo's popularity, which had declined after the Meiji Restoration.

== Retirement from sumo and death ==
Umegatani won 116 bouts and lost only 6 bouts in the top makuuchi division. He achieved a winning average of 95.1, the highest record among yokozuna, though could not surpass ōzeki Raiden. After his retirement, he served for a long time as a director in the Tokyo Sumo Association under the elder name of Ikazuchi. During his coaching career, he raised yokozuna Umegatani Tōtarō II, who later became his son-in-law.
He helped to raise funds for the building of the first Ryōgoku Kokugikan stadium in 1909. It is said that when asked by a potential backer what he had in the way of collateral, simply showing his muscles was enough to clinch the deal. When Umegatani II retired during the June 1915 tournament, Umegatani I transmitted his stable and his elder name to him. The Association however gave him the honorary title "Ōrai" (大雷, 'Great Thunderbolt') and treated him as an advisor. Umegatani lived until the age of eighty-three, making him the longest-lived yokozuna of all time. He outlived Umegatani Totaro II by nine months, and is one of very few yokozuna to have died of old age. He is buried in the Jisso-ji temple in Ōta, Tokyo.

== Top division record ==
- The actual time the tournaments were held during the year in this period often varied. The spring tournament recorded for 1878 was actually held in December of the previous year.

Umegatani
-	Spring	Winter
1874	x	West Maegashira #6; 8–0–1; 1d Unofficial
1875	West Maegashira #5; 6–1–3	Not held
1876	West Maegashira #4; 5–2–2; 1d	West Maegashira #2; 3–0–6; 1d
1877	West Maegashira #1; 8–0–2; Unofficial	West Komusubi; 7–0–2; 1d Unofficial
1878	West Sekiwake; 7–0–1; Unofficial	West Sekiwake; 4–0–4; 1d 1h
1879	West Ōzeki; 6–0–1; 3d	West Ōzeki; 5–0–4; 1h
1880	West Ōzeki; 0–0–6; 4d	West Ōzeki; 9–0–1; Unofficial
1881	West Ōzeki; 7–1–1; 1d Unofficial	West Ōzeki; 8–0–2; Unofficial
1882	Sat out	West Ōzeki; 5–0–4; 1d Unofficial
1883	East Ōzeki; 6–0–4	East Ōzeki; 3–0–7
1884	East Ōzeki; 7–0–2; 1d Unofficial	East Ōzeki; 7–2–1
1885	East Ōzeki; 3–0–4; 3d	East Ōzeki; Retired; 0–0–10
Record given as win-loss-absent Top Division Champion Retired Lower Divisions Key: d=Draw(s) (引分); h=Hold(s) (預り); nr=no result recorded Divisions: Makuuchi — Jūryō — Makushita — Sandanme — Jonidan — Jonokuchi Makuuchi ranks: Yokozuna (not ranked as such on banzuke until 1890); Ōzeki — Sekiwake — Komusubi — Maegashira

*Championships for the best record in a tournament were not recognized or awarded before the 1909 summer tournament and the above unofficial championships are historically conferred. For more information see yūshō.

== See also ==
- Glossary of sumo terms
- List of past sumo wrestlers
- List of yokozuna

Preceded by Sakaigawa Namiemon	15th Yokozuna; 1884–1885	Succeeded by Nishinoumi Kajirō I
Yokozuna is not a successive rank, and more than one wrestler can hold the title at once
