= Isegahama stable (1859–2007) =

Defunct sumo stable

Isegahama stable (1859–2007) was a sumo stable of the Tatsunami-Isegahama group. It was originally named Ajigawa stable.

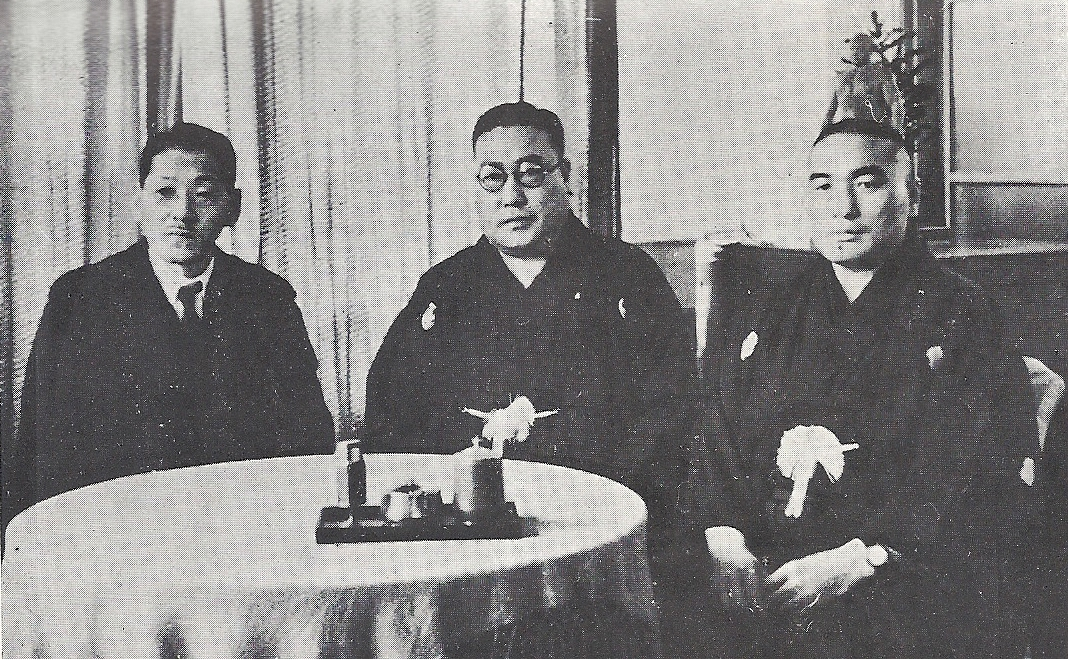
Meeting between Taniuchi Shōtarō (head of the Tokyo Detention House, left), Dewanoumi Hidemitsu (yokozuna Tsunenohana, center), and Isegahama Kandayu (sekiwake Kiyosegawa, right) of the Great Japan Sumo Association for the cooperation on a constitutional monument erection.

It was founded in 1859 by former komusubi Arakuma. It was led from 1929 by former sekiwake Kiyosegawa. His daughter married the sixth head, the 38th yokozuna Terukuni Manzō who led the stable from 1961 until his death in 1977. He had already made arrangements to pass control over to former ōzeki Kiyokuni Katsuo before his death. After Kiyokuni's wife and children were killed in the Japan Air Lines Flight 123 crash in 1985, the stable began to decline. He remarried and moved the stable's location, but his new wife was not as interested in helping to run the stable, and recruitment suffered. Its last top division wrestler Wakasegawa retired in 1992, and after jūryō division wrestler Kiyonofuji fell to makushita in January 1994, the stable had no more sekitori. By the end only two active wrestlers remained.

After Kiyokuni reached the mandatory retirement age of 65 in November 2006, it was led temporarily by the former Katsuhikari, who wound up the stable on February 1, 2007, moving to Kiriyama stable.

A different incarnation of Isegahama stable was founded as "Ajigawa stable" in 1979, before being renamed by yokozuna Asahifuji in November 2007. Asahifuji's decision to switch to the Isegahama name can be seen as an attempt to restore his ichimon's reputation (the ichimon was known as Tatsunami-Isegahama for many years before becoming solely Tatsunami; as a result of the success of the renamed stable the ichimon is now solely known as Isegahama).

== Notable wrestlers ==
- Kiyokuni Katsuo (ōzeki)
- Bishūyama Jun'ichi (sekiwake)
- Kairyūyama Teruhisa (sekiwake)
- Kurosegawa Kuniyuki (komusubi)
- Saisu Minoru (maegashira)
- Wakasegawa Yoshimitsu (maegashira)

== See also ==
- List of sumo stables
- List of sumo elders
- List of active sumo wrestlers
- List of past sumo wrestlers
- List of years in sumo
- Glossary of sumo terms
