= Hagurohana Toji =

Japanese sumo wrestler

Personal information
- Native name: 羽黒花 統司
- Born: Susumu Chiba; March 28, 1936 Nishiokoppe, Hokkaidō, Japan
- Died: June 3, 1984 (aged 48)
- Height: 1.81 m (5 ft 11 1/2 in)
- Weight: 125 kg (276 lb; 19.7 st)

Sport
- Sport: Sumo
- Retired: November, 1965
- Heya: Tatsunami
- Record: 347-255-86
- Debut: September, 1955
- Highest rank: Sekiwake (September, 1961)
- Elder name: Tamagaki
- Championships: 2 (Makushita); 1 (Sandanme); 1 (Jonidan)
- Special Prizes: Fighting Spirit (1)
- Gold Stars: 3 Asashio III; Wakanohana I Tochinoumi
- Updated on June 2020

Hagurohana Toji (born Susumu Chiba; March 28, 1936 - June 3, 1984) was a sumo wrestler from Nishiokoppe, Hokkaidō, Japan. He made his professional debut in September 1955, and reached the top division in September 1960. He was a prominent member of the top division during the Hakuho era, dominated by Taihō and Kashiwado. Upon retirement from active competition in 1965 at the early age of 29 he became an elder in the Japan Sumo Association under the name Onaruto and later Tamagaki. He left the Sumo Association in October 1972. He died of cancer in 1984 at the age of 48.

== Career ==
Upon graduating from high school he worked in agriculture but was advised to move to Tokyo by a relative of Annenyama (later Haguroyama) of the Tatsunami stable. He joined the stable in September 1955, making his debut at the age of 19. He originally fought under his own surname of Chiba. Due to his strong performance in his professional debut in shinjo he was allowed to skip the jonokuchi division and progress to jonidan. In July 1959 he won the makushita division championship or yūshō with a 7–1 record. Another championship in January 1960 with a perfect 8–0 record saw him promoted to the jūryō division. It took him three tournaments to progress through jūryō and he made his debut in the top makuuchi division in September 1960.

He scored 11–4 in just his second top division tournament in November 1960, and was awarded the Fighting Spirit prize. In May 1961 he finished runner-up to Sadanoyama with another 11–4 record. Following his runner-up performance he was promoted to komusubi and then straight to sekiwake. In November 1961 he was back in the maegashira ranks but defeated two yokozuna, Wakanohana and Asashio, to earn his first two kinboshi. In March 1964 he changed his shikona from Hagurohana to Hagurogawa and won his third kinboshi with a defeat of Tochinoumi. He returned to sekiwake in July 1964, but missed the November 1964 tournament with a dislocated right shoulder. In January 1965 he managed an 8–7 record but injured his right knee before the March 1965 tournament, forcing him to sit out two tournaments and fall to the bottom of the jūryō division. He was still not fully healed in July but entered the tournament in an attempt to prevent demotion to makushita. He aggravated the injury in a second day loss to Ogiyama, but after at first insisting he could fight on with one good leg, he decided to withdraw from the tournament the next day. Back in makushita for the first time since January 1960, he reverted to the name Hagurohana. He attempted rehabilitation of his knee but after breaking down three more times, he decided to retire in November 1965 without competing again. It was thought that Hagurohana could have made ōzeki if it had not been for his shoulder and knee injuries, but he was unable to regularly beat the top wrestlers when ranked in sanyaku, recording only one win against Taihō and none against Kashiwado. He was ranked in sanyaku 11 times from July 1961 to November 1964, and had an even top division record of 195 wins against 195 losses.

== Retirement from sumo ==
He remained the Japan Sumo Association as an elder, initially as Onaruto Oyakata and from 1968 as Tamagaki Oyakata, and worked as a coach at Tatsunami and as a judge of tournament bouts. However, he left the sumo world in 1972, later running a sumo themed restaurant in Narashino. He died of liver cancer in 1984 at the age of 48.

== Fighting style ==
Hagurohana was a yotsu-sumo wrestler, preferring fighting on the mawashi to slapping or pushing his opponents. His most common winning kimarite was yori-kiri (force out), but he was also well-known for tsuri-dashi (lift out), famously defeating yokozuna Wakanohana this way in November 1961.

== Career record ==
- The Kyushu tournament was first held in 1957, and the Nagoya tournament in 1958.

Hagurohana Toji
Year	January Hatsu basho, Tokyo	March Haru basho, Osaka	May Natsu basho, Tokyo	July Nagoya basho, Nagoya	September Aki basho, Tokyo	November Kyūshū basho, Fukuoka
1955	x	x	x	Not held	Shinjo; 3–0	Not held
1956	East Jonidan #85; 5–3	East Jonidan #50; 8–0; Champion	West Sandanme #86; 6–2	Not held	West Sandanme #51; 7–1–P; Champion	Not held
1957	East Sandanme #22; 4–4	West Sandanme #21; 5–3	East Sandanme #1; 7–1–P	Not held	East Makushita #58; 5–3	West Makushita #47; 6–2
1958	West Makushita #36; 6–2	West Makushita #26; 6–2	East Makushita #13; 4–4	West Makushita #12; 6–2	West Makushita #4; 0–1–7	West Makushita #19; Sat out due to injury 0–0–8
1959	West Makushita #40; 6–2	West Makushita #31; 6–2	East Makushita #21; 5–3	West Makushita #14; 7–1–P; Champion	West Makushita #7; 7–1	West Makushita #2; 6–2
1960	West Makushita #1; 8–0; Champion	West Jūryō #9; 9–6	East Jūryō #7; 9–6	East Jūryō #3; 11–4	West Maegashira #14; 9–6	East Maegashira #10; 11–4; F
1961	West Maegashira #3; 4–11	West Maegashira #6; 7–8	West Maegashira #6; 11–4	West Komusubi #1; 9–6	West Sekiwake #2; 6–9	East Maegashira #2; 5–10 ★★
1962	East Maegashira #8; 9–6	East Maegashira #4; 4–11	West Maegashira #7; 10–5	West Komusubi #1; 5–10	East Maegashira #4; 9–6	East Komusubi #1; 9–6
1963	East Komusubi #1; 10–5	East Sekiwake #1; 6–9	West Maegashira #2; 5–10	West Maegashira #6; 8–7	East Maegashira #4; 9–6	West Komusubi #1; 8–7
1964	West Sekiwake #1; 2–13	West Maegashira #5; 6–9 ★	East Maegashira #6; 10–5	East Sekiwake #1; 8–7	West Sekiwake #1; 7–8	East Komusubi #1; Sat out due to injury 0–0–15
1965	Maegashira #9; 8–7	West Maegashira #6; Sat out due to injury 0–0–15	West Jūryō #1; Sat out due to injury 0–0–15	West Jūryō #16; 0–3–12	West Makushita #14; Sat out due to injury 0–0–7	West Makushita #51; Retired; 0–0–7
Record given as wins–losses–absences Top division champion Top division runner-up Retired Lower divisions Non-participation Sanshō key: F=Fighting spirit; O=Outstanding performance; T=Technique Also shown: ★=Kinboshi; P=Playoff(s); Divisions: Makuuchi — Jūryō — Makushita — Sandanme — Jonidan — Jonokuchi Makuuchi ranks: Yokozuna — Ōzeki — Sekiwake — Komusubi — Maegashira

== See also ==
- Glossary of sumo terms
- List of past sumo wrestlers
- List of sekiwake
- List of sumo tournament top division runners-up
