= Kainoyama Isamu =

Sumo wrestler

Personal information
- Native name: 海乃山 勇
- Born: Isamu Irii; June 28, 1940 Ryūgasaki, Ibaraki, Japan
- Died: July 5, 1997 (aged 57)
- Height: 1.72 m (5 ft 7 1/2 in)
- Weight: 120 kg (260 lb; 19 st)

Sport
- Sport: Sumo
- Retired: January, 1970
- Heya: Onogawa → Dewanoumi
- Record: 550-496-13
- Debut: May, 1955
- Highest rank: Sekiwake (May, 1963)
- Elder name: Onogawa
- Championships: 1 (Makushita); 1 (Sandanme)
- Special Prizes: Outstanding Performance (1); Fighting Spirit (2); Technique (3)
- Gold Stars: 5 Taihō (3); Tochinoumi; Kashiwado
- Updated on June 2020

Kainoyama Isamu (born Isamu Irii; June 28, 1940 – July 5, 1997) was a sumo wrestler from Ryūgasaki, Ibaraki, Japan. He made his professional debut in May 1955, and reached the top division in January 1961. His highest rank was sekiwake. Upon retirement from active competition he became an elder in the Japan Sumo Association under the name Onogawa. He left the Sumo Association in September 1971.

== Career record ==
- The Kyushu tournament was first held in 1957, and the Nagoya tournament in 1958.

Kainoyama Isamu
Year	January Hatsu basho, Tokyo	March Haru basho, Osaka	May Natsu basho, Tokyo	July Nagoya basho, Nagoya	September Aki basho, Tokyo	November Kyūshū basho, Fukuoka
1956	x	x	(Maezumo)	Not held	West Jonokuchi #10; 5–3	Not held
1957	East Jonidan #83; 6–2	West Jonidan #43; 6–2	West Sandanme #108; 6–2	Not held	West Sandanme #54; 3–5	East Sandanme #59; 7–1
1958	West Sandanme #28; 7–1–P; Champion	East Makushita #80; 5–3	West Makushita #73; 6–2	East Makushita #55; 5–3	West Makushita #47; 5–3	West Makushita #39; 8–0; Champion
1959	West Makushita #7; 5–3	West Makushita #5; 7–1–P	East Makushita #2; 6–2	West Jūryō #19; 7–8	East Makushita #2; 5–3	East Makushita #1; 5–3
1960	East Makushita #2; 6–2	West Jūryō #15; 9–6	West Jūryō #10; 9–6	East Jūryō #6; 10–5	West Jūryō #3; 10–5	East Jūryō #1; 8–7
1961	East Maegashira #15; 8–7	West Maegashira #13; 7–8	East Maegashira #14; 6–9	West Jūryō #2; 10–5	West Maegashira #13; 11–4	East Maegashira #3; 8–7
1962	East Maegashira #2; 4–11	West Maegashira #8; 6–9	West Maegashira #8; 9–6	West Maegashira #4; 1–5–9	East Maegashira #14; 8–7	East Maegashira #12; 9–6
1963	East Maegashira #8; 12–3; T	West Maegashira #1; 10–5; F	West Sekiwake #1; 4–11	West Maegashira #2; 6–9	West Maegashira #3; 6–9	West Maegashira #6; 12–3; T
1964	East Komusubi #1; 4–11	West Maegashira #4; 4–11	East Maegashira #7; 8–7	West Maegashira #3; 4–11 ★	West Maegashira #7; 8–7	West Maegashira #5; 7–8
1965	West Maegashira #5; 8–7	East Maegashira #2; 7–8 ★	West Maegashira #3; 9–6 ★	East Maegashira #1; 5–10	East Maegashira #6; 10–5	East Maegashira #2; 3–12
1966	West Maegashira #11; 12–3; T	East Maegashira #4; 5–10 ★	West Maegashira #6; 10–5	East Maegashira #2; 7–8	West Maegashira #2; 9–6	East Komusubi #1; 6–9
1967	West Maegashira #2; 4–11	East Maegashira #9; 8–7	East Maegashira #6; 11–4	East Maegashira #1; 5–10	East Maegashira #6; 11–4; F	West Sekiwake #1; 8–7; O
1968	East Sekiwake #1; 6–9	East Maegashira #1; 8–7	East Maegashira #1; 9–6	West Komusubi #1; 6–9	West Maegashira #1; 7–8	East Maegashira #3; 6–9
1969	West Maegashira #4; 8–7	East Maegashira #2; 5–10	East Maegashira #6; 8–7	East Maegashira #2; 4–11 ★	East Maegashira #7; 8–7	East Maegashira #3; 3–12
1970	East Maegashira #12; Retired; 6–5–4					
Record given as wins–losses–absences Top division champion Top division runner-up Retired Lower divisions Non-participation Sanshō key: F=Fighting spirit; O=Outstanding performance; T=Technique Also shown: ★=Kinboshi; P=Playoff(s); Divisions: Makuuchi — Jūryō — Makushita — Sandanme — Jonidan — Jonokuchi Makuuchi ranks: Yokozuna — Ōzeki — Sekiwake — Komusubi — Maegashira

== See also ==
- Glossary of sumo terms
- List of past sumo wrestlers
- List of sumo tournament top division runners-up
- List of sumo tournament second division champions
- List of sekiwake
