= Iwakaze Kakutaro =

Japanese sumo wrestler (1934–1988)

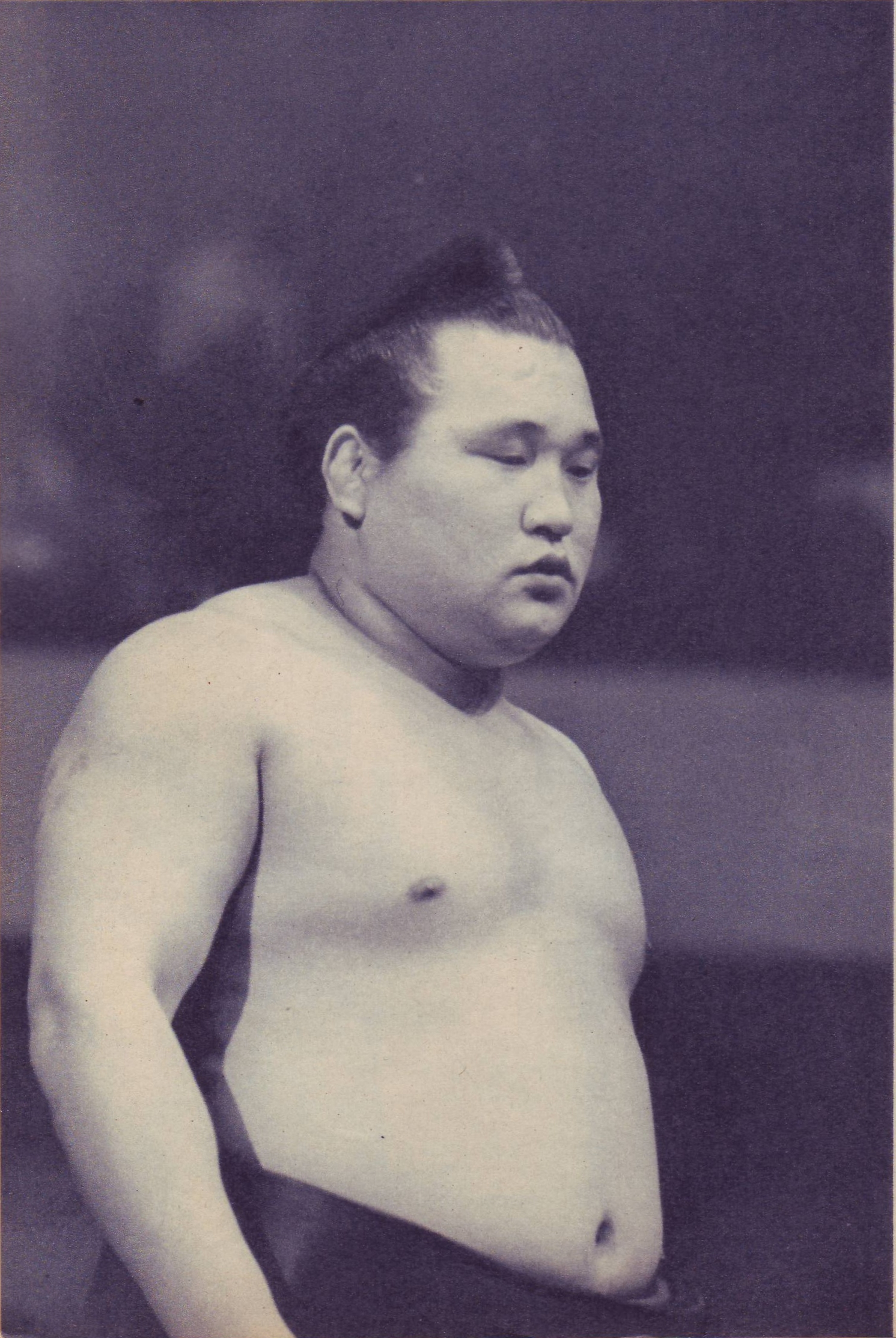

Personal information
- Native name: 岩風 角太郎
- Born: Yoshikazu Okamoto; January 22, 1934 Edogawa-ku, Tokyo, Japan
- Died: April 30, 1988 (aged 54)
- Height: 1.74 m (5 ft 8 1/2 in)
- Weight: 117 kg (258 lb; 18.4 st)

Sport
- Sport: Sumo
- Retired: September, 1965
- Heya: Wakamatsu → Nishiiwa → Wakamatsu
- Record: 483-478-0
- Debut: May, 1952
- Highest rank: Sekiwake (January, 1961)
- Championships: 1 (Jūryō)
- Special Prizes: Outstanding Performance (3); Fighting Spirit (1)
- Gold Stars: 6 Wakanohana I (2); Tochinoumi (2); Yoshibayama; Chiyonoyama
- Updated on Sep. 2012

Iwakaze Kakutaro (born Yoshikazu Okamoto; January 22, 1934 – April 30, 1988) was a sumo wrestler from Edogawa, Tokyo, Japan. He made his professional debut in May 1952 and reached the top division in May 1956. His highest rank was sekiwake. He retired from active competition in September 1965.

== Pre-modern career record ==
- In 1953 the New Year tournament was begun and the Spring tournament began to be held in Osaka.

Iwakaze Kakutaro
-	Spring Haru basho, Tokyo	Summer Natsu basho, Tokyo	Autumn Aki basho, Tokyo
1952	x	Shinjo; 3–0	West Jonidan #17; 5–3
Record given as wins–losses–absences Top division champion Top division runner-up Retired Lower divisions Non-participation Sanshō key: F=Fighting spirit; O=Outstanding performance; T=Technique Also shown: ★=Kinboshi; P=Playoff(s); Divisions: Makuuchi — Jūryō — Makushita — Sandanme — Jonidan — Jonokuchi Makuuchi ranks: Yokozuna — Ōzeki — Sekiwake — Komusubi — Maegashira

-	New Year Hatsu basho, Tokyo	Spring Haru basho, Osaka	Summer Natsu basho, Tokyo	Autumn Aki basho, Tokyo
1953	West Sandanme #53; 6–2	West Sandanme #32; 7–1	West Sandanme #12; 4–4	West Sandanme #8; 4–4
1954	West Sandanme #5; 7–1	East Makushita #30; 4–4	West Makushita #28; 5–3	West Makushita #21; 6–2
1955	West Makushita #9; 6–2	East Makushita #2; 5–3	East Jūryō #19; 9–6	West Jūryō #12; 8–7
1956	West Jūryō #8; 11–4–P; Champion	West Jūryō #2; 11–4	West Maegashira #16; 9–6	East Maegashira #14; 9–6
Record given as wins–losses–absences Top division champion Top division runner-up Retired Lower divisions Non-participation Sanshō key: F=Fighting spirit; O=Outstanding performance; T=Technique Also shown: ★=Kinboshi; P=Playoff(s); Divisions: Makuuchi — Jūryō — Makushita — Sandanme — Jonidan — Jonokuchi Makuuchi ranks: Yokozuna — Ōzeki — Sekiwake — Komusubi — Maegashira

== Modern career record ==
- Since the addition of the Kyushu tournament in 1957 and the Nagoya tournament in 1958, the yearly schedule has remained unchanged.

Year	January Hatsu basho, Tokyo	March Haru basho, Osaka	May Natsu basho, Tokyo	July Nagoya basho, Nagoya	September Aki basho, Tokyo	November Kyūshū basho, Fukuoka
1957	East Maegashira #10; 5–10	East Maegashira #14; 11–4	East Maegashira #5; 4–11	Not held	West Maegashira #13; 8–7	West Maegashira #11; 10–5
1958	West Maegashira #2; 4–11 ★★	West Maegashira #7; 4–11	East Maegashira #12; 10–5	East Maegashira #6; 6–9	West Maegashira #10; 9–6	West Maegashira #7; 6–9
1959	West Maegashira #10; 8–7	West Maegashira #8; 7–8	West Maegashira #10; 10–5	West Maegashira #4; 9–6; O★	West Maegashira #1; 5–10	East Maegashira #6; 8–7
1960	East Maegashira #4; 9–6 ★	West Maegashira #2; 7–8	East Maegashira #4; 6–9	West Maegashira #7; 12–3; F	West Komusubi #2; 8–7	West Komusubi #1; 10–5
1961	West Sekiwake #1; 8–7	West Sekiwake #1; 8–7	West Sekiwake #1; 8–7	East Sekiwake #1; 7–8	West Komusubi #1; 8–7	West Komusubi #1; 9–6
1962	East Komusubi #1; 1–14	East Maegashira #10; 7–8	East Maegashira #8; 6–9	East Maegashira #11; 8–7	East Maegashira #8; 11–4	East Maegashira #1; 4–11
1963	East Maegashira #7; 6–9	West Maegashira #8; 8–7	West Maegashira #5; 12–3; O	West Komusubi #1; 4–11	East Maegashira #3; 9–6; O	West Sekiwake #1; 5–10
1964	West Maegashira #2; 5–10	East Maegashira #6; 4–11 ★	East Maegashira #10; 10–5	East Maegashira #3; 7–8	West Maegashira #3; 5–10 ★	East Maegashira #6; 5–10
1965	West Maegashira #10; 7–8	West Maegashira #11; 6–9	East Maegashira #13; 2–13	East Jūryō #3; 5–10	West Jūryō #8; Retired; 3–12	x
Record given as wins–losses–absences Top division champion Top division runner-up Retired Lower divisions Non-participation Sanshō key: F=Fighting spirit; O=Outstanding performance; T=Technique Also shown: ★=Kinboshi; P=Playoff(s); Divisions: Makuuchi — Jūryō — Makushita — Sandanme — Jonidan — Jonokuchi Makuuchi ranks: Yokozuna — Ōzeki — Sekiwake — Komusubi — Maegashira

== See also ==
- Glossary of sumo terms
- List of past sumo wrestlers
- List of sumo tournament top division runners-up
- List of sumo tournament second division champions
- List of sekiwake
