= Wakamiyama Kōhei =

Japanese sumo wrestler

Personal information
- Native name: 若見山 幸平
- Born: Toshihiko Kumano; 16 April 1943 (age 83) Toyama, Japan
- Height: 1.76 m (5 ft 9 1/2 in)
- Weight: 176 kg (388 lb)

Sport
- Sport: Sumo
- Retired: November, 1969
- Heya: Tatsunami
- Record: 424-406-12
- Debut: November, 1957
- Highest rank: Sekiwake (November, 1965)
- Elder name: Ōnaruto
- Championships: 1 (Jūryō)
- Special Prizes: Fighting Spirit (1)
- Gold Stars: 1 (Sadanoyama)
- Updated on June 2020

Wakamiyama Kōhei (born 16 April 1943 as Toshihiko Kumano) is a former sumo wrestler from Toyama City, Japan. He made his professional debut in November 1957, and reached the top division in January 1964. His highest rank was sekiwake. He retired in November 1969.

== Career record ==
- The Nagoya tournament was first held in 1958.

Wakamiyama Kōhei
Year	January Hatsu basho, Tokyo	March Haru basho, Osaka	May Natsu basho, Tokyo	July Nagoya basho, Nagoya	September Aki basho, Tokyo	November Kyūshū basho, Fukuoka
1957	x	x	x	Not held	x	Shinjo; 1–2
1958	West Jonidan #126; 6–2	East Jonidan #93; 1–7	West Jonidan #104; 5–3	West Jonidan #74; 6–2	West Jonidan #41; 5–3	West Jonidan #21; 4–4
1959	West Jonidan #19; 7–1	West Sandanme #77; 6–2	West Sandanme #55; 2–6	West Sandanme #65; 3–5	West Sandanme #72; 4–4	East Sandanme #66; 5–3
1960	East Sandanme #49; 5–3	East Sandanme #34; 5–3	East Sandanme #12; 5–3	East Makushita #82; 1–6	West Sandanme #16; 5–2	East Makushita #82; 6–1
1961	East Makushita #62; 3–4	East Makushita #71; 5–2	East Makushita #52; 1–6	East Makushita #69; 4–3	West Makushita #62; 5–2	East Makushita #44; 5–2
1962	East Makushita #28; 3–4	West Makushita #30; 3–4	West Makushita #31; 4–3	East Makushita #26; 3–4	East Makushita #28; 6–1	West Makushita #16; 6–1
1963	East Makushita #5; 5–2	West Makushita #2; 6–1	West Jūryō #14; 10–5	West Jūryō #11; 9–6	East Jūryō #6; 10–5	West Jūryō #2; 11–4
1964	East Maegashira #14; 10–5	East Maegashira #2; 8–7; F	West Komusubi #1; 4–11	West Maegashira #5; 11–4	West Komusubi #1; 5–10	West Maegashira #3; 8–7
1965	East Maegashira #2; 2–7–6	West Maegashira #10; 6–9	West Maegashira #12; 10–5	West Maegashira #6; 11–4	West Komusubi #1; 8–7	West Sekiwake #1; 9–6
1966	West Sekiwake #1; 6–9	West Maegashira #1; 4–11 ★	West Maegashira #4; 7–8	East Maegashira #5; 9–6	East Maegashira #1; 2–7–6	West Maegashira #7; 8–7
1967	West Maegashira #3; 3–12	West Maegashira #12; 10–5	East Maegashira #5; 5–10	East Maegashira #9; 8–7	West Maegashira #8; 8–7	East Maegashira #5; 4–11
1968	East Maegashira #12; 2–13	West Jūryō #5; 9–6	West Jūryō #1; 8–7	West Jūryō #1; 14–1; Champion	West Maegashira #6; 3–12	East Jūryō #1; 9–6
1969	East Maegashira #12; 2–13	West Jūryō #9; 8–7	West Jūryō #6; 7–8	West Jūryō #7; 5–10	East Jūryō #12; 9–6	East Jūryō #9; Retired; 1–14
Record given as wins–losses–absences Top division champion Top division runner-up Retired Lower divisions Non-participation Sanshō key: F=Fighting spirit; O=Outstanding performance; T=Technique Also shown: ★=Kinboshi; P=Playoff(s); Divisions: Makuuchi — Jūryō — Makushita — Sandanme — Jonidan — Jonokuchi Makuuchi ranks: Yokozuna — Ōzeki — Sekiwake — Komusubi — Maegashira

== See also ==
- Glossary of sumo terms
- List of past sumo wrestlers
- List of sumo tournament second division champions
- List of sekiwake
