= List of sekiwake =

This is a list of all sumo wrestlers whose pinnacle in the sport has been the third highest rank of sekiwake and who held the rank in the modern era of sumo since the 1927 merger of the Tokyo and Osaka organizations. Wrestlers who went on to be promoted to ōzeki and yokozuna can be seen in the List of ōzeki and List of yokozuna.

While it is required and most common for each rankings chart (banzuke) to list exactly two wrestlers at this rank, instances of three or even four active sekiwake have occurred on rare occasions.

The number of tournaments (basho) at sekiwake is also listed. Wrestlers who won a top division championship (yūshō) are indicated in bold. Active wrestlers are indicated by italics.

The table is up to date as of the start of the November 2026 tournament.

== List ==
Name	Basho at rank	Born	From	Promoted	End of rank
Kiyosegawa Keinosuke	5	1893	Hiraka, Akita	1921	1928*
Wakabayama Atsumi	8	1895	Chiba, Chiba	1922	1927*
Dewagatake Bunjiro	2	1902	Kaminoyama	1926	1928*
**Yamanishiki Zenjiro**	2	1898	Osaka	1927	1928*
Nishikinada Yosaburo	7	1900	Aira, Kagoshima	1928	1930*
Tenryū Saburō	6	1903	Hamamatsu	1930	1932
Hatasegawa Kunishichiro	5	1905	Yuzawa, Akita	1932	1934*
Okitsuumi Fukuo	4	1910	Munakata, Fukuoka	1932	1933
Takanobori Hirochika	4	1908	Shimoina, Nagano	1933	1935*
**Ayagawa Goroji II**	1	1898	Nishitsugaru, Aomori	1935	1935
Shinkai Kozo	2	1904	Akita, Akita	1935	1935
Oshio Seijiro	1	1900	Okawa, Fukuoka	1936	1936
Kasagiyama Katsuichi	2	1911	Yamatokoriyama	1937	1942*
**Dewaminato Rikichi**	3	1907	Shibata, Niigata	1937	1943*
Asahigawa Kokichi	1	1905	Asahikawa	1937	1937
Taikyuzan Takayoshi	2	1908	Tamano	1937	1938
Ryogoku Kajinosuke III	1	1907	Nagasaki	1938	1938
Tamanoumi Umekichi	3	1912	Omura, Nagasaki	1938	1942*
Banjaku Kumataro	1	1908	Osaka	1938	1938
Ayanobori Takezo	1	1908	Sendai	1939	1939
Hishuzan Sakae	3	1906	Sasebo, Nagasaki	1941	1942
Toyoshima Masao	1	1919	Osaka	1943	1943
Sagamigawa Yoshinobu	3	1917	Atsugi, Kanagawa	1943	1944
Futasegawa Masaichi	1	1916	Kitakatsuragi, Nara	1944	1944
Terunobori Katsuhiko	2	1922	Rumoi	1944	1948*
Kamikaze Shoichi	4	1921	Higashikagawa, Kagawa	1944	1949*
**Bishūyama Jun'ichi**	1	1919	Fukuyama, Hiroshima	1945	1945
Fudoiwa Mitsuo	1	1924	Kumamoto	1946	1946
Kozuzan Yoshinobu	1	1919	Takaichi, Nara	1947	1947
Rikidōzan Mitsuhiro	3	1924	Omura, Nagasaki	1949	1950*
**Tokitsuyama Jin'ichi**	10	1925	Iwaki, Fukushima	1954	1959*
Hajimayama Masanobu	1	1922	Hashima, Gifu	1956	1956
Dewanishiki Tadao	3	1925	Sumida, Tokyo	1956	1962*
Tsurugamine Akio	2	1929	Kajiki, Kagoshima	1956	1962*
**Tamanoumi Daitaro**	5	1923	Oita, Oita	1957	1959*
Haguroyama Sojō	14	1934	Shimokawa, Hokkaido	1957	1962*
Kitanonada Noboru	2	1923	Abashiri, Hokkaido	1957	1960*
Wakamaeda Eiichirō	3	1930	Nishibiwajima, Aichi	1958	1959*
Shinobuyama Harusada	3	1925	Date, Fukushima	1958	1958
Fusanishiki Katsuhiko	3	1936	Ichikawa, Chiba	1959	1961*
**Daigō Hisateru**	10	1937	Marugame, Kagawa	1960	1965*
Iwakaze Kakutaro	5	1934	Edogawa, Tokyo	1961	1963*
Maedagawa Katsu	2	1939	Esashi, Iwate	1961	1962*
Hagurohana Toji	5	1936	Nishiokoppe, Hokkaido	1961	1964*
Oginohana Masaaki	3	1935	Mikatsuki, Saga	1962	1963
Kainoyama Isamu	3	1940	Ryugasaki, Ibaraki	1963	1968*
Aonosato Sakari	1	1935	Kuraishi, Aomori	1963	1963
Wakachichibu Komei	2	1939	Chichibu, Saitama	1963	1963
Kairyūyama Teruhisa	2	1939	Showa, Akita	1964	1964*
Myobudani Yasuhiko	5	1937	Akan, Hokkaido	1964	1967*
Wakamiyama Kōhei	2	1943	Toyama, Toyama	1965	1966
Kōtetsuyama Toyoya	1	1942	Otaru, Hokkaido	1967	1967
Fujinokawa Takeo	2	1946	Otofuke, Hokkaido	1967	1970*
**Hasegawa Katsuhiro**	21	1944	Kurisawa, Hokkaido	1969	1974*
**Tochiazuma Tomoyori**	1	1944	Soma, Fukushima	1970	1970
Fukunohana Koichi	1	1940	Koshi, Kumamoto	1971	1971
Mutsuarashi Yukio	1	1943	Tohoku, Aomori	1971	1971
**Takamiyama Daigorō**	8	1944	Maui, Hawaii	1972	1977*
Fujizakura Yoshimori	2	1948	Kofu, Yamanashi	1974	1978*
Kurohimeyama Hideo	8	1948	Oumi, Niigata	1974	1979*
Kirinji Kazuharu	7	1953	Kashiwa, Chiba	1975	1979*
**Kongō Masahiro**	1	1948	Fukagawa, Hokkaido	1975	1975
Washūyama Yoshikazu	3	1949	Kurashiki, Okayama	1976	1977*
Arase Nagahide	9	1949	Ino, Kōchi	1976	1980*
Kitaseumi Hiromitsu	2	1948	Setana, Hokkaido	1976	1977*
Kaneshiro Kofuku	1	1953	Takanabe, Miyazaki	1977	1977
Tamanofuji Shigeru	6	1949	Ogawa, Tochigi	1978	1979*
Kurama Tatsuya	1	1952	Yasu, Shiga	1978	1978
Tochiakagi Takanori	6	1954	Numata, Gunma	1979	1980*
Kaiki Nobuhide	1	1952	Tenmabayashi, Aomori	1979	1979
Ōzutsu Takeshi	3	1956	Yokkaichi, Mie	1981	1983*
Daijuyama Tadaaki	3	1959	Niitsu, Niigata	1981	1989*
Dewanohana Yoshitaka	7	1951	Nakasato, Aomori	1982	1983*
Aobajō Yukio	1	1948	Sendai, Miyagi	1983	1983
Masudayama Yasuhito	1	1951	Nanao, Ishikawa	1983	1983
**Tagaryū Shōji**	1	1958	Hitachi, Ibaraki	1983	1983
Kōbōyama Daizō	1	1957	Tsukidate, Fukushima	1984	1984
Tōryū Kenji	1	1958	Kakogawa, Hyogo	1984	1984
Hōō Tomomichi	1	1956	Gamagori, Aichi	1984	1984
Sakahoko Nobushige	12	1961	Kajiki, Kagoshima	1984	1989*
Kotogaume Tsuyoshi	12	1963	Yatsuo, Toyama	1986	1990*
**Mitoizumi Masayuki**	4	1962	Mito, Ibaraki	1986	1992*
Masurao Hiroo	1	1961	Itoda, Fukuoka	1987	1987
Tochinowaka Kiyotaka	7	1962	Shimotsu, Wakayama	1987	1992*
Tochitsukasa Tetsuo	1	1958	Nagoya, Aichi	1988	1988
Terao Tsunefumi	7	1963	Kajiki, Kagoshima	1989	1990*
Akinoshima Katsumi	12	1967	Toyota, Hiroshima	1989	1999*
**Kotofuji Takaya**	1	1964	Shibata, Niigata	1990	1990
**Kotonishiki Katsuhiro**	21	1968	Misato, Gunma	1990	1997*
**Takatōriki Tadashige**	15	1967	Kobe, Hyogo	1991	1998*
Wakashoyo Shunichi	1	1966	Nakano, Tokyo	1993	1993
Tosanoumi Toshio	7	1972	Aki, Kōchi	1997	2005*
Tamakasuga Ryōji	1	1972	Nomura, Ehime	1997	1997
Kotonowaka Terumasa	2	1968	Obanazawa, Yamagata	1999	1999
Hayateumi Hidehito	1	1975	Itayanagi, Aomori	2000	2000
Wakanosato Shinobu	17	1976	Hirosaki, Aomori	2001	2005*
Tochinonada Taiichi	2	1974	Nanao, Ishikawa	2001	2001
Takanowaka Yūki	2	1976	Ikitsuki, Nagasaki	2003	2003
**Kyokutenhō Masaru**	3	1974	Nalaikh, Mongolia	2003	2004*
Tamanoshima Arata	1	1977	Izumizaki, Fukushima	2004	2004
Hokutōriki Hideki	1	1977	Otawara, Tochigi	2004	2004
Asasekiryū Tarō	2	1981	Ulaanbaatar Mongolia	2007	2007
Aminishiki Ryūji	6	1978	Fukaura, Aomori	2007	2012*
Toyonoshima Daiki	5	1983	Sukumo, Kōchi	2008	2016*
Aran Hakutora	1	1984	Vladikavkaz, Russia	2013	2013
Tochiōzan Yūichirō	11	1987	Aki, Kōchi	2010	2016*
Myōgiryū Yasunari	8	1986	Takasago, Hyogo	2012	2015*
Takekaze Akira	1	1979	Kitaakita, Akita	2014	2014
Aoiyama Kōsuke	2	1986	Sofia, Bulgaria	2014	2014
**Ichinojō Takashi**	8	1993	Arkhangai, Mongolia	2014	2019*
Okinoumi Ayumi	2	1985	Okinoshima, Shimane	2015	2016*
Yoshikaze Masatsugu	4	1982	Saiki, Oita	2016	2017*
Kotoyūki Kazuyoshi	1	1991	Shōdoshima, Kagawa	2016	2016
Ikioi Shōta	1	1986	Katano, Osaka	2016	2016
Kaisei Ichirō	1	1986	São Paulo, Brazil	2016	2016
Takarafuji Daisuke	1	1987	Nakadomari, Aomori	2016	2016
**Tamawashi Ichirō**	8	1984	Ulaanbaatar, Mongolia	2017	2019*
**Daieishō Hayato**	14	1993	Asaka, Saitama	2020	2025*
Takanoshō Nobuaki	5	1994	Kashiwa, Chiba	2020	2022*
Meisei Chikara	2	1994	Setouchi, Kagoshima	2021	2022
**Wakatakakage Atsushi**	10	1994	Fukushima, Fukushima	2022	2026*
**Abi Masatora**	5	1994	Koshigaya, Saitama	2022	2024*
Wakamotoharu Minato	7	1993	Fukushima, Fukushima	2023	2025*
Ōhō Kōnosuke	2	2000	Kōtō, Tokyo	2025	2025*
Atamifuji Sakutarō	4	2002	Atami, Shizuoka	2026	active
**Kotoshōhō Yoshinari**	2	1999	Kashiwa, Chiba	2026	2026
Fujinokawa Seigō	2	2002	Edogawa, Tokyo	2026	active

* Wrestler held the rank on at least two separate occasions.

== Trivia ==
The longest-serving sekiwake of modern times, who could not secure further promotion, have been Hasegawa and Kotonishiki who each held the rank for 21 tournaments, with the former failing despite achieving a consecutive jun-yusho and yusho at the rank. (Kotomitsuki was ranked at sekiwake for 22 tournaments but ultimately promoted to ōzeki.)

Having held a rank of komusubi or sekiwake for at least one tournament will qualify a wrestler to later become a sumo elder (toshiyori), while the many that fail to do so are subject to much stricter criteria.

== See also ==
- Glossary of sumo terms
- List of active sumo wrestlers
- List of past sumo wrestlers
- List of sumo top division champions
- List of sumo top division runners-up
- List of yokozuna
- List of ōzeki
- List of komusubi
- Makuuchi
