= Kitanonada Noboru =

Japanese sumo wrestler (1923–2002)

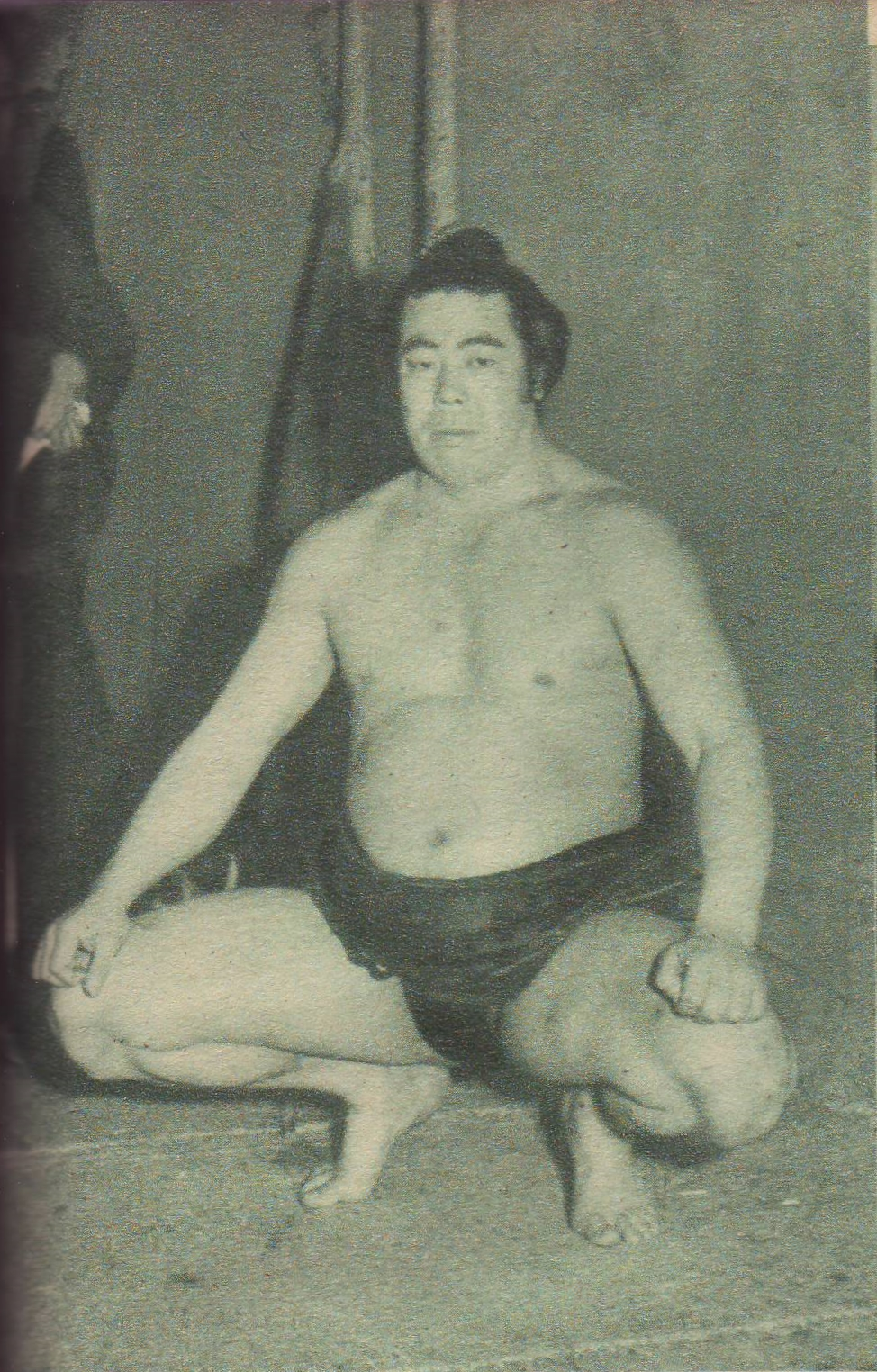

Personal information
- Native name: 北の洋 昇
- Born: Noboru Ogata; February 1, 1923 Abashiri, Hokkaido
- Died: January 8, 2002 (aged 78)
- Height: 180 cm (5 ft 11 in)
- Weight: 120 kg (265 lb; 18 st 13 lb)

Sport
- Sport: Sumo
- Retired: March 1962
- Heya: Tatsunami
- Record: 494-473-29
- Debut: January 1940
- Highest rank: Sekiwake
- Elder name: Takekuma
- Special Prizes: 5 (Technique); 4 (Outstanding Performance); 1 (Fighting Spirit)
- Gold Stars: 10 (3) Asashio (2) Tochinishiki (2) Yoshibayama (1) Azumafuji (1) Chiyonoyama (1) Wakanohana I
- Updated on June 2020

Kitanonada Noboru (February 1, 1923 – January 8, 2002), born Noboru Ogata, was a sumo wrestler from Abashiri, Hokkaido, Japan. His highest rank was sekiwake. He was ranked in the top makuuchi division from 1950 until 1962 and earned ten gold stars for defeating yokozuna. After his retirement from active competition he was an elder of the Japan Sumo Association and worked as a coach at Tatsunami stable until his mandatory retirement in 1988 upon reaching 65 years of age. He then became a sumo TV commentator.

== Career ==
He was born in 1923 as Noboru Ogata in Abashiri, Hokkaido, the second son of owners of a popular local restaurant. His older brother died in an accident at elementary school, and he became a much shyer personality after that tragedy. An acquaintance had connections to sekiwake Asahigawa, and Ogata was also an admirer of Futabayama. Both were members of the Tatsunami stable, and so in January 1939 Ogata applied to join. He was turned down due to a lack of weight, with the coach who conducted the examination suggesting he might be better off as a tokoyama (sumo hairdresser). However, Ogata was determined to become a sumo wrestler, and successfully passed the physical examination a year later. Making his professional debut in January 1940, and managing to avoid being called up for war service, he rose slowly up the ranks. He reached the second highest juryo division in October 1948 and the top makuuchi division in September 1950. He made his debut in the sanyaku ranks at komusubi in September 1954. He was runner-up in the March 1957 tournament with a 12–3 record. His highest rank was sekiwake, which he reached in November 1957 at the age of 35. He earned ten special prizes for achievements in tournaments and ten kinboshi, or gold stars, for defeating yokozuna. His kinboshi were earned against six different yokozuna: Azumafuji, Yoshibayama (twice), Tochinishiki (twice), Chiyonoyama, Wakanohana and Asashio (three times). He defeated Tochinishiki on the opening day of the September 1958 tournament, a match which became notorious after the referee initially awarded the bout to Tochinishiki and then argued with the judges for ten minutes after they reversed his decision, leading to the referee's suspension for the rest of the tournament. His final win over a yokozuna was in May 1961 at the age of 38 years, three months, making him the oldest post-war wrestler ever to earn a kinboshi.

== Fighting style ==
He was known as "white lightning" because of his powerful tachi-ai and the speed and ferocity of his bouts. His most common winning kimarite, or techniques, were yori-kiri (force out), yori-taoshi (force out and down), and uwate-nage (overarm throw).

== Retirement from sumo ==
He retired in March 1962, after facing demotion to the juryo division. At 39 years and one month he was one of the oldest ever postwar sekitori. He had fought in 77 career tournaments, 52 in the top division, where his winning percentage was .487 (368 wins against 388 losses). He became an elder of the Japan Sumo Association under the name Takekuma. He worked as a coach at his old stable and was also on the board of Directors of the Sumo Association from 1978 to 1982. When yokozuna Futahaguro had a heated row with his stablemaster, ex-sekiwake Annenyama, in December 1987, storming out of the stable and pushing his stablemaster's wife out of the way, it was Takekuma who tried unsuccessfully to persuade Futahaguro to return and apologize. Futahaguro was forced to retire in disgrace. Takekuma retired from the Sumo Association himself shortly afterwards at the end of January 1988, having reached the mandatory retirement age of 65. He passed on the Takekuma elder name to former sekiwake Kurohimeyama, who had become his son-in-law.

Upon leaving the Sumo Association he became a TV commentator for NHK's sumo coverage. His last appearance was in 2000, and he suffered a stroke in March 2001. He died in 2002 at the age of 78 in a hospital in Tochigi, from cerebral thrombosis.

== Career record ==
Kitanonada Noboru
-	Spring Haru basho, Tokyo	Summer Natsu basho, Tokyo	Autumn Aki basho, Tokyo
1940	(Maezumo)	West Shinjo; 1–2	Not held
1941	West Jonokuchi #12; 6–2	East Jonidan #33; 4–4	Not held
1942	East Jonidan #30; 7–1	East Sandanme #21; 4–4	Not held
1943	East Sandanme #14; 6–2	East Makushita #40; 5–3	Not held
1944	West Makushita #26; 5–3	East Makushita #9; 0–0–5	West Makushita #25; 3–2
1945	Not held	East Makushita #11; 2–3	East Makushita #13; 3–2
1946	Not held	Not held	West Makushita #8; 4–3
1947	Not held	East Makushita #4; 1–4	West Makushita #12; 4–2
1948	Not held	East Makushita #4; 4–2	East Jūryō #14; 3–8
1949	East Makushita #4; 9–3	East Jūryō #10; 8–7	East Jūryō #8; 7–8
1950	West Jūryō #9; 11–4	East Jūryō #1; 9–6	West Maegashira #18; 7–8
1951	East Maegashira #19; 6–9	East Jūryō #1; 10–5	East Maegashira #17; 5–6–4
1952	East Maegashira #19; 7–8	East Maegashira #20; 6–9	West Maegashira #21; 7–8
Record given as wins–losses–absences Top division champion Top division runner-up Retired Lower divisions Non-participation Sanshō key: F=Fighting spirit; O=Outstanding performance; T=Technique Also shown: ★=Kinboshi; P=Playoff(s); Divisions: Makuuchi — Jūryō — Makushita — Sandanme — Jonidan — Jonokuchi Makuuchi ranks: Yokozuna — Ōzeki — Sekiwake — Komusubi — Maegashira

-	New Year Hatsu basho, Tokyo	Spring Haru basho, Osaka	Summer Natsu basho, Tokyo	Autumn Aki basho, Tokyo
1953	East Jūryō #1; 10–5	West Maegashira #14; 10–5	West Maegashira #9; 12–3; T	East Maegashira #1; 2–6–7
1954	West Maegashira #10; 12–3	West Maegashira #3; 1–5–9 ★	East Maegashira #10; 11–4; FT	West Komusubi; 6–9
1955	West Maegashira #1; 4–11	West Maegashira #6; 6–9	East Maegashira #9; 6–9	West Maegashira #12; 10–5
1956	East Maegashira #5; 5–10	East Maegashira #9; 8–7	East Maegashira #8; 7–8	West Maegashira #9; 9–6
Record given as wins–losses–absences Top division champion Top division runner-up Retired Lower divisions Non-participation Sanshō key: F=Fighting spirit; O=Outstanding performance; T=Technique Also shown: ★=Kinboshi; P=Playoff(s); Divisions: Makuuchi — Jūryō — Makushita — Sandanme — Jonidan — Jonokuchi Makuuchi ranks: Yokozuna — Ōzeki — Sekiwake — Komusubi — Maegashira

== Modern sumo record ==
- Since the addition of the Kyushu tournament in 1957 and the Nagoya tournament in 1958, the yearly schedule has remained unchanged.

Year	January Hatsu basho, Tokyo	March Haru basho, Osaka	May Natsu basho, Tokyo	July Nagoya basho, Nagoya	September Aki basho, Tokyo	November Kyūshū basho, Fukuoka
1957	West Maegashira #3; 3–12	East Maegashira #11; 12–3; T	East Maegashira #3; 9–6 ★	Not held	East Komusubi; 11–4; O	West Sekiwake; 5–9–1
1958	West Maegashira #1; 9–6; T★★	West Komusubi; 6–9	West Maegashira #1; 6–9	East Maegashira #4; 6–9	East Maegashira #7; 10–5 ★★	East Maegashira #1; 8–7; O
1959	West Komusubi; 7–8	West Maegashira #1; 8–7; O★	East Maegashira #1; 5–10	East Maegashira #5; 7–8	East Maegashira #6; 7–8	West Maegashira #7; 9–6
1960	East Maegashira #3; 9–6; O★	East Maegashira #1; 9–6; T★	West Komusubi; 10–5	West Sekiwake; 7–8	East Komusubi; 4–11	East Maegashira #5; 5–10
1961	East Maegashira #8; 9–6	East Maegashira #2; 5–10	West Maegashira #4; 7–8 ★	East Maegashira #5; 1–11–3	East Maegashira #12; 7–8	West Maegashira #13; 10–5
1962	East Maegashira #7; 5–10	West Maegashira #13; Retired; 5–10	x	x	x	x
Record given as wins–losses–absences Top division champion Top division runner-up Retired Lower divisions Non-participation Sanshō key: F=Fighting spirit; O=Outstanding performance; T=Technique Also shown: ★=Kinboshi; P=Playoff(s); Divisions: Makuuchi — Jūryō — Makushita — Sandanme — Jonidan — Jonokuchi Makuuchi ranks: Yokozuna — Ōzeki — Sekiwake — Komusubi — Maegashira

== See also ==
- List of top kinboshi earners
- List of past sumo wrestlers
- Glossary of sumo terms
- List of sekiwake
