= Dewanishiki Tadao =

Sumo wrestler

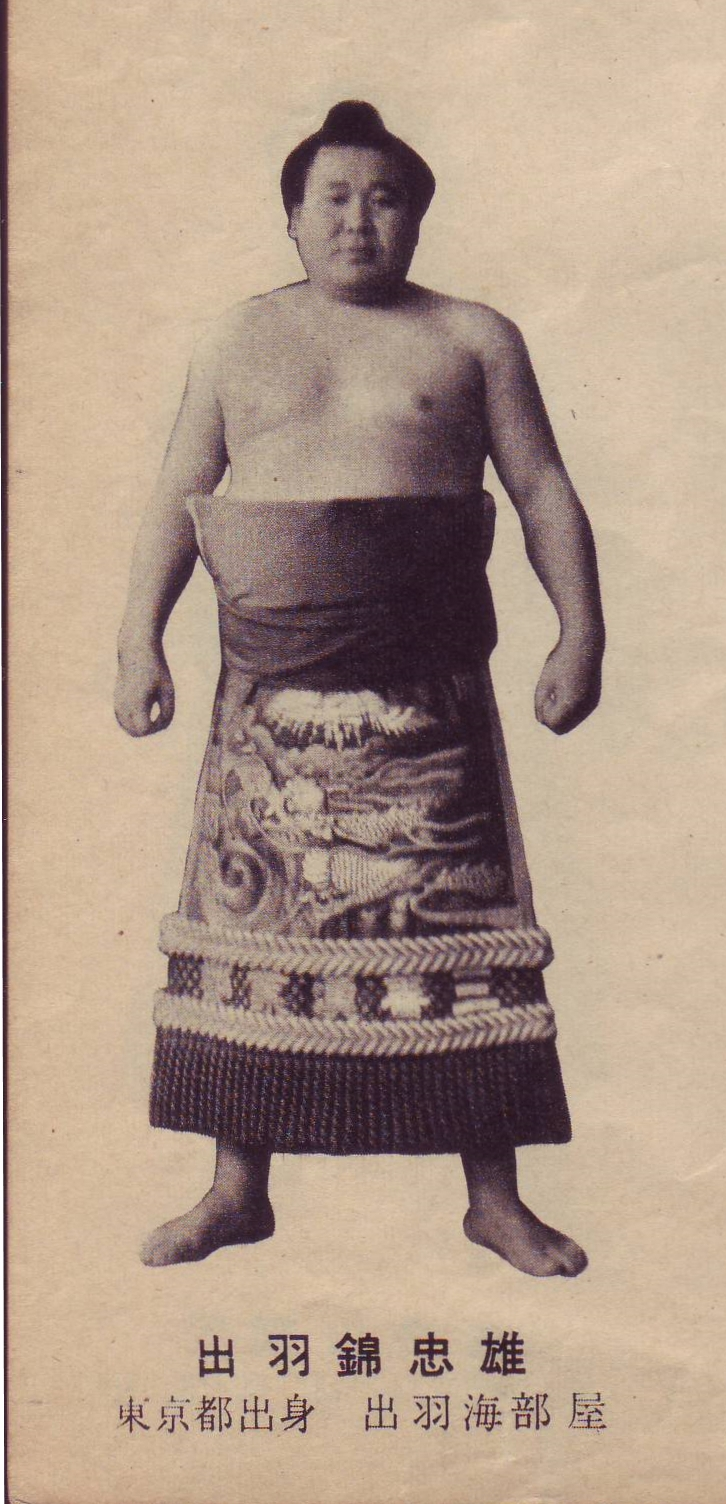

Personal information
- Native name: 出羽錦 忠雄
- Born: Tadao Kokura; July 15, 1925 Sumida-ku, Tokyo, Japan
- Died: January 1, 2005 (aged 79)
- Height: 1.81 m (5 ft 11 1/2 in)
- Weight: 143 kg (315 lb)

Sport
- Sport: Sumo
- Retired: September 1964
- Heya: Dewanoumi
- Record: 595-576-45-3d/1167
- Debut: May 1940
- Highest rank: Sekiwake (May 1956)
- Elder name: Tagonoura
- Championships: (1) (Juryo) (1) (Sandanme)
- Special Prizes: (3) (Outstanding Performance) (1) (Fighting Spirit)
- Gold Stars: 10 (2) Taiho (2) Wakanohana I (2) Asashio (2) Kagamisato (1) Maedayama (1) Haguroyama
- Updated on June 2020

Dewanishiki Tadao (July 15, 1925 – January 1, 2005) was a sumo wrestler from Sumida, Tokyo, Japan. His highest rank was sekiwake. He won ten kinboshi or gold stars for defeating yokozuna during his long top division career, which only four wrestlers have bettered. He also won four special prizes. After his retirement he was a coach at Dewanoumi stable.

== Career ==
He debuted in May 1940 and won his first yusho in sandanme in January 1944. He left sumo for portions of 1944 and 1945 but returned and saw success in jūryō, leading to a 9-1 record in June 1947 to capture the jūryō title. He was then promoted to makuuchi, earning a share of the jun-yūshō (runner-up) in only his first tournament in makuuchi with a 9-2 record. He continued on and earned his first kinboshi in October 1949, defeating yokozuna Maedayama Eigorō. In May 1950, he achieved the rank of komusubi. He achieved his highest career rank of sekiwake in May 1956, but had a 3-9-3 record which dropped him back to maegashira level. He achieved the rank of sekiwake twice more in January 1960 and September 1962, but again dropped down to the maegashira ranks, both times after a single tournament. He won his second Outstanding Performance Prize in 1961, 14 years after his first in 1947. He earned his tenth and final kinboshi in March 1963, defeating yokozuna Taihō Kōki on Day 4 of the tournament. He then retired in September 1964 after a 6-9 make-koshi record. As of 2017 only Akinoshima (16), Takamiyama and Tochinonada (12), and Tosanoumi (11) have earned more career kinboshi.

== Retirement from sumo ==
He remained in sumo as an elder of the Japan Sumo Association, working as a coach at Dewanoumi stable under the name Tagonoura Oyakata. He reached the mandatory retirement age of 65 in 1990. He died in 2005 at the age of 79.

== Pre-modern record ==
- Only two tournaments were held a year through much of the 1940s. The New Year tournament began and the Spring tournament returned to Osaka tournament in 1953.

Dewanishiki Tadao
-	Spring Haru basho, Tokyo	Summer Natsu basho, Tokyo	Autumn Aki basho, Tokyo
1941	(Maezumo)	(Maezumo)	Not held
1942	East Jonokuchi #16; 5–3	West Jonidan #31; 4–4	Not held
1943	East Jonidan #14; 4–4	East Jonidan #3; 6–2	Not held
1944	East Sandanme #20; 7–1; Champion	East Makushita #29; 5–0	East Makushita #3 –
1945	Not held	Left sumo	East Makushita #2; 4–1
1946	Not held	Not held	West Jūryō #7; 9–4
1947	Not held	East Jūryō #1; 9–1–P; Champion	West Maegashira #11; 9–2; O
1948	Not held	East Maegashira #4; 6–5	West Maegashira #2; 4–7
1949	East Maegashira #5; 6–7	East Maegashira #7; 9–6	East Maegashira #3; 8–7 ★
1950	East Maegashira #1; 8–7	West Komusubi; 3–12	East Maegashira #6; 11–4
1951	West Komusubi; 5–10	West Maegashira #3; 8–7	West Maegashira #1; 4–11
1952	East Maegashira #5; 10–5	West Komusubi; 8–7	East Komusubi; 6–9
Record given as wins–losses–absences Top division champion Top division runner-up Retired Lower divisions Non-participation Sanshō key: F=Fighting spirit; O=Outstanding performance; T=Technique Also shown: ★=Kinboshi; P=Playoff(s); Divisions: Makuuchi — Jūryō — Makushita — Sandanme — Jonidan — Jonokuchi Makuuchi ranks: Yokozuna — Ōzeki — Sekiwake — Komusubi — Maegashira

-	New Year Hatsu basho, Tokyo	Spring Haru basho, Osaka	Summer Natsu basho, Tokyo	Autumn Aki basho, Tokyo
1953	East Maegashira #2; 9–6 ★	West Komusubi; 8–7	West Komusubi; 4–11	West Maegashira #2; 9–6
1954	West Komusubi; 5–8–2	East Maegashira #2; 8–7	East Maegashira #1; 7–8 ★	West Maegashira #1; 6–9
1955	East Maegashira #3; 8–6; 1d)	West Maegashira #2; 4–10	East Maegashira #6; 6–9	East Maegashira #8; 12–3; F
1956	West Komusubi; 8–7	East Komusubi; 8–7	East Sekiwake #2; 3–9–3	East Maegashira #5; 5–10
Record given as wins–losses–absences Top division champion Top division runner-up Retired Lower divisions Non-participation Sanshō key: F=Fighting spirit; O=Outstanding performance; T=Technique Also shown: ★=Kinboshi; P=Playoff(s); Divisions: Makuuchi — Jūryō — Makushita — Sandanme — Jonidan — Jonokuchi Makuuchi ranks: Yokozuna — Ōzeki — Sekiwake — Komusubi — Maegashira

== Modern top division record ==
- Since the addition of the Kyushu tournament in 1957 and the Nagoya tournament in 1958, the yearly schedule has remained unchanged.

Year	January Hatsu basho, Tokyo	March Haru basho, Osaka	May Natsu basho, Tokyo	July Nagoya basho, Nagoya	September Aki basho, Tokyo	November Kyūshū basho, Fukuoka
1957	West Maegashira #7; 12–3	West Komusubi #2; 6–9	East Maegashira #2; 6–9	Not held	West Maegashira #5; 4–11	West Maegashira #9; 7–8
1958	East Maegashira #10; 10–5	East Maegashira #6; 9–6	West Maegashira #2; 6–9	East Maegashira #5; 8–7 ★	West Maegashira #2; 7–8	West Maegashira #2; 7–7; 1d
1959	East Maegashira #2; Sat out due to injury 0–0–15	East Maegashira #11; 5–6–4	East Maegashira #16; 11–4	West Maegashira #9; 10–5	West Maegashira #2; 10–5	West Komusubi; 9–6
1960	West Sekiwake #2; 6–9	West Maegashira #1; 5–10	West Maegashira #7; 9–6	West Maegashira #2; 9–6	East Komusubi #2; 5–10	East Maegashira #4; 6–9 ★
1961	East Maegashira #6; 8–7	West Maegashira #2; 3–8–4	West Maegashira #8; 8–7	East Maegashira #7; 9–4–2	East Maegashira #3; 11–4; O★★	East Komusubi #2; 5–10
1962	West Maegashira #5; 11–4	West Maegashira #1; 9–6	West Komusubi; 7–8	East Maegashira #1; 9–6; O★	East Sekiwake; 3–7–5	West Maegashira #4; 8–7
1963	East Maegashira #2; 6–9	East Maegashira #3; 7–8 ★	West Maegashira #3; 4–11	West Maegashira #8; 10–5	East Maegashira #1; 7–8	West Maegashira #1; 1–9–5
1964	East Maegashira #12; 7–8	West Maegashira #12; 8–7	East Maegashira #8; 6–9	West Maegashira #10; 7–8	East Maegashira #11; Retired; 6–9	x
Record given as wins–losses–absences Top division champion Top division runner-up Retired Lower divisions Non-participation Sanshō key: F=Fighting spirit; O=Outstanding performance; T=Technique Also shown: ★=Kinboshi; P=Playoff(s); Divisions: Makuuchi — Jūryō — Makushita — Sandanme — Jonidan — Jonokuchi Makuuchi ranks: Yokozuna — Ōzeki — Sekiwake — Komusubi — Maegashira

== See also ==
- List of sumo record holders
- List of sumo tournament second division champions
- Glossary of sumo terms
- List of past sumo wrestlers
- List of sekiwake
