= Kiyokuni Katsuo =

Japanese sumo wrestler

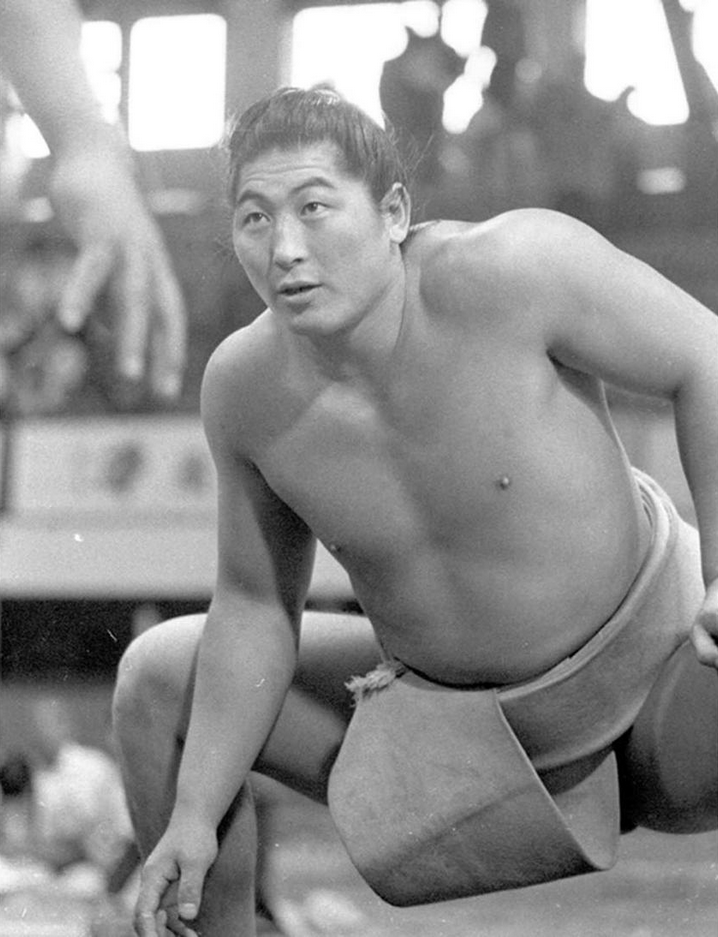

Personal information
- Native name: 清國 勝雄
- Born: Tadao Sato; 20 November 1941 (age 84) Ogachi, Akita, Japan
- Height: 1.82 m (5 ft 11 1/2 in)
- Weight: 134 kg (295 lb)

Sport
- Sport: Sumo
- Retired: January, 1974
- Heya: Isegahama
- Record: 706–507–32
- Debut: September, 1956
- Highest rank: Ōzeki (July 1969)
- Elder name: Isegahama
- Championships: 1 (Makuuchi)
- Special Prizes: Outstanding Performance (3); Technique (4)
- Gold Stars: 7 Tochinoumi (3); Kashiwado (2); Sadanoyama (2)
- Updated on June 2020

Kiyokuni Katsuo (born 20 November 1941 as Tadao Sato) is a former sumo wrestler from Ogachi, Akita, Japan. His highest rank was ōzeki, which he held from 1969 to 1974. He won one top division yūshō or tournament championship and was a runner-up in five other tournaments. He also earned seven special prizes and seven gold stars. After his retirement he was the head coach of Isegahama stable.

== Career ==
Recruited by former sekiwake Kiyosegawa, he made his professional debut in September 1956 (in the same tournament as Taihō). Initially fighting under the shikona of Wakaikuni, he rose slowly up the ranks, eventually reaching the second highest jūryō division in May 1963, after 26 tournaments in makushita. He was promoted to the top makuuchi division in November 1963. In just his second makuuchi tournament, ranked at maegashira 13, he produced a superb 14–1 record, losing only on the final day and finishing runner-up to yokozuna Taihō who won with an unbeaten score. (Because he was ranked so low he was not matched against Taihō during the tournament and so never had the chance to defeat him and force a playoff.) He was awarded the Technique Prize and was promoted straight to sekiwake, sumo's third highest rank – the biggest jump to sekiwake ever recorded in the six tournaments a year era. He defeated yokozuna in three consecutive tournaments from September 1964 to January 1965, earning promotion back to the san'yaku ranks.

After a year or so of being stuck at the sekiwake rank, Kiyokuni was finally promoted to ōzeki in May 1969 after his second runner-up performance. Although he had scored only 31 wins in the three tournaments prior to his promotion, below the usual threshold of 33, he immediately dispelled any doubts over his worthiness by taking what was to be his only tournament championship or yūshō in his ōzeki debut. He defeated Taihō for only the third time in 25 meetings on the final day and then beat maegashira Fujinokawa in a playoff after both had finished on 12–3. This was to be the last yūshō by a member of the Tatsunami-Isegahama ichimon or group of stables until ōzeki Asahifuji won his first championship in January 1988.

Kiyokuni was never able to make yokozuna, partly due to neck and spinal injuries from which he never fully recovered. Nevertheless, he was a strong ōzeki, remaining there for 28 basho and finishing runner-up in May 1971, May 1973 and September 1973. He retired in January 1974, due to a heart complaint.

== Retirement from sumo ==
Kiyokuni became an oyakata, or elder of the Japan Sumo Association after his retirement, and in April 1977 he became head coach of Isegahama stable following the death of his second stablemaster, former yokozuna Terukuni, who had been in charge since 1961. Initially he had some success, overseeing the late blooming Kurosegawa's rise to komusubi in 1980 and also producing Wakasegawa who reached the top division in 1983. However, On August 12, 1985 Isegahama's wife and two children died in the Japan Air Lines Flight 123 disaster. He was never the same again and the stable began to deteriorate. He was demoted from his position in the Sumo Association after giving an outspoken interview to the Shūkan Gendai in 2004 in which he criticised the attitude of amateur college champions and foreigners in sumo and made allegations of match-fixing and steroid abuse. By the time he reached the mandatory retirement age of sixty-five in November 2006, there were just two active wrestlers in Isegahama stable left, compared with dozens when he took over. Much to his chagrin he had not even been able to persuade his nephews, Tamanoshima and Tamamitsukuni to join, the two eventual sekitori opting for Kataonami stable instead. With no long term successor to Kiyokuni available, former maegashira Katsuhikari took on the Isegahama name, but he dissolved the stable, which dated back to 1859, on February 1, 2007. Its two remaining wrestlers moved to Kiriyama stable. In an attempt to revive the fortunes of the once prestigious Isegahama name, it was assumed by the former Asahifuji in December of that year, who renamed his existing Ajigawa stable to Isegahama stable.

== Fighting style ==
Kiyokuni favoured techniques were hidari-yotsu (a right hand outside, left hand inside grip on his opponent's mawashi), yorikiri (force out), and oshidashi (push out).

== Career record ==
- The Kyushu tournament was first held in 1957, and the Nagoya tournament in 1958.

Kiyokuni Katsuo
Year	January Hatsu basho, Tokyo	March Haru basho, Osaka	May Natsu basho, Tokyo	July Nagoya basho, Nagoya	September Aki basho, Tokyo	November Kyūshū basho, Fukuoka
1956	x	x	x	x	(Maezumo)	Not held
1957	West Jonokuchi #15; 4–4	East Jonidan #108; 7–1	West Jonidan #41; 5–3	Not held	West Jonidan #2; 2–5	East Jonidan #6; 5–2
1958	West Sandanme #81; 6–2	West Sandanme #53; 6–2	East Sandanme #29; 3–5	East Sandanme #30; 5–3	West Sandanme #18; 6–2	West Sandanme #2; 7–1
1959	West Makushita #63; 7–1	East Makushita #40; 6–2	East Makushita #30; 4–4	West Makushita #29; 3–5	West Makushita #33; 6–2	West Makushita #20; 4–4
1960	West Makushita #21; 5–3	West Makushita #15; 6–2	West Makushita #6; 2–6	East Makushita #17; 3–3–1	West Makushita #18; 5–2	West Makushita #11; 6–1
1961	West Makushita #3; 4–3	East Makushita #2; 4–3	West Makushita #1; 1–6	West Makushita #9; 3–4	West Makushita #10; 6–1	East Makushita #3; 3–4
1962	East Makushita #5; 5–2	West Makushita #1; 2–5	West Makushita #8; 3–4	East Makushita #10; 4–3	West Makushita #7; 5–2	East Makushita #3; 4–3
1963	East Makushita #2; 5–2	East Makushita #1; 4–3	East Jūryō #17; 10–5	East Jūryō #14; 12–3	West Jūryō #3; 10–5	West Maegashira #14; 8–7
1964	East Maegashira #13; 14–1; T	West Sekiwake #1; 6–9	East Maegashira #2; 7–8	East Maegashira #2; 8–7	West Maegashira #1; 5–10 ★	East Maegashira #4; 9–6 ★
1965	West Maegashira #1; 10–5; T★	East Komusubi #1; 9–6; T	East Sekiwake #1; 7–8	West Komusubi #1; 10–5; O	East Sekiwake #1; 4–11	East Maegashira #4; 9–6 ★
1966	East Maegashira #2; 7–8	West Maegashira #3; 9–6 ★	East Komusubi #1; 4–11	West Maegashira #3; 9–6 ★	West Komusubi #1; 8–7	East Sekiwake #1; 7–8
1967	East Komusubi #1; 3–12	West Maegashira #5; 9–6	West Maegashira #2; 7–8	West Maegashira #1; 7–8	West Maegashira #2; 8–7 ★	East Komusubi #1; 8–7
1968	West Sekiwake #1; 9–6; O	East Sekiwake #1; 10–5	East Sekiwake #1; 8–7	East Sekiwake #1; 8–7	East Sekiwake #1; 8–7	East Sekiwake #1; 7–8
1969	West Komusubi #1; 10–5; O	West Sekiwake #1; 9–6	West Sekiwake #1; 12–3; T	East Ōzeki #1; 12–3–P	East Ōzeki #1; 9–6	West Ōzeki #2; 9–6
1970	West Ōzeki #2; 10–5	East Ōzeki #1; 7–8	West Ōzeki #1; 10–5	East Ōzeki #1; 11–4	East Ōzeki #1; 9–6	West Ōzeki #1; 12–3
1971	East Ōzeki #1; 8–7	West Ōzeki #2; 10–5	East Ōzeki #2; 13–2	East Ōzeki #1; 9–6	West Ōzeki #1; 8–7	East Ōzeki #2; 8–7
1972	West Ōzeki #1; 9–6	West Ōzeki #1; 10–5	West Ōzeki #1; 8–7	West Ōzeki #1; 9–6	East Ōzeki #1; 9–6	East Ōzeki #2; 10–5
1973	East Ōzeki #2; 1–6–8	West Ōzeki #2; 9–6	West Ōzeki #1; 11–4	East Ōzeki #1; 1–5–9	West Ōzeki #2; 11–4	East Ōzeki #1; 0–7–8
1974	West Ōzeki #2; Retired; 0–0–6	x	x	x	x	x
Record given as wins–losses–absences Top division champion Top division runner-up Retired Lower divisions Non-participation Sanshō key: F=Fighting spirit; O=Outstanding performance; T=Technique Also shown: ★=Kinboshi; P=Playoff(s); Divisions: Makuuchi — Jūryō — Makushita — Sandanme — Jonidan — Jonokuchi Makuuchi ranks: Yokozuna — Ōzeki — Sekiwake — Komusubi — Maegashira

== See also ==
- Glossary of sumo terms
- List of past sumo wrestlers
- List of sumo tournament top division champions
- List of sumo tournament top division runners-up
- List of ōzeki
