= Tōryū Kenji =

Japanese sumo wrestler

Personal information
- Native name: 闘竜 賢二
- Born: Kenji Tanaka; 19 December 1958 (age 67) Kakogawa, Hyōgo, Japan
- Height: 1.80 m (5 ft 11 in)
- Weight: 153 kg (337 lb)

Sport
- Sport: Sumo
- Retired: January, 1990
- Heya: Mihogaseki
- Record: 576-607-18
- Debut: March, 1974
- Highest rank: Sekiwake (May, 1984)
- Elder name: Nakadachi
- Special Prizes: Fighting Spirit (1)
- Gold Stars: 2 (Wakanohana II)
- Updated on June 25, 2020

Tōryū Kenji (born 19 December 1958 as Kenji Tanaka) is a former sumo wrestler from Kakogawa, Hyōgo, Japan. He made his professional debut in March 1974, and reached the top division in November 1979. His highest rank was sekiwake. He retired in January 1990.

== Career record ==
Tōryū Kenji
Year	January Hatsu basho, Tokyo	March Haru basho, Osaka	May Natsu basho, Tokyo	July Nagoya basho, Nagoya	September Aki basho, Tokyo	November Kyūshū basho, Fukuoka
1974	x	(Maezumo)	West Jonokuchi #6; 4–3	West Jonidan #85; 5–2	West Jonidan #49; 3–4	East Jonidan #64; 6–1
1975	West Jonidan #21; 5–2	West Sandanme #66; 5–2	West Sandanme #35; 2–5	West Sandanme #57; 3–4	West Sandanme #70; 4–3	East Sandanme #51; 5–2
1976	East Sandanme #28; 4–3	East Sandanme #16; 4–3	West Sandanme #3; 2–5	East Sandanme #23; 6–1	West Makushita #48; 4–3	West Makushita #35; 4–3
1977	East Makushita #27; 4–3	East Makushita #19; 3–4	West Makushita #24; 5–2	West Makushita #11; 4–3	East Makushita #8; 4–3	East Makushita #6; 1–6
1978	East Makushita #31; 4–3	West Makushita #24; 5–2	East Makushita #12; 4–3	East Makushita #6; 4–3	West Makushita #3; 4–3	East Makushita #1; 5–2
1979	West Jūryō #11; 7–8	East Jūryō #13; 10–5	West Jūryō #4; 7–8	West Jūryō #4; 8–7	East Jūryō #2; 10–5–P	East Maegashira #11; 7–8
1980	East Maegashira #14; 8–7	West Maegashira #11; 8–7	West Maegashira #8; 7–8	East Maegashira #10; 10–5	East Maegashira #3; 3–9–3	West Maegashira #11; Sat out due to injury 0–0–15
1981	West Maegashira #11; 4–11	West Jūryō #3; 11–4	East Maegashira #13; 10–5	West Maegashira #8; 7–8	West Maegashira #9; 4–11	West Jūryō #2; 10–5
1982	West Maegashira #12; 9–6	West Maegashira #4; 7–8	West Maegashira #6; 8–7	West Maegashira #2; 8–7; F★	West Komusubi #1; 8–7	East Komusubi #1; 6–9
1983	East Maegashira #3; 6–9 ★	East Maegashira #7; 8–7	East Maegashira #1; 5–10	West Maegashira #5; 8–7	East Maegashira #1; 5–10	West Maegashira #6; 8–7
1984	West Maegashira #2; 6–9	East Maegashira #4; 8–7	West Sekiwake #1; 6–9	East Maegashira #2; 5–10	East Maegashira #9; 8–7	West Maegashira #4; 6–9
1985	West Maegashira #8; 8–7	East Maegashira #5; 5–10	West Maegashira #11; 9–6	West Maegashira #5; 4–11	West Maegashira #12; 8–7	East Maegashira #8; 8–7
1986	West Maegashira #2; 3–12	West Maegashira #11; 9–6	West Maegashira #3; 4–11	West Maegashira #10; 8–7	East Maegashira #5; 6–9	West Maegashira #8; 8–7
1987	West Maegashira #3; 2–13	East Maegashira #12; 8–7	West Maegashira #9; 7–8	East Maegashira #12; 8–7	East Maegashira #8; 6–9	West Maegashira #11; 8–7
1988	West Maegashira #10; 7–8	West Maegashira #12; 5–10	West Jūryō #2; 10–5	East Maegashira #13; 6–9	East Jūryō #2; 5–10	West Jūryō #7; 6–9
1989	East Jūryō #12; 8–7	West Jūryō #11; 8–7	East Jūryō #9; 8–7	East Jūryō #8; 6–9	East Jūryō #11; 9–6	East Jūryō #8; 6–9
1990	West Jūryō #12; Retired; 4–11	x	x	x	x	x
Record given as wins–losses–absences Top division champion Top division runner-up Retired Lower divisions Non-participation Sanshō key: F=Fighting spirit; O=Outstanding performance; T=Technique Also shown: ★=Kinboshi; P=Playoff(s); Divisions: Makuuchi — Jūryō — Makushita — Sandanme — Jonidan — Jonokuchi Makuuchi ranks: Yokozuna — Ōzeki — Sekiwake — Komusubi — Maegashira

== See also ==
- Glossary of sumo terms
- List of past sumo wrestlers
- List of sekiwake
