= Wakamaeda Eiichirō =

Japanese sumo wrestler (1930–2007)

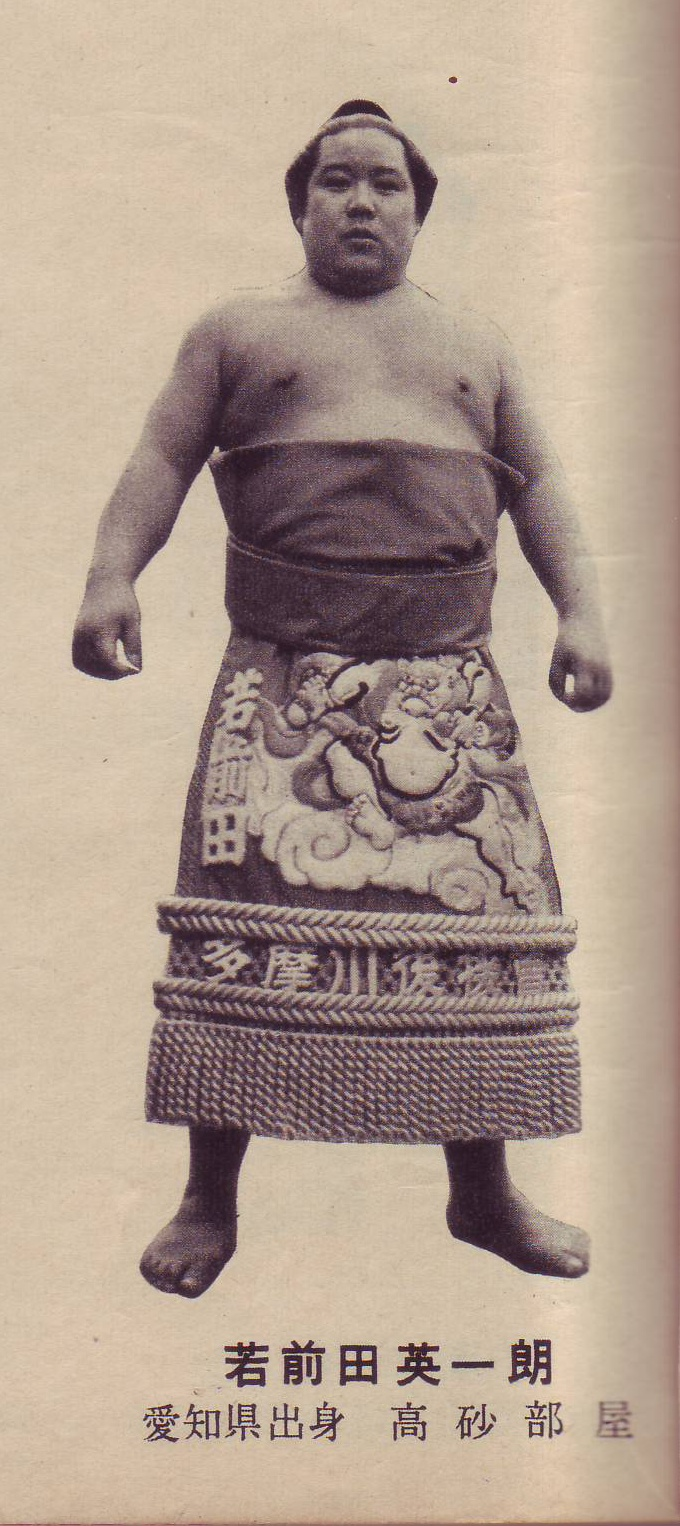

Personal information
- Native name: 若前田英一朗
- Born: Yui Hideo; 24 November 1930 Nishibiwajima, Aichi
- Died: 3 June 2007 (aged 76)
- Height: 174 cm (69 in)
- Weight: 129 kg (284 lb)

Sport
- Sport: Sumo
- Retired: January 1964
- Heya: Takasago
- Record: 484-475-9
- Debut: January 1950
- Highest rank: Sekiwake (May 1958)
- Elder name: Onoe
- Championships: 1 (Sandanme); 1 (Jonokuchi)
- Special Prizes: 3 (Fighting Spirit); 1 (Technique)
- Gold Stars: 3

Wakamaeda Eiichirō (born Hideo Yui; 24 November 1930 – 3 June 2007) was a sumo wrestler from Nishibiwajima, Aichi, Japan. Making his professional debut in January 1950, he reached the top makuuchi division in May 1954. His highest rank was sekiwake. He won four special prizes and three gold stars for defeating yokozuna. He retired in January 1964 and became an elder of the Japan Sumo Association under the name of Onoe.

== Career ==
Born in Nishikasugai District, Aichi, in the town of Nishibiwajima, he was spotted by scouts on a 1949 regional tour of Nagoya and joined Takasago stable in January 1950. Initially he fought under his own surname of Yui, but in 1952 changed his shikona to Wakamaeda, with the second kanji of Maeda taken from his stablemaster, the former yokozuna Maedayama. He reached the jūryō division in March 1953 and the top makuuchi division in May 1954. In his top division debut he was suffering from acute appendicitis from Day 9 but managed to stay in the tournament with pain-killing injections, and only withdrew on Day 13 once he had clinched a majority of wins against losses, or kachi-koshi. In May 1955 he defeated Yoshibayama in his first ever bout against a yokozuna, earning his first kinboshi, and he made his sanyaku debut at komusubi in January 1958, after a strong 11–4 record in the previous tournament. His komusubi debut was a memorable one as he defeated two yokozuna (Yoshibayama and Kagamisato) and was awarded the Fighting Sprit prize. Two 10–5 records in the next two tournaments, which included wins over yokozuna Wakanohana and Chiyonoyama, saw him move up to sekiwake and win two more Fighting Spirit prizes. However his quest for ōzeki promotion was ended when he scored only 5–10 in July 1958. He returned to komusubi in January 1959, defeating Tochinishiki and winning the Technique prize, and was promoted back to sekiwake for the March 1959 tournament, but narrowly failed to get a majority of wins. His 3–12 at komusubi in the following May 1959 tournament was his final appearance in the sanyaku ranks. He was to win two further kinboshi, both against Wakanohana, in November 1960 and January 1962. He was finally demoted from the top division in September 1963 after a poor 2–13 score. He had fought in makuuchi for 50 tournaments, with a win-loss record of 355–389, with 6 injury absences. He retired two tournaments later in January 1964.

== Retirement ==
His danpatsu-shiki, or official retirement ceremony was held in July 1964 in the same hall as the Nagoya tournament that year, the Kanayama Gymnasium. He remained in sumo as a coach for a short time, under the elder name of Onoe. After leaving the Japan Sumo Association in September 1964 he ran a sumo restaurant in Nagoya. He died in June 2007 at the age of 76.

== Career record ==
Wakamaeda Eiichirō
Year	January Hatsu basho, Tokyo	March Haru basho, Osaka	May Natsu basho, Tokyo	July Nagoya basho, Nagoya	September Aki basho, Tokyo	November Kyūshū basho, Fukuoka
1950	(Maezumo)	x	East Jonokuchi #2; 10–5; Champion	x	East Jonidan #6; 7–5–3	x
1951	East Jonidan #3; 10–5	x	West Sandanme #21; 11–4	x	West Sandanme #4; 12–3; Champion	x
1952	West Makushita #15; 7–8	x	West Makushita #16; 9–6	x	East Makushita #7; 7–8	x
1953	West Makushita #8; 11–4	West Jūryō #20; 7–8	West Makushita #1; 5–3	x	West Jūryō #18; 9–6	x
1954	West Jūryō #15; 9–6	East Jūryō #6; 11–4	West Maegashira #20; 8–4–3	x	West Maegashira #13; 6–9	x
1955	West Maegashira #16; 9–6	West Maegashira #12; 11–4	East Maegashira #4; 4–11 ★	x	West Maegashira #9; 6–9	x
1956	West Maegashira #12; 9–6	West Maegashira #3; 8–7	West Maegashira #1; 7–8	x	East Maegashira #3; 5–10	x
1957	East Maegashira #5; 6–9	West Maegashira #8; 9–6	West Maegashira #3; 5–10	x	East Maegashira #8; 8–7	East Maegashira #7; 11–4
1958	West Komusubi #2; 8–7; F	East Komusubi; 10–5; F	East Sekiwake; 10–5; F	East Sekiwake; 5–10	West Maegashira #1; 4–11	East Maegashira #7; 11–4
1959	East Komusubi #2; 10–5; T	East Sekiwake #2; 7–8	West Komusubi; 3–12	West Maegashira #5; 5–10	West Maegashira #9; 7–8	West Maegashira #10; 10–5
1960	West Maegashira #4; 6–9	East Maegashira #7; 9–6	West Maegashira #5; 5–7–3	West Maegashira #9; 7–8	West Maegashira #7; 9–6	West Maegashira #4; 5–10 ★
1961	West Maegashira #7; 9–6	West Maegashira #1; 5–10	East Maegashira #4; 5–10	East Maegashira #9; 10–5	West Maegashira #3; 6–9	West Maegashira #6; 9–6
1962	West Maegashira #3; 5–10 ★	East Maegashira #7; 5–10	West Maegashira #9; 8–7	East Maegashira #9; 5–10	West Maegashira #12; 6–9	West Maegashira #15; 8–7
1963	West Maegashira #11; 7–8	East Maegashira #12; 8–7	East Maegashira #9; 6–9	East Maegashira #13; 8–7	West Maegashira #10; 2–13	West Jūryō #1; 4–11
1964	East Jūryō #5; Retired; 0–0–15	x	x	x	x	x
Record given as wins–losses–absences Top division champion Top division runner-up Retired Lower divisions Non-participation Sanshō key: F=Fighting spirit; O=Outstanding performance; T=Technique Also shown: ★=Kinboshi; P=Playoff(s); Divisions: Makuuchi — Jūryō — Makushita — Sandanme — Jonidan — Jonokuchi Makuuchi ranks: Yokozuna — Ōzeki — Sekiwake — Komusubi — Maegashira

== See also ==
- Glossary of sumo terms
- List of past sumo wrestlers
- List of sekiwake
