= Fusanishiki Katsuhiko =

Japanese sumo wrestler

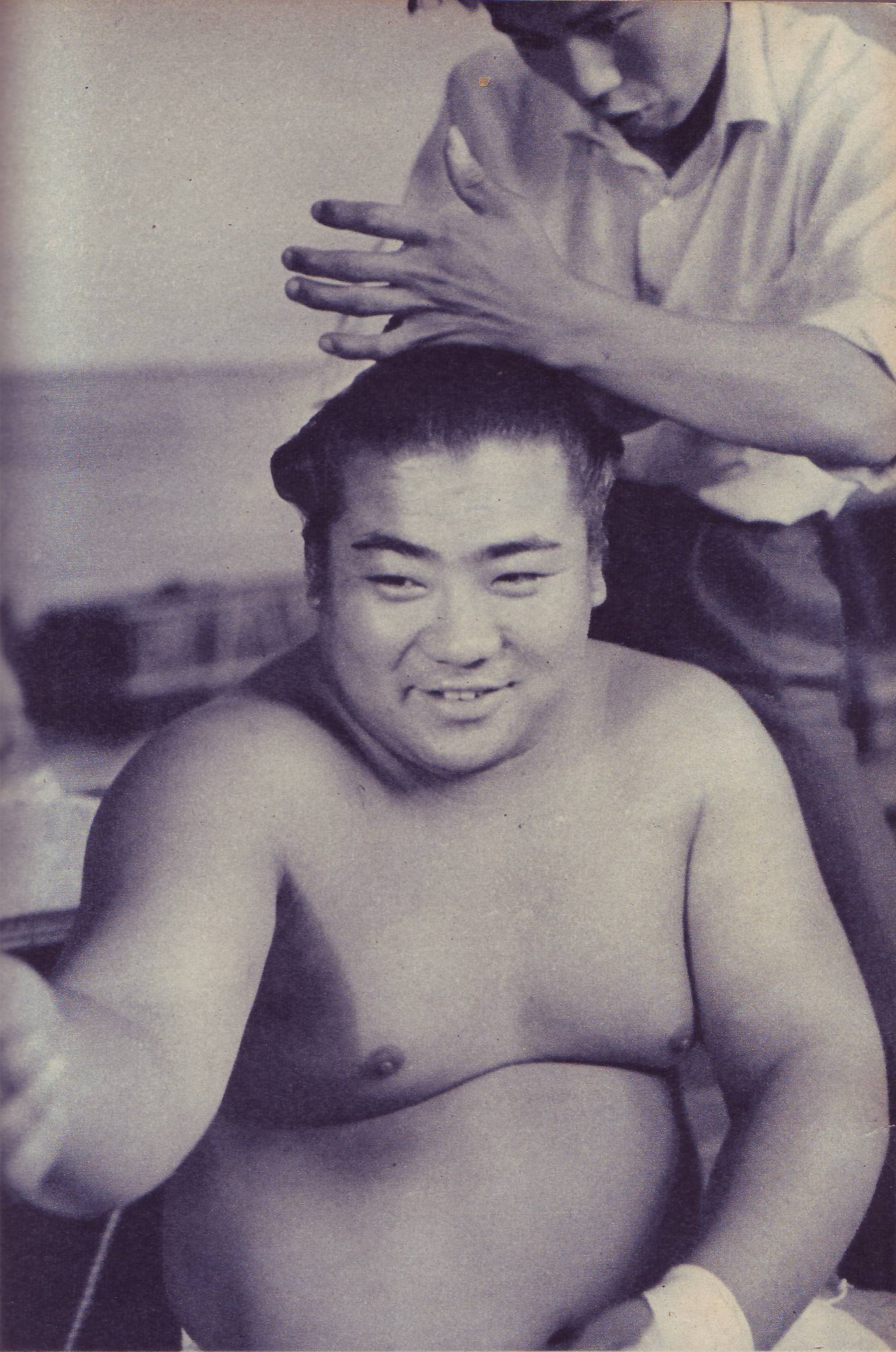

Personal information
- Native name: 房錦勝比古
- Born: Seisho Sakura; January 3, 1936 Ichikawa, Chiba, Japan
- Died: July 21, 1993 (aged 57)
- Height: 1.76 m (5 ft 9 1/2 in)
- Weight: 118 kg (260 lb; 18.6 st)

Sport
- Sport: Sumo
- Retired: January, 1967
- Heya: Wakamatsu → Nishiiwa → Wakamatsu
- Record: 514-533-11
- Debut: January, 1952
- Highest rank: Sekiwake (July, 1959)
- Elder name: Wakamatsu
- Championships: 1 (Jūryō)
- Special Prizes: Outstanding Performance (2); Fighting Spirit (1); Technique (2)
- Gold Stars: 6 Chiyonoyama (2); Kagamisato; Wakanohana I Taihō; Kashiwado
- Updated on June 2020

Fusanishiki Katsuhiko (born Seisho Sakura; January 3, 1936 – July 21, 1993) was a sumo wrestler from Ichikawa, Chiba, Japan. He made his professional debut in January 1952 and reached the top division in May 1957. His highest rank was sekiwake . Upon retirement from active competition, he became an elder in the Japan Sumo Association. He married the daughter of his stable master, ex-maegashira Shachinosato. He was head coach at Wakamatsu stable from 1979 until 1990, when he left the Sumo Association because of poor health. Former ōzeki Asashio Tarō IV took over as Wakamatsu's head coach in March 1990.

== Pre-modern career record ==
- The New year tournament began and the Spring tournament returned to Osaka in 1953.

Fusanishiki Katsuhiko
-	Spring Haru basho, Tokyo	Summer Natsu basho, Tokyo	Autumn Aki basho, Tokyo
1952	(Maezumo)	East Jonokuchi #1; 4–4	West Jonidan #18; 4–4
Record given as wins–losses–absences Top division champion Top division runner-up Retired Lower divisions Non-participation Sanshō key: F=Fighting spirit; O=Outstanding performance; T=Technique Also shown: ★=Kinboshi; P=Playoff(s); Divisions: Makuuchi — Jūryō — Makushita — Sandanme — Jonidan — Jonokuchi Makuuchi ranks: Yokozuna — Ōzeki — Sekiwake — Komusubi — Maegashira

-	New Year Hatsu basho, Tokyo	Spring Haru basho, Osaka	Summer Natsu basho, Tokyo	Autumn Aki basho, Tokyo
1953	East Jonidan #9; 6–2	West Sandanme #47; 2–6	West Sandanme #54; 5–3	West Sandanme #43; 4–4
1954	West Sandanme #40; 5–3	East Sandanme #22; 5–3	West Sandanme #8; 5–3	East Makushita #43; 5–3
1955	East Makushita #33; 4–4	West Makushita #32; 4–4	West Makushita #30; 4–4	West Makushita #27; 5–3
1956	East Makushita #19; 6–2	East Makushita #8; 6–2	West Jūryō #23; 9–6	West Jūryō #17; 9–6
Record given as wins–losses–absences Top division champion Top division runner-up Retired Lower divisions Non-participation Sanshō key: F=Fighting spirit; O=Outstanding performance; T=Technique Also shown: ★=Kinboshi; P=Playoff(s); Divisions: Makuuchi — Jūryō — Makushita — Sandanme — Jonidan — Jonokuchi Makuuchi ranks: Yokozuna — Ōzeki — Sekiwake — Komusubi — Maegashira

== Modern career record ==
- Since the addition of the Kyushu tournament in 1957 and the Nagoya tournament in 1958, the yearly schedule has remained unchanged.

Year	January Hatsu basho, Tokyo	March Haru basho, Osaka	May Natsu basho, Tokyo	July Nagoya basho, Nagoya	September Aki basho, Tokyo	November Kyūshū basho, Fukuoka
1957	East Jūryō #10; 9–6	East Jūryō #7; 13–2; Champion	West Maegashira #20; 11–4; F	Not held	East Maegashira #5; 7–8 ★	West Maegashira #5; 5–10
1958	East Maegashira #11; 9–6	East Maegashira #9; 11–4	East Maegashira #3; 4–11	West Maegashira #7; 8–7	West Maegashira #5; 6–9 ★	West Maegashira #8; 10–5
1959	West Maegashira #3; 3–12 ★	East Maegashira #9; 12–3	West Maegashira #1; 9–6; T	West Sekiwake #1; 9–6	West Sekiwake #1; 2–13	East Maegashira #2; 7–8
1960	West Maegashira #2; 6–9	West Maegashira #5; 9–6	East Maegashira #3; 6–9	East Maegashira #5; 7–8	East Maegashira #4; 8–7	West Maegashira #2; 9–6; O★
1961	East Komusubi #1; 8–7; O	East Komusubi #1; 9–6; T	East Sekiwake #2; 5–10	West Maegashira #2; 4–11	East Maegashira #6; 8–7	West Maegashira #3; 5–10
1962	East Maegashira #11; 8–7	West Maegashira #10; 12–3	East Maegashira #1; 5–10 ★	East Maegashira #8; 6–9	East Maegashira #11; 8–4–3	West Maegashira #9; 8–7
1963	West Maegashira #4; 5–10	East Maegashira #7; 6–5–4	West Maegashira #9; 7–8	East Maegashira #10; 6–9	West Maegashira #13; 11–4	East Maegashira #3; 3–12 ★
1964	West Maegashira #10; 6–9	East Maegashira #13; 8–7	East Maegashira #9; 6–9	West Maegashira #11; 8–7	East Maegashira #8; 8–7	West Maegashira #6; 8–7
1965	East Maegashira #4; 3–12	East Maegashira #11; 9–6	East Maegashira #6; 4–11	West Maegashira #13; 7–8	West Maegashira #14; 3–12	East Jūryō #6; 5–10
1966	East Jūryō #13; 8–7	West Jūryō #8; 6–9	East Jūryō #11; 8–7	West Jūryō #8; 5–6–4	West Jūryō #12; 8–7	West Jūryō #7; 5–10
1967	East Jūryō #14; Retired; 3–12–0	x	x	x	x	x
Record given as wins–losses–absences Top division champion Top division runner-up Retired Lower divisions Non-participation Sanshō key: F=Fighting spirit; O=Outstanding performance; T=Technique Also shown: ★=Kinboshi; P=Playoff(s); Divisions: Makuuchi — Jūryō — Makushita — Sandanme — Jonidan — Jonokuchi Makuuchi ranks: Yokozuna — Ōzeki — Sekiwake — Komusubi — Maegashira

== See also ==
- Glossary of sumo terms
- List of past sumo wrestlers
- List of sumo tournament second division champions
- List of sekiwake
