= Kairyūyama Teruhisa =

Japanese sumo wrestler (1939–1986)

Personal information
- Native name: 開隆山 勘之亟
- Born: Kannojo Aoki; August 28, 1939 Shōwa, Akita, Japan
- Died: September 10, 1986 (aged 47)
- Height: 1.79 m (5 ft 10 1/2 in)
- Weight: 116 kg (256 lb)

Sport
- Sport: Sumo
- Retired: March, 1968
- Heya: Araiso → Isegahama
- Record: 451-441-6
- Debut: March, 1956
- Highest rank: Sekiwake (May, 1964)
- Elder name: Kiriyama
- Championships: 1 (Jūryō); 1 (Sandanme); 1 (Jonidan)
- Special Prizes: Outstanding Performance (3)
- Gold Stars: 8 Taihō (3); Tochinoumi (3); Kashiwado (2)
- Updated on June 2020

Kairyūyama Teruhisa (born Kannojo Aoki; August 28, 1939 - September 10, 1986) was a sumo wrestler from Shōwa, Akita, Japan. He made his professional debut in March 1956 and reached the top division in July 1960. His highest rank was sekiwake. He won eight gold stars against grand champion yokozuna in the course of his career. Upon retirement from active competition he became an elder in the Japan Sumo Association under the name Kiriyama. He left the Sumo Association in December 1980.

== Career record ==
- The Kyushu tournament was first held in 1957, and the Nagoya tournament in 1958.

Kairyūyama Teruhisa
Year	January Hatsu basho, Tokyo	March Haru basho, Osaka	May Natsu basho, Tokyo	July Nagoya basho, Nagoya	September Aki basho, Tokyo	November Kyūshū basho, Fukuoka
1956	x	(Maezumo)	East Jonokuchi #24; 6–2	Not held	East Jonidan #74; 8–0–P; Champion	Not held
1957	West Sandanme #78; 8–0; Champion	West Makushita #74; 4–4	West Makushita #73; 6–2	Not held	West Makushita #54; 4–4	East Makushita #53; 6–2
1958	East Makushita #43; 5–3	East Makushita #40; 7–1–P	East Makushita #19; 6–2	West Makushita #4; 6–2	East Makushita #2; 3–5	East Makushita #6; 3–5
1959	East Makushita #9; 5–3	East Makushita #7; 5–3	West Makushita #4; 5–3	East Makushita #2; 5–3	West Makushita #1; 5–3	West Jūryō #20; 9–6
1960	East Jūryō #15; 10–5	East Jūryō #8; 8–7	East Jūryō #8; 12–3; Champion	West Maegashira #16; 8–7	West Maegashira #12; 10–5	East Maegashira #6; 4–11
1961	East Maegashira #9; 7–8	West Maegashira #9; 9–6	West Maegashira #3; 6–9	East Maegashira #6; 9–6	East Maegashira #2; 8–7	East Maegashira #1; 9–6; O★★
1962	East Komusubi #2; 4–11	West Maegashira #5; 6–9	West Maegashira #6; 11–4	East Komusubi #1; 6–9	East Maegashira #3; 6–9	East Maegashira #5; 9–6
1963	West Maegashira #1; 5–10	East Maegashira #4; 9–6	East Maegashira #1; 7–8	East Maegashira #2; 4–11	West Maegashira #7; 7–8	East Maegashira #8; 7–8
1964	West Maegashira #9; 8–7	West Maegashira #2; 9–6; O★	West Sekiwake #1; 5–10	West Maegashira #2; 6–9 ★	East Maegashira #5; 9–6; O★	West Sekiwake #1; 5–10
1965	West Maegashira #3; 6–9 ★	West Maegashira #5; 10–5	East Maegashira #1; 5–10 ★★	West Maegashira #5; 7–8	West Maegashira #6; 7–8	East Maegashira #7; 7–8
1966	East Maegashira #8; 7–8	East Maegashira #9; 7–8	West Maegashira #9; 9–6	West Maegashira #4; 1–14	East Maegashira #12; 7–8	West Maegashira #12; 9–6
1967	West Maegashira #5; 7–8	East Maegashira #6; 6–9	West Maegashira #11; 8–7	West Maegashira #7; 6–9	East Maegashira #10; 4–11	West Jūryō #3; 7–8
1968	East Jūryō #4; 2–7–6	East Jūryō #13; Retired; 0–4–11	x	x	x	x
Record given as wins–losses–absences Top division champion Top division runner-up Retired Lower divisions Non-participation Sanshō key: F=Fighting spirit; O=Outstanding performance; T=Technique Also shown: ★=Kinboshi; P=Playoff(s); Divisions: Makuuchi — Jūryō — Makushita — Sandanme — Jonidan — Jonokuchi Makuuchi ranks: Yokozuna — Ōzeki — Sekiwake — Komusubi — Maegashira

== See also ==
- Glossary of sumo terms
- List of past sumo wrestlers
- List of sumo tournament second division champions
- List of sekiwake
