= Bishūyama Jun'ichi =

Japanese sumo wrestler

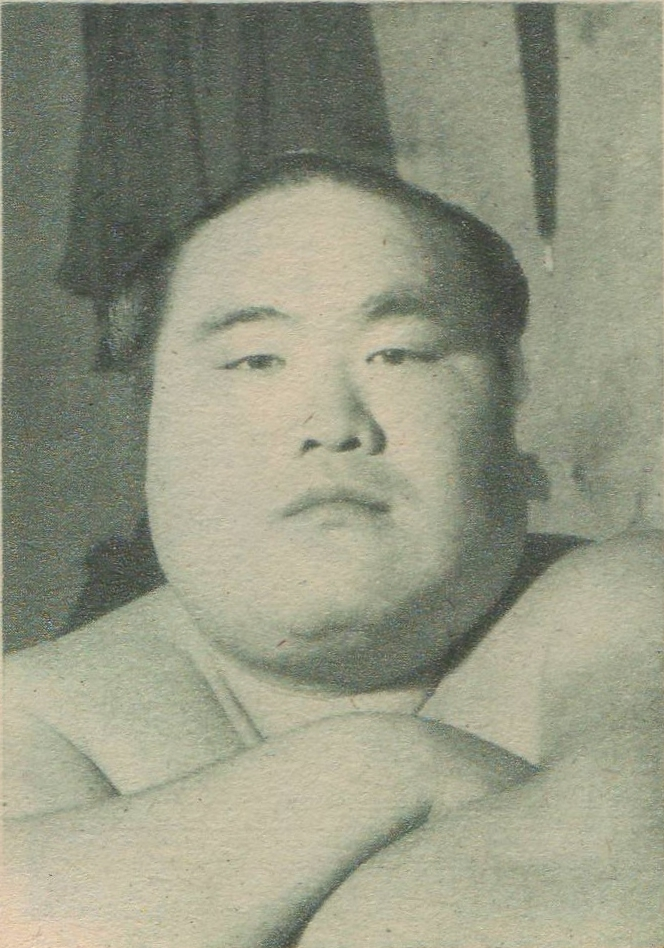

Personal information
- Native name: 備州山 順一
- Born: Jun'ichi Mitsuya; November 14, 1919 Fukuyama, Hiroshima, Japan
- Died: March 19, 1962 (aged 42)
- Height: 1.67 m (5 ft 5 1/2 in)
- Weight: 128 kg (282 lb)

Sport
- Sport: Sumo
- Retired: March, 1955
- Heya: Isegahama, Araiso
- Record: 272-304-22
- Debut: January, 1936
- Highest rank: Sekiwake (November 1945)
- Elder name: Kiriyama
- Championships: 1 (Makuuchi)
- Gold Stars: 5 Haguroyama (4); Maedayama
- Updated on June 2020

Bishūyama Jun'ichi (1919-1962) was a professional sumo wrestler born as Jun'ichi Mitsuya in Hiroshima, Japan. His highest rank was sekiwake.

== Life and career ==
He joined Isegahama stable and at 16 first entered the ring in the 1936 Spring tournament. From this point he never suffered a losing tournament until making the makuuchi top division in the Spring 1941 tournament. Though he actually had losing tournaments in his first three tournaments in makuuchi, he still rose in the rankings. This happened fairly often during these times and was due to the fact that East ranked and West ranked wrestlers were treated as two separate groups and if enough wrestlers from one side received bad losing records, other wrestlers from the same side had to be promoted to replace their slot in the rankings for the next tournament even if their records were not much better. In the Summer 1942 tournament at maegashira 8, he finally got his first top division kachikoshi and also beat yokozuna Haguroyama for his first gold star or kinboshi. He would continue to plague Haguroyama after this, beating him a total of four times as a maegashira.

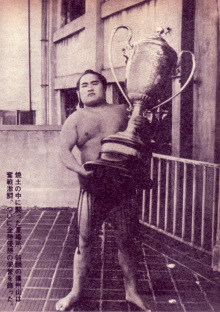
With the Emperor's Cup

In the summer 1945 tournament in the midst of regular allied bombings, Bishūyama had the best tournament of his career. It had been scheduled to be held on the Meiji Shrine grounds in May but had been postponed due to the bombings. The tournament was moved to the Ryōgoku Kokugikan which itself was regularly closed due to the air raids. Under these conditions and with a truncated tournament of only seven days that was closed to the public, Bishūyama, at maegashira 1, took the championship with a perfect 7-0 record. This championship included beating his rival Haguroyama on the first day. This achievement would be his only championship of his career. His accomplishment was not forgotten however. Over ten years later, in a special edition magazine published in 1956, his picture clutching the Emperor's Cup was put on the front page. He was commemorated for his persistent fighting spirit on the dohyō during the turmoil of the allied bombings.

He was promoted to sekiwake the next tournament, but only managed a 5-5 record, and dropped to komusubi for the following Autumn 1946 tournament, the only one held that year. He lost six bouts in a row, and dropped out mid-tournament. He was largely a maegashira wrestler after this. In the Spring 1955 tournament he dropped to the second division jūryō for the first time since entering the top division. At this time, it was the first case of a former top division champion continuing to compete after dropping to jūryō instead of retiring. He lasted one more tournament, the Summer 1955 tournament, but he lost nine bouts in a row and retired mid-tournament.

He stayed in the sumo world as an elder afterwards but died at the young age of forty-two.

== Career record ==
Bishūyama
-	Spring Haru basho, Tokyo	Summer Natsu basho, Tokyo	Autumn Aki basho, Tokyo
1936	(Maezumo)	(Maezumo)	Not held
1937	East Jonokuchi #8; 5–1	East Jonidan #13; 4–3	Not held
1938	West Sandanme #23; 6–1	East Makushita #28; 4–3	Not held
1939	West Makushita #15; 5–2	West Makushita #2; 6–2	Not held
1940	West Jūryō #8; 10–5	East Jūryō #3; 10–5	Not held
1941	West Maegashira #15; 6–9	West Maegashira #13; 6–9	Not held
1942	East Maegashira #9; 7–8	West Maegashira #8; 9–6 ★	Not held
1943	East Maegashira #2; 5–10	West Maegashira #10; 8–7	Not held
1944	East Maegashira #8; 6–9 ★	West Maegashira #9; 5–5	West Maegashira #9; 8–2
1945	Not held	West Maegashira #1; 7–0 ★	West Sekiwake; 5–5
1946	Not held	Not held	East Komusubi; 0–7–6
1947	Not held	West Maegashira #7; 5–5	West Maegashira #3; 5–6
1948	Not held	West Maegashira #5; 2–5–4	West Maegashira #12; 8–3
1949	East Maegashira #4; 6–7 ★	West Maegashira #6; 7–8	East Maegashira #7; 7–8
1950	East Maegashira #8; 10–5	East Maegashira #5; 8–7	East Maegashira #2; 8–7
1951	East Maegashira #1; 3–12	East Maegashira #8; 11–4 ★	West; 6–7–2
1952	West Maegashira #1; 3–12	East Maegashira #8; 6–9	West Maegashira #10; 9–6
Record given as wins–losses–absences Top division champion Top division runner-up Retired Lower divisions Non-participation Sanshō key: F=Fighting spirit; O=Outstanding performance; T=Technique Also shown: ★=Kinboshi; P=Playoff(s); Divisions: Makuuchi — Jūryō — Makushita — Sandanme — Jonidan — Jonokuchi Makuuchi ranks: Yokozuna — Ōzeki — Sekiwake — Komusubi — Maegashira

-	New Year Hatsu basho, Tokyo	Spring Haru basho, Osaka	Summer Natsu basho, Tokyo	Autumn Aki basho, Tokyo
1953	West Maegashira #5; 4–11	East Maegashira #9; 10–5	East Maegashira #5; 2–13	East Maegashira #12; 4–11
1954	West Maegashira #16; 10–5	East Maegashira #11; 7–8	East Maegashira #12; 3–12	West Maegashira #18; 3–12
1955	West Jūryō #5; 3–8–4	East Jūryō #16; Retired; 0–9–6	x	x
Record given as wins–losses–absences Top division champion Top division runner-up Retired Lower divisions Non-participation Sanshō key: F=Fighting spirit; O=Outstanding performance; T=Technique Also shown: ★=Kinboshi; P=Playoff(s); Divisions: Makuuchi — Jūryō — Makushita — Sandanme — Jonidan — Jonokuchi Makuuchi ranks: Yokozuna — Ōzeki — Sekiwake — Komusubi — Maegashira

== See also ==
- Glossary of sumo terms
- List of past sumo wrestlers
- List of sumo tournament top division champions
- List of sekiwake
