= Sadanoyama Shinmatsu =

Japanese sumo wrestler (1938–2017)

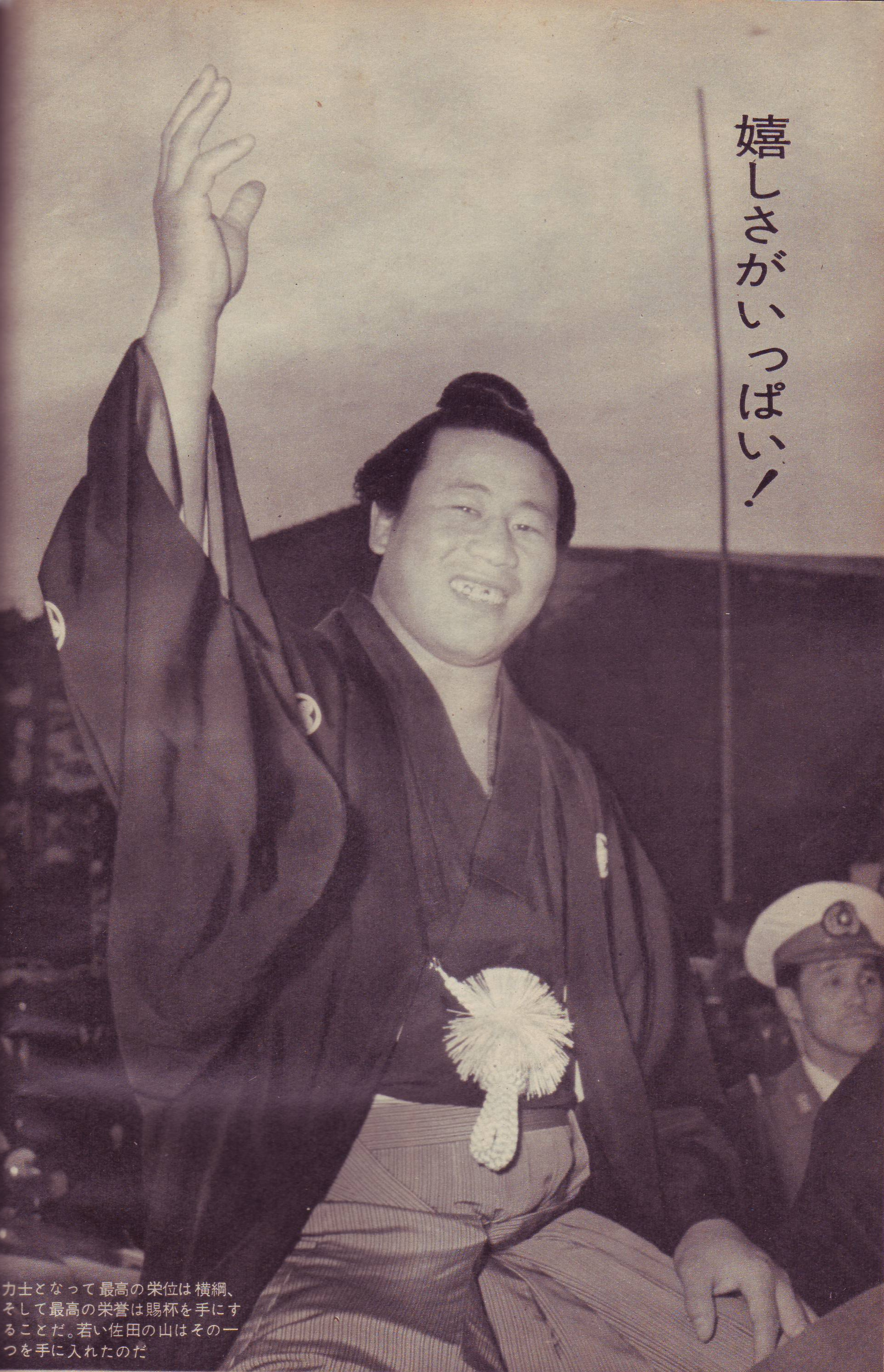
- Sadanoyama celebrates his first tournament victory in May 1961

Personal information
- Born: Shinmatsu Sasada; February 18, 1938 Nagasaki Prefecture, Japan
- Died: April 27, 2017 (aged 79) Tokyo, Japan
- Height: 1.82 m (5 ft 11 1/2 in)
- Weight: 129 kg (284 lb)

Sport
- Sport: Sumo
- Retired: March, 1968
- Heya: Dewanoumi
- Record: 591-251-61
- Debut: January, 1956
- Highest rank: Yokozuna (January, 1965)
- Elder name: Dewanoumi → Sakaigawa
- Championships: 6 (Makuuchi)
- Special Prizes: Fighting Spirit (1); Outstanding Performance (1); Technique (1)
- Gold Stars: 2 (Wakanohana I, Azumafuji)
- Updated on June 2020

Sadanoyama Shinmatsu (Japanese: 佐田の山 晋松; born Shinmatsu Sasada (佐々田 晋松), February 18, 1938 – April 27, 2017) was a Japanese professional sumo wrestler from Nagasaki Prefecture. He was the sport's 50th yokozuna. After his retirement he was the head coach of Dewanoumi stable and served as head of the Japan Sumo Association.

== Career ==
Born in Arikawa, Minamimatsuura District, he made his professional debut in January 1956, and reached sekitori status four years later upon promotion to the jūryō division in March 1960. He made his top makuuchi division debut in January 1961. Sadanoyama won his first tournament title in only his third tournament in the top division, from the rank of maegashira 13. The achievement of winning a tournament from the maegashira ranks is sometimes seen as a jinx on subsequent success in sumo, but Sadanoyama disproved that theory by going on to reach ōzeki in March 1962 after winning his second title, and then yokozuna in January 1965 after capturing his third championship.

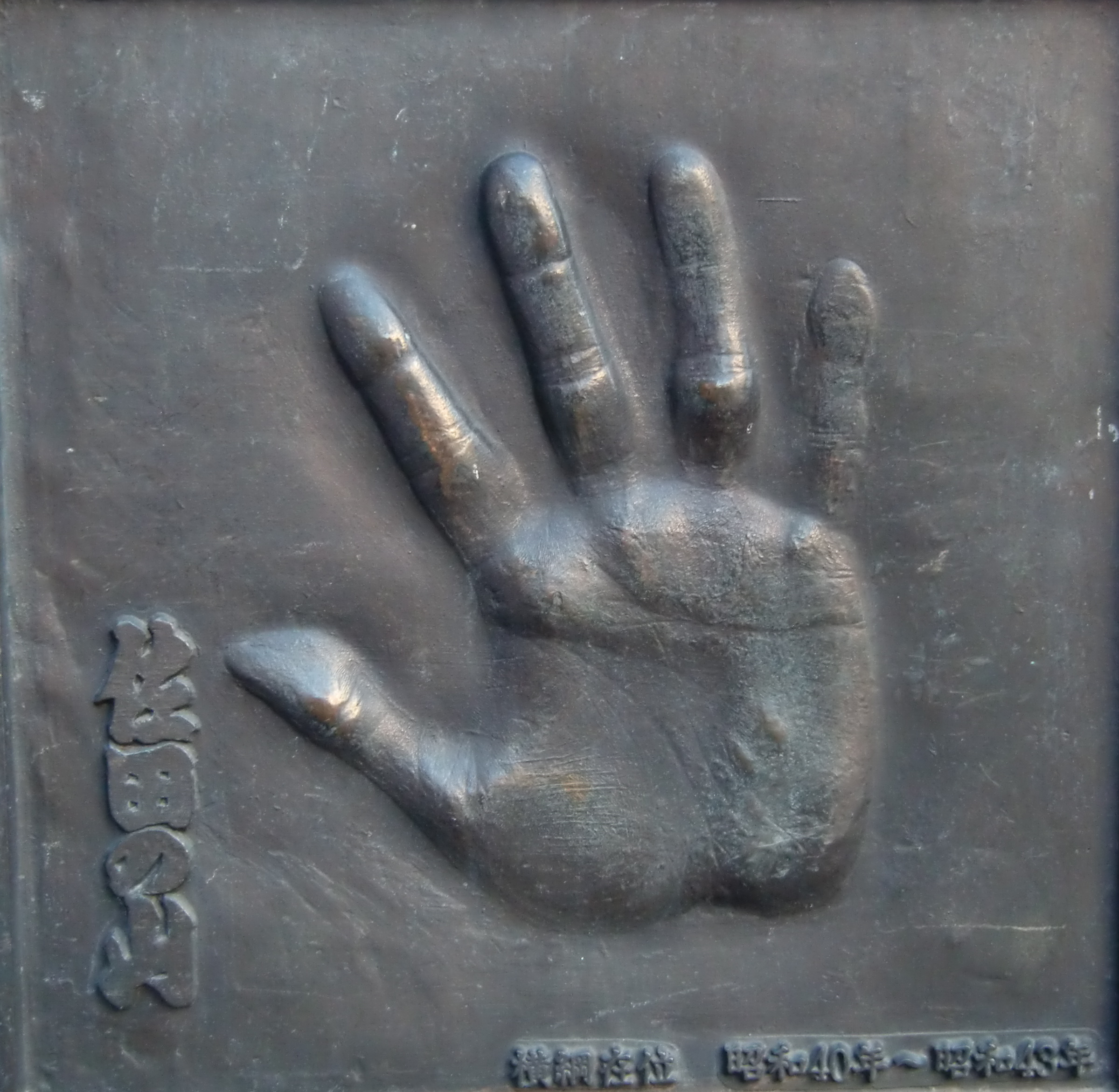
Sadanoyama's handprint on a Ryōgoku monument

He made a cameo appearance in the 1967 James Bond film You Only Live Twice, as himself. Although more attention was focused on yokozuna Taihō and Kashiwado, with their rivalry referred to as the Hakuho era after a combination of their shikona, Sadanoyama in fact ended up winning more tournament championships than Kashiwado.

Sadanoyama announced his retirement suddenly in March 1968, despite having won the previous two tournaments, two days after a surprise loss to a new maegashira, the Hawaiian born Takamiyama. It has been suggested that the shock of losing to a foreigner may have prompted a premature retirement. There is, however, no evidence for this and it is more likely he was continuing the tradition of wrestlers retiring at the peak of their power.

== Retirement from sumo ==
=== Head of the Dewanoumi stable ===
Sadanoyama remained in the sumo world after his retirement, as an elder. Being the son-in-law of Dewanoumi's stable head coach, former maegashira Dewanohana Kuniichi, he inherited Dewanoumi stable. This succession was at the origin of the creation of the Kokonoe stable after Chiyonoyama exclusion from Dewanoumi's ichimon, the latter also wishing to inherit Dewanoumi's kabu

=== Japan sumo association chairmanship ===
In February 1992 he became head of the Japan Sumo Association. He was chosen ahead of his contemporaries Taihō and Kashiwado partly because he was in better health than either of them. As chairman of the association he introduced a certain number of reforms such as the restrictions on foreign wrestlers (in 1992), limited at the time to 40 actives rikishi in total, up to 2 people per heya. In 1995, he also abrogated the tour system, changed from a promotional performance to an association independent performance.

He changed his toshiyori name to Sakaigawa in 1996, handing over the Dewanoumi name and the day-to-day running of his stable to the former Washūyama. The same year he tried to pass a new reform allowing the association to be the sole administrator of kabu to face the rising speculation around the possession of titles. At the time, the titles were either transmitted within a family or bought from the previous owner, the reform aimed to make the kabu the exclusive possession of the association the latter now giving the titles to the people requesting them. The proposition was however met with a refusal from the board of the association.

He did not run for re-election in 1998, after it became clear he lacked enough support due to his failed reform. He was then succeeded by former ōzeki Yutakayama from the rival Tokitsukaze faction. Remaining on the board, he subsequently became head of the judging department, an unusual move for a former head of the Sumo Association. Sadanoyama declined his right of doing a Kanreki dohyō-iri after receiving his red tsuna, in the form of taking responsibility for the turmoil during his time as a chairman. He stood down as an elder in 2003 upon reaching the mandatory retirement age of sixty five and gave the kabu of Sakaigawa to his former trainee Ryōgoku.

== Death ==
He died in a Tokyo hospital of pneumonia on April 27, 2017, at the age of 79. At the time of his death he was the oldest yokozuna since the passing of Wakanohana in 2010. Following his will, the funerals were held in a strict family circle.

== Fighting style ==
Sadanoyama was known for employing pushing and thrusting techniques such as tsuppari (a series of rapid thrusts to the chest) and regularly won by such kimarite as oshi dashi (push out) and tsuki dashi (thrust out). However he was also good on the mawashi where he preferred a migi-yotsu (left hand outside, right hand inside) grip, and often won by yori kiri (force out) and uwatenage (overarm throw).

== Career record ==
- The Kyushu tournament was first held in 1957, and the Nagoya tournament in 1958.

Sadanoyama Shinmatsu
Year	January Hatsu basho, Tokyo	March Haru basho, Osaka	May Natsu basho, Tokyo	July Nagoya basho, Nagoya	September Aki basho, Tokyo	November Kyūshū basho, Fukuoka
1956	(Maezumo)	West Jonokuchi #10; 5–3	East Jonidan #88; 6–2	Not held	West Jonidan #34; 7–1	Not held
1957	East Sandanme #85; 4–4	East Sandanme #82; 4–4	East Sandanme #72; 5–3	Not held	West Sandanme #42; 7–1	East Sandanme #13; 5–3
1958	West Sandanme #3; 5–3	West Makushita #72; 5–3	East Makushita #66; 5–3	East Makushita #56; 6–2	East Makushita #43; 5–3	West Makushita #32; 4–4
1959	West Makushita #31; 5–3	East Makushita #28; 5–3	West Makushita #23; 6–2	West Makushita #10; 5–3	East Makushita #9; 4–4	West Makushita #6; 5–3
1960	West Makushita #4; 6–2	East Jūryō #16; 11–4	West Jūryō #9; 10–5	West Jūryō #3; 7–8	West Jūryō #4; 8–7	East Jūryō #2; 11–4
1961	East Maegashira #12; 10–5	West Maegashira #4; Sat out due to injury 0–0–15	West Maegashira #13; 12–3; F	East Maegashira #2; 11–4; O★★	East Sekiwake #2; 8–7	East Sekiwake #2; 8–7
1962	West Sekiwake #1; 9–6	East Sekiwake #2; 13–2–P; T	West Ōzeki #1; 13–2	East Ōzeki #1; 9–6	East Ōzeki #2; 13–2–P	East Ōzeki #1; 11–4
1963	East Ōzeki #1; 12–3	East Ōzeki #1; 0–5–10	East Ōzeki #3; 11–4	West Ōzeki #1; 13–2–P	East Ōzeki #1; 10–5	East Ōzeki #2; 8–7
1964	East Ōzeki #2; 9–3–3	East Ōzeki #1; 9–6	East Ōzeki #2; 11–4	West Ōzeki #1; 8–7	West Ōzeki #2; 13–2	East Ōzeki #1; 13–2
1965	East Ōzeki #1; 13–2	West Yokozuna #1; 12–3	West Yokozuna #1; 14–1	East Yokozuna #1; 12–3	West Yokozuna #1; 12–3–P	East Yokozuna #1; 11–4
1966	West Yokozuna #1; 5–6–4	West Yokozuna #1; 5–5–5	West Yokozuna #2; Sat out due to injury 0–0–15	West Yokozuna #2; 11–4	East Yokozuna #2; 12–3	East Yokozuna #2; 10–5
1967	East Yokozuna #2; 14–1	West Yokozuna #1; 9–6	East Yokozuna #2; 12–3	East Yokozuna #2; 10–5	West Yokozuna #1; 12–3	West Yokozuna #1; 12–3
1968	East Yokozuna #1; 13–2	East Yokozuna #1; Retired; 2–4	x	x	x	x
Record given as wins–losses–absences Top division champion Top division runner-up Retired Lower divisions Non-participation Sanshō key: F=Fighting spirit; O=Outstanding performance; T=Technique Also shown: ★=Kinboshi; P=Playoff(s); Divisions: Makuuchi — Jūryō — Makushita — Sandanme — Jonidan — Jonokuchi Makuuchi ranks: Yokozuna — Ōzeki — Sekiwake — Komusubi — Maegashira

== See also ==
- Glossary of sumo terms
- List of sumo tournament top division champions
- List of sumo tournament top division runners-up
- List of past sumo wrestlers
- List of yokozuna

Preceded by Tochinoumi Teruyoshi	50th Yokozuna; 1965–1968	Succeeded by Tamanoumi Masahiro
Yokozuna is not a successive rank, and more than one wrestler can hold the title at once

Sporting positions
Preceded by Wakanohana Kanji I	Chairman of the Japan Sumo Association; 1992–1998	Succeeded by Yutakayama Katsuo
