= Tochinoumi Teruyoshi =

Japanese sumo wrestler (1938–2021)

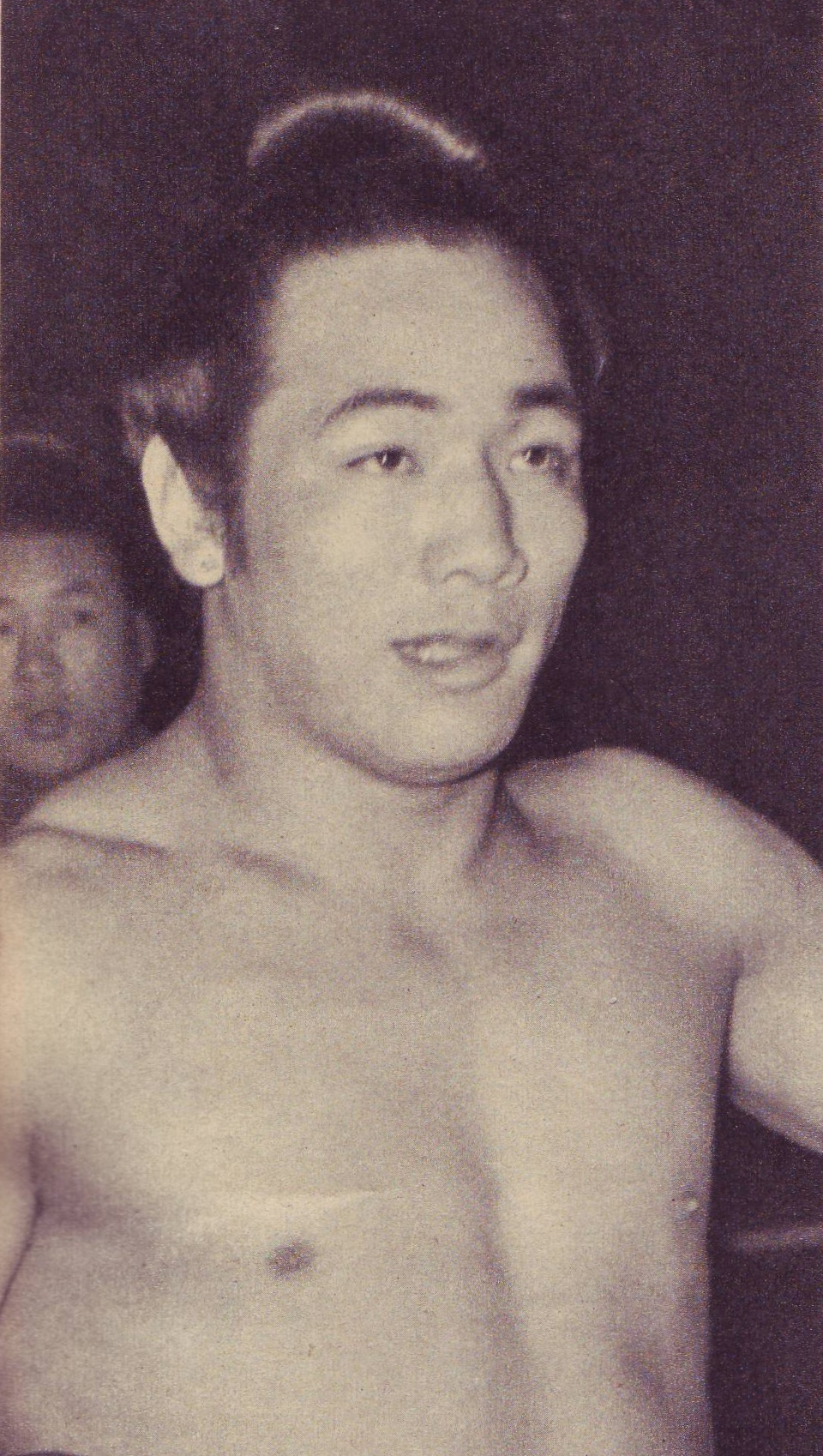
- Tochinoumi, 1959

Personal information
- Native name: 栃ノ海 晃嘉
- Born: Shigehiro Hanada; March 13, 1938 Aomori, Japan
- Died: January 29, 2021 (aged 82)
- Height: 1.77 m (5 ft 9 1/2 in)
- Weight: 110 kg (243 lb)

Sport
- Sport: Sumo
- Retired: November 1966
- Heya: Kasugano
- Record: 475-261-104
- Debut: September 1955
- Highest rank: Yokozuna (January, 1964)
- Elder name: Takenawa
- Championships: 3 (Makuuchi); 1 (Jūryō); 1 (Makushita)
- Special Prizes: Fighting Spirit (1); Technique (6)
- Gold Stars: (1) asashio
- Updated on January 2021

Tochinoumi Teruyoshi (Japanese: 栃ノ海 晃嘉; born Shigehiro Hanada (花田 茂廣, Hanada Shigehiro); 13 March 1938 – 29 January 2021) was a Japanese professional sumo wrestler from Aomori. He was the sport's 49th yokozuna, earning promotion in 1964. He was somewhat overshadowed by his yokozuna contemporaries Taihō and Kashiwado, but he was a noted technician and earlier in his career won six special prizes for Technique. He was one of the lightest yokozuna ever at just 110 kg. After his retirement from active competition in 1966 he was a coach at Kasugano stable, and was head coach from 1990 until his retirement in 2003.

== Career ==
Born in Inakadate, Minamitsugaru District, he made his professional debut in September 1955. He joined Kasugano stable, a prestigious stable that had previously produced yokozuna Tochigiyama and Tochinishiki. He initially fought under his birth name Hanada Shigehiro, changing the spelling of Shigehiro numerous times. In March 1957 he won the forth-division championship in a rare eight-way playoff. After about three years in the lower ranks he reached the second jūryō division in January 1959 and was promoted to the top makuuchi division in March 1960. After two make-koshi or losing scores he was demoted to jūryō but immediately won the second division championship with a 14–1 record and was promoted back. He then adopted the shikona Tochinoumi Teruyoshi in September 1960.

He captured his first top division tournament championship in May 1962 at sekiwake rank and was promoted to ōzeki, alongside his stablemate Tochihikari. He won his second championship in November 1963 and followed up with a 13–2 record in January 1964. Although he only took third place in this tournament, behind Taihō on 15–0 and maegashira Kiyokuni on 14–1, he was promoted to sumo's highest rank of yokozuna, despite some doubts about his lack of weight. He was only able to win one further championship, in May 1964, and being severely restricted by a herniated disc in his lower back, posted a succession of bare majority 8–7 records in 1965. He recovered somewhat to post a 10–5 in September 1965, but then suffered a serious injury to a muscle in his right arm. He had expressed hope that he could fight until the age of 30, but after an injury-plagued 1966 he retired at the end of the year at the age of 28 years eight months, making him the youngest retired yokozuna ever. He often seemed to feel under pressure as a yokozuna, suffering from weight loss and lack of sleep. His winning percentage at the rank was just .596 (the worst ever after Maedayama and Mienoumi) with 102 wins and 69 losses (plus 84 absences). He gave away 33 kinboshi, 36 percent of all his yokozuna matches against maegashira. His overall makuuchi record was .635, with 310 wins, 184 losses and 104 absences.

== Fighting style ==
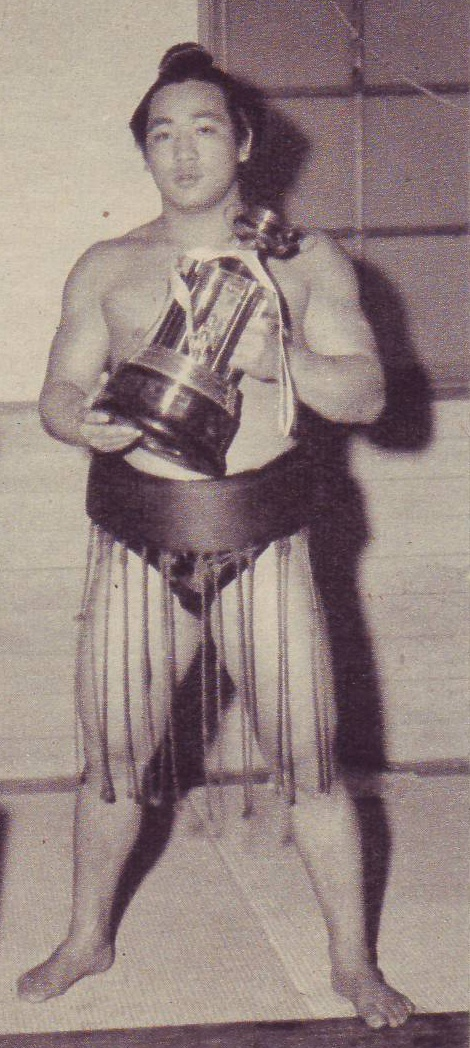
Tochinoumi in 1961 with the Technique Prize, one of six he was to win in his career.

Tochinoumi was noted for his technical skill, and six of his seven special prizes were for Technique. His most common winning kimarite were yorikiri (force out) and yoritaoshi (force out and down), but he also had more unusual techniques in his repertoire, such as kirikaeshi (twisting backward knee trip) and sotogake (outer leg trip).

== Retirement from sumo ==
Tochinoumi stayed in the sumo world as an elder of the Sumo Association, under the name Nakadachi. Somewhat unusually for a former yokozuna, he did not immediately take charge of a stable, instead working as an assistant coach. However, in January 1990 he did become head coach of Kasugano stable after the death of the previous stablemaster, the former Tochinishiki. Among the sekitori he produced were Tochinonada, Tochinohana, Tochisakae, and Kasuganishiki. He later expressed satisfaction that he had managed to maintain the tradition of an unbroken string of sekitori at Kasugano stable dating back to before the second World War. He stood down in 2003 upon reaching the mandatory retirement age of 65, handing control of the stable over to former sekiwake Tochinowaka. He was one month younger than Sadanoyama, who was promoted to yokozuna a year after him. Following the death of Sadanoyama in April 2017, he was the oldest living yokozuna, but he remained active by playing golf. In 2018 he visited Kasugano stable and participated in the ceremony to mark Tochinoshin's promotion to ōzeki. In 2019 he organized the Tochinoumi Cup, a sumo tournament for children, in his home village of Inakadate, Aomori. He died in January 2021 of aspiration pneumonia at the age of 82. He was the second longest living yokozuna of all-time, after Umegatani I.

== Personal life ==
His first marriage ended in divorce. His second wife was, like his first, from the world of show business as she was a former member of the Takarazuka Revue troupe. His son Yasuyuki, born in 1970, also became a sumo wrestler at Kasugano stable, joining in March 1986 but retiring in 1991 having failed to progress further than the jonidan division.

== Career record ==
- The Kyushu tournament was first held in 1957, and the Nagoya tournament in 1958.

Tochinoumi Teruyoshi
Year	January Hatsu basho, Tokyo	March Haru basho, Osaka	May Natsu basho, Tokyo	July Nagoya basho, Nagoya	September Aki basho, Tokyo	November Kyūshū basho, Fukuoka
1955	x	x	x	x	Shinjo; 3–0	Not held
1956	West Jonidan #83; 5–3	West Jonidan #46; 5–3	East Jonidan #22; 6–2	Not held	West Sandanme #87; 6–2	Not held
1957	West Sandanme #60; 6–2	East Sandanme #37; 7–1–PPP	East Makushita #81; 4–4	Not held	West Makushita #80; 5–3	East Makushita #64; 7–1
1958	East Makushita #51; 3–5	East Makushita #54; 6–2	West Makushita #41; 4–4	East Makushita #40; 8–0; Champion	West Makushita #6; 4–4	West Makushita #5; 7–1
1959	West Jūryō #23; 9–6	East Jūryō #21; 8–7	West Jūryō #16; 10–5	West Jūryō #8; 9–6	West Jūryō #5; 9–6	East Jūryō #4; 10–5
1960	East Jūryō #1; 8–7	West Maegashira #15; 7–8	East Maegashira #17; 5–10	East Jūryō #5; 14–1; Champion	East Maegashira #14; 10–5	East Maegashira #8; 11–4; T
1961	East Maegashira #2; Sat out due to injury 0–0–15	East Maegashira #11; 9–6	East Maegashira #5; 10–5; T★	East Komusubi #1; 11–4; T	East Sekiwake #1; 8–7	East Sekiwake #1; 9–6; T
1962	East Sekiwake #1; 9–6; T	West Sekiwake #1; 9–6	West Sekiwake #1; 14–1; TF	East Ōzeki #2; 9–6	East Ōzeki #3; 10–5	West Ōzeki #2; 9–6
1963	East Ōzeki #2; 9–6	West Ōzeki #2; 8–2–5	West Ōzeki #1; 10–5	East Ōzeki #2; 8–7	East Ōzeki #3; 11–4	West Ōzeki #1; 14–1
1964	East Ōzeki #1; 13–2	East Yokozuna #2; 10–5	East Yokozuna #2; 13–2	East Yokozuna #1; 11–4	East Yokozuna #1; 9–6	West Yokozuna #1; 0–3–12
1965	East Yokozuna #2; 8–7	East Yokozuna #2; 8–7	East Yokozuna #2; 8–7	West Yokozuna #2; 7–4–4	West Yokozuna #2; 10–5	West Yokozuna #2; 5–6–4
1966	East Yokozuna #2; Sat out due to injury 0–0–15	West Yokozuna #2; 10–5	East Yokozuna #2; 1–3–11	East Yokozuna #2; Sat out due to injury 0–0–15	West Yokozuna #2; Sat out due to injury 0–0–15	West Yokozuna #2; Retired; 2–5–8
Record given as wins–losses–absences Top division champion Top division runner-up Retired Lower divisions Non-participation Sanshō key: F=Fighting spirit; O=Outstanding performance; T=Technique Also shown: ★=Kinboshi; P=Playoff(s); Divisions: Makuuchi — Jūryō — Makushita — Sandanme — Jonidan — Jonokuchi Makuuchi ranks: Yokozuna — Ōzeki — Sekiwake — Komusubi — Maegashira

== See also ==
- Glossary of sumo terms
- List of sumo tournament top division champions
- List of sumo tournament second division champions
- List of past sumo wrestlers
- List of yokozuna

Preceded by Taihō Kōki	49th Yokozuna; 1964–1966	Succeeded by Sadanoyama Shinmatsu
Yokozuna is not a successive rank, and more than one wrestler can hold the title at once
