= Asashio Tarō =

Asashio Tarō may refer to:

- Asashio Tarō I (1864-1920), Japanese sumo wrestler; ozeki, real name Tarokichi Masuhara
- Asashio Tarō II (1879-1961), Japanese sumo wrestler; ozeki and 3rd Takasago-oyakata, real name Chokichi Komota
- Asashio Tarō III (1929-1988), Japanese sumo wrestler; 46th yokozuna and 5th Takasago-oyakata
- Asashio Tarō IV (1955-2023), Japanese sumo wrestler; ozeki and 7th Takasago-oyakata
