= Kanreki dohyō-iri =

Sumo ceremony

Tochinishiki performs his kanreki dohyo-iri accompanied by Wakanohana and Sadanoyama (c. 1985).

In sumo wrestling, a kanreki dohyō-iri (Japanese: 還暦土俵入り) is a ring-entering ceremony (dohyō-iri) performed by a former yokozuna in celebration of his 60th birthday (called kanreki in Japanese). If he is a toshiyori (a sumo elder), the ceremony is usually held at the Ryōgoku Kokugikan, the main sumo hall in Tokyo. Those who are not current members of the Japan Sumo Association must hold it at another location. A special red tsuna is created and worn, instead of the usual white tsuna. Reaching your 60th birthday is an important occasion in Japan and is celebrated by wearing a red item. This is commonly known as an akatsuna (赤綱) but this term is unofficial. If the dew-sweeper or sword-bearer is a former yokozuna, he wears his own tsuna.

== History ==
The first kanreki dohyō-iri was originally held to celebrate the achievements of legendary yokozuna Tachiyama, who had recorded just three defeats since his promotion to the supreme title of yokozuna, on the occasion of his sixtieth anniversary. The ceremony took place at the Ueno Seiyōken, a renowned French cuisine restaurant in Tsukiji (Chūō, Tokyo). The Tachiyama-kai (太刀山会), the yokozuna's supporters association (koenkai) when he was still active, organized a 300-cover banquet for the event, attended by, among others, Tōyama Mitsuru and Saigō Jūtoku, two influential members of the nobility to whom the Japan Sumo Association owed much of its influence.

== Kanreki performed at Kokugikan ==
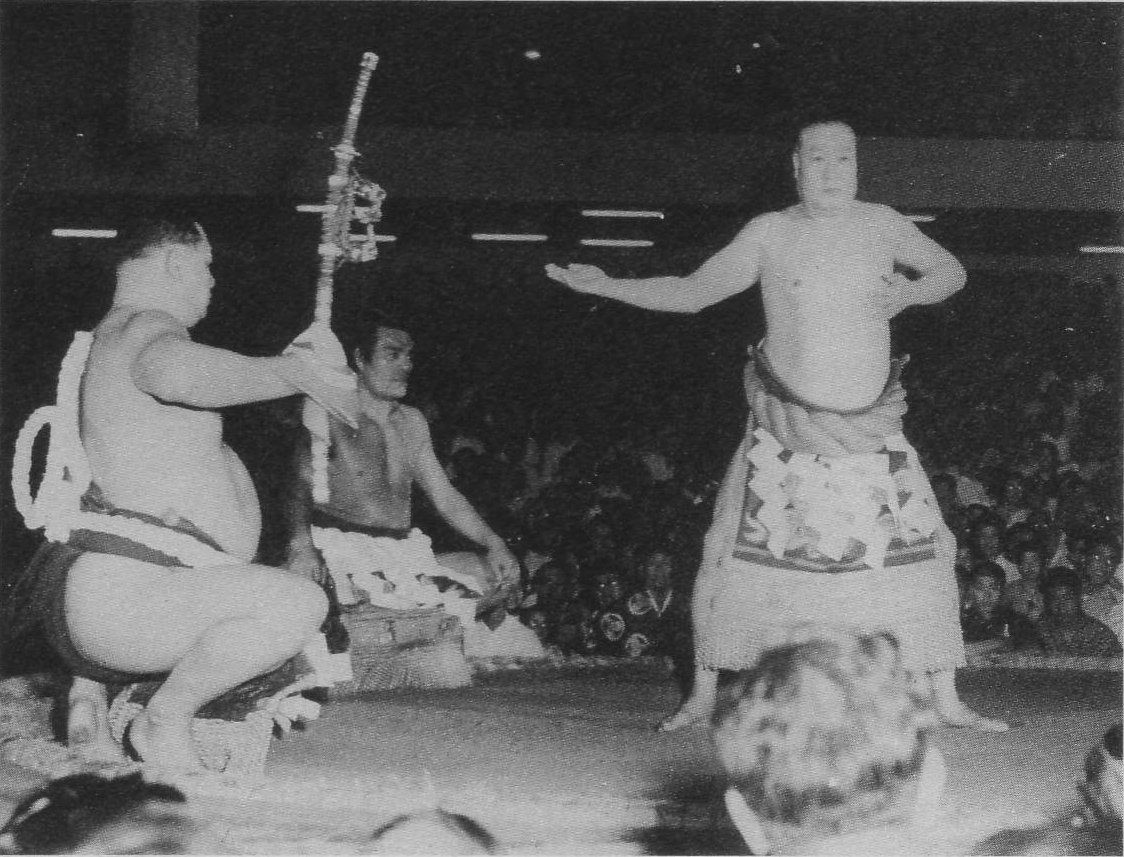
Tsunenohana's kanreki dohyo-iri in 1956

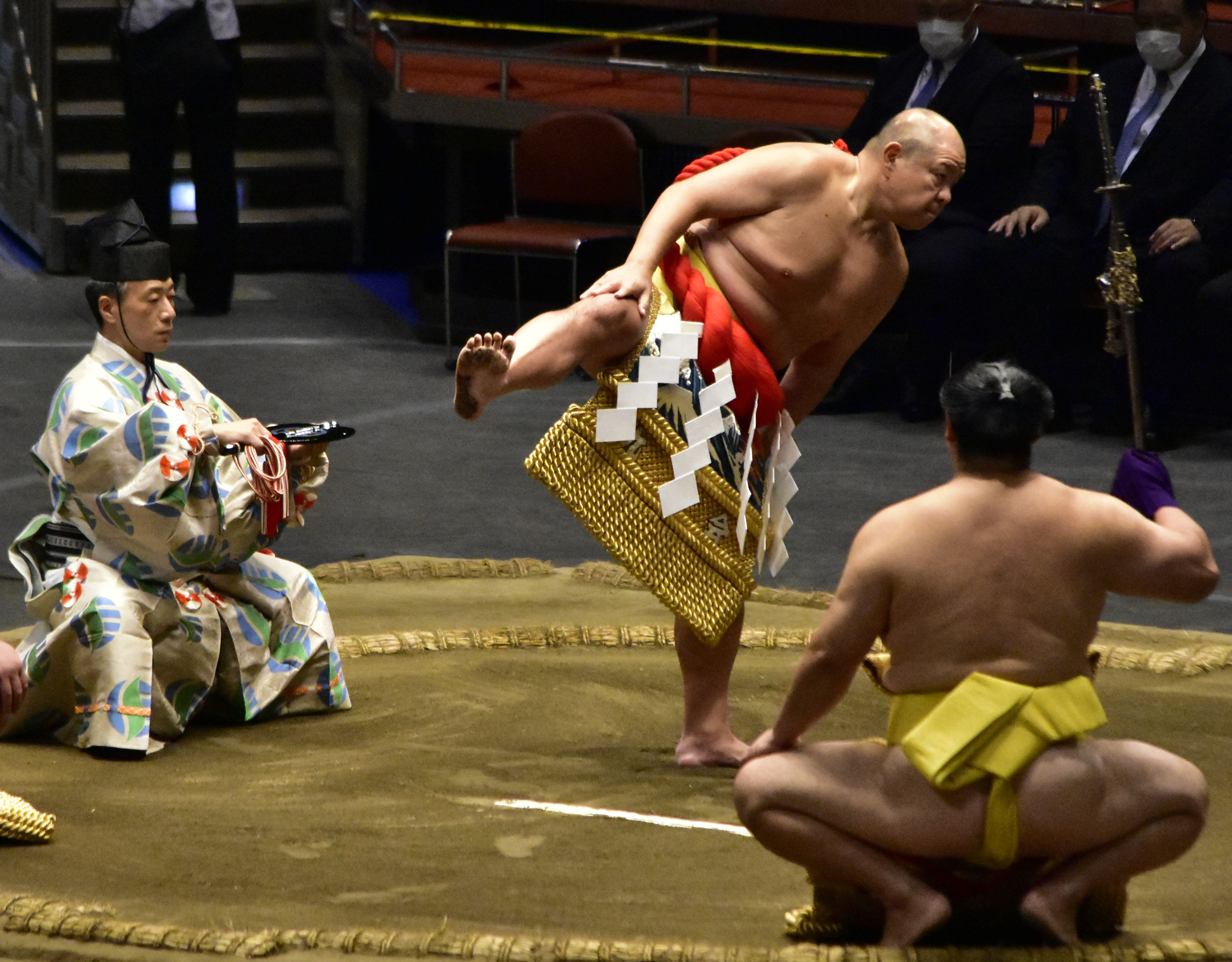
Former yokozuna Hokutoumi (current JSA chairman Hakkaku) performing his kanreki dohyō-iri in 2023

Wrestlers are listed using their ring name, followed by their then toshiyori name in brackets if they were retired at the time of the ceremony.

Year	Wrestler	Dew-sweeper	Sword-bearer
1952	Tochigiyama Moriya (Kasugano)	Akinoumi Setsuo (Fujishima)	Haguroyama Masaji (active)
1956	Tsunenohana Kan'ichi (Dewanoumi)	Chiyonoyama Masanobu (active)	Futabayama Sadaji (Tokitsukaze)
1985	Tochinishiki Kiyotaka (Kasugano)	Sadanoyama Shinmatsu (Dewanoumi)	Wakanohana Kanji I (Futagoyama)
1988	Wakanohana Kanji I (Futagoyama)	Takanosato Toshihide (Naruto)	Wakanohana Kanji II (Magaki)
2000	Taihō Kōki (special toshiyori)	Chiyonofuji Mitsugu (Kokonoe)	Kitanoumi Toshimitsu (special toshiyori)
2013	Kitanoumi Toshimitsu (special toshiyori)	Takanohana Kōji (special toshiyori)	Chiyonofuji Mitsugu (Kokonoe)
2015	Chiyonofuji Mitsugu (Kokonoe)	Harumafuji Kōhei (active)	Hakuhō Shō (active)
2021	Asahifuji Seiya (Isegahama)	Aminishiki Ryūji (Ajigawa)	Harumafuji Kōhei (No longer in Sumo Association)
2023	Hokutoumi Nobuyoshi (Hakkaku)	Hokutofuji Daiki (active)	Okinoumi Ayumi (Kimigahama)

== Kanreki performed at other locations ==
Year	Wrestler	Dew-sweeper	Sword-bearer	Venue
1937	Tachiyama Mineemon	Tachienoumi Namiemon (Kise)	Tachihikari Den'emon (Naruto)	Ueno Seiyōken
2002	Kitanofuji Katsuaki	Hokutoumi Nobuyoshi (Hakkaku)	Chiyonofuji Mitsugu (Kokonoe)	Hakkaku stable and Hotel East 21
2007	Mienoumi Tsuyoshi (Musashigawa)	Miyabiyama Tetsushi (active)	Dejima Takeharu (active)	Hotel Grand Pacific Meridian

Tachiyama's was the first kanreki-dohyo-iri and the only one to use the shiranui style until Asahifuji's in 2021. Mienoumi performed an early kanreki dohyō-iri seven months before his 60th birthday, on the 25th anniversary of the founding of Musashigawa stable.

== Other eligible Yokozuna ==
Minanogawa Tōzō, Akinoumi Setsuo and Hiroshi Wajima also reached the age of sixty years whilst retired, but did not perform a kanreki dohyō-iri (all three had left the sumo world many years before). Kagamisato Kiyoji (Tatsutagawa), Tochinoumi Teruyoshi (Kasugano), Sadanoyama Shinmatsu (Sakaigawa) and Kotozakura Masakatsu (Sadogatake) received red tsuna but did not perform dohyō-iri. Kagamisato and Kotozakura did not perform due to poor health. Similarly Tochinoumi did not perform due to muscle problems in his right arm dating back to his active days. Sadanoyama declined because at the time he had just lost the chairmanship of the Sumo Association in controversial circumstances. Asashio Tarō (Takasago) had a red tsuna made, but died aged 58 without performing the ceremony.

Asahifuji was scheduled to perform the kanreki ceremony on 30 May 2020 but the event was postponed owing to the COVID-19 pandemic. It was eventually held on 3 October 2021 at the Kokugikan.

Ōnokuni Yasushi reached 60 years of age in October 2022, however, no plans for a dohyō-iri were reported.

== See also ==
- List of yokozuna
