= Tachihikari Denemon =

Japanese sumo wrestler

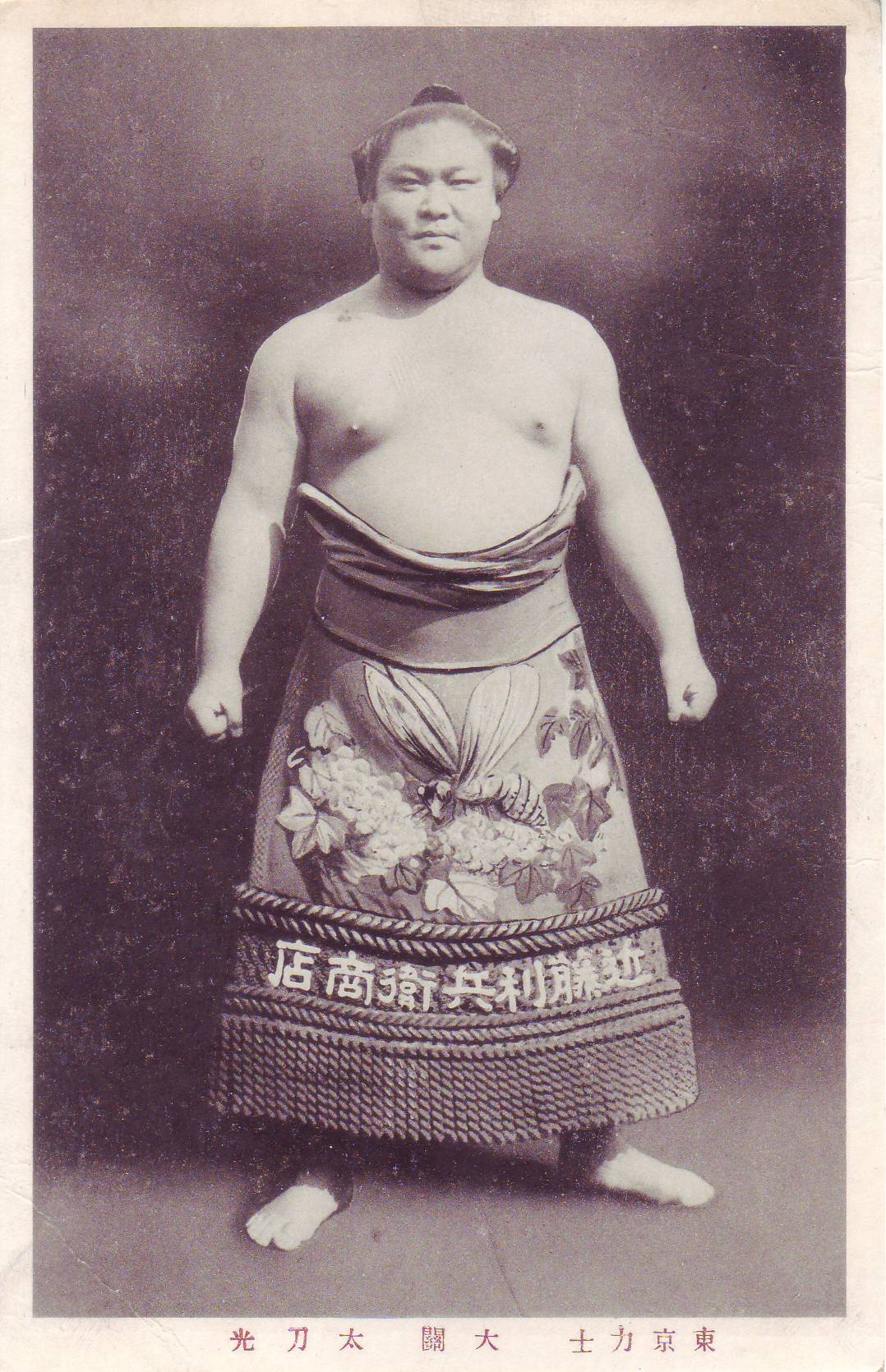
- Postcard featuring Tachihikari

Personal information
- Native name: 太刀光 電右エ門
- Born: Masaharu Hatta; 29 March 1897 Mikasa, Hokkaido
- Died: 15 May 1952 (aged 55)
- Height: 1.70 m (5 ft 7 in)
- Weight: 113 kg (249 lb)

Sport
- Sport: Sumo
- Retired: October 1927
- Heya: Tomozuna → Takasago
- Record: 114-53-71-8 draws-6 holds
- Debut: January 1913
- Highest rank: Ōzeki (May 1923)
- Elder name: Naruto
- Gold Stars: 1 (Ōnishiki)

Tachihikari Denemon (Japanese: 太刀光 電右エ門; 29 March 1897 – 15 May 1952) was a Japanese professional sumo wrestler from Mikasa, Hokkaido. His highest rank was ōzeki. He was a member of the Tomozuna and Takasago stable. After retiring in 1927 he was an elder of the Japan Sumo Association under the name of Naruto (鳴戸).

== Career ==
He was born Masaharu Hatta (八田 政次) in Mikasa, Sorachi District, Hokkaido, the second son of a miner. In the summer of 1912 in Sapporo he met yokozuna Tachiyama, who recruited him to Tomozuna stable. He made his professional debut in January 1913. Despite his short height he was extremely flexible, able to throw his opponents with both his right hand grip and left hand grip. He was transferred to Takasago stable in May 1919 when his stablemaster Tachiyama (by then going by the elder name Azumazeki) abruptly quit the sumo world. He was diligent about training and reached the top makuuchi division in January 1921. In May 1922 he won his first (and only) kinboshi by defeating Ōnishiki Uichirō, who had not lost a bout in two years and had also defeated Tachiyama in the latter's last ever bout in January 1917. This in fact turned out to be Ōnishiki's last bout as well, as he quit sumo in the wake of the strike against the Tokyo Sumo Association known as the Mikawajima-Incident. Following this performance Tachihikari was promoted to sekiwake in January 1923 and to ōzeki in May 1923, ahead of the more favoured Kuragatake. He was the first ōzeki of the newly established Japan Sumo Association, formed from a merger of the Tokyo and Osaka associations. Although he did not win any championships at the ōzeki rank he continued to have good results until he hurt his right leg in a match against Dewagatake in May 1926. In the four tournaments following that injury he only took part in three bouts, and he finally retired in October 1927 having lost his ōzeki rank.

== Retirement from sumo ==
He became a toshiyori or elder of the Japan Sumo Association under the name Naruto Oyakata, affiliated to Takasago stable. In 1937 he took part the kanreki dohyo-iri ceremony to mark Tachiyama's 60th birthday, in the role of sword-bearer. In May 1951 he quit the Sumo Association following disagreements with Takasago's stablemaster, ex-Maedayama, that saw him transfer briefly to Tatsunami stable. He returned to his hometown to start full-time operations of a restaurant that he had begun in Otaru. He died in May 1952 at the age of 55. His shikona was subsequently used by two other sekitori, Tachihikari Akihiro, a university graduate who was in jūryō in 1970, and Tachihikari Denemon II, a maegashira in the 1990s.

== Career record ==
Tachihikari Denemon
-	Spring	Summer
1913	(Maezumo)	West Jonokuchi #40; 3–1–1hold
1914	East Jonidan #63; 2–3	East Jonidan #54; 2–3
1915	East Jonidan #52; 3–2	West Jonidan #15; 3–2
1916	West Sandanme #63; 3–1–1draw	West Sandanme #32; 3–1–1hold
1917	East Makushita #56; 3–1–1hold	West Makushita #27; 2–1
1918	West Makushita #18; 4–1	East Jūryō #11; 3–1
1919	West Jūryō #1; 3–3–1hold	East Jūryō #5; 3–2
1920	East Jūryō #2; 4–3	East Jūryō #2; 6–2–1draw
1921	East Maegashira #18; 7–2–1	West Maegashira #6; 4–5–1draw
1922	West Maegashira #8; 7–2–1draw	East Maegashira #1; 7–2–1draw
1923	West Sekiwake; 7–1–1–1draw	East Ōzeki; 7–1–2–1hold
1924	East Ōzeki; 0–0–10	West Ōzeki; 7–1–2draws–1hold
1925	West Ōzeki; 3–2–6	East Ōzeki; 7–4
1926	East Ōzeki; 7–3–1	West Ōzeki; 2–2–7
Record given as wins–losses–absences Top division champion Top division runner-up Retired Lower divisions Non-participation Sanshō key: F=Fighting spirit; O=Outstanding performance; T=Technique Also shown: ★=Kinboshi; P=Playoff(s); Divisions: Makuuchi — Jūryō — Makushita — Sandanme — Jonidan — Jonokuchi Makuuchi ranks: Yokozuna — Ōzeki — Sekiwake — Komusubi — Maegashira

-	Spring Haru basho, Tokyo	March Sangatsu basho, varied	Summer Natsu basho, Tokyo	October Jūgatsu basho, varied
1927	East Ōzeki #2; 0–0–11	East Ōzeki #2; 2–1–8	East Sekiwake; 0–0–11	West Sekiwake; Retired; 0–0–11
Record given as wins–losses–absences Top division champion Top division runner-up Retired Lower divisions Non-participation Sanshō key: F=Fighting spirit; O=Outstanding performance; T=Technique Also shown: ★=Kinboshi; P=Playoff(s); Divisions: Makuuchi — Jūryō — Makushita — Sandanme — Jonidan — Jonokuchi Makuuchi ranks: Yokozuna — Ōzeki — Sekiwake — Komusubi — Maegashira

== See also ==
- Glossary of sumo terms
- List of ōzeki
