= Asabenkei Daikichi =

Japanese sumo wrestler

Asabenkei Daikichi 朝弁慶 大吉
Personal information
- Born: Yasunobu Sakai 酒井泰伸; 12 February 1989 (age 37) Kanagawa, Japan
- Height: 190.1 cm (74.8 in)
- Weight: 188 kg (414 lb)

Sport
- Sport: Sumo
- Retired: July 2024
- Heya: Takasago stable
- Record: 347-314-21
- Debut: March 2007
- Highest rank: Juryo 7
- Championships: 1 (Sandanme)
- Updated on 1 November 2023

Asabenkei Daikichi (Japanese 朝弁慶 大吉, born February 12, 1989, as Yasunobu Sakai) is a Japanese retired sumo wrestler (rikishi) from Kanagawa. He debuted in March 2007 and he reached his highest rank of juryo 7 in July 2016. He wrestled for Takasago stable and has won one yusho in the sandanme division. He retired in July 2024.

== Early life ==
Born in Hiratsuka, his parents owned a Chinese restaurant, the rival of which was called Benkei from which he derived his shikona. He belonged to his high school's judo club and as he approached graduation he was 190cm tall. After he graduated high school in 2007 he joined Takasago stable.

== Career ==
His initial shikona was Asasakai Yasunobu from March 2007 to March 2009, and from May 2009 he wrestled as Asabenkei Keisei, however he changed his personal name another three times until January 2013 where he returned his shikona to Asabenkei Keisei.

He was first promoted to juryo in November 2015, after over eight years in sumo. At the time, the 34-year-old Asasekiryu was Takasago stable's only sekitori, and Asabenkei spoke of his desire to keep the stable's streak of always having sekitori since 1878 going. At a press conference his head coach Takasago, the former ozeki Asashio Tarō IV said, "I want him to become strong like Benkei." He was the first wrestler from Kanagawa Prefecture to reach juryo since Asanosho 22 years earlier. In his juryo debut he posted a 6–9 record. After six straight tournaments in juryo he lost sekitori status after the November 2016 tournament. In May 2018 he returned to juryo for the first time in nine tournaments, but he tore his meniscus during the tournament and withdrew on the 13th day with a 3–10 record, his first injury absence since May 2011. The injury required an operation and forced him to sit out two consecutive tournaments. Upon his return from kyujo in November 2018, he had fallen from juryo 12 back down to sandanme 25. That tournament he posted a 4–3 record, however, the next tournament in January 2019, he claimed the sandanme yusho with a perfect record of 7-0, or a zensho-yusho.

He once again returned to juryo in July 2020 where he had a losing record of 3-12 which sent him back to makushita. He retired in July 2024.

== Fighting style ==
Asabenkei is an oshi style wrestler with the majority of his wins coming via yorikiri or oshidashi.

== Career record ==
Asabenkei Daikichi
Year	January Hatsu basho, Tokyo	March Haru basho, Osaka	May Natsu basho, Tokyo	July Nagoya basho, Nagoya	September Aki basho, Tokyo	November Kyūshū basho, Fukuoka
2007	x	(Maezumo)	West Jonokuchi #26; 3–4	West Jonokuchi #19; 5–2	West Jonidan #101; 4–3	East Jonidan #76; 5–2
2008	West Jonidan #34; 4–3	West Jonidan #9; 2–5	East Jonidan #38; 4–3	East Jonidan #15; 5–2	East Sandanme #84; 2–5	West Jonidan #6; 3–4
2009	East Jonidan #31; 4–3	East Jonidan #10; 4–3	West Sandanme #89; 6–1	East Sandanme #33; 4–3	West Sandanme #20; 1–6	East Sandanme #54; 4–3
2010	West Sandanme #39; 3–4	West Sandanme #53; 3–4	East Sandanme #66; 5–2	West Sandanme #39; 4–3	West Sandanme #21; 6–1	East Makushita #40; 1–6
2011	West Sandanme #16; 5–2	Tournament Cancelled; 0–0–0	East Makushita #54; Sat out due to injury 0–1–6	East Sandanme #29; 5–2	West Sandanme #3; 4–3	East Makushita #56; 4–3
2012	East Makushita #48; 3–4	East Makushita #60; 2–5	East Sandanme #25; 5–2	East Makushita #60; 4–3	East Makushita #53; 5–2	West Makushita #35; 3–4
2013	West Makushita #43; 3–4	West Makushita #51; 5–2	East Makushita #31; 3–4	West Makushita #41; 4–3	East Makushita #34; 4–3	East Makushita #27; 3–4
2014	East Makushita #35; 5–2	East Makushita #20; 3–4	West Makushita #27; 5–2	West Makushita #15; 3–4	West Makushita #20; 4–3	West Makushita #17; 3–4
2015	East Makushita #25; 4–3	West Makushita #21; 6–1	East Makushita #7; 4–3	East Makushita #5; 4–3	West Makushita #1; 6–1	East Jūryō #9; 6–9
2016	East Jūryō #11; 7–8	East Jūryō #12; 8–7	East Jūryō #11; 10–5	West Jūryō #7; 5–10	East Jūryō #11; 4–11	West Makushita #3; 4–3
2017	East Makushita #2; 3–4	West Makushita #4; 3–4	East Makushita #6; 3–4	West Makushita #10; 4–3	West Makushita #8; 4–3	West Makushita #6; 6–1
2018	East Makushita #2; 3–4	West Makushita #3; 6–1	West Jūryō #12; 3–11–1	East Makushita #4; Sat out due to injury 0–0–7	East Makushita #45; Sat out due to injury 0–0–7	West Sandanme #25; 4–3
2019	East Sandanme #15; 7–0; Champion	West Makushita #13; 3–4	West Makushita #18; 4–3	East Makushita #13; 5–2	East Makushita #7; 2–5	East Makushita #17; 6–1
2020	West Makushita #6; 4–3	East Makushita #3; 6–1	West Jūryō #10; Tournament Cancelled; 0–0–0	West Jūryō #10; 3–12	East Makushita #4; 1–6	East Makushita #26; 5–2
2021	East Makushita #15; 4–3	West Makushita #11; 2–5	West Makushita #20; 4–3	West Makushita #15; 4–3	West Makushita #10; 4–3	West Makushita #5; 3–4
2022	West Makushita #10; 2–5	East Makushita #24; 3–4	East Makushita #29; 3–4	West Makushita #39; 3–4	West Makushita #46; 2–5	West Sandanme #5; 2–5
2023	East Sandanme #31; 6–1	East Makushita #48; 2–5	West Sandanme #9; 4–3	West Makushita #58; 2–5	West Sandanme #15; 4–3	West Sandanme #5; 3–4
2024	East Sandanme #19; 3–4	East Sandanme #31; 4–3	East Sandanme #19; Sat out due to injury 0–0–7	West Sandanme #79; Retired; 0–0–4	x	x
Record given as wins–losses–absences Top division champion Top division runner-up Retired Lower divisions Non-participation Sanshō key: F=Fighting spirit; O=Outstanding performance; T=Technique Also shown: ★=Kinboshi; P=Playoff(s); Divisions: Makuuchi — Jūryō — Makushita — Sandanme — Jonidan — Jonokuchi Makuuchi ranks: Yokozuna — Ōzeki — Sekiwake — Komusubi — Maegashira

== See also ==
- Glossary of sumo terms
- List of active sumo wrestlers
- List of the heaviest sumo wrestlers
