= Asashio =

Asashio, meaning "morning tide" in Japanese, may refer to:

== Japanese naval ships ==
- Japanese destroyer Asashio (1902), a Shirakumo-class destroyer of the Imperial Japanese Navy during the Russo-Japanese War
- Japanese destroyer Asashio (1936), lead ship of the 1936 Asashio class
  - Asashio-class destroyer, a class of ten destroyers of the Imperial Japanese Navy during World War II
- JDS Asashio (SS-562), lead ship of the 1965 Asashio class
  - Asashio-class submarine, a class of four submarines of the Japanese Maritime Self-Defense Force in 1965
- JDS Asashio (SS-589), a Harushio-class submarine of the Japanese Maritime Self-Defense Force in 1995

== People ==
- Asashio Tarō (disambiguation), several Japanese sumo wrestlers
- Minanogawa Tōzō (1903–1971), Japanese sumo wrestler
