= Nankairyū Tarō =

Former sumo wrestler from Samoa

Personal information
- Native name: 南海龍太郎
- Born: Kilifi Sapa; February 22, 1965 (age 61) Apia, Samoa
- Height: 1.88 m (6 ft 2 in)
- Weight: 153 kg (337 lb)

Sport
- Sport: Sumo
- Retired: November, 1988
- Heya: Takasago
- Record: 139-93-1
- Debut: September, 1984
- Highest rank: Maegashira 2 (May, 1988)
- Updated on August 2007

Nankairyū Tarō (born 22 February 1965 as Kilifi Sapa) is a former sumo wrestler from Samoa. His highest rank was maegashira 2. He was the third foreign-born wrestler to reach the top makuuchi division after Takamiyama and Konishiki. However he quit sumo suddenly in September 1988 after an argument with the head coach of Takasago stable about his persistent drinking problem. He was also a trainee for New Japan Pro Wrestling.

== Career ==
Born in Apia, Western Samoa, he joined Takasago stable in 1984, after he responded to a TV recruitment campaign placed by a Japanese businessman. He was picked out of a group of around 300 youths by the former sekiwake Takamiyama. Another Samoan, Nanyozakura (Fofoga Faaleva), joined at the same time. Sapa was given the fighting name of Nankairyū, or "South Seas dragon." Although he was not unusually large for sumo he was a superb athlete and was dedicated to training. He was highly thought of by his stable-mate Konishiki and also yokozuna Chiyonofuji, who saw that Nankairyū had a similar physique to himself and sought him out to train with.

In 1987 he fought the Taiwanese wrestler Tochinohana in the jūryō division, which according to the Japan Sumo Association was the first ever bout between two foreign sekitori. In November 1987 he became the third non-Asian sumo wrestler, after Takamiyama and Konishiki, to reach the top makuuchi division. In May 1988 he reached his highest rank of maegashira 2 and upset ōzeki Hokuten'yū. He also looked to have defeated yokozuna Ōnokuni but a rematch was called, which he lost.

Nankairyū was a heavy drinker, and received adverse publicity after he got into a confrontation with a hotel clerk while drunk in July 1987. His problem was made worse by the fact that he spoke neither English nor Japanese well, needing a Samoan interpreter around his stable, and consequently he had difficulty making himself understood to the Japanese media. On the 14th day of the September 1988 tournament he withdrew claiming a stomach complaint, but in fact he had drunk so much the night before he was in no condition to compete. He had a heated argument with his stable boss, former yokozuna Asashio Tarō III, who told him to choose between sumo and the bottle, and Nankairyū fled the stable to go back to Samoa. The head of the Sumo Association Futagoyama, declared that Nankairyū would never be allowed to compete again even if he did return. Nankairyū remained listed on the banzuke for the November 1988 tournament as retirement papers were not forwarded until October, after the new rankings were drawn up. This oversight prevented Hananofuji from taking Nankairyū's top division spot, as he was moved from jūryō 1 West to jūryō 1 East instead. (Hananofuji was never to reach makuuchi in his career.) His stablemaster died of a stroke just a few weeks after Nankairyū ran away, on October 23, 1988.

Nankairyu told a Japanese weekly newspaper after he had returned to Western Samoa that "there are too many rules in sumo. After a match, you go back to the stable and all they do is order you around like a child."

== After sumo ==
Nankairyū attempted to transition to professional wrestling by joining New Japan Pro Wrestling in September 1990 as part of Tatsumi Fujinami's "Dragon Bombers" unit as a trainee alongside fellow former sumo Taylor Wily. Before joining NJPW, he wrote a pledge that he would not drink any alcohol. However, one week before he was set to debut, he was arrested for driving under the influence and destruction of property, as he drunkenly threw his motorcycle at another person's car. He was immediately fired by NJPW and he returned to Western Samoa.

== Career record ==
Nankairyū Tarō
Year	January Hatsu basho, Tokyo	March Haru basho, Osaka	May Natsu basho, Tokyo	July Nagoya basho, Nagoya	September Aki basho, Tokyo	November Kyūshū basho, Fukuoka
1984	x	x	x	x	(Maezumo)	West Jonokuchi #40; 5–2
1985	West Jonidan #124; 6–1	East Jonidan #51; 7–0–P	West Sandanme #62; 6–1	West Sandanme #18; 2–5	West Sandanme #49; 3–4	East Sandanme #62; 6–1
1986	East Sandanme #17; 4–3	West Sandanme #3; 6–1	West Makushita #33; 3–4	West Makushita #45; 4–3	West Makushita #30; 5–2	East Makushita #16; 6–1
1987	West Makushita #3; 4–3	West Makushita #2; 4–3	West Jūryō #13; 10–5	East Jūryō #8; 9–6	East Jūryō #4; 11–4	West Maegashira #12; 8–7
1988	East Maegashira #12; 8–7	East Maegashira #8; 9–6	West Maegashira #2; 6–9	East Maegashira #5; 7–8	West Maegashira #5; 6–8–1	East Maegashira #9; Retired; 0–0
Record given as wins–losses–absences Top division champion Top division runner-up Retired Lower divisions Non-participation Sanshō key: F=Fighting spirit; O=Outstanding performance; T=Technique Also shown: ★=Kinboshi; P=Playoff(s); Divisions: Makuuchi — Jūryō — Makushita — Sandanme — Jonidan — Jonokuchi Makuuchi ranks: Yokozuna — Ōzeki — Sekiwake — Komusubi — Maegashira

== See also ==
- Glossary of sumo terms
- List of non-Japanese sumo wrestlers
- List of past sumo wrestlers
