= Asagyokusei Taiko =

Japanese sumo wrestler

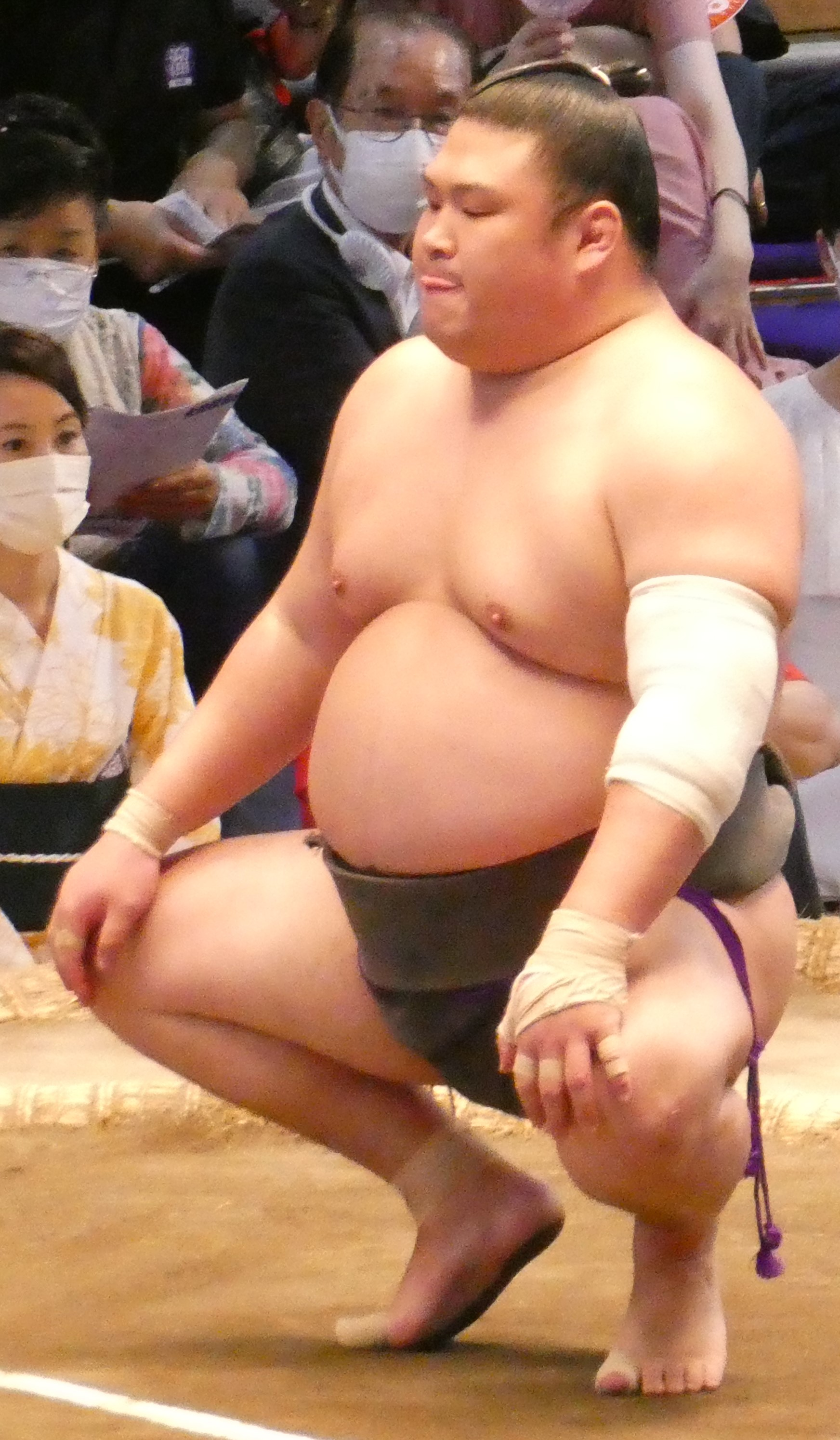

Personal information
- Native name: 朝玉勢 大幸
- Born: Kazuma Tamaki; May 29, 1993 (age 33) Ise, Mie
- Height: 1.81 m (5 ft 11 1/2 in)
- Weight: 139.5 kg (308 lb)

Sport
- Sport: Sumo
- Rank: see below
- University team: Kindai University
- Heya: Takasago
- Debut: January 2016
- Highest rank: Jūryō 12 (January 2020)
- Championships: 1 (Jonidan); 1 (Jonokuchi)
- Updated on February 23, 2026

Asagyokusei Taiko (Japanese 朝玉勢 大幸, born May 29, 1993, as Kazuma Tamaki) is a Japanese professional sumo wrestler from Mie Prefecture. He debuted in January 2016 and he reached his highest rank of jūryō 12 in January 2020. He wrestles for Takasago stable.

== Early life and sumo background ==
Born in Ise, Mie in 1993, he was active in his schools' sumo clubs throughout his childhood and eventually became the captain of Kindai University's sumo club.

== Career ==
Debuting in maezumō in January 2016, he posted a 2–2 record. In his first tournament in March 2016, where he was ranked in jonokuchi, he won the yūshō with a perfect 7-0 record and went on to win the jonidan yūshō, also with a perfect record, the next tournament in May 2016. The next tournament in September 2016 he was promoted to sandanme where he posted a 6–1 record which saw him further promoted to makushita.

For almost three years he remained in makushita until September 2019 when he was promoted to jūryō 14. His record of 5–10 that tournament sent him back to makushita in the November 2019 tournament, however, he managed to get promoted back to jūryō where he reached his highest rank of jūryō 12 in January 2020. He once again failed to post a winning record but managed to keep his rank where he also failed to post a winning score in March 2020, which sent him back to makushita in July 2020.

As of January 2026, he is currently fighting in the makushita division.

== Fighting style ==
Asagyokusei is an oshi-style wrestler, employing kimarite such as yorikiri and kotenage.

== Career record ==
Asagyokusei Taiko
Year	January Hatsu basho, Tokyo	March Haru basho, Osaka	May Natsu basho, Tokyo	July Nagoya basho, Nagoya	September Aki basho, Tokyo	November Kyūshū basho, Fukuoka
2016	(Maezumō)	West Jonokuchi #19; 7–0; Champion	West Jonidan #10; 7–0; Champion	East Sandanme #19; 6–1	East Makushita #41; 6–1	East Makushita #17; 4–3
2017	West Makushita #10; 3–4	East Makushita #15; 3–4	West Makushita #20; 3–4	West Makushita #30; 4–3	East Makushita #23; 5–2	East Makushita #15; 4–3
2018	West Makushita #10; 3–5	East Makushita #19; 5–2	East Makushita #12; 4–3	East Makushita #9; 5–2	East Makushita #4; 4–3	East Makushita #3; 2–6
2019	East Makushita #19; 4–3	East Makushita #12; 5–2	East Makushita #5; 4–3	East Makushita #3; 4–3	East Jūryō #14; 5–10	East Makushita #2; 5–2
2020	East Jūryō #12; 7–8	West Jūryō #12; 5–10	East Makushita #2; Tournament Cancelled; State of Emergency; 0–0–0	East Makushita #2; 2–5	East Makushita #10; 2–5	West Makushita #27; 4–3
2021	East Makushita #20; 5–2	East Makushita #13; 2–5	East Makushita #23; 4–3	West Makushita #16; 4–3	West Makushita #12; 4–3	East Makushita #7; 3–4
2022	West Makushita #14; 4–3	West Makushita #10; 4–3	West Makushita #7; 2–5	West Makushita #16; 3–4	West Makushita #25; 3–4	East Makushita #31; 2–5
2023	East Makushita #52; 5–2	West Makushita #32; 2–5	West Makushita #46; 5–2	West Makushita #32; 6–1	East Makushita #13; 4–3	West Makushita #9; 3–4
2024	West Makushita #17; 3–4	East Makushita #26; 3–4	East Makushita #31; 1–6	East Makushita #59; 5–2	West Makushita #37; 3–4	East Makushita #46; 3–4
2025	East Makushita #58; 0–3–4	West Sandanme #33; 6–1	East Makushita #49; 3–4	East Makushita #59; 3–4	East Sandanme #11; 3–4	East Sandanme #23; 5–2
2026	East Makushita #58; 5–2	East Makushita #36; 3–4	East Makushita #45; 2–5	West Sandanme #2; 5–2	West Makushita #43; 3–4	East Makushita #52; 3–4
Record given as wins–losses–absences Top division champion Top division runner-up Retired Non-participation Jūryō Lower divisions Sanshō key: F=Fighting spirit; O=Outstanding performance; T=Technique Also shown: ★=Kinboshi; P=Playoff(s); Divisions: Makuuchi — Jūryō — Makushita — Sandanme — Jonidan — Jonokuchi Makuuchi ranks: Yokozuna — Ōzeki — Sekiwake — Komusubi — Maegashira

== See also ==
- Glossary of sumo terms
- List of active sumo wrestlers
