= Azumafuji Kin'ichi =

Japanese sumo wrestler

東富士 欽壹 Azumafuji Kin'ichi
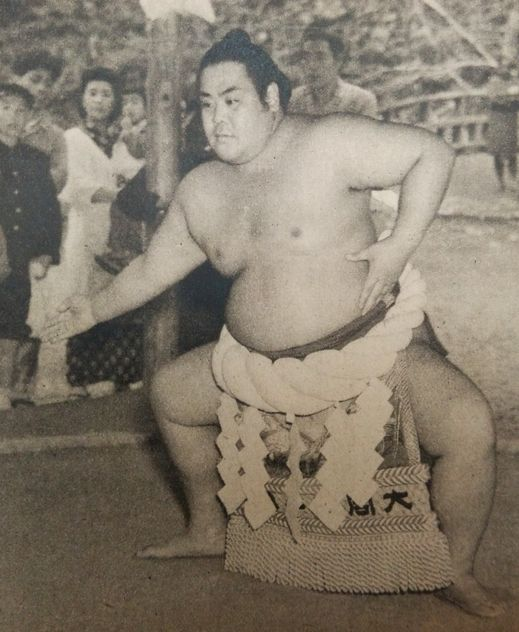
- Azumafuji performing his yokozuna ring-entering ceremony, late 1948

Personal information
- Born: Inoue Kin'ichi; October 28, 1921 Tokyo, Japan
- Died: July 31, 1973 (aged 51)
- Height: 1.79 m (5 ft 10 1/2 in)
- Weight: 178 kg (392 lb; 28.0 st)

Sport
- Sport: Sumo
- Retired: September, 1954
- Heya: Takasago
- Record: 335-137-54-1draws-1hold
- Debut: January 1936
- Highest rank: Yokozuna (October 1948)
- Elder name: Nishikido
- Championships: 6 (Makuuchi); 1 (Jūryō); 1 (Makushita)
- Updated on June 2020

Azumafuji Kin'ichi (Japanese: 東富士 欽壹; October 28, 1921 – July 31, 1973) was a Japanese professional sumo wrestler from Taitō, Tokyo. He was the sport's 40th yokozuna, and later a professional wrestler.

== Sumo career ==
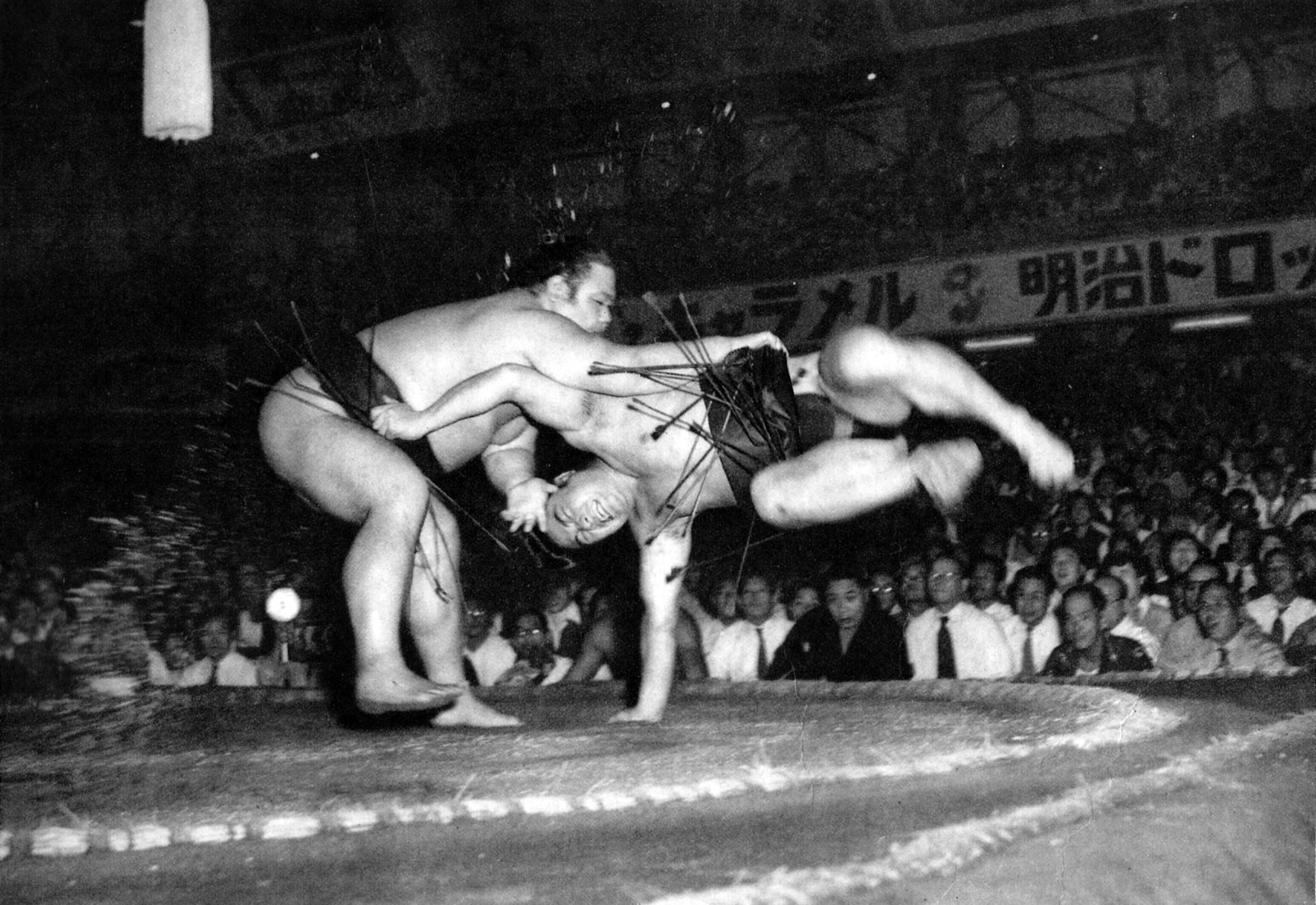
Azumafuji defeating Tochinishiki in the 1953 fall tournament

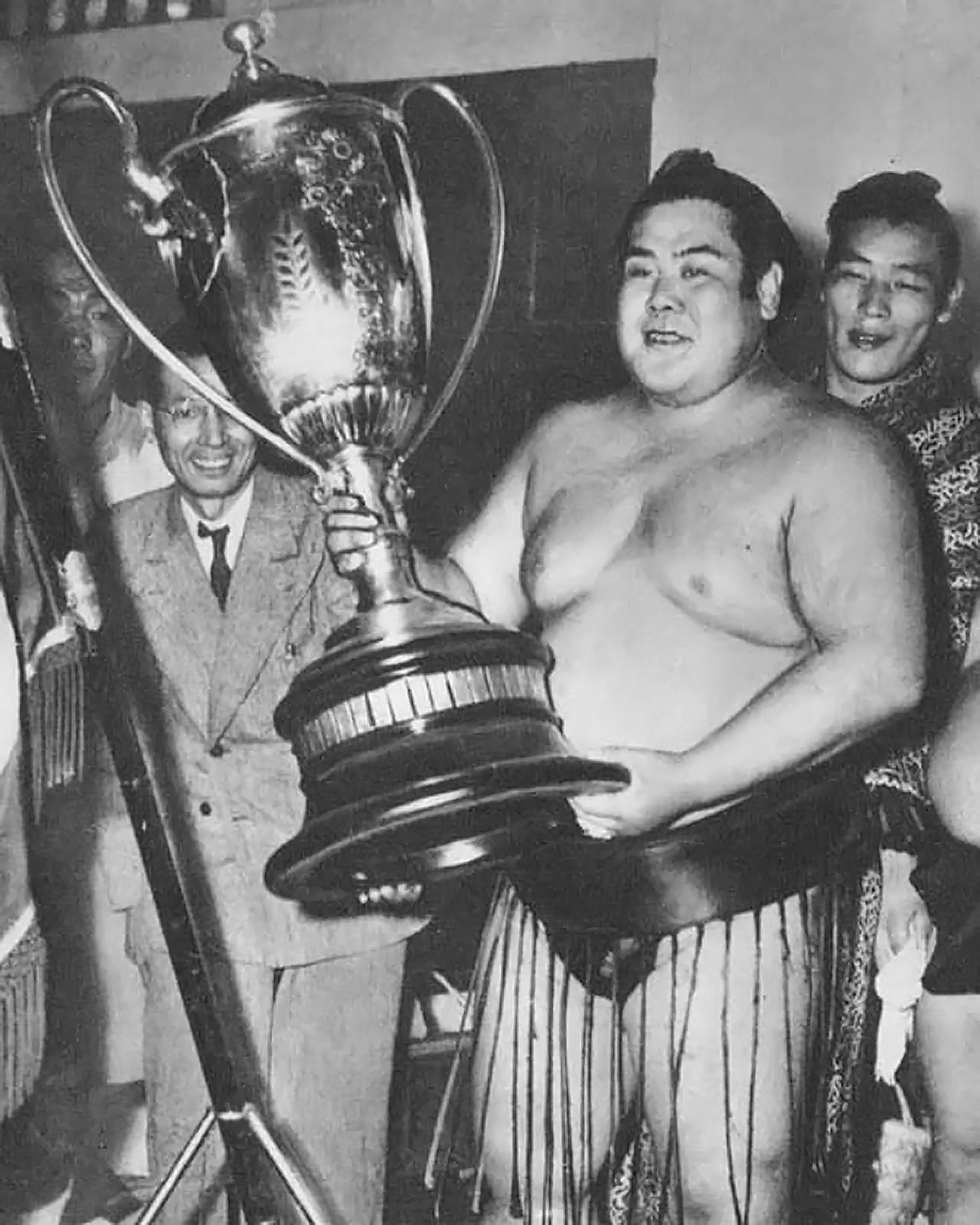
Azumafuji Kin'ichi with the Emperor's Cup (天皇賜杯, Tennō shihai) (Top Division Champion of Natsu Basho 1950)

Azumafuji's real name was Inoue Kin'ichi (井上 謹一). He made his professional debut in January 1936, joining Takasago stable. He was promoted to the top makuuchi division in May 1943. On the sixth day of the November 1944 tournament, he defeated yokozuna Futabayama, the last wrestler ever to do so as Futabayama pulled out of the tournament the next day and only fought one more bout before his retirement. Azumafuji was promoted to ōzeki in June 1945 on the strength of two runner-up performances. He won his first top division championship in May 1948, and was promoted to the top yokozuna rank in October of that year after finishing as runner-up. Going against historical trends, he managed to win his debut yokozuna tournament, in January 1949.

On the 12th day of the September 1951 tournament, Azumafuji recorded an azukari, or hold, a rare result. On that day, he had come down with acute pneumonia but he forced himself to continue in the tournament as he had only one loss. Azumafuji fought with then ōzeki Yoshibayama twice, but the outcome still could not be determined. After the second bout, Azumafuji could not stand up any more and conceded defeat, but the gentlemanly Yoshibayama insisted that the fairest result was to declare a hold, which was confirmed by the officials. Azumafuji went on to win the tournament, his fourth championship.

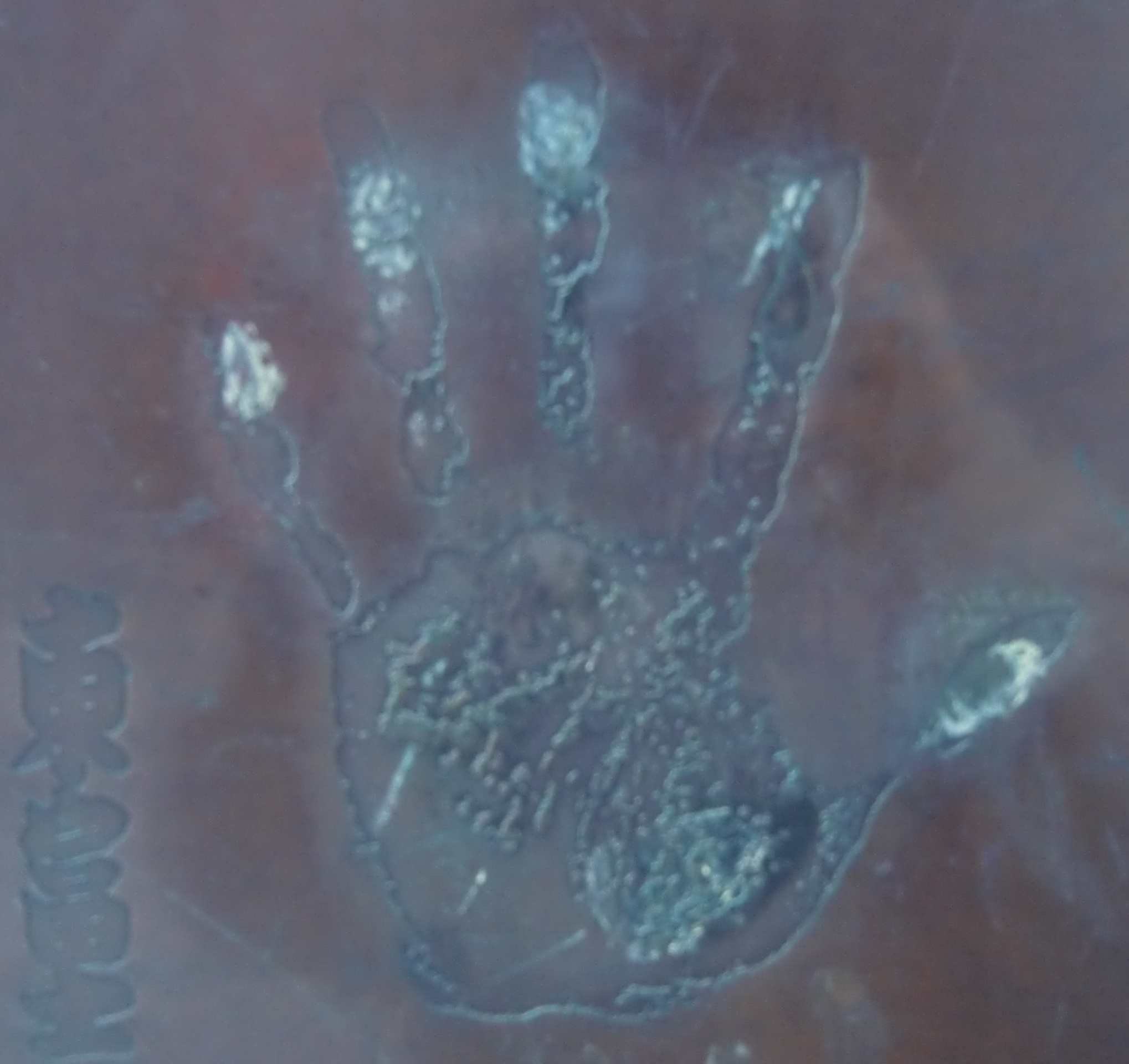
Azumafuji's handprint displayed on a monument in Ryōgoku, Tokyo

Azumafuji won his sixth and final championship in September 1953, and struggled with injuries after that. In September 1954, ōzeki Tochinishiki seemed certain to win his second consecutive championship. Azumafuji suddenly announced his retirement at that tournament, not wishing to hinder Tochinshiki's promotion to yokozuna. Had he remained, Tochinishiki would have become the fifth active yokozuna, an unprecedented situation. Tochinishiki reportedly asked Azumafuji to reconsider his decision, but to no avail.

== Professional wrestling career ==
Azumafuji was the first yokozuna to turn to Western-style professional wrestling, in 1955. This occurred after a dispute in the Japan Sumo Association between two other elders, Takasago and Tatsunami, which he wished to escape. In April 1955 he won the NWA Hawaii Tag Team Championship in Honolulu alongside another former sumo wrestler turned professional wrestler, Rikidōzan. In 1956 he defeated former judoka Toshio Yamaguchi to win the Japanese Heavyweight tournament. This tournament was supposed to give him a shot at Rikidozan, at the time the Japanese Heavyweight Champion, but the match never took place.

== Championships and accomplishments ==
- Mid-Pacific Promotions

- NWA Hawaii Tag Team Championship (1 time) - with Rikidōzan

== Sumo top division record ==
- From 1953 a New Year tournament was added and the Spring tournament began to be held in Osaka.

Azumafuji
-	Spring Haru basho, Tokyo	Summer Natsu basho, Tokyo	Autumn Aki basho, Tokyo
1943	x	East Maegashira #8; 10–5	Not held
1944	West Maegashira #1; 7–4–4	East Maegashira #2; 6–4	West Sekiwake; 9–1
1945	Not held	East Sekiwake #1; 6–1	East Ōzeki #1; 9–1
1946	Not held	Not held	East Ōzeki #1; 7–6
1947	Not held	West Ōzeki #2; 9–1–P	West Ōzeki #1; 6–5
1948	Not held	West Ōzeki #2; 10–1	West Ōzeki #1; 10–1–P
1949	West Yokozuna #2; 10–2; 1d	East Yokozuna #1; 8–7	West Yokozuna #2; 10–5
1950	West Yokozuna #1; 6–6–3	West Yokozuna #1; 14–1	East Yokozuna #1; 11–4
1951	West Yokozuna #1; 10–5	East Yokozuna #2; 12–3	East Yokozuna #1; 13–1; 1h
1952	East Yokozuna #1; 7–4–4	West Yokozuna #2; 13–2	East Yokozuna #1; 7–7–1
Record given as wins–losses–absences Top division champion Top division runner-up Retired Lower divisions Non-participation Sanshō key: F=Fighting spirit; O=Outstanding performance; T=Technique Also shown: ★=Kinboshi; P=Playoff(s); Divisions: Makuuchi — Jūryō — Makushita — Sandanme — Jonidan — Jonokuchi Makuuchi ranks: Yokozuna — Ōzeki — Sekiwake — Komusubi — Maegashira

-	New Year Hatsu basho, Tokyo	Spring Haru basho, Osaka	Summer Natsu basho, Tokyo	Autumn Aki basho, Tokyo
1953	West Yokozuna #1; 2–5–8	West Yokozuna #2; 12–3	East Yokozuna #1; 11–4	West Yokozuna #1; 14–1
1954	East Yokozuna #1; 3–7–5	West Yokozuna #2; 5–3–7	East Yokozuna #2; Sat out due to injury 0–0–15	East Yokozuna #2; Retired; 4–4–7
Record given as wins–losses–absences Top division champion Top division runner-up Retired Lower divisions Non-participation Sanshō key: F=Fighting spirit; O=Outstanding performance; T=Technique Also shown: ★=Kinboshi; P=Playoff(s); Divisions: Makuuchi — Jūryō — Makushita — Sandanme — Jonidan — Jonokuchi Makuuchi ranks: Yokozuna — Ōzeki — Sekiwake — Komusubi — Maegashira

*d = draw (引分) / h = hold (預り)

== See also ==
- Glossary of sumo terms
- List of past sumo wrestlers
- List of sumo tournament top division champions
- List of yokozuna

Preceded by Maedayama Eigorō	40th Yokozuna; 1948–1954	Succeeded by Chiyonoyama Masanobu
Yokozuna is not a successive rank, and more than one wrestler can hold the title at once
