= Asashio Tarō II =

Japanese sumo wrestler

Asashio Tarō
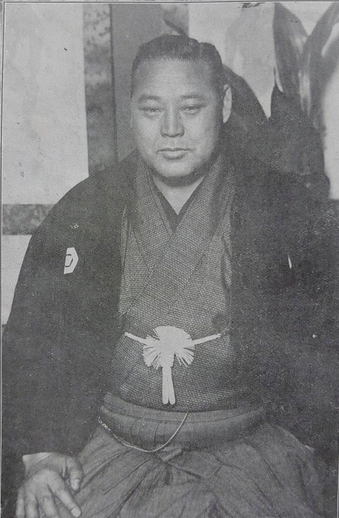
- Asashio in 1920

Personal information
- Native name: 朝潮 太郎
- Born: Chokichi Komota; April 19, 1879 Saijō, Ehime Prefecture; Japan
- Died: April 30, 1962 (aged 83)
- Height: 1.76 m (5 ft 9 1/2 in)
- Weight: 113 kg (249 lb; 17.8 st)

Sport
- Sport: Sumo
- Retired: May 1919
- Heya: Takasago
- Record: 111-67-66-26d-7h
- Debut: May 1901
- Highest rank: Ōzeki (January 1915)
- Elder name: Takasago

Asashio Tarō (Japanese: 朝潮 太郎; born Chokichi Komota (薦田 長吉), April 19, 1879 – April 30, 1962) was a Japanese professional sumo wrestler from Ehime Prefecture, Japan. He is the second wrestler to bear the shikona, or ring name, Asashio. He became the stablemaster of Takasago stable in 1915 while still active, and continued to run the stable after his retirement in 1919 until 1941, when he passed on the Takasago elder share to then ōzeki Maedayama. He died in 1962 at the age of 83.

== Early life and career ==
Asashio was born in Saijō in the Ehime Prefecture. At the age of 20, it is said he had the strength to lift a load nearly three times his body weight, and was expected to become a sumo wrestler. He entered the Takasago stable and became the protege of coach Sanoyama (former ōzeki Asashio). He entered his first tournament in 1901 under the shikona, or ring name, Asaarashi (朝嵐) but was later given the name Asashio (朝潮), the former ring name of his mentor, when he was promoted to sekiwake.
He was a popular wrestler because he had the appearance of an ancient samurai and a sportsman attitude in the ring. He was so strong with his right hand grip that he earned the nickname Migisashi Gomangoku (右差し五万石), 'right-hand grip worth fifty thousand koku'.
On the ninth day of the 1914 Summer tournament, he fought the unbeaten yokozuna Tachiyama. After a heated battle, Asashio collapsed on his torso and had to be placed under medical observation. Therefore the bout ended on a hold costing the tournament to Tachiyama. This match was highly regarded and Asashio was promoted to ōzeki after the tournament. As a makuuchi wrestler, Asashio had a record of 98 victories, 64 losses, 25 draws and 7 holds in twenty-six tournaments (including ten as ōzeki).

== Retirement from sumo ==
In 1913, he had a dispute with another apprentice Ayagawa (綾川) over who should succeed former sekiwake Takamiyama as stablemaster. The dispute ended up in court, but Asashio won the case and assumed the elder name Takasago under a two-name license, allowing him to run the stable and participate to tournaments as a wrestler.
After retiring from the ring, he devoted himself to running his stable as the third generation Takasago. He trained yokozuna Minanogawa and Maedayama. In 1929 Akutsugawa, a former wrestler and coach at Takasago stable, encouraged Minanogawa to join his newly established Sadogatake stable. However Asashio did not want his promising rikishi to leave the stable and even proposed to change Minanogawa's shikona to his own of Asashio to obligate him to stay. Eventually a compromise was worked out and Minanogawa divided his time between the two stables.

Asashio also became a director of the Japan Sumo Association, but submitted his resignation in 1932 after taking responsibility for the Shunjuen Incident. In December 1941, he handed over his stable and title to Maedayama. In 1950, at Maedayama's retirement ceremony, he made the final cut in the ōichōmage as a former stablemaster. Asashio died April 30, 1962 at the age of 83.

A stone monument was erected in the premises of the Omachi's Saijō shrine, in his hometown of Saijō, Ehime.

== Top Division Record ==
Asashio Tarō
-	Spring	Summer
1906	East Jūryō #8; 6–1; 1d	East Jūryō #1; 7–2
1907	West Maegashira #8; 4–4–1; 1d	West Maegashira #5; 4–2–1; 3d
1908	West Maegashira #2; 4–3–1; 1d-1h	West Maegashira #1; 5–3–1; 1d
1909	East Komusubi #1; 3–4–1; 1d-1h	East Komusubi #1; 5–3; 2d
1910	East Komusubi #1; 4–3; 2d-2h	East Sekiwake #1; 6–2; 2d
1911	East Sekiwake #1; 2–6; 2d	East Maegashira #3; 3–7
1912	West Maegashira #11; 6–2; 2d	East Maegashira #1; 6–1; 3d
1913	East Sekiwake #1; 3–3–4	West Maegashira #1; 5–3; 2d
1914	West Sekiwake #1; 6–3–1	East Sekiwake #1; 4–2; 1d-3h
1915	East Ōzeki #2; 0–1–8; 1d	West Ōzeki #2; 7–1–2
1916	Sat out	West Ōzeki #2; 5–1–4
1917	East Ōzeki #1; 0–1–9	East Ōzeki #2; 6–3; 1d
1918	Sat out	East Ōzeki #3; 6–2–1; 1h
1919	West Ōzeki #1; 3–2–5	West Ōzeki #2; Retired; 1–2–7
Record given as win-loss-absent Top Division Champion Top Division Runner-up Retired Lower Divisions Key:d=Draw(s) (引分); h=Hold(s) (預り); Divisions: Makuuchi — Jūryō — Makushita — Sandanme — Jonidan — Jonokuchi Makuuchi ranks: Yokozuna — Ōzeki — Sekiwake — Komusubi — Maegashira

== See also ==
- Glossary of sumo terms
- List of past sumo wrestlers
- List of ōzeki
