= Asashio Tarō I =

Japanese sumo wrestler (1864–1920)

Asashio Tarō
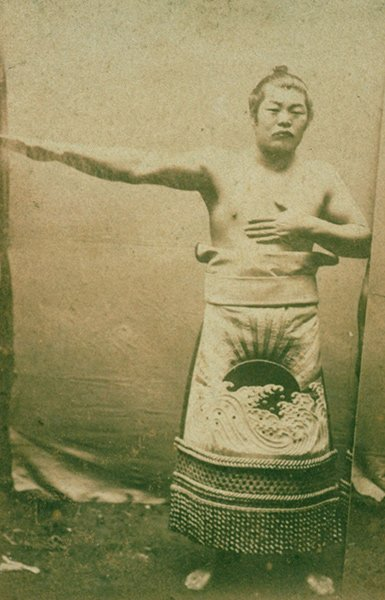

Personal information
- Native name: 朝汐 太郎
- Born: 増原 太郎吉; Tarokichi Masuhara; 1864 Uwa, Ehime Prefecture
- Died: August 26, 1920 (aged 55)
- Height: 1.79 m (5 ft 10 1/2 in)
- Weight: 102 kg (225 lb; 16 st 1 lb)

Sport
- Sport: Sumo
- Retired: January, 1908
- Heya: Oshiogawa → Takasago
- Record: 144-78-103; 32 draws-12 holds (Makuuchi)
- Debut: 1883
- Highest rank: Ozeki (May, 1898)
- Elder name: Sanoyama
- Championships: 2 (Makuuchi, unofficial)
- Updated on Nov 4, 2022

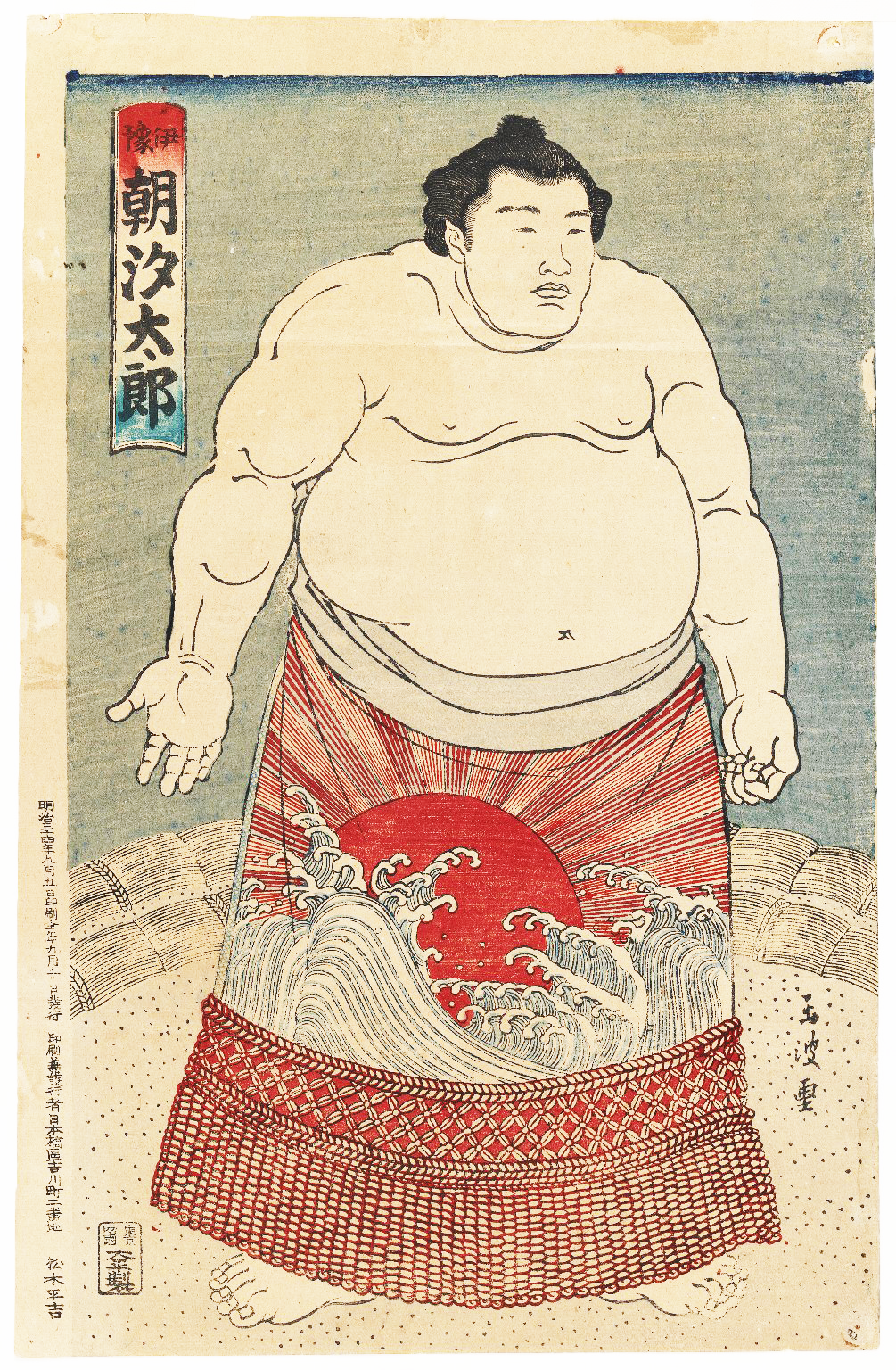
Asashio Tarō I, ukiyo-e 1901

Asashio Tarō (朝汐 太郎, November 28, 1864 – August 26, 1920) was a sumo wrestler from Ehime Prefecture, Japan. His highest rank was ozeki.

== Career ==
In 1881, at the age of 17, he entered Osaka sumo's Oshiogawa stable, and took part to his first tournament in 1883 under the name of Asashio. Unsatisfied, Tarokichi moved to Tokyo in 1889 and was recruited by the Takasago stable to join Tokyo sumo . In Tokyo sumo, he debuted in January 1890 as a Juryo.

He was promoted to sekiwake in January 1893 and served as such for 11 consecutive tournaments (five years), when the tournaments were dominated by Nishinoumi and Konishiki. He was finally promoted to ozeki in May 1898 and was given a kesho-mawashi decorated with the Date family crest, "Bamboo and Sparrow," by Date Munenari, the former lord of the Uwajima Domain. Asashio served as an ōzeki for 5 years (10 tournaments) until January 1903. In 1900, he participated in a local tour in Ehime Prefecture, and a performance was also held in his hometown of Yawatahama. He participated in the cooperation of wealthy local merchants to build an earthen bridge. The bridge came to be called "Asashio Bridge" and although the river and bridge are gone, the name of the place is still associated with Asashio Bridge in current Osaka.

In January 1903, Asashio lost his rank of ozeki. In December 1904, he was granted a one-day yokozuna license and permitted to do a dohyo-iri by the Yoshida Tsukasa family, in recognition of his many years of service as an ozeki.

== Retirement ==
He retired at the age of 43. After his retirement, he assumed the name of Sanoyama. He first founded his own stable but disbanded it and returned to his original Takasago stable as a coach, where he notably recruited Komota Chokichi and passed down his shikona to him. He died in old age on August 26, 1920.

== Top division record ==
Asashio Tarō
-	Spring	Summer
1890	West Jūryō #1; 6–2–1; 1d	East Maegashira #10; 5–2–1; 2d
1891	East Maegashira #3; 6–2–1; 1d	East Maegashira #2; 1–2–6
1892	East Maegashira #3; 6–2–1	East Maegashira #1; 5–1–1
1893	East Sekiwake #1; 7–1–1; 1d	East Sekiwake #1; 7–1–1
1894	East Sekiwake #1; 2–5–1; 1d	Sekiwake #1; 8–1–1; 1d Unofficial
1895	East Sekiwake #1; 6–1–1	Sat out
1896	East Sekiwake #1; 4–3–1; 1d	East Sekiwake #2; 7–2–1
1897	East Sekiwake #2; 6–2–1; 1d	East Sekiwake #1; 5–2–1; 1d
1898	East Sekiwake #1; 4–0–5	Ōzeki #1; 7–1–1; 1d Unofficial
1899	East Ōzeki #1; 6–1–1; 1d	East Ōzeki #1; 5–3–1; 1d
1900	East Ōzeki #1; 5–1–2; 2d	East Ōzeki #1; 3–4–2; 1d
1901	East Ōzeki #1; 0–2–8	West Ōzeki #2; 5–2–1; 2d
1902	West Ōzeki #2; 2–5–1; 2d	West Ōzeki #2; 6–1–1; 2d
1903	West Ōzeki #2; 4–4–1; 1d	West Sekiwake #1; 4–4–1; 1d
1904	West Komusubi #1; 2–5–1; 2d	East Komusubi #1; 5–3–2
1905	Sat out	East Maegashira #1; 1–0–8; 1d
1906	West Komusubi #1; 1–5–1; 3d	West Maegashira #4; 1–3–6
1907	West Maegashira #6; 2–5–1; 1d	Sat out
1908	Sat out	West Maegashira; Retired; 0–0
Record given as win-loss-absent Top Division Champion Top Division Runner-up Retired Lower Divisions Key:d=Draw(s) (引分); h=Hold(s) (預り); Divisions: Makuuchi — Jūryō — Makushita — Sandanme — Jonidan — Jonokuchi Makuuchi ranks: Yokozuna — Ōzeki — Sekiwake — Komusubi — Maegashira

*Championships for the best record in a tournament were not recognized or awarded before the 1909 summer tournament and the above unofficial championships are historically conferred. For more information see yūshō.
