= Takasago stable =

Organization of sumo wrestlers

Coordinates: 35.7028°N 139.8038°E

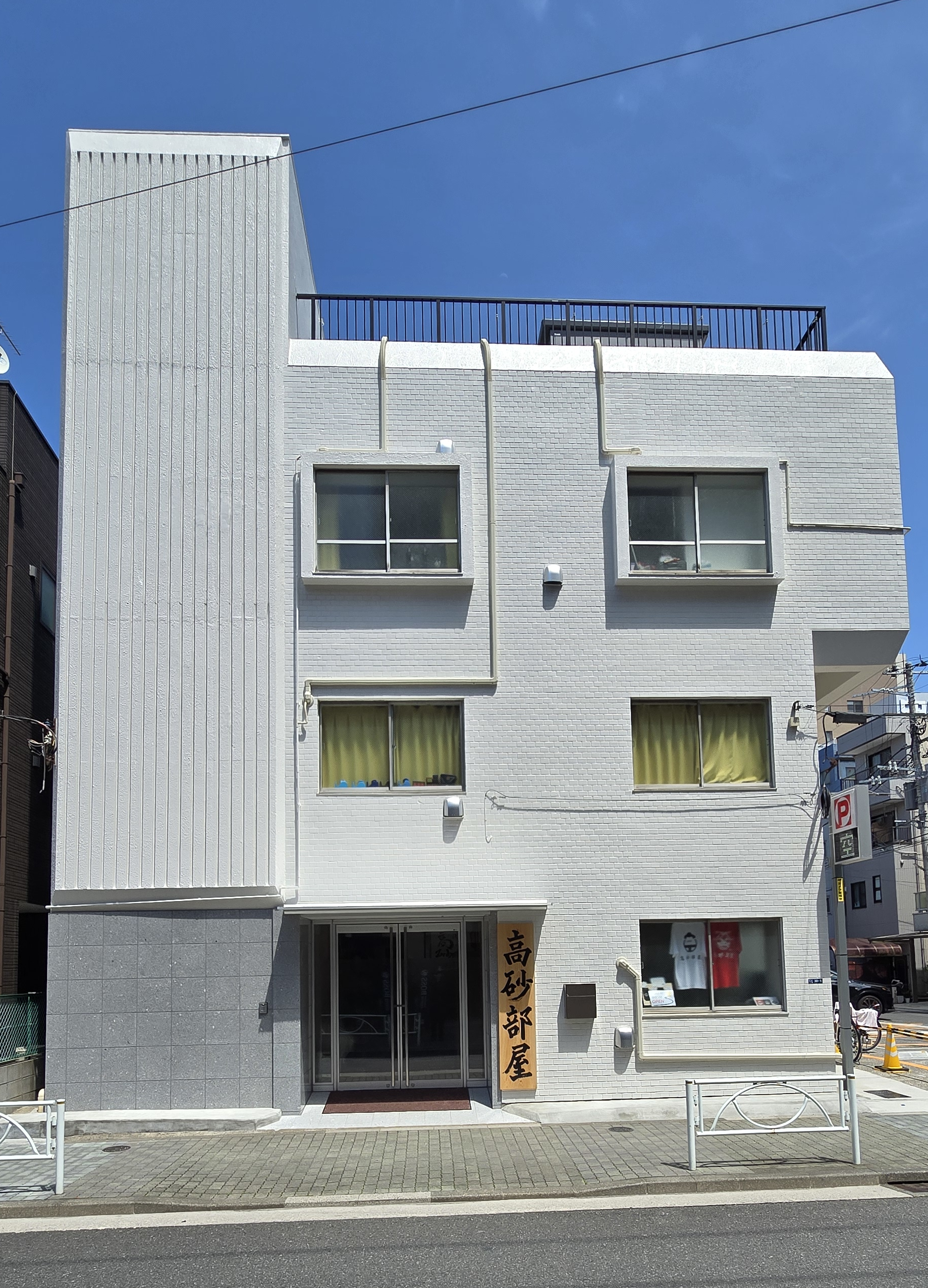
The current Takasago stable building in Ishiwara

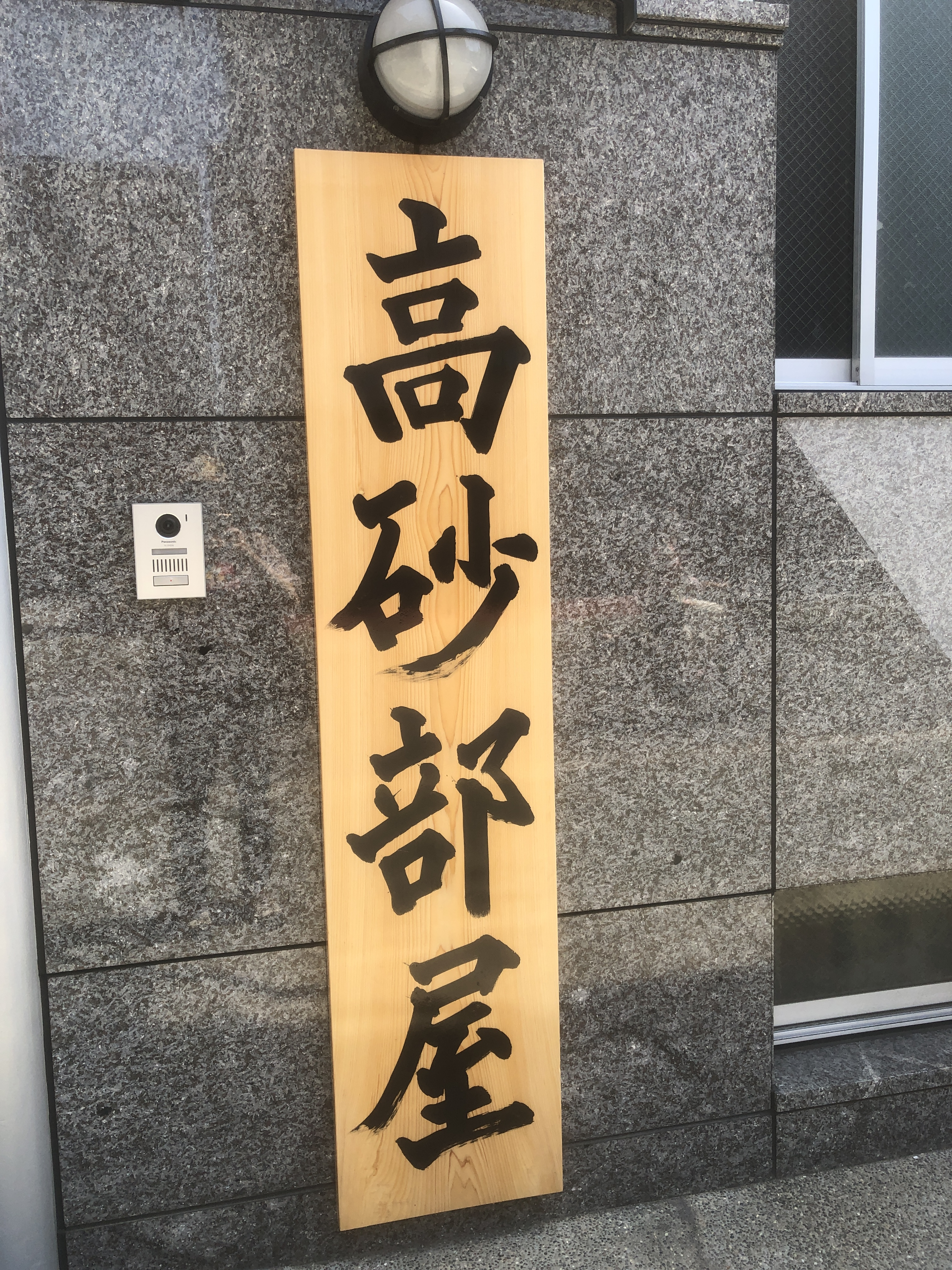

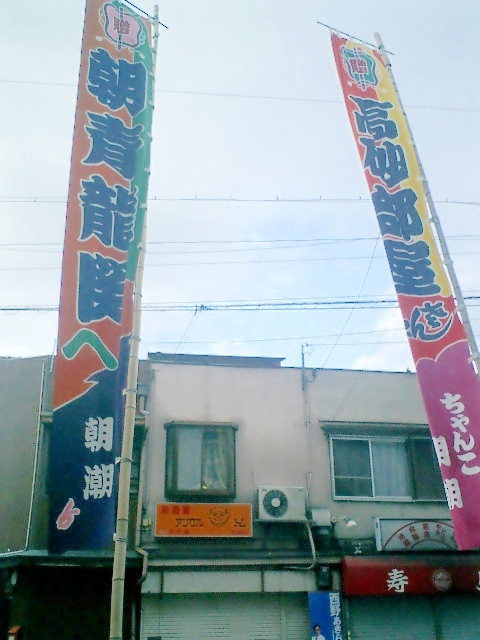
A nobori (right) supporting Takasago stable

Takasago stable (髙砂部屋 or 高砂部屋, Takasago-beya) is a stable of sumo wrestlers, one of the Takasago group of stables. It is correctly written in Japanese as "髙砂部屋", but the first of these kanji is rare, and is more commonly written as "高砂部屋".

As of May 2026, the stable has 26 active wrestlers.

== History ==
The stable was established by former maegashira Takasago Uragorō as Takasago Kaisei-Gumi (高砂改正組) in 1873 and joined the Tokyo Sumo Association in 1878. Takasago stable has produced many successful wrestlers, including seven yokozuna and the first non-Japanese ōzeki, American Konishiki, as well as the 33rd Kimura Shōnosuke, the tate-gyōji or chief referee.

In February 2002, the stable merged with Wakamatsu stable, with Wakamatsu's coach, ōzeki Asashio, taking over. Future yokozuna Asashōryū was among the wrestlers transferring over. The demotion of Asasekiryū to the makushita division for the January 2017 tournament saw the stable without any sekitori for the first time since 1878. However, at the end of that tournament Asanoyama earned promotion to the jūryō division, ensuring sekitori representation once again from March. As of January 2023, it had 25 wrestlers. The former Asasekiryū, who had reached the rank of sekiwake in 2007, took over from the former Asashio as head coach of the stable in November 2020.

In June 2021, ōzeki Asanoyama was handed a one-year (six tournament) suspension for violating sumo protocols related to COVID-19. The following month stablemaster Takasago (the former Asasekiryū), Asanoyama and six lower-ranked rikishi in the stable all tested positive for COVID-19.

In December 2024 it was reported by Nikkan Sports that Takasago stable would be moving to a new three-story building under construction in Sumida ward that is closer to the Ryōgoku Kokugikan and will have more space for wrestlers to practice and rest. The stable later confirmed that they will move into the new building on 2 February 2025. That day, the stable performed the dedication ceremony for its new building in the presence of Chairman Hakkaku (the former Hokutoumi) and the stable's former yokozuna, Asashōryū. The sport's newly crowned yokozuna, Hōshōryū, also performed his ring-entering ceremony to dedicate the training area.

Takasago Stable saw three sekitori promotions for the September 2025 tournament, the first time this had happened in a sumo stable since three wrestlers were promoted at Sadogatake stable in September 1979.

In October 2026, it was revealed that the stable was the subject of a documentary: On the Edge of the Sumo Ring (土俵際, Dohyōgiwa). Released on Netflix in November of that same year after a year of filming, the documentary explores topics such as the role of the stablemaster, Asanoyama's return following his suspension, and the daily life of a young recruit.

== People ==
=== Ring name conventions ===
Most wrestlers since the mid 1990s and all since 2003 at this stable have quickly taken ring names or shikona that begin with the character 朝 (read: asa), meaning morning, in deference to their head coach, the former Asashio, as well as many of his predecessors who had the same shikona in their active years. For example, the wrestler formerly known as Tamaki changed his shikona to Asagyokusei when he was promoted to jūryō in July 2019.

=== Owners ===
- 2020–present: 8th Takasago (iin, sekiwake Asasekiryū)
- 2002–2020: 7th Takasago (ōzeki Asashio IV)
- 1988–2002: 6th Takasago (komusubi Fujinishiki)
- 1971–1988: 5th Takasago (46th yokozuna Asashio III)
- 1942–1971: 4th Takasago (39th yokozuna Maedayama)
- 1915–1941: 3rd Takasago (ōzeki Asashio II)
- 1900–1914: 2nd Takasago (sekiwake Takamiyama)
- 1873–1900: 1st Takasago (maegashira Takasago, 1838–1900)

=== Notable active wrestlers ===
- Asanoyama (best rank ōzeki)
- Asakōryū (best rank maegashira)
- Asahakuryū (best rank maegashira)
- Asasuiryū (best rank maegashira)
- Asagyokusei (best rank jūryō)
- Asashiyū (best rank jūryō)
- Asanowaka (best rank jūryō)

=== Coaches ===
- Wakamatsu Takehito (iin, maegashira Asanowaka)

=== Assistant ===
- Iyozakura (wakaimonogashira, jūryō 11, real name Masayuki Ichiki)

=== Notable former members ===
- Nishinoumi I (16th yokozuna)
- Konishiki I (17th yokozuna)
- Minanogawa (34th yokozuna)
- Maedayama (39th yokozuna)
- Azumafuji (40th yokozuna)
- Asashio III (46th yokozuna)
- Asashōryū (68th yokozuna)
- Zōgahana (former ōzeki)
- Ichinoya (former ōzeki)
- Asashio I (former ōzeki)
- Tachihikari (former ōzeki)
- Asashio II (former ōzeki)
- Maenoyama (former ōzeki)
- Asashio IV (former ōzeki)
- Konishiki VI (former ōzeki)
- Ōdate (best rank sekiwake, later ōzeki after eviction)
- Takamiyama (former sekiwake)
- Takamiyama II (former sekiwake)
- Takamiyama III (former sekiwake)
- Fujizakura (former sekiwake)
- Mitoizumi (former sekiwake)
- Asasekiryū (former sekiwake)
- Asabenkei (former jūryō)

=== Referees ===
- Kimura Asanosuke (makuuchi gyōji, real name Katsuya Ishida)
- Kimura Satoshi (makushita gyōji, real name Satoshi Maeda)

=== Ushers ===
- Rikinojō (makuuchi yobidashi, real name Riki Tsuchida)
- Kunio (jūryō yobidashi, real name Kunio Maekawa)

== Location and access ==
2-30-1 Ishiwara, Sumida, Tokyo
5 minute walk from Ryōgoku Kokugikan and Ryōgoku Station (JR Chūō-Sōbu Line, Toei Ōedo Line)

== See also ==
- List of sumo stables
- List of active sumo wrestlers
- List of past sumo wrestlers
- Glossary of sumo terms
