= Asashio Tarō III =

Japanese sumo wrestler

Asashio Tarō
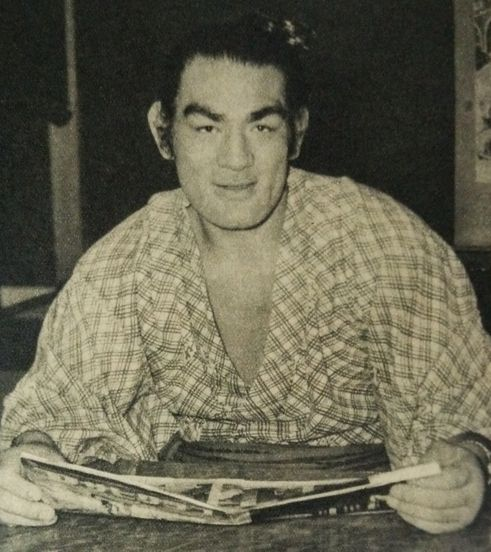
- Asashio in 1953

Personal information
- Native name: 朝潮 太郎
- Born: Fumitoshi Yonekawa; November 13, 1929 Tokunoshima, Amami Islands, Japan
- Died: October 23, 1988 (aged 58)
- Height: 1.88 m (6 ft 2 in)
- Weight: 135 kg (298 lb)

Sport
- Sport: Sumo
- Retired: January, 1962
- Heya: Takasago
- Record: 497-269-101
- Debut: October, 1948
- Highest rank: Yokozuna (March, 1959)
- Elder name: Takasago
- Championships: 5 (Makuuchi); 1 (Jūryō)
- Special Prizes: Outstanding Performance (4)
- Gold Stars: 7 Chiyonoyama (3); Haguroyama; Yoshibayama; Tochinishiki; Kagamisato
- Updated on June 2020

Asashio Tarō (Japanese: 朝潮 太郎; November 13, 1929 – October 23, 1988) was a Japanese professional sumo wrestler from Tokunoshima in the Amami Islands. He was the sport's 46th yokozuna. He was also a sumo coach and head of Takasago stable.

== Career ==
He was born Fumitoshi Yonekawa (米川 文敏) on Tokunoshima in the Amami Islands. Due to the Amami Islands being occupied by the United States, in 1948 he stowed away on a cargo ship and was supported by a relative in Hyogo Prefecture. Making his professional debut in October 1948, he at first fought under his real name. He was billed in sumo as being from Kobe in Hyogo until the United States returned the Amami Islands to Japan in 1953, and was thereafter billed as being from Kagoshima Prefecture.

In September 1950 he reached the second highest jūryō division and won the championship with a 14–1 record. This earned him immediate promotion to the top makuuchi division in January 1951. He adopted the shikona or ring name of Asashio Tarō in 1952. In his early career he earned seven kinboshi or gold stars for defeating yokozuna, three of them coming in one tournament in January 1955 when he beat Yoshibayama on Day 5 and then Chiyonoyama and Tochinishiki on Days 8 and 9. In January 1956 he changed the spelling of his ring name to 朝汐 太郎, but changed it back in July 1960.

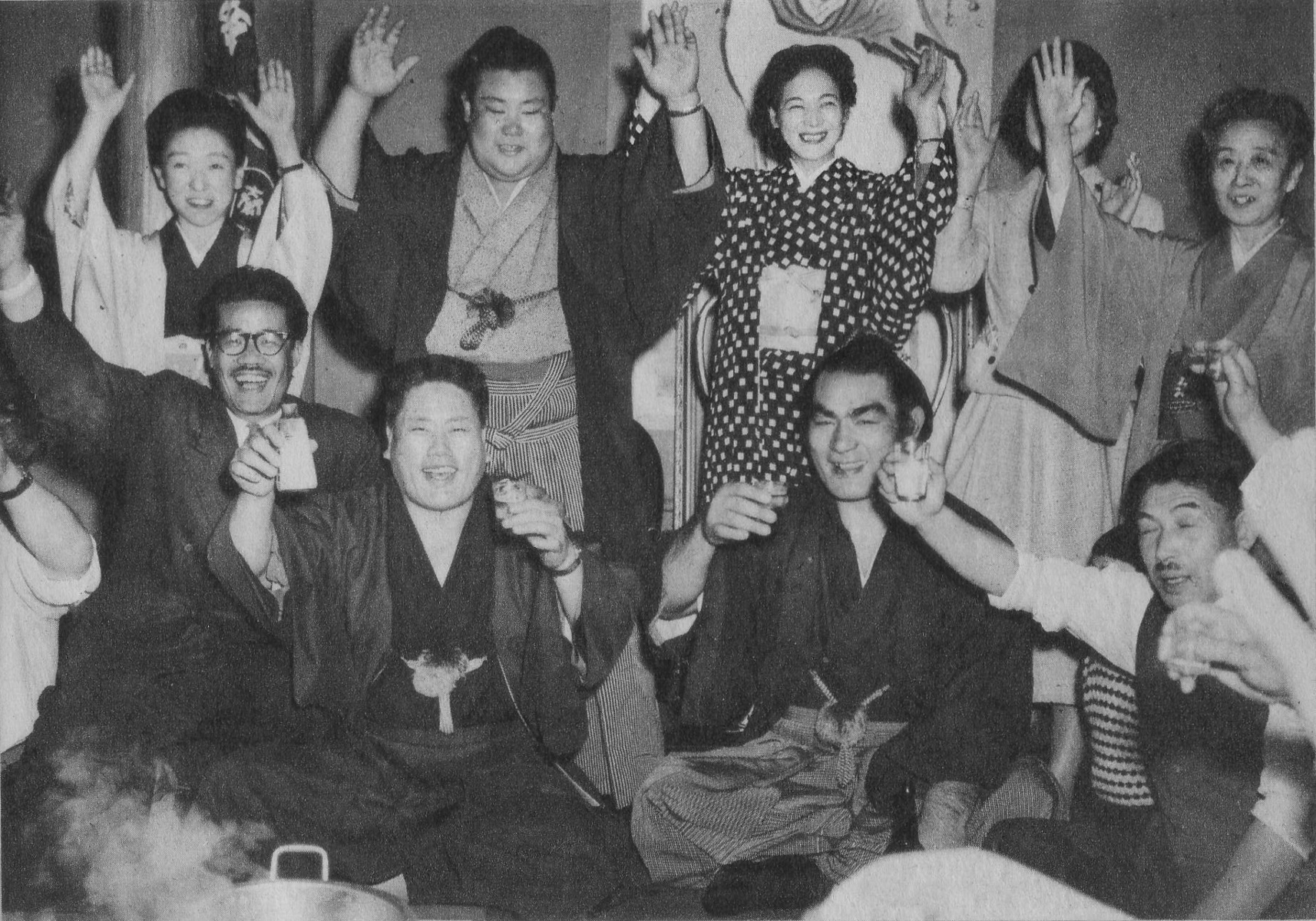
With coach Takasago celebrating Asashio's tournament win in March 1956

Asashio won five top division tournament championships, all but one of them in Osaka. He won this tournament three years in a row from 1956 to 1958. His first title was won at sekiwake rank in a three-way playoff, the first of its kind in makuuchi, defeating ōzeki Wakanohana Kanji I and maegashira Wakahaguro in succession. He himself would earned promotion to ōzeki a year later after winning his second championship. In November 1958 he won the tournament in Kyūshū with a 14–1 record. After runner-up honours in the next two tournaments he was finally promoted to yokozuna at nearly 30 years of age. His time at sumo's highest rank was difficult as he missed many bouts through injury. He had to sit out the three tournaments following his yokozuna debut and was only able to win one further tournament, in March 1961. He did not take part in the January 1962 tournament and announced his retirement at the age of 32.

Asashio was known for his thick chest hair and eyebrows. In 1959, he appeared on the cover of the first issue of Weekly Shōnen Magazine and in Hiroshi Inagaki's film The Three Treasures.

== Retirement from sumo ==
Asashio remained in the sumo world as an elder under the name of Furiwake, and became head coach of Takasago stable in 1971 after the death of the previous stablemaster, former yokozuna Maedayama. As Takasago-oyakata he coached Asashio Tarō IV and Konishiki to the rank of ōzeki. He predicted that Konishiki would reach the rank of yokozuna before his 25th birthday, but it did not happen. He also recruited the Samoan wrestler Nankairyū but after a heated argument with Takasago, Nankairyū ran away from the stable in September 1988. Takasago died of a stroke a few weeks later.

== Pre-modern top division record ==
- The New Year tournament began and the Spring tournament returned to Osaka in 1953.

Asashio Tarō
-	Spring Haru basho, Tokyo	Summer Natsu basho, Tokyo	Autumn Aki basho, Tokyo
1951	West Maegashira #20; 8–7	East Maegashira #19; 7–8	East Maegashira #20; 10–5
1952	East Maegashira #13; 10–5	East Maegashira #7; 8–7	West Maegashira #2; 10–5; O★★
Record given as wins–losses–absences Top division champion Top division runner-up Retired Lower divisions Non-participation Sanshō key: F=Fighting spirit; O=Outstanding performance; T=Technique Also shown: ★=Kinboshi; P=Playoff(s); Divisions: Makuuchi — Jūryō — Makushita — Sandanme — Jonidan — Jonokuchi Makuuchi ranks: Yokozuna — Ōzeki — Sekiwake — Komusubi — Maegashira

-	New Year Hatsu basho, Tokyo	Spring Haru basho, Osaka	Summer Natsu basho, Tokyo	Autumn Aki basho, Tokyo
1953	East Sekiwake #1; 11–4; O	East Sekiwake #1; 10–5	West Sekiwake #1; 8–7	East Sekiwake #1; 7–8
1954	West Komusubi #2; 8–7	East Komusubi #1; 8–7	West Komusubi #1; 8–7	East Komusubi #1; 6–9
1955	East Maegashira #1; 8–7; O★★★	East Maegashira #1; 10–5 ★★	East Komusubi #1; 8–7	West Komusubi #1; 9–6
1956	West Sekiwake #1; 9–6	East Sekiwake #1; 12–3–PP; O	East Sekiwake #1; 8–7	East Sekiwake #1; 8–7
Record given as wins–losses–absences Top division champion Top division runner-up Retired Lower divisions Non-participation Sanshō key: F=Fighting spirit; O=Outstanding performance; T=Technique Also shown: ★=Kinboshi; P=Playoff(s); Divisions: Makuuchi — Jūryō — Makushita — Sandanme — Jonidan — Jonokuchi Makuuchi ranks: Yokozuna — Ōzeki — Sekiwake — Komusubi — Maegashira

== Modern top division record ==
- Since the addition of the Kyushu tournament in 1957 and the Nagoya tournament in 1958, the yearly schedule has remained unchanged.

Year	January Hatsu basho, Tokyo	March Haru basho, Osaka	May Natsu basho, Tokyo	July Nagoya basho, Nagoya	September Aki basho, Tokyo	November Kyūshū basho, Fukuoka
1957	East Sekiwake #1; 8–7	West Sekiwake #1; 13–2	West Ōzeki #1; 9–6	Not held	West Ōzeki #1; 11–4	West Ōzeki #1; 10–5
1958	West Ōzeki #1; 10–5	East Ōzeki #1; 13–2–P	East Ōzeki #1; 5–4–6	West Ōzeki #1; 10–5	West Ōzeki #1; 11–4	West Ōzeki #1; 14–1
1959	East Ōzeki #1; 11–4	East Ōzeki #1; 13–2	West Yokozuna-Ōzeki #1; 10–5	East Yokozuna #2; Sat out due to injury 0–0–15	East Yokozuna #2; Sat out due to injury 0–0–15	East Yokozuna #2; Sat out due to injury 0–0–15
1960	East Yokozuna #2; 11–4	West Yokozuna #1; 4–6–5	East Yokozuna #2; 10–5	West Yokozuna; 9–6	West Yokozuna; 11–4	East Yokozuna; 11–4
1961	East Yokozuna #1; 9–6	West Yokozuna #1; 13–2	East Yokozuna #1; 0–4–11	West Yokozuna #1; 12–3	East Yokozuna #1; 0–4–11	West Yokozuna #2; 2–5–8
1962	West Yokozuna #2; Retired; 0–0	x	x	x	x	x
Record given as wins–losses–absences Top division champion Top division runner-up Retired Lower divisions Non-participation Sanshō key: F=Fighting spirit; O=Outstanding performance; T=Technique Also shown: ★=Kinboshi; P=Playoff(s); Divisions: Makuuchi — Jūryō — Makushita — Sandanme — Jonidan — Jonokuchi Makuuchi ranks: Yokozuna — Ōzeki — Sekiwake — Komusubi — Maegashira

== See also ==
- Glossary of sumo terms
- List of past sumo wrestlers
- List of sumo tournament top division champions
- List of sumo tournament top division runners-up
- List of sumo tournament second division champions
- List of yokozuna

Preceded by Wakanohana Kanji I	46th Yokozuna; 1959–1962	Succeeded by Kashiwado Tsuyoshi
Yokozuna is not a successive rank, and more than one wrestler can hold the title at once
