= Tochinishiki Kiyotaka =

Japanese sumo wrestler

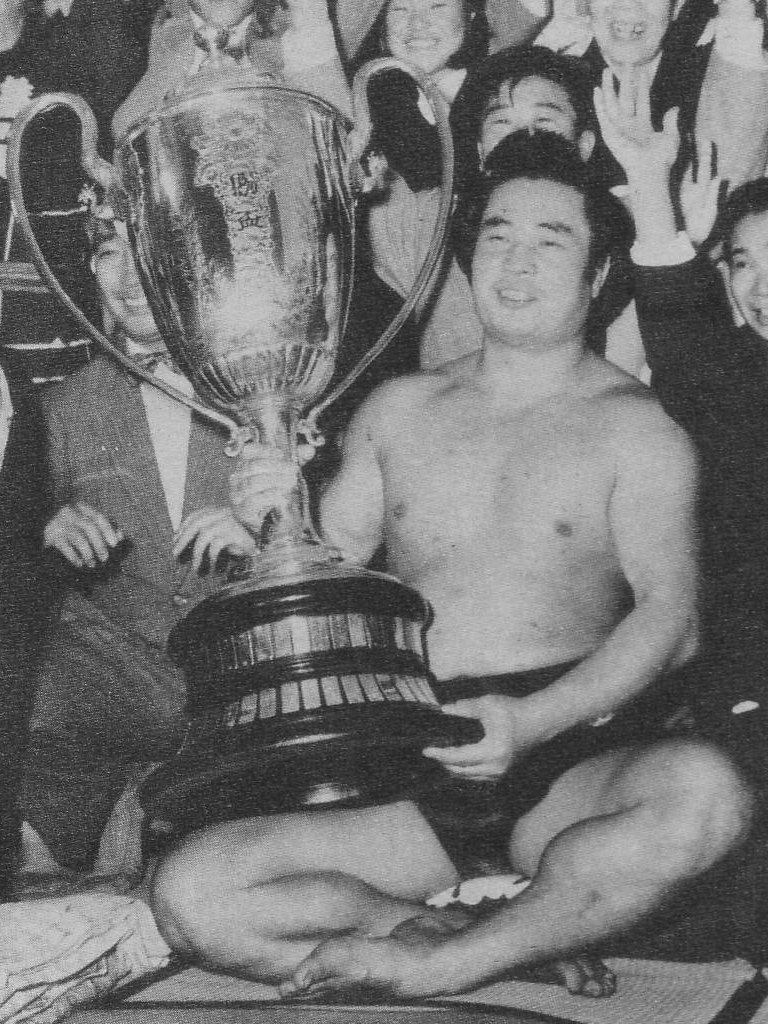
- Tochinishiki holding the Emperor's Cup after winning the September 1954 tournament

Personal information
- Native name: 栃錦 清隆
- Born: Ōtsuka Kiyoshi; February 20, 1925 Tokyo, Japan
- Died: January 10, 1990 (aged 64)
- Height: 1.77 m (5 ft 9 1/2 in)
- Weight: 132 kg (291 lb)

Sport
- Sport: Sumo
- Retired: May, 1960
- Heya: Kasugano
- Record: 576–244–32–1 draw
- Debut: January, 1939
- Highest rank: Yokozuna (October 1954)
- Elder name: Kasugano
- Championships: 10 (Makuuchi)
- Special Prizes: Outstanding Performance (1); Technique (9)
- Gold Stars: 1 (Azumafuji)
- Updated on June 2020

Tochinishiki Kiyotaka (Japanese: 栃錦 清隆; February 20, 1925 – January 10, 1990) was a Japanese professional sumo wrestler from Tokyo. He was the sport's 44th yokozuna. He won ten top division yūshō or tournament championships and was a rival of fellow yokozuna Wakanohana I. He became the head coach of Kasugano stable in 1959 and was head of the Japan Sumo Association from 1974 until 1988.

== Early career ==
Born Ōtsuka Kiyoshi (大塚 清), he later changed his name to Nakata Kiyoshi (中田 清). One of few yokozuna to hail from the city rather than the country, he was born in what is now Koiwa, Edogawa. He was a fine all round athlete in elementary school, and although he had no family connections to sumo, he was introduced by a shop owner to Kasugano Oyakata, the former yokozuna Tochigiyama. He made his professional debut in January 1939. He was of such small size that he had to drink copious amounts of water to meet the weight requirement at his physical exam. However, his stablemaster, to whom Tochinishiki served as an attendant or tsukebito and was a great influence on him in his early days, expected him to become strong. He began using the Tochinishiki shikona or ring name in May 1944.

== Top division career and yokozuna career ==
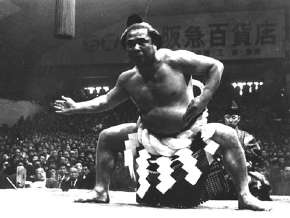
Tochinishiki performing his yokozuna dohyō-iri, September 1954

Tochinishiki reached the top makuuchi division in June 1947. He made up for his lack of size by showing superb technique. He won no fewer than nine special prizes for Technique, and it was even suggested that the prize had been created especially for him. Tochinishiki was known as the Mamushi (Viper) due to his tenacity once he grabbed hold of his opponent's mawashi.

In January 1951, he lost 7 consecutive bouts, but bounced back to win eight in a row and clinched his majority of wins or kachi-koshi on the final day, despite the bout being interrupted by a drunken spectator. After this performance, Tochinishiki began to raise his rank on the banzuke rapidly, taking his first top division championship in September 1952 and earning promotion to ōzeki. He finally reached yokozuna in October 1954 after winning two successive championships. There had been four yokozuna in the September 1954 tournament, Kagamisato, Chiyonoyama, Yoshibayama and Azumafuji, but Azumafuji announced his retirement so as not to hinder Tochinishiki's promotion.

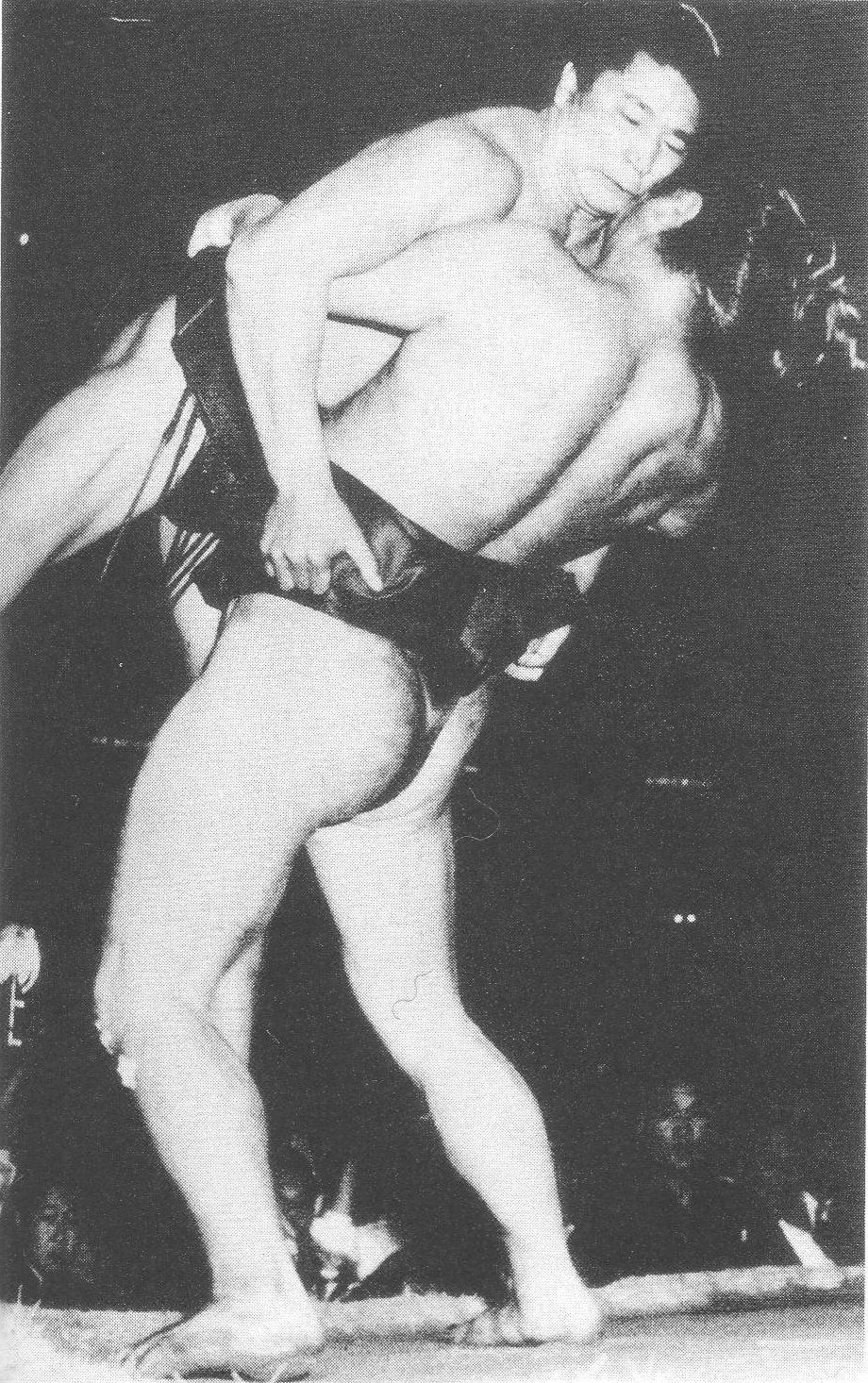
Tochinishiki (right) defeating his rival Wakanohana I, summer 1954

When Tochinishiki was promoted to yokozuna, he expected that his stablemaster Tochigiyama would commend him. However, his stablemaster told him, "From this day on, you should spend every day of your yokozuna life by thinking about the day you retire." He proceeded to mark his first bout as yokozuna by giving away a kinboshi to Ōnobori.

At first, he struggled somewhat against heavier wrestlers, but he raised his weight to around 130 kg and became a wrestler able to use more orthodox methods. Between March 1959 and March 1960, he won 95 bouts and lost only 10.

Tochinishiki had a great rivalry with yokozuna Wakanohana Kanji I, who reached the top rank in January 1958. They were of a similar build, and each won ten top division tournament championships in their careers, with Tochinishiki coming out slightly ahead in their personal meetings with 19 wins out of 35 bouts. In July 1959 he defeated Wakanohana on the final day and won the championship with a perfect 15–0 score despite the fact that his father had been fatally hit by a truck the previous day. In October 1959 his stablemaster died suddenly and Tochinishiki became head coach of Kasugano stable whilst still an active wrestler (a practice no longer permitted). After losing to Wakanohana in a championship-deciding match on the final day of the March 1960 tournament, he decided to retire from active competition two days into the following tournament.

== Later life ==
In addition to his position as stable boss, Tochinishiki was also the chairman (rijichō) of the Japan Sumo Association from 1974 to 1988, making him the longest serving chairman to date. Under his direction the new Ryōgoku Kokugikan was built in 1985. Suffering from diabetes, he stood down voluntarily, allowing his old rival Wakanohana to ascend to the position. During his tenure as head of the Association, in 1985, Tochinishiki performed his kanreki dohyō-iri or '60th year ring entrance ceremony' to commemorate his years as yokozuna. He died in January 1990, following a stroke. He had been due to retire from the Sumo Association the following month when he would have turned 65 years old.

== Pre-Modern Top division record ==
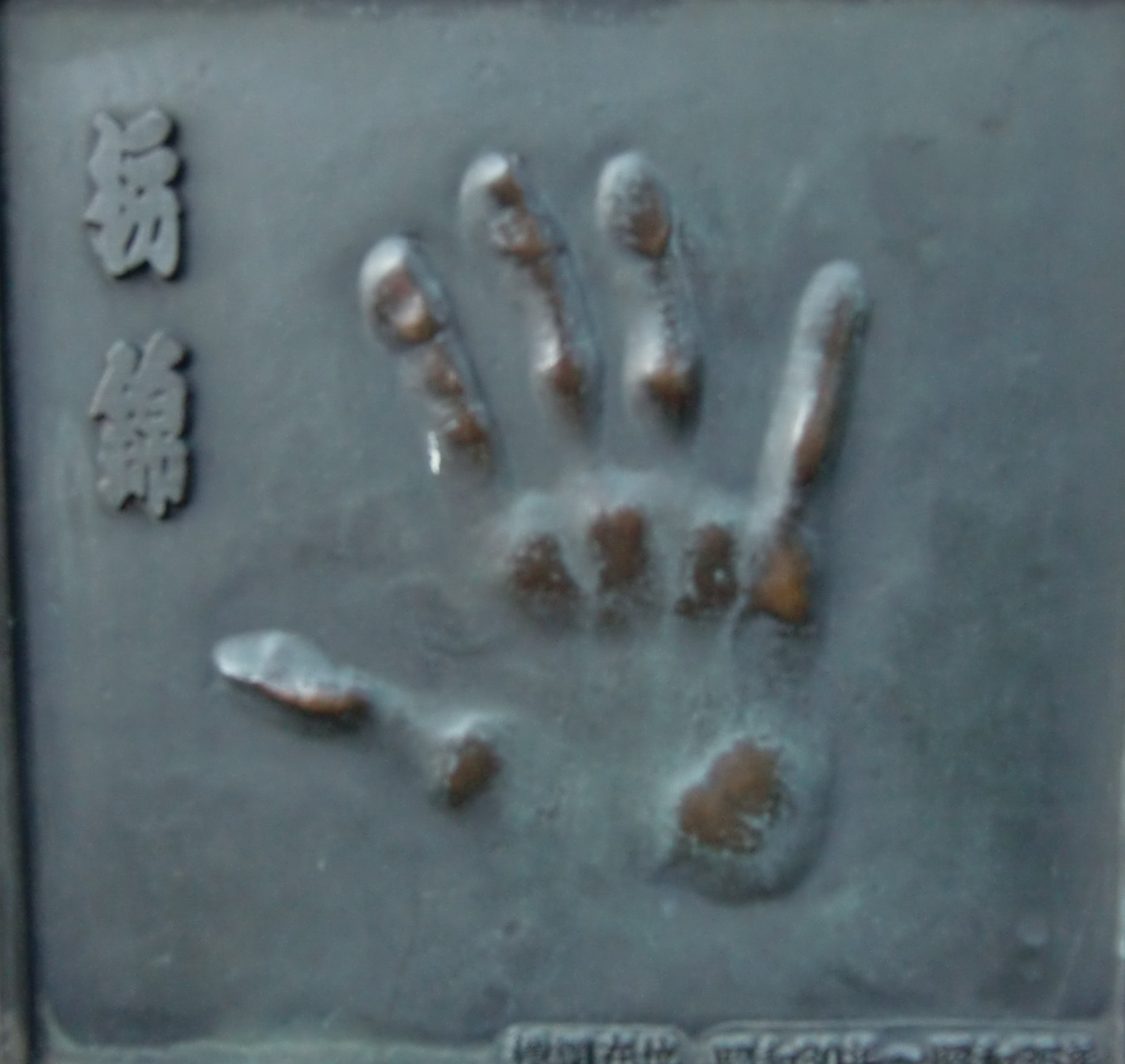
Tochinishiki's handprint displayed on a monument in Ryōgoku, Tokyo

- Through most of the 1940s only two tournaments were held a year. In 1953 the New Year tournament began and the Spring tournament resumed in Osaka.

Tochinishiki Kiyotaka
| - | Spring Haru basho, Tokyo | Summer Natsu basho, Tokyo | Autumn Aki basho, Tokyo |
|---|---|---|---|
| 1947 | Not held | West Maegashira #18; 4–6 | West Maegashira #16; 9–2 |
| 1948 | Not held | West Maegashira #8; 5–5–1draw | West Maegashira #7; 7–4 |
| 1949 | West Maegashira #3; 7–6; T | West Maegashira #3; 4–11 | West Maegashira #7; 12–3; T |
| 1950 | West Komusubi #2; 8–7; T | East Komusubi #1; 5–10 | East Maegashira #3; 8–7; T★ |
| 1951 | East Maegashira #2; 8–7 | East Komusubi #1; 9–6; T | West Sekiwake #1; 9–6; T |
| 1952 | East Sekiwake #2; 10–5; TO | East Sekiwake #1; 10–5; T | West Sekiwake #1; 14–1; T |
Record given as wins–losses–absences Top division champion Top division runner-up Retired Lower divisions Non-participation Sanshō key: F=Fighting spirit; O=Outstanding performance; T=Technique Also shown: ★=Kinboshi; P=Playoff(s); Divisions: Makuuchi — Jūryō — Makushita — Sandanme — Jonidan — Jonokuchi Makuuchi ranks: Yokozuna — Ōzeki — Sekiwake — Komusubi — Maegashira

| - | New Year Hatsu basho, Tokyo | Spring Haru basho, Osaka | Summer Natsu basho, Tokyo | Autumn Aki basho, Tokyo |
|---|---|---|---|---|
| 1953 | East Ōzeki #2; 11–4 | East Ōzeki #1; 14–1 | East Ōzeki #1; 13–2 | West Ōzeki #1; 8–7 |
| 1954 | West Ōzeki #1; 9–6 | West Ōzeki #1; 9–6 | West Ōzeki #1; 14–1 | East Ōzeki #1; 14–1 |
| 1955 | West Yokozuna #1; 10–5 | West Yokozuna #1; 12–3 | West Yokozuna #1; 14–1 | East Yokozuna #1; 4–3–8 |
| 1956 | West Yokozuna #2; 9–6 | East Yokozuna #2; 9–6 | West Yokozuna #1; 5–5–5 | West Yokozuna #2; 11–4 |
Record given as wins–losses–absences Top division champion Top division runner-up Retired Lower divisions Non-participation Sanshō key: F=Fighting spirit; O=Outstanding performance; T=Technique Also shown: ★=Kinboshi; P=Playoff(s); Divisions: Makuuchi — Jūryō — Makushita — Sandanme — Jonidan — Jonokuchi Makuuchi ranks: Yokozuna — Ōzeki — Sekiwake — Komusubi — Maegashira

== Modern top division record ==
- Since the addition of the Kyushu tournament in 1957 and the Nagoya tournament in 1958, the yearly schedule has remained unchanged.

| Year | January Hatsu basho, Tokyo | March Haru basho, Osaka | May Natsu basho, Tokyo | July Nagoya basho, Nagoya | September Aki basho, Tokyo | November Kyūshū basho, Fukuoka |
|---|---|---|---|---|---|---|
| 1957 | East Yokozuna #2; 11–4 | West Yokozuna #1; 11–4 | East Yokozuna #1; 12–3 | Not held | East Yokozuna #1; 13–2 | East Yokozuna #1; 12–3 |
| 1958 | East Yokozuna #1; 11–4 | West Yokozuna #1; 11–4 | East Yokozuna #2; 14–1 | East Yokozuna #1; 12–3 | West Yokozuna #1; 6–5–4 | West Yokozuna #1; Sat out due to injury 0–0–15 |
| 1959 | West Yokozuna #1; 10–5 | West Yokozuna #1; 14–1 | East Yokozuna #1; 14–1–P | East Yokozuna #1; 15–0 | East Yokozuna #1; 12–3 | West Yokozuna #1; 12–3 |
| 1960 | East Yokozuna #1; 14–1 | East Yokozuna #1; 14–1 | West Yokozuna #1; Retired; 0–3 | x | x | x |
Record given as wins–losses–absences Top division champion Top division runner-up Retired Lower divisions Non-participation Sanshō key: F=Fighting spirit; O=Outstanding performance; T=Technique Also shown: ★=Kinboshi; P=Playoff(s); Divisions: Makuuchi — Jūryō — Makushita — Sandanme — Jonidan — Jonokuchi Makuuchi ranks: Yokozuna — Ōzeki — Sekiwake — Komusubi — Maegashira

== See also ==
- Glossary of sumo terms
- Kanreki dohyo-iri
- List of past sumo wrestlers
- List of sumo tournament top division champions
- List of sumo tournament top division runners-up
- List of yokozuna

| Preceded by Yoshibayama Junnosuke | 44th Yokozuna; 1954–1960 | Succeeded by Wakanohana Kanji I |
Yokozuna is not a successive rank, and more than one wrestler can hold the title at once

Sporting positions
| Preceded by Dewanohana Kuniichi | Chairman of the Japan Sumo Association; 1974–1988 | Succeeded by Wakanohana Kanji I |
