= Maedayama Eigorō =

Japanese sumo wrestler

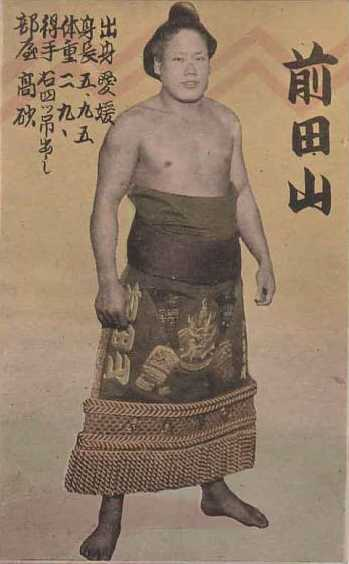

Personal information
- Native name: 前田山 英五郎
- Born: Hagimori Kanematsu; May 4, 1914 Ehime, Japan
- Died: August 17, 1971 (aged 57)
- Height: 1.80 m (5 ft 11 in)
- Weight: 116.5 kg (257 lb)

Sport
- Sport: Sumo
- Retired: October, 1949
- Heya: Takasago
- Record: 306–153–39
- Debut: January 1929
- Highest rank: Yokozuna (June 1947)
- Elder name: Takasago
- Championships: 1 (Makuuchi); 1 (Jūryō); 1 (Makushita)
- Updated on June 2020

Maedayama Eigorō (Japanese: 前田山 英五郎; May 4, 1914 – August 17, 1971) was a Japanese professional sumo wrestler from Ehime Prefecture. He was the sport's 39th yokozuna.

== Career ==
He was born Hagimori Kanematsu (萩森 金松) in Nishiuwa District. On his school excursion to Ōita in the spring of 1926, he met future yokozuna Futabayama Sadaji, who had not yet joined Tatsunami stable, and was participating in the track meet. After joining Takasago stable in the autumn of 1927, he met Futabayama again. Subsequently, he and Futabayama practiced together regularly after he entered sumo.

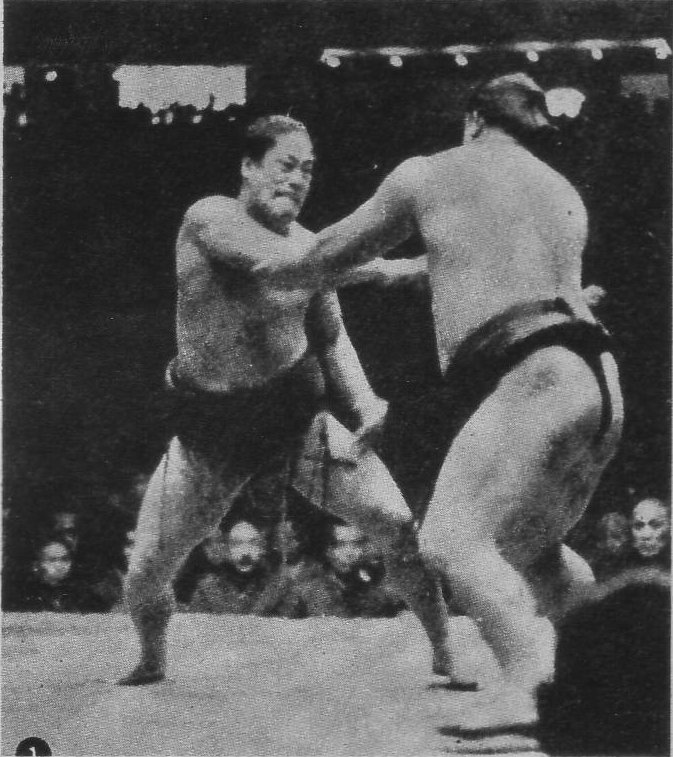
Maedayama defeats Futabayama in January 1941.

He made his professional debut in January 1929 using the shikona or ring name Yoshigiyama (喜木山), before changing it to Sadamisaki Eigorō (佐田岬 英五郎) in May 1930. In January 1935 he changed its surname to Maedayama in honour of the surgeon who saved his career after he was forced to sit out the whole of 1934 due to injury.

Maedayama reached the top makuuchi division in January 1937. In May 1938, he was promoted to ōzeki, straight from the fourth komusubi rank, after finishing as tournament runner-up. It was the quickest rise to ōzeki since Ōnishiki in 1916. In January 1941, he defeated ōzeki Haguroyama and yokozuna Futabayama. His strongest technique was harite, or face slap. His technique caused a controversy over harite but Futabayama supported him, insisting it was a legitimate sumo technique.

Maedayama was an ōzeki during the war years, when few tournaments were held, and took his only top division championship in the autumn of 1944, with a 9–1 record. He was promoted to yokozuna in June 1947 after taking part in a three way play-off that also included fellow ōzeki Azumafuji and yokozuna Haguroyama. He was thirty-three years old at the time of his promotion and in his short yokozuna career he was unable to win any further tournament championships, only managing to produce two winning scores. Always a temperamental and controversial figure, he was forced to retire by the Japan Sumo Association in October 1949 after dropping out of a tournament claiming illness, only to be subsequently photographed at a baseball game with Lefty O'Doul.

== Retirement from sumo ==
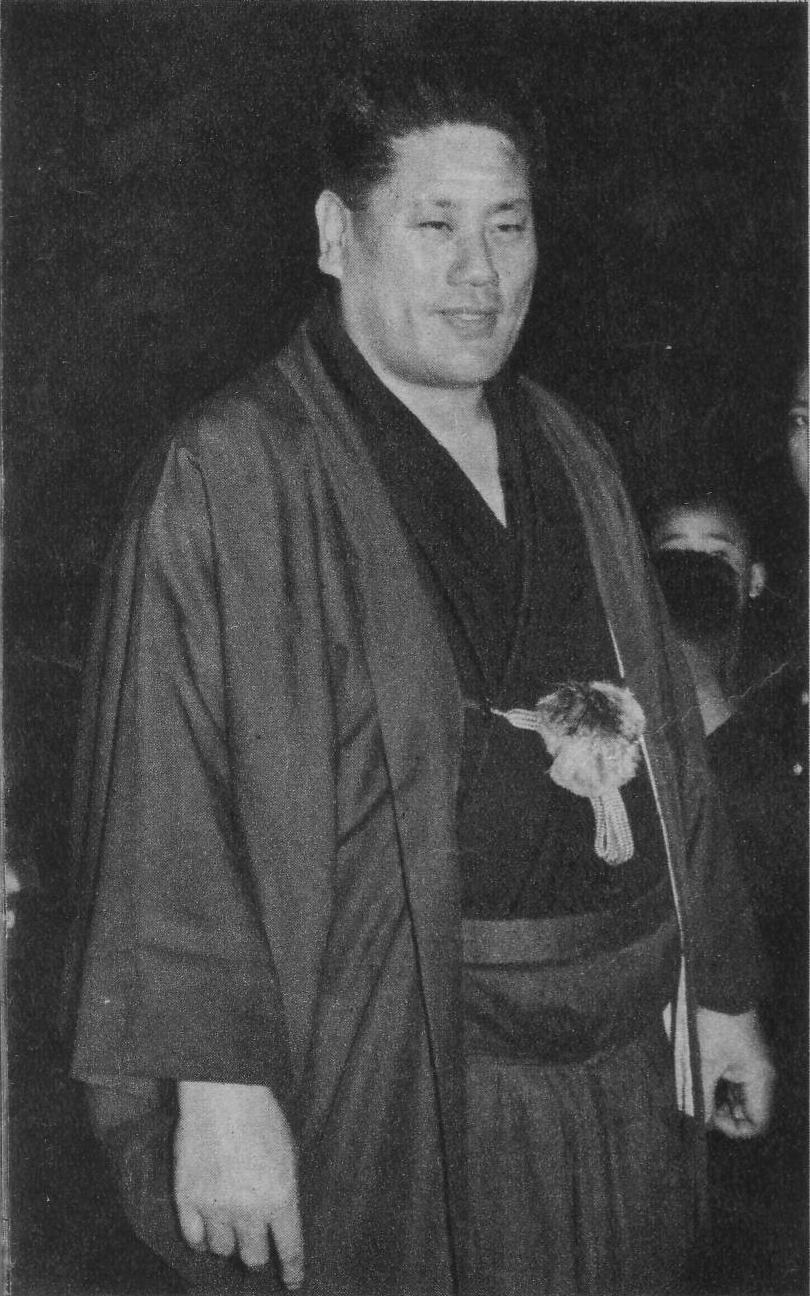
As Takasago Oyakata in 1956

Maedayama had become head coach of Takasago stable in 1941 while still active in the ring (a practice no longer permitted) and upon his retirement he formally adopted the name Takasago Oyakata. In 1964 he recruited Takamiyama from Hawaii, the first foreigner to succeed in professional sumo. He went on an extended tour of the United States to promote sumo, without the permission of the Sumo Association's directors. He produced yokozuna Asashio Tarō III in 1959 and ōzeki Maenoyama Tarō in 1970. In 1967 he allowed Chiyonoyama's Kokonoe stable into his faction, strengthening the Takasago ichimon (group of stables). He became calmer late in his life and died on August 17, 1971, of cirrhosis of the liver, too early to see Takamiyama become the first foreigner to win a championship in 1972. After his death, foreigners such as ōzeki Konishiki and yokozuna Asashōryū joined his stable.

== Career record ==
Maedayama Eigorō
-	Spring Haru basho, Tokyo	March Sangatsu basho, varied	Summer Natsu basho, Tokyo	October Jūgatsu basho, varied
1929	(Maezumo)	(Maezumo)	East Jonokuchi #15; 3–3	East Jonokuchi #15; 4–2
1930	East Jonidan #29; 3–3	East Jonidan #29; 2–4	East Jonidan #29; 5–1	East Jonidan #29; 5–1
1931	East Sandanme #20; 1–5	East Sandanme #20; 3–3	West Sandanme #33; 5–1	West Sandanme #33; 5–1
1932	East Makushita #17; 5–3	East Makushita #17; 5–5	East Makushita #7; Sat out due to injury 0–0–11	East Makushita #7; 7–3–1
Record given as wins–losses–absences Top division champion Top division runner-up Retired Lower divisions Non-participation Sanshō key: F=Fighting spirit; O=Outstanding performance; T=Technique Also shown: ★=Kinboshi; P=Playoff(s); Divisions: Makuuchi — Jūryō — Makushita — Sandanme — Jonidan — Jonokuchi Makuuchi ranks: Yokozuna — Ōzeki — Sekiwake — Komusubi — Maegashira

- Through most of the 1930s and 1940s only two tournaments were held a year, and in 1946 only one was held.

-	Spring Haru basho, Tokyo	Summer Natsu basho, Tokyo	Autumn Aki basho, Tokyo
1933	West Makushita #14; 7–4	West Makushita #3; 7–4	Not held
1934	West Jūryō #9; 0–0–11	East Makushita #7; 0–0–11	Not held
1935	West Sandanme #5; 5–1	East Makushita #14; 10–1; Champion	Not held
1936	East Jūryō #12; 8–3	West Jūryō #4; 10–1; Champion	Not held
1937	East Maegashira #12; 7–4	East Maegashira #5; 9–4	Not held
1938	East Komusubi #1; 11–2	East Ōzeki #1; 8–5	Not held
1939	East Ōzeki #1; 9–4	East Ōzeki #1; 10–5	Not held
1940	West Ōzeki #1; 10–5	West Ōzeki #1; 11–4	Not held
1941	East Ōzeki #2; 12–3	East Ōzeki #2; 10–5	Not held
1942	West Ōzeki; 2–3–10	East Ōzeki; 11–4	Not held
1943	West Ōzeki #1; 11–4	East Ōzeki #1; 9–6	Not held
1944	West Ōzeki #1; 9–6	West Ōzeki #1; 8–2	West Ōzeki #1; 9–1
1945	Not held	East Ōzeki #1; 1–2–4	East Ōzeki #2; 5–5
1946	Not held	Not held	East Ōzeki #2; 11–2
1947	Not held	West Ōzeki #1; 9–1–PP	West Yokozuna #2; 6–5
1948	Not held	East Yokozuna #2; 0–1–10	East Yokozuna #2; 3–6–2
1949	East Yokozuna #2; 5–3–5	West Yokozuna #1; 9–6	East Yokozuna #2; Retired; 1–6–8
Record given as win-loss-absent Top Division Champion Top Division Runner-up Retired Lower Divisions Key: ★=Kinboshi(s); d=Draw(s) (引分); h=Hold(s) (預り); Divisions: Makuuchi — Jūryō — Makushita — Sandanme — Jonidan — Jonokuchi Makuuchi ranks: Yokozuna — Ōzeki — Sekiwake — Komusubi — Maegashira

== See also ==
- Glossary of sumo terms
- List of past sumo wrestlers
- List of sumo tournament top division champions
- List of yokozuna

Preceded by Terukuni Manzō	39th Yokozuna; 1947–1949	Succeeded by Azumafuji Kin'ichi
Yokozuna is not a successive rank, and more than one wrestler can hold the title at once
