= Asashio Tarō IV =

Japanese sumo wrestler (1955–2023)

Asashio Tarō
Personal information
- Native name: 朝潮 太郎
- Born: Suehiro Nagaoka; 9 December 1955 Kōchi, Japan
- Died: 2 November 2023 (aged 67)
- Height: 1.82 m (6 ft 0 in)
- Weight: 175 kg (386 lb)

Sport
- Sport: Sumo
- University team: Kindai University
- Retired: March 1989
- Heya: Takasago
- Record: 564-382-33
- Debut: March 1978
- Highest rank: Ōzeki (May 1983)
- Elder name: Takasago
- Championships: 1 (Makuuchi); 1 (Makushita)
- Special Prizes: Outstanding Performance (10); Fighting Spirit (3); Technique (1)
- Gold Stars: 5 Kitanoumi (4); Wajima
- Updated on November 2020

Asashio Tarō (Japanese: 朝潮 太郎; born Suehiro Nagaoka (長岡 末弘); 9 December 1955 – 2 November 2023) was a Japanese sumo wrestler from Muroto, Kōchi, Japan. His highest rank was ōzeki. A former amateur champion, he turned professional in 1978. He won one top division tournament championship and was a runner-up on four other occasions. He won fourteen special prizes, including a record ten Outstanding Performance Awards, and five gold stars for defeating yokozuna. He retired in 1989 and became head coach of the Wakamatsu stable, which in 2002 merged with Takasago stable. As a coach, he raised yokozuna Asashōryū and ōzeki Asanoyama. He stood down as an elder in 2020.

== Career ==
Joining Takasago stable in March 1978 after a successful amateur sumo career at Kinki University, he began his professional career in the third highest makushita division, and was promoted to the top makuuchi division in November 1978. He initially competed under his own surname, Nagaoka, but in March 1979 he was given the shikona of Asashio (or "morning tide"), which had previously been used by several past greats in Takasago stable, including his own stablemaster. Asashio was promoted to komusubi in May 1980 and sekiwake in July 1980. In November 1981 he lost a playoff for the tournament championship to new yokozuna Chiyonofuji. He was runner-up to Chiyonofuji once again in May 1982 and to Kotokaze in January 1983.

After accumulating a record ten Shukun-shō, or Outstanding Performance prizes for his achievements in tournaments, he was promoted to sumo's second highest rank of ōzeki in May 1983. Having lost three top division championship playoffs in his career, he finally took his only tournament championship in March 1985 with a 13–2 record. After that he was rarely a threat in tournaments, usually posting only eight or nine wins. He retained his rank until March 1989, when after a poor start to the tournament he announced his retirement from the ring at the age of thirty-three.

== Fighting style ==
Asashio was fond of tsuki/oshi (thrusting and pushing) techniques, winning many bouts by oshi-dashi (push out) and hataki-komi (slap down). However, he was also well capable of fighting on the mawashi, preferring a right hand outside, left hand inside grip (hidari-yotsu), and overall yori-kiri (force out) was his most regularly used kimarite. He rarely employed throws.

== After retirement ==
=== Head of Takasago stable ===
Asashio remained in the sumo world as an oyakata, or elder, and became the head coach of Wakamatsu stable in March 1990, taking over from former sekiwake Fusanishiki who resigned because of ill-health. In the 1990s he coached Asanowaka and Asanosho, both like himself former college champions, to the top division. He then had even greater success with the Mongolian star Asashōryū, coaching him all the way to yokozuna. In 2002 Wakamatsu stable merged with Takasago stable and Asashio became head coach there. From February 2000 until February 2008 he was also a Director of the Japan Sumo Association. He was in charge of the Public Relations department, but left his post after the controversy over Asashōryū's suspension in August 2007. Takasago was seemingly unable to control his most senior wrestler, often unaware of whether Asashōryū was in Japan or back in Mongolia, and this damaged his standing within the Sumo Association. In February 2009 he became head of the judging department, replacing Takanohana. In January 2010 he was severely reprimanded by the Board of Directors after Asashōryū allegedly punched an acquaintance while on a drunken night out during a honbasho. With Asashōryū retiring shortly afterwards, Takasago now had just one top division wrestler, Asasekiryū. He left the judging department after the February 2010 elections, and was demoted in the Sumo Association's hierarchy. As of 2017 he is the deputy chairman of the competition inspection committee.

=== Resignation and death ===
In 2020 he oversaw the promotion of Asanoyama to ōzeki. He stood down as head coach in November 2020, passing on control of Takasago stable to the former Asasekiryū. He swapped elder names, becoming Nishikijima Oyakata, and planned to stay in the Sumo Association under that name for a further five years as a consultant. However, he submitted his resignation in June 2021 after the Sumo Association's compliance committee, during their investigation into Asanoyama for violation of COVID protocols, found that Nishikijima himself violated those protocols by inviting Asanoyama for dinner and drinks with his family and acquaintances at a time when wrestlers were prohibited from making non-essential outings.

On 3 November 2023 the Japan Sumo Association announced the death of Asashio IV. He died from small intestine cancer on 2 November, at the age of 67.

== Career record ==
Asashio Tarō
Year	January Hatsu basho, Tokyo	March Haru basho, Osaka	May Natsu basho, Tokyo	July Nagoya basho, Nagoya	September Aki basho, Tokyo	November Kyūshū basho, Fukuoka
1978	x	Makushita tsukedashi #60; 7–0; Champion	West Makushita #6; 6–1	West Jūryō #13; 10–5–PP	East Jūryō #5; 10–5	West Maegashira #13; 9–6
1979	East Maegashira #6; 10–5; F	East Maegashira #1; 5–10	East Maegashira #6; 6–9	East Maegashira #10; 6–9	East Maegashira #14; 10–5; F	West Maegashira #6; 7–8
1980	East Maegashira #7; 8–7	West Maegashira #2; 10–5; O★	East Komusubi #1; 10–5; O	West Sekiwake #1; 11–4; O	East Sekiwake #1; 6–9	West Maegashira #2; 7–8
1981	East Maegashira #3; 8–7 ★★	East Maegashira #1; 8–7	West Komusubi #1; 9–6; O	East Sekiwake #2; 11–4; O	West Sekiwake #1; 7–8	West Komusubi #2; 12–3–P; O
1982	West Sekiwake #1; 6–9	West Maegashira #1; 8–7 ★	West Komusubi #1; 13–2–P; OF	West Sekiwake #1; 8–7; O	West Sekiwake #2; 7–8	East Maegashira #1; 9–6 ★
1983	West Sekiwake #1; 14–1–P; OT	East Sekiwake #1; 12–3; O	East Ōzeki #2; 9–6	East Ōzeki #3; 9–6	West Ōzeki #2; 6–3–6	West Ōzeki #2; Sat out due to injury 0–0–15
1984	West Ōzeki #2; 10–5	East Ōzeki #2; 9–6	West Ōzeki #2; 10–5	West Ōzeki #1; 8–7	East Ōzeki #2; 11–4	West Ōzeki #1; 10–5
1985	West Ōzeki #1; 9–6	East Ōzeki #2; 13–2	East Ōzeki #1; 11–4	East Ōzeki #1; 9–6	East Ōzeki #2; 9–6	East Ōzeki #2; 9–6
1986	West Ōzeki #2; 9–6	East Ōzeki #2; 10–5	West Ōzeki #1; 9–6	East Ōzeki #2; 9–6	East Ōzeki #2; 9–6	West Ōzeki #1; 8–7
1987	West Ōzeki #2; 9–6	West Ōzeki #2; 9–6	East Ōzeki #2; 8–7	East Ōzeki #2; 9–6	East Ōzeki #2; 8–7	East Ōzeki #2; 8–7
1988	West Ōzeki #2; 9–6	West Ōzeki #2; 8–7	West Ōzeki #2; 1–2–12	West Ōzeki #2; 8–7	West Ōzeki #2; 9–6	West Ōzeki #1; 4–11
1989	West Ōzeki #2; 8–7	East Ōzeki #2; Retired; 0–5	x	x	x	x
Record given as wins–losses–absences Top division champion Top division runner-up Retired Lower divisions Non-participation Sanshō key: F=Fighting spirit; O=Outstanding performance; T=Technique Also shown: ★=Kinboshi; P=Playoff(s); Divisions: Makuuchi — Jūryō — Makushita — Sandanme — Jonidan — Jonokuchi Makuuchi ranks: Yokozuna — Ōzeki — Sekiwake — Komusubi — Maegashira

== See also ==
- Glossary of sumo terms
- List of sumo tournament top division champions
- List of sumo tournament top division runners-up
- List of past sumo wrestlers
- List of sumo elders
- List of ōzeki
