= Ichimon (sumo) =

Training places in professional sumo

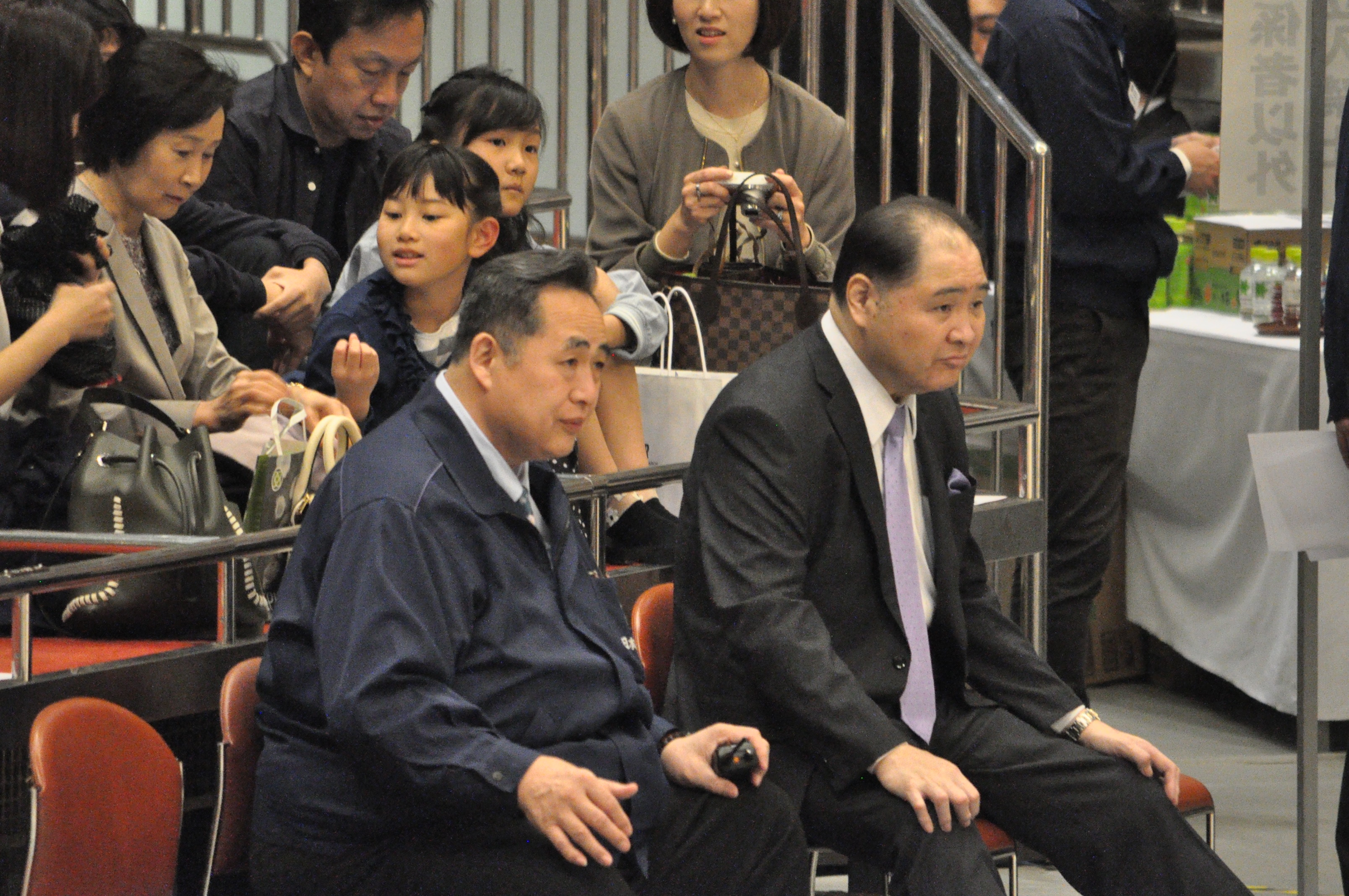
Shibatayama (former yokozuna Ōnokuni), left, and Oguruma (former ōzeki Kotokaze), right. The two wrestlers were raised within the Nishonoseki ichimon and continued their collaboration within the clan during their coaching careers.

In professional sumo wrestling, an ichimon (一門; lit. 'clan' or 'family') is a grouping of stables. Because of their specific nature, clans are also sometimes referred to as the sports equivalent of a traditional family or a commonwealth. Every stable must be affiliated to one of the five existing clans.

In the past, the clans were close-knit, but this bond has weakened with time and the reforms of professional sumo. Nowadays clans serve primarily as political factions. Elders' ambition has also caused some clans to splinter, turning a cohesive landscape into a fragmented one. Of the clans founded during the Edo period, none remain today. Of the five current clans, not all enjoy the same aura or influence within the association. For example, the Dewanoumi and Nishonoseki clans each have more influence than the three smallest clans (Tokitsukaze, Isegahama and Takasago) combined. The powers of the various clans have also evolved with the association itself.

== Origin and evolutions ==
As in other traditional disciplines such as Noh or Shogi, where players belong to schools which in turn belong to larger groups of traditions, heya belong to groups formed throughout the history of sumo.

Although the term ichimon did not appear until the Shōwa era, the system itself dates back to the Edo period. Originally, ichimons were called kumiai (組合; union), with the meaning of an "itinerant group". Before the Shōwa era, the operation of professional sumo revolved around these independent groups under the patronage of the sumo association. Without earned wages, wrestlers belonging to the stables of a particular union were largely dependent on the income from tours organized by the said union. These tours were organized by the unions themselves, and there was no association-wide tour system. In those days, the clan chief distributed the winnings from the tours to the stables according to their contribution. At the start of the Meiji era, professional sumo went through a period of disfavor and many stables continued to exist without having the means to invest in training grounds. The system of grouping into clans allowed these stables to mutualize training possibilities. In 1909, out of forty-seven stables, only eleven had a training ground.

The clan system became even more important at the end of the Taishō era. At the time, professional sumo was shaken by social movements and the tournament system, where wrestlers competed according to banzuke (sumo ranking sheet) divisions (east or west) and were forbidden to face wrestlers from the same division, offered little diversity in the matches. In 1932, the last major wrestlers' strike in history broke out with the Shunjuen Incident. That movement called for fundamental reform within the newly created Japan Sumo Association. Following the resignation of a significant number of wrestlers, the association acceded to a number of their demands and created the clan competition system, allowing more wrestlers to compete against each other in matches, the only restriction being that wrestlers from the same clan couldn't compete against each other. However, this system favoured the largest clans. Following political pressure to reform the association in 1957, the clan competition system was abolished to introduce a round-robin tournament system then replaced by the current system, based on stables, that was adopted in 1965. Because of the traditional construction of professional sumo, the clan system was able to survive because the modern factions had been built on the basis of personal relationships between the masters and the students.

Following the Takanoiwa affair and the dissolution of the Takanohana ichimon in 2018, the total number of clans in the Sumo Association was fixed to five and it was made mandatory for all stables to choose which clan to join, putting an end to the loose system and the autonomy of stables in their choice of alignments.

== Current ichimon ==
=== Dewanoumi ichimon ===
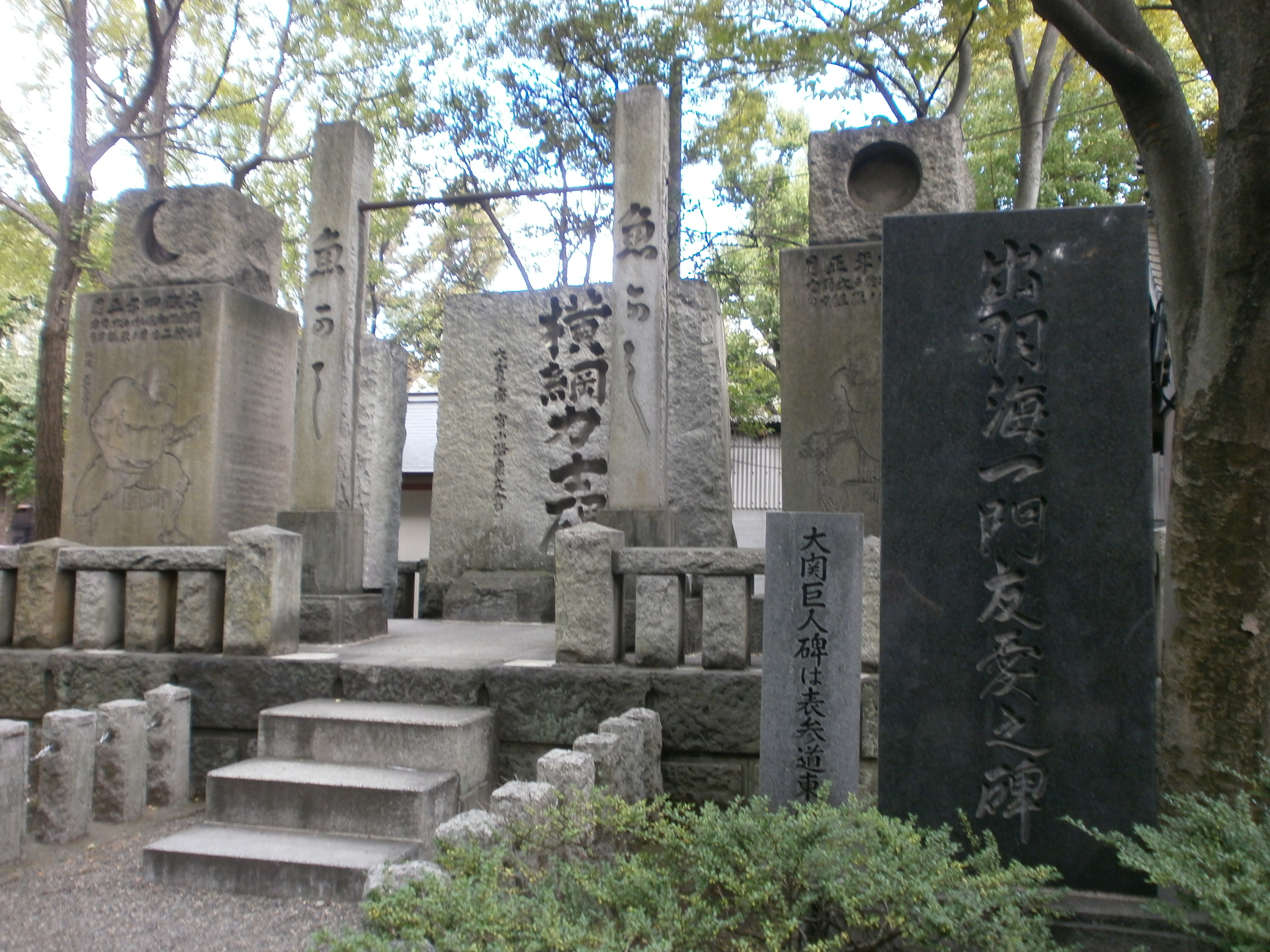
The Dewanoumi ichimon has erected a memorial stone (in black stone, on the right) next to the yokozuna monument at the Tomioka Hachiman Shrine.

The Dewanoumi ichimon (出羽海一門), known as a conservative movement in professional sumo, also enjoys a reputation as a pillar of the association's history. The clan is the second oldest in professional sumo. In its history, six of the twelve chairmen from the wrestlers' ranks came from this clan.

Led by prominent figures in the sport such as former yokozuna Hitachiyama, this clan had a policy of centralization, not allowing any oyakata to become independent of the stable until Tochigiyama's independence in 1925. This policy came to an end in 1981, when the former Mienoumi established Musashigawa stable. He became the first oyakata to become independent of Dewanoumi stable in 14 years, the first since the expulsion of Kokonoe (former yokozuna Chiyonoyama) in 1967 and the first to do so in a friendly manner in 56 years since Tochigiyama. At its peak in 1931, an entire section of the banzuke was occupied by wrestlers of the clan during the spring and summer tournaments.

=== Nishonoseki ichimon ===
The Nishonoseki ichimon (二所ノ関一門), also sometimes called the Nishonoseki-Futagoyama clan, was founded just before World War II by Yokozuna Tamanishiki. Initially, the Nishonoseki stable was part of the larger Tomozuna clan led by the eponymous stable. The Nishonoseki stable was led by former sekiwake Kaizan Tarō II, who recruited Tamanishiki. The former Kaizan died in 1931, and Tamanishiki took over his name and rebuilt his stable in 1935. When the clan was created, its unofficial aim was to challenge the supremacy of the Dewanoumi ichimon. In the immediate post-war period, his successor, the former sekiwake Tamanoumi Umekichi, launched a policy of clan expansion by encouraging independence. This had the direct consequence of the independence of Kotonishiki (Sadogatake stable) and Ōnoumi (Hanakago stable). Since this policy was continued by subsequent generations of Nishonoseki, the Nishonoseki ichimon is today the clan with the largest number of stables.

After the initial post-war period, the clan continued to gain influence, while being led by then-young figures like yokozuna Taihō, Tamanoumi, Wakanohana I, Wajima and Kotozakura I. Due to the clan's expansion policy, their unity is considered weak and this situation created many problems, notably in 1975 when Oshiogawa stable was founded following the dissatisfaction of former ōzeki Daikirin (which led to the retirement of top-ranker Tenryū) and also when Takanohana stable became independent in January 2010. Although still influential on the Sumo Association board of directors, the clan stagnated in recent years. One of the reasons given was that no main household stablemaster had previously held the rank of yokozuna since Tamanishiki's retirement in 1938. This lack of clan leader sporting influence came to an end when Kisenosato assumed the Nishonoseki elder name in December 2021.

=== Tokitsukaze ichimon ===
The Tokitsukaze ichimon (時津風一門) is also an influential clan, thanks in part to former yokozuna Futabayama. The latter was a wrestler for Tatsunami stable and decided to become independent by launching his own dojo in 1941. Thanks to Futabayama's good relations with other wrestlers, his stable grew in numbers by merging other smaller stables (notably the Kumegawa stable of former ōzeki Kagamiiwa). The clan was later strengthened by the incorporation of the Izutsu stable, which had a long tradition, and Isenoumi stable, which until its integration into the Tokitsukaze ichimon led its own clan. Thanks to their growing number, the Tokitsukaze faction was soon able to become independent of the Tatsunami ichimon to which the main stable belonged. After Futabayama, the clan continued to grow in influence, thanks in particular to Yutakayama Katsuo. He maintained strong links with his alma mater, the Tokyo University of Agriculture, and many of the clan's recruits still come from this university.

In recent years, the clan's fortunes have been changing. In particular, the clan was publicly criticized after the Tokitsukaze stable hazing scandal. In December 2016, based on persistent disagreements between the masters of the two stables, the Oitekaze stable switched clans and left the Isegahama ichimon to join the Tokitsukaze clan. This decision was based on the long-standing ties between the Tatsunami ichimon (the former name of the Isegahama clan) and the Tokitsukaze ichimon, whose founder Futabayama himself came from Tatsunami stable.

Because of its size, the clan frequently collaborates with the Takasago ichimon to form alliances of interest.

=== Takasago ichimon ===
Although the Takasago ichimon (髙砂一門), sometimes referred as the Takasago-Kokonoe clan, is the oldest of all the existing clans, it is also the smallest. The clan's origins lie in the discontent of wrestlers in the early Meiji period. One of them, Takasago Uragorō, launched protest movements before leading his own troupe independent of the Tokyo-based sumo association: the Takasago Kaisei-Gumi (高砂改正組). In the 1880s, the group reattached to Tokyo and Takasago emerged as a major figure in the association, being elected director in 1883.

The clan seems to be losing momentum with the lack of iconic wrestlers in recent years, despite a large part of the clan's influence being due to Kokonoe stable and to the emblematic wrestler Chiyonofuji and the wrestlers he raised. Chiyonofuji himself, however, never rose to the rank of chairman of the Sumo Association despite his sporting achievements, one of the reasons given being his membership of a weak clan and a certain arrogance in his dealings with the other elders. Because of its size, the clan frequently collaborates with the Tokitsukaze ichimon to form alliances of interest.

In 2020, the former Asasekiryū took charge of Takasago stable and became the first foreign-born wrestler to head an ichimon in professional sumo history.

=== Isegahama ichimon ===
The Isegahama ichimon (伊勢ヶ濱一門) is one of the smallest and lacks influence, notably because its stables had few links with each other before the clan was founded. The clan's complex history is reflected in its name, which has changed as the balance of influence within the ichimon shifted. The clan's history dates back to the Taishō era when former komusubi Midorishima founded the Tatsunami stable in 1915. This stable was part of the Tomozuna ichimon, from which the Nishonoseki ichimon also descended. As more stables were incorporated into the Tatsunami stable and through its alliance with the Isegahama stable, the clan was able to expand under the name of Tatsunami-Isegahama union (立浪-伊勢ヶ濱連合). When the original Isegahama stable closed in February 2007, the clan was renamed for the first time as Tatsunami ichimon (立浪一門). In May 2012, the Tatsunami stable left its own clan to join the newly created Takanohana ichimon. As a result, the clan decided to change its name to Kasugayama-Isegahama union (春日山-伊勢ケ浜連合). Finally, in November of the same year, the clan changed its name to Isegahama ichimon after the affair and resignation of the former Kasugayama stablemaster (the former Kasugafuji).

The ichimon owed the basis of its influence to the golden age of the Dewanoumi ichimon, when the latter dominated competitions with both yokozuna Tsunenohana and Tochigiyama. The Isegahama ichimon managed to stand out under the impetus of former sekiwake Kiyosegawa and Hatasegawa.

The Isegahama clan is the only one to have never acceded to the association's chairmanship. Because of his sporting achievements, former yokozuna Hakuhō was long considered by public opinion to be a prime candidate for the association's highest office, but following Hokuseihō's scandal and retirement his position was considered compromised.

== Historical ichimon ==
There was a multitude of clans in the past, some of them having been dismantled. Before 2018, it was possible for stables to form loose coalitions or not to align themselves with a particular clan and remain independent.

The Tomozuna ichimon (友綱一門) was the major clan of the mid-Meiji era. The Tomozuna clan has its origins in the decline of the Tamagaki ichimon (玉垣一門), that clan having raised important wrestlers, such as Umegatani I. At the heart of the clan was the eponymous stable, founded by former maegashira Kaizan Tarō I when the latter became independent of the Tamagaki stable. The clan could count on the support of Itagaki Taisuke, who became a major patron of the stable. The clan quickly gained influence, thanks in particular to the trio Tachiyama, Kunimiyama and Yahatayama. From this clan came the ichimon of Nishonoseki and Isegahama (then founded by Tatsunami stable). Tatsunami was founded by Komusubi Midorishima in 1915 and Nishonoseki was founded by Yokozuna Tamanishiki in 1935.

Another example of a historic clan is the recently disbanded Takanohana ichimon (貴ノ花一門). After retiring from the ring in 2003, Yokozuna Takanohana inherited Futagoyama stable from his father, the former Takanohana Kenshi. On the strength of his great popularity, he stood for election as director of the Sumo Association in 2010. This was an unusual candidacy, as it is traditional to discuss candidacies within one's clan before standing. Takanohana left his clan, the Nishonoseki ichimon, because it had decided to nominate other candidates. This unprecedented event was later called the Takanoran (貴の乱, Taka's rebellion). Takanohana was elected director of the association, and the stables that had supported his candidacy joined his faction, which became independent of the Nishonoseki ichimon after the exclusion of stables from this group (Ōnomatsu stable, Ōtake stable, Magaki stable) that had voted in contradiction to the clan's plans. A fourth stable (Tatsunami stable) joined the Takanohana faction in 2012 and in May 2014 the independent group was officially recognised as an ichimon, because, according to the association's statutes, there was no difference in the amount of money to be paid to the Takanohana group that could differentiate it from a fully-fledged clan. After the Takanoiwa affair, the clan began to distance itself from Takanohana. Takanohana disbanded his ichimon in 2018 after a failed director election.

Immediately after the dissolution of the Takanohana ichimon, Ōnomatsu stable took over the leadership of the group from the remaining stables formerly affiliated with Takanohana (the Tatsunami and Chiganoura stables had already separated from the clan). The newly formed Ōnomatsu group (阿武松グループ) was short-lived and the group disbanded in November 2018, with all the stables that showed support for Takanohana joining the Nishonoseki ichimon, with the exception of Tatsunami, which joined the Dewanoumi ichimon.

== Operation ==
Each ichimon answers to its honke, its mother house, which is the stable whose name is used to designate the entire clan. The clan's other stables are referred to as bunke (branches), and the relationship between them and the mother stable is called dōmon (同門; "studying under a same teacher"). If an elder decides to set up his own stable and he and his former master part on good terms, his stable will be part of the same group as his original stable. The organization of the clan system is particularly important within the Japan Sumo Association, as its balance determines the positions of directors and the balance of power within the board of directors ahead of the elections.

The ichimon are encouraged to support each other. This support is shown above all during training sessions, with the clans regularly organising and taking part in joint training sessions. These sessions, called degeiko (出稽古) offer wrestlers (and mainly sekitori) a chance for more rewarding training by expanding the number of wrestlers they can train with. Each clan has its own way of doing things. For example, it is customary for the Nishonoseki ichimon to organise six joint training sessions a year. Within the Dewanoumi ichimon, it is often the Dewanoumi and Kasugano stables that meet in preparation for the January tournament.

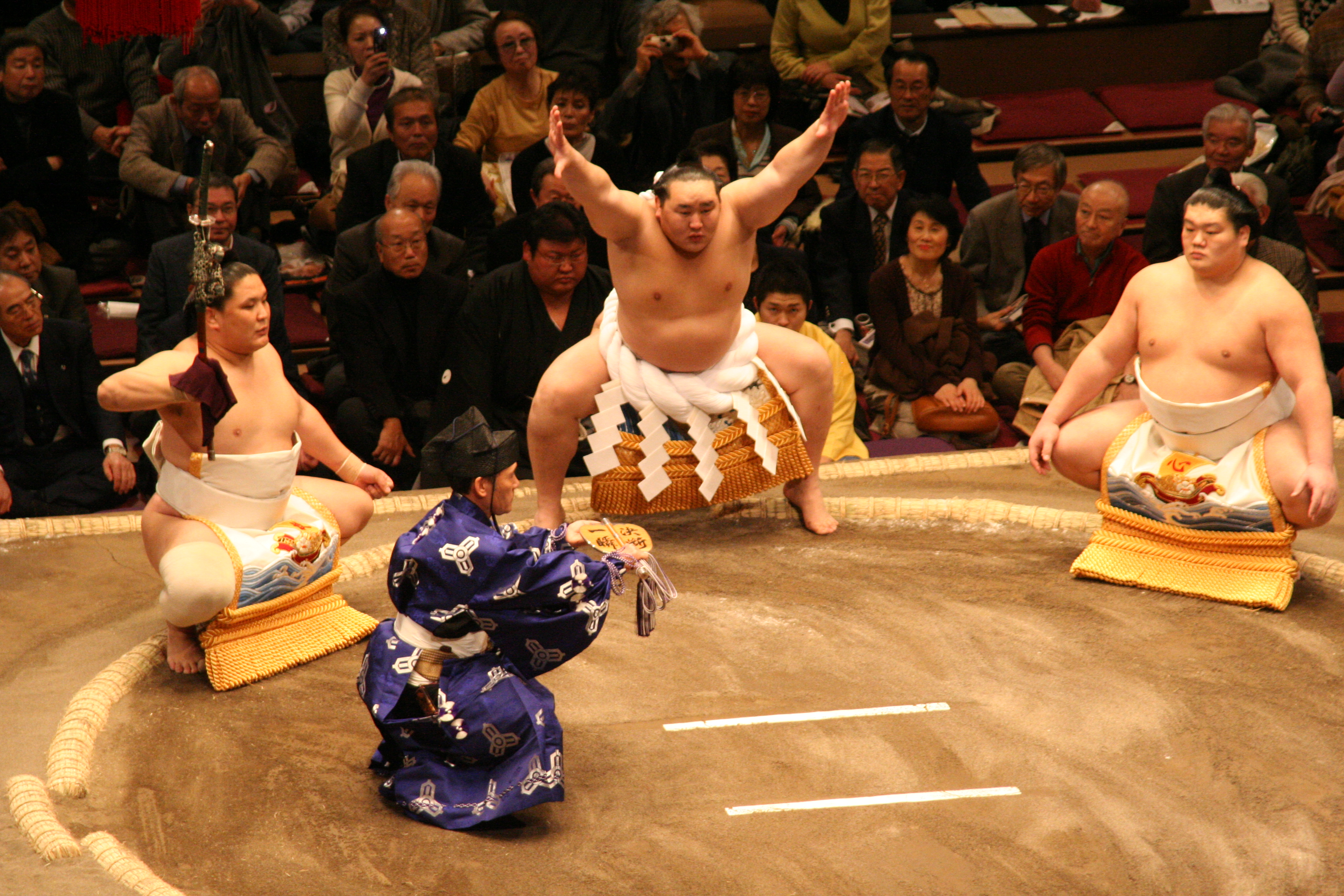
Asasekiryū (Takasago stable, left) and Hokutōriki (Hakkaku stable, right), both members of the Takasago ichimon, acts as tachimochi and tsuyuharai of Asashōryū during his ring-entering ceremony in January 2008.

Outside of training sessions, members of an ichimon are expected to attend the wedding and funeral of a member of the same clan. Similarly, when a promotion is announced, it is customary for members of a clan to attend to congratulate the promoted wrestler. At the end of a tournament, it is customary for the winner to be accompanied in the parade out of the arena by a wrestler from his ichimon, who acts as flag-bearer. After a wrestler is promoted to the rank of yokozuna, it is traditional for the ceremony to create his tsuna (sacred rope belt) to be organized by his stable and those of his ichimon. It is also customary for a yokozuna to perform his ring-entering ceremony accompanied by a tsuyuharai and a tachimochi from his clan.

However, the most visible part of the support shown by the ichimon is political, with the association's chairman elected every two years. The ichimon serves as quasi-political groupings, each clan nominating candidates for the ten positions or so that are available on the association's board each election cycle. Each vote is normally along the interests of the ichimon, which explain why the bigger clans more often holds the association's chairmanship. Former wrestler popularity however plays a role in the credit given to an application. For example, former yokozuna Takanohana won four straight election bids to become director before his demotion in 2018, despite being the leader of a (now dissolved) small ichimon.

The ichimon also plays a role in the appointment of shimpan (judges) who can question the decision made by the referees during matches, each clan having a number of judges reserved for it in this department of the association, which has only twenty members.
