= Kaiketsu Masateru =

Japanese sumo wrestler

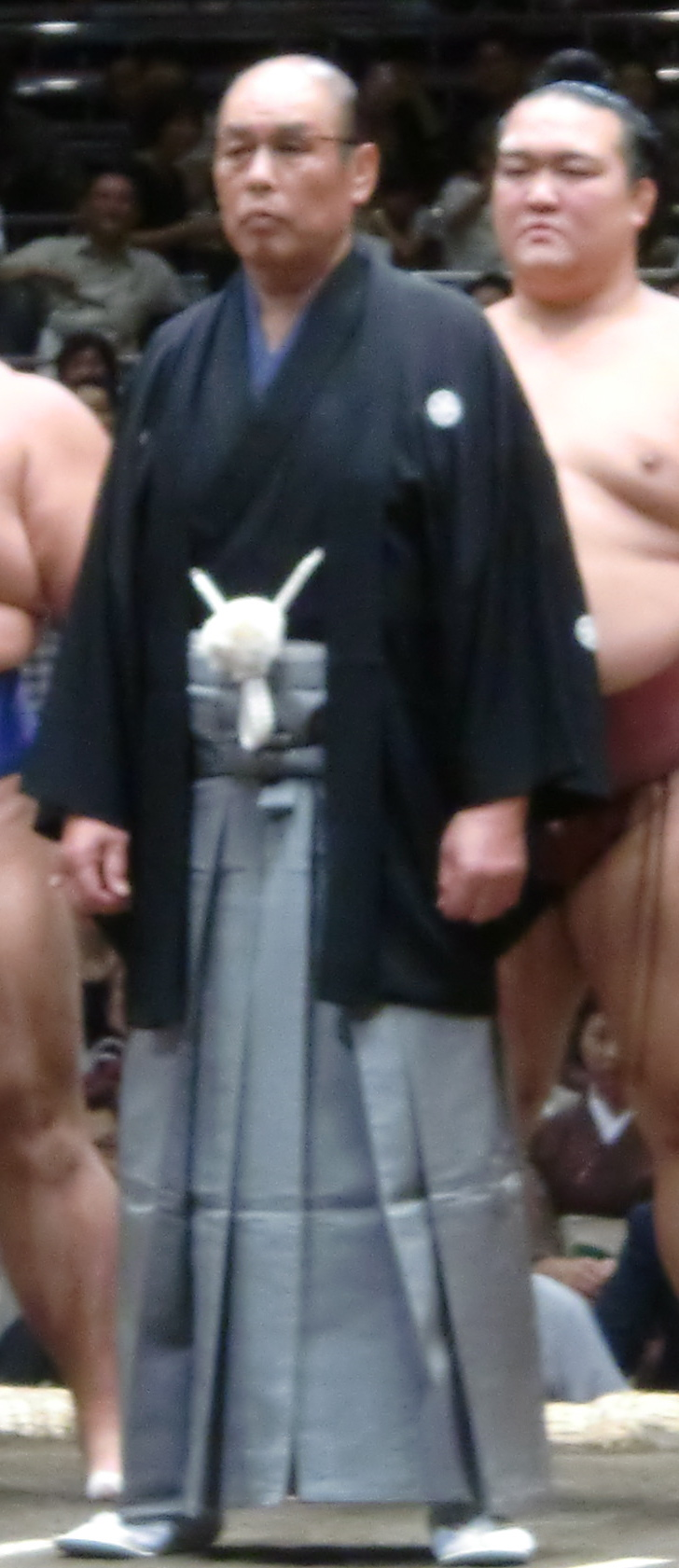
- Kaiketsu as chairman on the opening day of September 2011 tournament.

Personal information
- Native name: 魁傑 將晃
- Born: Teruyuki Nishimori; February 16, 1948 Yamaguchi, Japan
- Died: May 18, 2014 (aged 66) Tokyo, Japan
- Height: 1.88 m (6 ft 2 in)
- Weight: 128 kg (282 lb)

Sport
- Sport: Sumo
- Retired: January 1979
- Heya: Hanakago
- Record: 528–410–0
- Debut: September 1966
- Highest rank: Ōzeki (March 1975)
- Elder name: Hanaregoma
- Championships: 2 (Makuuchi); 1 (Sandanme); 1 (Jonokuchi)
- Special Prizes: Outstanding Performance (2); Fighting Spirit (7); Technique(1)
- Gold Stars: 3 Kitanofuji; Kotozakura; Kitanoumi
- Updated on June 2020

Kaiketsu Masateru (Japanese: 魁傑 將晃, born Teruyuki Nishimori; February 16, 1948 – May 18, 2014) was a Japanese sumo wrestler, who reached the second highest rank of ōzeki on two occasions. He also won two top division tournament championships. After his retirement in 1979 he became a coach under the name of Hanaregoma-oyakata and established Hanaregoma stable. He was also chairman of the Japan Sumo Association from 2010 to 2012.

== Career ==
While at Nihon University he practiced judo. He made his professional sumo debut in September 1966 at the age of 18, fighting out of Hanakago stable. Initially fighting under his own surname of Nishimori, he reached the second jūryō division in January 1970. He adopted the shikona of Hananishiki before switching to Kaiketsu in November 1970. He reached the top makuuchi division in September 1971. In March 1972 from the maegashira 7 ranking he was the tournament runner-up to Hasegawa, who defeated him in a playoff, and he was given special prizes for Outstanding Performance and Technique. At the following tournament in May 1972 he made his san'yaku debut at komusubi rank. After scoring 11 wins there and finishing as runner-up to his stablemate Wajima he was promoted to sekiwake. He was also a runner-up in January 1973.

In September 1974 Kaiketsu turned in a make-koshi or losing score of 7–8 at sekiwake rank but then took his first top division yūshō or championship in November as a komusubi. He scored twelve wins against three losses, and defeated yokozuna Kitanoumi in a playoff. He followed this up with an 11–4 score in January 1975. His combined total of wins over the last three tournaments was 30, below the normal standard for ōzeki promotion of 33, but there was only one ōzeki at the time, Takanohana, so the Sumo Association decided to promote Kaiketsu.

After suffering from hepatitis and lower back pain, Kaiketsu was demoted from ōzeki less than a year after reaching the rank following two consecutive losing scores. However, in September 1976 ranked at maegashira 4, he took his second tournament championship with a 14–1 record, followed by consecutive 11–4 scores at sekiwake in November 1976 and January 1977. He was promoted to ōzeki once again, alongside Wakamisugi, to whom he had a superior three tournament record. However, he held the rank for only four more tournaments, and soon fell back to the maegashira ranks. He retired in January 1979, having not missed a single bout in his 12-year career. He once said, "Being absent from a tournament means deliberately abandoning a bout." In addition to his two yūshō he had accumulated ten special prizes (including seven for Fighting Spirit) and three kinboshi.

== After retirement ==
Kaiketsu set up his own training stable, Hanaregoma stable, in 1981 after breaking away from Hanakago. Joining him was future yokozuna Ōnokuni. In 1985, when Hanakago stable was wound up, all its wrestlers transferred to Hanaregoma. Other top division wrestlers he trained included Hananokuni, Hananoumi and Shunketsu. He also became a Director of the Japan Sumo Association, responsible for managing the judges, and supervising the examination of new recruits. In August 2010 he took over as head of the Association after the resignation of Musashigawa. Following a match-fixing scandal which broke in February 2011 he announced an independent investigation and the cancellation of the March 2011 Osaka honbasho. He insisted that there was no match-fixing in the past, a claim that drew criticism from sumo commentator and former wrestler Mainoumi. He stood down from the post at the February 2012 Sumo Association board elections as the terms are for two years and he was close to the mandatory retirement age of 65. He left the Sumo Association in February 2013 and Hanaregoma stable was absorbed into Shibatayama stable, run by the former Ōnokuni. He died on May 18, 2014, while practicing golf. He was 66.

== Fighting style ==
Kaiketsu's favourite kimarite or techniques were tsuppari (a series of rapid thrusts to the chest), hidari yotsu (a right hand outside, left hand inside grip on the mawashi), yori kiri (force out) and uwatenage (overarm throw).

== Career record ==
Kaiketsu Masateru
Year	January Hatsu basho, Tokyo	March Haru basho, Osaka	May Natsu basho, Tokyo	July Nagoya basho, Nagoya	September Aki basho, Tokyo	November Kyūshū basho, Fukuoka
1966	x	x	x	x	(Maezumo)	West Jonokuchi #19; 7–0; Champion
1967	West Jonidan #5; 6–1	East Sandanme #60; 4–3	West Sandanme #90; 5–2	East Sandanme #48; 3–4	East Sandanme #58; 5–2	East Sandanme #28; 3–4
1968	West Sandanme #35; 7–0; Champion	East Makushita #28; 3–4	West Makushita #31; 4–3	West Makushita #26; 4–3	East Makushita #23; 6–1	East Makushita #8; 4–3
1969	East Makushita #6; 4–3	West Makushita #3; 3–4	West Makushita #5; 1–6	West Makushita #26; 6–1	East Makushita #4; 3–4	West Makushita #7; 6–1
1970	East Jūryō #13; 4–11	West Makushita #5; 5–2	West Makushita #1; 6–1	East Jūryō #11; 7–8	East Jūryō #13; 11–4	East Jūryō #4; 7–8
1971	East Jūryō #6; 8–7	West Jūryō #4; 8–7	West Jūryō #3; 10–5	West Jūryō #1; 11–4	East Maegashira #9; 7–8	West Maegashira #10; 8–7
1972	East Maegashira #5; 7–8	West Maegashira #7; 12–3–P; TO★	East Komusubi #2; 11–4; F	West Sekiwake #2; 10–5	West Sekiwake #1; 7–8	West Sekiwake #1; 7–8
1973	West Maegashira #1; 11–4; F	East Sekiwake #1; 4–11	East Maegashira #4; 9–6 ★	East Komusubi #1; 8–7	East Sekiwake #1; 7–8	West Komusubi #1; 8–7
1974	West Komusubi #1; 11–4; F	East Sekiwake #1; 10–5	East Sekiwake #1; 8–7	East Sekiwake #1; 8–7	East Sekiwake #2; 7–8	West Komusubi #2; 12–3–P; O
1975	East Sekiwake #1; 11–4	West Ōzeki #1; 11–4	West Ōzeki #1; 12–3	East Ōzeki #1; 8–7	East Ōzeki #1; 6–9	West Ōzeki #1; 6–9
1976	West Sekiwake #1; 7–8	East Maegashira #1; 5–10 ★	West Maegashira #6; 10–5; F	West Komusubi #1; 5–10	West Maegashira #4; 14–1; F	West Sekiwake #1; 11–4; F
1977	West Sekiwake #1; 11–4; F	East Ōzeki #2; 8–7	West Ōzeki #2; 8–7	West Ōzeki #2; 6–9	West Ōzeki #3; 5–10	West Sekiwake #1; 6–9
1978	West Maegashira #1; 6–9	West Maegashira #4; 10–5	East Komusubi #1; 6–9	West Maegashira #3; 7–8	West Maegashira #4; 8–7	West Maegashira #2; 4–11
1979	West Maegashira #9; Retired; 4–7	x	x	x	x	x
Record given as wins–losses–absences Top division champion Top division runner-up Retired Lower divisions Non-participation Sanshō key: F=Fighting spirit; O=Outstanding performance; T=Technique Also shown: ★=Kinboshi; P=Playoff(s); Divisions: Makuuchi — Jūryō — Makushita — Sandanme — Jonidan — Jonokuchi Makuuchi ranks: Yokozuna — Ōzeki — Sekiwake — Komusubi — Maegashira

== See also ==
- Glossary of sumo terms
- List of sumo tournament top division champions
- List of sumo tournament top division runners-up
- List of past sumo wrestlers
- List of ōzeki

Sporting positions
Preceded by Mienoumi Tsuyoshi	Chairman of the Japan Sumo Association; 2010–2012	Succeeded by Kitanoumi Toshimitsu
