= Arase Nagahide =

Japanese sumo wrestler and television personality (1949–2008)

Personal information
- Native name: 荒勢 永英
- Born: Arase Hideo; 20 June 1949 Ino, Kōchi, Japan
- Died: 11 August 2008 (aged 59)
- Height: 1.78 m (5 ft 10 in)
- Weight: 145 kg (320 lb; 22.8 st)

Sport
- Sport: Sumo
- Retired: September, 1981
- Heya: Hanakago
- Record: 420-414-11
- Debut: January, 1972
- Highest rank: Sekiwake (May, 1976)
- Elder name: Magaki
- Special Prizes: Technique (1); Outstanding Performance (1); Fighting Spirit (2)
- Gold Stars: 2 (Kotozakura, Kitanoumi)
- Updated on June 2020

Arase Nagahide (荒勢 永英; 20 June 1949 – 11 August 2008), real name Arase Hideo (荒瀬 英生) was a sumo wrestler from Ino, Agawa District, Kōchi Prefecture, Japan. His highest rank was sekiwake. After his retirement in 1981 he became a television personality and ran unsuccessfully for political office.

== Career ==
His parents were farmers. He began sumo at Kochi junior high school. He was an amateur sumo champion at Nihon University, coming third in the All Japan Sumo Tournament in his third year. He made his professional debut in 1972, beginning as a makushita tsukedashi entrant, and reached the top makuuchi division the following year. He was a member of Hanakago stable and a stablemate of yokozuna Wajima, a fellow Nihon University graduate. He once wore a cream-coloured mawashi, or belt, in a tournament, the only wrestler so far to do so. He fought under his family name of Arase, although he changed the second part of it from Hideo to Nagahide in 1975. He was involved in an unusual incident when in a match against Tamanofuji the referee was knocked out of the dohyo having failed to get out of the wrestlers’ way, and had to be told who was the winner. He fought in the top division for 48 tournaments, with a win/loss record of 351-367-2. He won four sansho or special prizes and two kinboshi or gold stars. He defeated yokozuna Kitanoumi in January 1980 having previously lost to him 27 times in a row (the second worst record ever for a wrestler against the same opponent, after Kaneshiro who lost 29 consecutive bouts to Kitanoumi). In a match against Wakamisugi on the 8th day of the July 1976 tournament there were eight matta or false starts, and both wrestlers were criticized by the chief judge. Arase had a reputation for regularly engaging in false starts, and there was a suggestion from the sansho committee when he was up for the Fighting Spirit Award in March 1975 that this should disqualify him from receiving the prize, although he was given it in the end. He held the third highest rank of sekiwake for nine tournaments in total, including four straight from September 1977 to March 1978. However he only once had a double-digit winning record at the rank and so never seriously challenged for ozeki promotion. Hampered by a right knee injury, he announced his retirement in September 1981.

== Retirement from sumo ==
After his retirement he was briefly an elder of the Japan Sumo Association under the name of Magaki but left in February 1983, turning the name over to Wakanohana II, and became a television personality. He stood for election to the House of Councillors as a Liberal League candidate in 2001, but was unsuccessful. He suffered a stroke in 2006. He died of heart failure in 2008 at the age of 59.

== Fighting style ==
He was a yotsu-sumo (grappling) wrestler who preferred the migi-yotsu (right hand inside, left hand outside) position on the mawashi. He employed the gaburi-yori technique of pushing with the stomach while grabbing the mawashi, a style also associated with Kotoshogiku.

== Career record ==
Arase Nagahide
Year	January Hatsu basho, Tokyo	March Haru basho, Osaka	May Natsu basho, Tokyo	July Nagoya basho, Nagoya	September Aki basho, Tokyo	November Kyūshū basho, Fukuoka
1972	Makushita tsukedashi #60; 5–2	West Makushita #38; 5–2	West Makushita #22; 6–1–P	West Makushita #7; 5–2	East Makushita #2; 6–1	West Jūryō #9; 8–7
1973	East Jūryō #8; 8–7	East Jūryō #7; 9–6	West Jūryō #2; 10–5	East Maegashira #13; 9–6	East Maegashira #9; 6–9	West Maegashira #11; 8–7
1974	West Maegashira #10; 9–6	East Maegashira #5; 7–8 ★	West Maegashira #6; 11–4; O	West Maegashira #1; 6–9	West Maegashira #3; 10–5; F	East Komusubi #2; 5–10
1975	West Maegashira #4; 8–7	West Maegashira #2; 9–6; F	West Komusubi #1; 6–9	West Maegashira #2; 8–7	West Maegashira #1; 6–9	West Maegashira #4; 8–7
1976	West Maegashira #2; 8–7	West Maegashira #1; 8–7	West Sekiwake #1; 8–7	East Sekiwake #2; 6–9	West Maegashira #2; 6–9	West Maegashira #6; 9–6
1977	West Maegashira #1; 9–6	West Sekiwake #1; 7–8	West Komusubi #1; 8–7	East Komusubi #1; 8–7	East Sekiwake #1; 11–4; T	East Sekiwake #1; 8–7
1978	East Sekiwake #1; 8–7	West Sekiwake #1; 7–8	West Komusubi #1; 5–10	West Maegashira #5; 8–7	West Maegashira #2; 5–10	West Maegashira #8; 6–9
1979	East Maegashira #11; 8–7	West Maegashira #6; 8–7	West Maegashira #2; 5–10	East Maegashira #7; 8–7	West Maegashira #2; 3–12	East Maegashira #12; 10–5
1980	East Maegashira #2; 8–7 ★	West Sekiwake #1; 8–7	East Sekiwake #1; 3–12	East Maegashira #8; 8–7	West Maegashira #6; 6–9	West Maegashira #9; 8–7
1981	East Maegashira #6; 5–10	West Maegashira #11; 9–6	East Maegashira #7; 3–10–2	East Jūryō #1; 6–9	West Jūryō #7; Retired; 1–5	x
Record given as wins–losses–absences Top division champion Top division runner-up Retired Lower divisions Non-participation Sanshō key: F=Fighting spirit; O=Outstanding performance; T=Technique Also shown: ★=Kinboshi; P=Playoff(s); Divisions: Makuuchi — Jūryō — Makushita — Sandanme — Jonidan — Jonokuchi Makuuchi ranks: Yokozuna — Ōzeki — Sekiwake — Komusubi — Maegashira

== See also ==
- List of past sumo wrestlers
- List of sekiwake
