= Wakamisugi =

Wakamisugi is a surname. Notable people with the surname include:

- Wakamisugi Akiteru (1937–1983), sumo wrestler later known as Daigō Hisateru
- Wakanohana Kanji II (1953–2022), sumo wrestler, previously known as Wakamisugi Kanji
