= Hananoumi Ken =

Sumo wrestler

Personal information
- Native name: 花乃湖 健
- Born: Ken Sawaishi; 6 December 1960 (age 65) Ikawa, Akita, Japan
- Height: 1.81 m (5 ft 11 1/2 in)
- Weight: 134 kg (295 lb)

Sport
- Sport: Sumo
- Retired: July, 1989
- Heya: Hanakago - Hanaregoma
- Record: 402-369-55
- Debut: May, 1976
- Highest rank: Komusubi (May, 1987)
- Elder name: Hanakago
- Championships: 1 (Makushita)
- Special Prizes: Technique (2)
- Gold Stars: 4 Chiyonofuji (2); Hokutoumi (2)
- Updated on June 25, 2020

Hananoumi Ken (born 6 December 1960 as Ken Sawaishi) is a former sumo wrestler from Ikawa, Akita, Japan. He made his professional debut in May 1976, and reached the top division in March 1985. His highest rank was komusubi. He retired in July 1989.

== Career ==
He was persuaded by his father, a rice farmer, to be a sumo wrestler, although he really wanted to play baseball. He joined the original Hanakago stable in May 1976, and for five years he was a tsukebito or personal attendant to yokozuna Wajima Hiroshi, until the latter's retirement in 1981. The two spent much of their spare time tinkering with Wajima's luxury American automobile, a Lincoln Continental. Sawaishi began competing under his own surname, although he went through a number of different shikona, including Otowadake, Sawakaze and Onoumi, before finally settling on Hananoumi, meaning ′lake or sea of flowers.′

In July 1983 he took the makushita division championship with a perfect 7–0 record and was promoted to the juryo division, becoming a fully fledged sekitori for the first time. He reached the top makuuchi division in March 1985 and just one tournament later won his first sansho or special prize, for Technique. In November 1985 he had his first victory over a yokozuna, earning a kinboshi for defeating tournament winner Chiyonofuji. In March 1987 he beat Chiyonofuji again, scored ten wins at maegashira 1 and won his second Technique Award, and with it promotion to what was to be his highest rank of komusubi. In September 1987 he achieved the feat of winning a majority of wins against losses (kachi-koshi) despite missing four days and having to return for the last seven – the first time this had been done in the top division for 22 years. On the seventh day of the May 1988 tournament he was defeated by Chiyonofuji, the first bout in Chiyonofuji's post-war record winning streak of 53 consecutive matches.

== Retirement from sumo ==
In March 1989 Hananoumi returned to the komusubi rank but had a disastrous tournament, losing his first nine bouts before withdrawing injured on Day 10. In May he defaulted on Day 5 after losing his first four matches due to a herniated disk and was never to appear on the dohyo again, retiring after missing the July 1989 tournament altogether. He remained in sumo for a short time as an elder under the name Hanakago Oyakata (formerly used by his old boss Wajima), but left the Sumo Association in June 1990. He ran a chanko restaurant in Akita and after it closed ran a hotel in Nanporo, Hokkaido.

== Fighting style ==
Hananoumi had an unusual fighting style, preferring to come in low at the tachi-ai and push up against the opponent's armpits, known as hazu–oshi. He also liked the throat thrust, or nodowa. When fighting on the mawashi he used a double inside grip, or morozashi. His two most common winning kimarite were yorikiri (force out) and oshidashi (push out).

== Career record ==
Hananoumi Ken
Year	January Hatsu basho, Tokyo	March Haru basho, Osaka	May Natsu basho, Tokyo	July Nagoya basho, Nagoya	September Aki basho, Tokyo	November Kyūshū basho, Fukuoka
1976	x	x	(Maezumo)	West Jonokuchi #14; 5–2	East Jonidan #94; 4–3	West Jonidan #73; 2–5
1977	West Jonidan #93; 5–2	East Jonidan #53; 2–5	East Jonidan #80; 3–3–1	East Jonidan #94; 5–2	West Jonidan #58; 3–4	East Jonidan #67; 6–1
1978	East Jonidan #7; 2–5	East Jonidan #30; 3–4	East Jonidan #42; 6–1	West Sandanme #78; 3–4	East Jonidan #5; 5–2	East Sandanme #60; 5–2
1979	East Sandanme #35; 3–4	West Sandanme #51; 5–2	East Sandanme #28; 1–6	West Sandanme #58; 5–2	East Sandanme #32; 6–1	West Makushita #56; 3–4
1980	East Sandanme #9; 6–1	West Makushita #38; 3–4	West Makushita #48; 1–6	East Sandanme #19; 4–3	West Sandanme #4; 4–3	West Makushita #50; 5–2
1981	East Makushita #30; 2–5	East Makushita #55; Sat out due to injury 0–0–7	West Sandanme #31; 5–2	West Sandanme #4; 4–3	West Makushita #52; 6–1	West Makushita #21; 4–3
1982	East Makushita #13; 2–5	East Makushita #28; 5–2	East Makushita #16; 4–3	West Makushita #13; 3–4	East Makushita #24; 4–3	West Makushita #15; 5–2
1983	East Makushita #5; 1–3–3	East Makushita #28; 6–1	East Makushita #10; 4–3	West Makushita #6; 7–0–P; Champion	West Jūryō #10; 8–7	West Jūryō #6; 6–9
1984	East Jūryō #8; 10–5	East Jūryō #3; 8–7	West Jūryō #2; 7–5–3	West Jūryō #3; 4–11	East Jūryō #10; 8–7	West Jūryō #7; 11–4–PP
1985	East Jūryō #1; 9–6	West Maegashira #13; 9–6	West Maegashira #6; 8–7; T	East Maegashira #2; 4–11	West Maegashira #9; 8–7	East Maegashira #3; 5–10 ★
1986	West Maegashira #9; 10–5	East Maegashira #3; 8–7	East Maegashira #1; 1–6–8	East Maegashira #14; Sat out due to injury 0–0–15	East Maegashira #14; 10–5	East Maegashira #5; 7–8
1987	East Maegashira #7; 9–6	West Maegashira #1; 10–5; T★	West Komusubi #1; 6–9	West Maegashira #1; 4–11	West Maegashira #8; 8–4–3	West Maegashira #2; 6–9
1988	West Maegashira #4; 8–7 ★	East Maegashira #1; 6–9 ★	East Maegashira #3; 7–8	West Maegashira #4; 8–7	East Maegashira #1; 5–10	East Maegashira #5; 7–8
1989	West Maegashira #6; 10–5	West Komusubi #1; 0–10–5	West Maegashira #10; 0–5–10	West Jūryō #8; Retired; 0–0–0	x	x
Record given as wins–losses–absences Top division champion Top division runner-up Retired Lower divisions Non-participation Sanshō key: F=Fighting spirit; O=Outstanding performance; T=Technique Also shown: ★=Kinboshi; P=Playoff(s); Divisions: Makuuchi — Jūryō — Makushita — Sandanme — Jonidan — Jonokuchi Makuuchi ranks: Yokozuna — Ōzeki — Sekiwake — Komusubi — Maegashira

== See also ==
- Glossary of sumo terms
- List of past sumo wrestlers
- List of komusubi
