= Hanakago stable (1952-1985) =

Defunct sumo stable

Hanakago stable (花籠部屋, Hanakago beya) (1952–1985) was a sumo stable of the Nishonoseki group, known as Shibatayama stable from September 1952 to May 1953. Founded by former maegashira Ōnoumi Hisamitsu. It closed in 1985 with all wrestlers and personnel moving to Hanaregoma stable.

== History ==
=== Previous incarnation ===
A previous incarnation of the stable existed from 1929 to 1947, run by former sekiwake Misugiiso. This version had produced a couple of sekitori, the highest ranking of which being Tominoyama.

=== Ōnoumi’s version ===
Upon Ōnoumi's retirement in May 1952 he branched off from Nishonoseki stable and created his own Shibatayama stable taking with him along with others the future yokozuna Wakanohana Kanji I. In May 1953 he received the Hanakago elder stock and changed the name of the stable to match. he had quick success coaching Wakanohana to ōzeki in 1956 and then yokozuna in 1958. 1958 was a good year for the stable as it saw the promotion of the first two homegrown sekitori (those who had started their career at Hanakago). The stable's success would continue throughout the 1960s and 1970s, with Wajima making ōzeki in November 1972 and yokozuna by July 1973. In 1975 Ōnoumi oversaw the promotion of Kaiketsu to ōzeki making it one of the most dominating stables of the 1970s.

=== Offshoot stables ===
In 1962 after the retirement of Wakanohana the stable would see it first branch off, with Wakanohana setting up Futagoyama stable.

In January 1981 the stable would see another one of its wrestlers, Kaiketsu, branch off creating Hanaregoma stable, in the processing taking future yokozuna Ōnokuni with him.

=== Retirement and controversies ===
Just over a month later in March 1981 Ōnoumi would reach the mandatory retirement age, passing the stable to Wajima who had married the stablemaster's eldest daughter. However, his time there as oyakata was controversial. He lacked leadership qualities and most unusually did not even live in the stable, preferring to commute. Hanakago declined to the point when it did not have any top-division wrestlers left. In 1982 his wife attempted suicide and he was demoted from his position as a judge as a result. The marriage eventually ended in divorce. In 1985 he was pressured by fellow oyakata to resign from the Sumo Association after it emerged that he was heavily in debt due to the failure of his chankonabe restaurant and had put up his share in the Sumo Association as collateral on a loan, a practice strictly forbidden. The stable folded completely in 1985 with all its wrestlers transferring to the affiliated Hanaregoma stable.

== Owners ==
- 1981–1985: 12th Hanakago Hiroshi (54th yokozuna, Wajima Hiroshi)
- 1952–1981: 11th Hanakago Hisamitsu (maegashira, Onoumi Hisamitsu)

== Notable wrestlers ==
- Wakanohana Kanji I (45th yokozuna)
- Kaiketsu Masateru (ōzeki)
- Daigō Hisateru (sekiwake)
- Arase Nagahide (sekiwake)
- Wakachichibu Komei (sekiwake)
- Hananoumi Ken (komusubi)
- Ryūko Seihō (komusubi)
- Wakanoumi Masateru (komusubi)
- Daikokubō Benkei (jūryō)

== See also ==
- List of sumo stables
- List of sumo elders
- List of active sumo wrestlers
- List of past sumo wrestlers
- List of years in sumo
- Glossary of sumo terms
