= Wakamisugi Akiteru =

Japanese sumo wrestler (1937–1983)

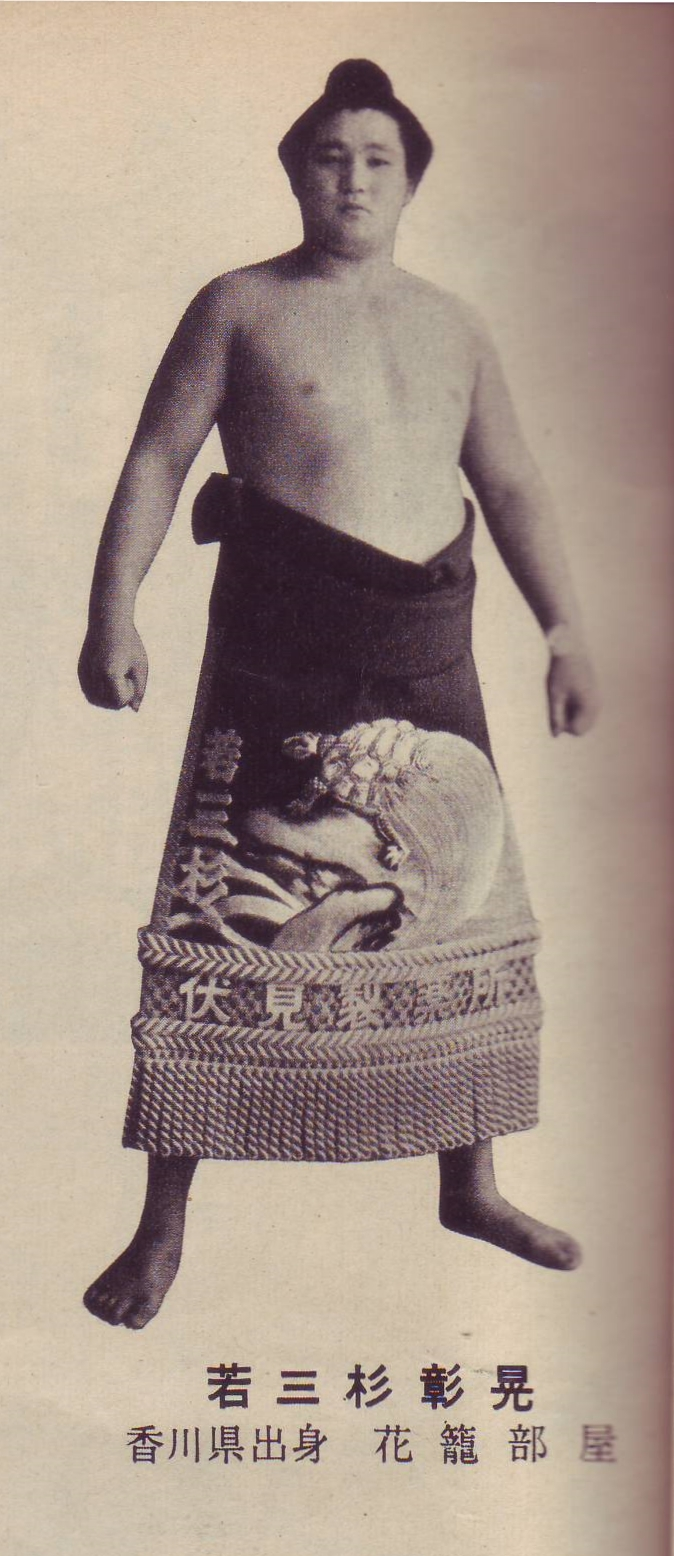

Personal information
- Native name: 若三杉 彰晃
- Born: Noboru Sugiyama; 24 September 1937 Kagawa, Japan
- Died: 2 November 1983 (aged 46)
- Height: 1.88 m (6 ft 2 in)
- Weight: 133 kg (293 lb)

Sport
- Sport: Sumo
- Retired: May, 1967
- Heya: Hanakago
- Record: 444-394-4
- Debut: March, 1955
- Highest rank: Sekiwake (July, 1960)
- Elder name: Araiso
- Championships: 1 (Makuuchi); 1 (Makushita)
- Special Prizes: Outstanding Performance (2); Fighting Spirit (3)
- Gold Stars: 8 Tochinoumi (5); Asashio III; Kashiwado; Sadanoyama
- Updated on June 2020

Wakamisugi Akiteru, also known as Daigō Hisateru, (24 September 1937 – 2 November 1983) was a sumo wrestler from Kagawa, Japan. The highest rank he achieved was sekiwake. He was the brother in law of yokozuna Wakanohana Kanji I.

== Career ==
He was born as Noburu Sugiyama in Marugame. He entered professional sumo in March 1955, recruited by Hanakago stable. He used a variety of different shikona, including his own surname of Sugiyama, Kunikaze and Misugiiso, before adopting the name Wakamisugi when he reached sekitori status upon promotion to the jūryō division in May 1958. He was promoted to the top makuuchi division in November 1958.

He won the top division championship in May 1960 from the rank of maegashira 4. After losing to ōzeki Wakahaguro on the opening day of the tournament he won his next 14 bouts. One of his wins was by default, over yokozuna Tochinishiki who had announced his retirement the previous day. He had a genuine victory over yokozuna Asashio on Day 4. He finished with a 14–1 record, one win ahead of yokozuna Wakanohana, who he did not have to fight as they were members of the same stable. It was his first and only tournament win.

In September 1962 Wakamisugi changed his shikona once again, to Daigō Hisateru. He was a tournament runner-up in November 1962 and November 1965, both times to Taihō. He held the sekiwake rank ten times in total, including seven consecutive tournaments from May 1963 to May 1964. He earned eight kinboshi for defeating yokozuna (most of them coming after he dropped from the sekiwake rank in 1964) and five came from the same yokozuna, Tochinoumi.

== Retirement from sumo ==
He retired in May 1967 and became an elder of the Sumo Association under the name Araiso, working as a coach at Hanakago stable until his death.

== Fighting style ==
Wakamisugi's favoured kimarite or techniques were hidari-yotsu (a right hand outside, left hand inside grip on the mawashi), uwatenage (overarm throw), and yorikiri (force out).

== Career record ==
- The Kyushu tournament was first held in 1957, and the Nagoya tournament in 1958.

Wakamisugi Akiteru
Year	January Hatsu basho, Tokyo	March Haru basho, Osaka	May Natsu basho, Tokyo	July Nagoya basho, Nagoya	September Aki basho, Tokyo	November Kyūshū basho, Fukuoka
1955	x	Shinjo; 2–1	East Jonidan #78; 5–3	Not held	East Jonidan #41; 8–0–P	Not held
1956	West Sandanme #89; 6–2	West Sandanme #21; 7–1	East Sandanme #20; 7–1	Not held	West Makushita #69; 6–2	Not held
1957	East Makushita #56; 4–4	East Makushita #55; 6–2	East Makushita #37; 6–2	Not held	East Makushita #25; 7–1–P	East Makushita #10; 5–3
1958	West Makushita #6; 5–3	West Makushita #2; 7–1–P; Champion	West Jūryō #22; 11–4–P	East Jūryō #13; 11–4	West Jūryō #3; 11–4	West Maegashira #19; 10–5
1959	East Maegashira #13; 7–8	West Maegashira #14; 9–6	East Maegashira #9; 8–7	West Maegashira #7; 8–7	West Maegashira #6; 9–6	East Maegashira #1; 3–12
1960	East Maegashira #8; 7–8	West Maegashira #9; 11–4	West Maegashira #4; 14–1; O★	East Sekiwake #2; 7–8	West Komusubi #1; 9–6	East Komusubi #1; 9–6
1961	East Sekiwake #2; 5–10	East Maegashira #1; 8–7	West Komusubi #2; 7–8	West Maegashira #1; 5–10	East Maegashira #4; 7–8	East Maegashira #5; 11–4; F
1962	West Komusubi #2; 8–7	West Komusubi #1; 6–9	West Maegashira #1; 6–9 ★	West Maegashira #3; 6–9	West Maegashira #5; 5–10	West Maegashira #10; 12–3
1963	West Maegashira #2; 8–7	West Komusubi #1; 9–6	East Sekiwake #1; 8–7	East Sekiwake #1; 9–6	East Sekiwake #1; 8–7	East Sekiwake #1; 8–7
1964	East Sekiwake #1; 9–6; O	East Sekiwake #1; 10–5	East Sekiwake #1; 4–11	East Maegashira #4; 8–7 ★	West Maegashira #2; 5–10	East Maegashira #5; 9–6 ★
1965	West Maegashira #2; 8–7 ★	East Maegashira #1; 9–6; F★	East Komusubi #1; 7–8	West Maegashira #1; 8–7 ★	West Sekiwake #1; 2–13	West Maegashira #6; 12–3; F
1966	East Maegashira #1; 9–6 ★	West Komusubi #1; 7–8	West Maegashira #1; 5–10	East Maegashira #4; 2–9–4	West Maegashira #10; 7–8	East Maegashira #11; 8–7
1967	East Maegashira #7; 6–9	West Maegashira #9; 5–10	West Jūryō #2; Retired; 0–0			
Record given as wins–losses–absences Top division champion Top division runner-up Retired Lower divisions Non-participation Sanshō key: F=Fighting spirit; O=Outstanding performance; T=Technique Also shown: ★=Kinboshi; P=Playoff(s); Divisions: Makuuchi — Jūryō — Makushita — Sandanme — Jonidan — Jonokuchi Makuuchi ranks: Yokozuna — Ōzeki — Sekiwake — Komusubi — Maegashira

== See also ==
- Glossary of sumo terms
- List of sumo tournament top division champions
- List of sumo tournament top division runners-up
- List of past sumo wrestlers
- List of sekiwake
