= Wakanohana Monogatari Dohyō no Oni =

Wakanohana monogatari dohyou no oni
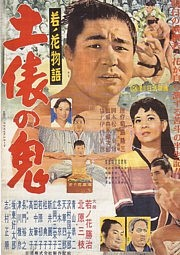
- Japanese movie poster
- Directed by: Kenjiro Morinaga
- Produced by: Nikkatsu
- Release date: 27 December 1956
- Country: Japan
- Language: Japanese

Wakanohana monogatari dohyō no oni (若ノ花物語 土俵の鬼; lit."Wakanohana: the Story of Devil of the Dohyō") is a 1956 black-and-white Japanese film directed by Kenjiro Morinaga.

It is a sport film about sumo wrestler Wakanohana Kanji I. He was nicknamed "Devil of the dohyo" due to his great fighting spirit and endurance.

== Cast ==
- Wakanohana Kanji I as himself
- and others
