= Ōnokuni Yasushi =

Japanese sumo wrestler

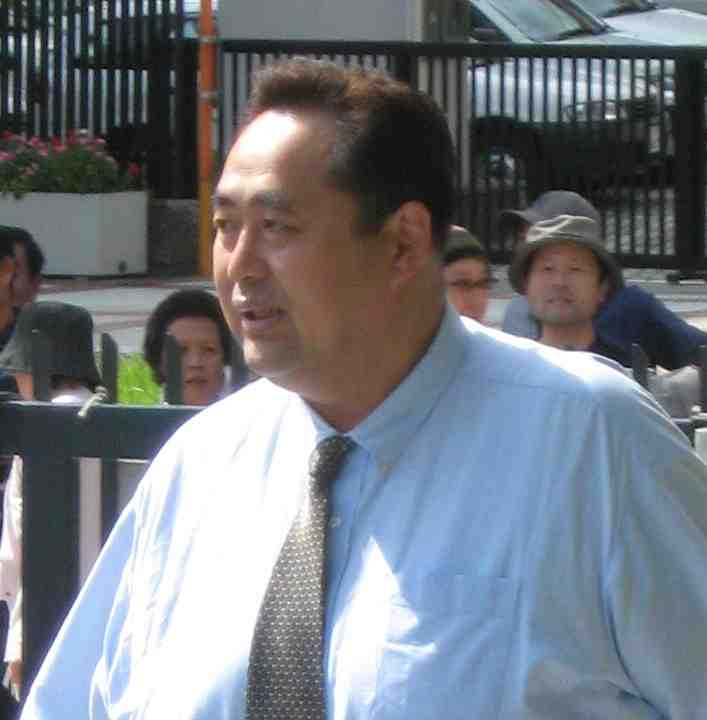
- Ōnokuni, September 2008

Personal information
- Native name: 大乃国 康
- Born: Yasushi Aoki; October 9, 1962 (age 64) Memuro, Hokkaidō, Japan
- Height: 1.89 m (6 ft 2 in)
- Weight: 203 kg (448 lb)

Sport
- Sport: Sumo
- Retired: July 1991
- Heya: Hanakago → Hanaregoma
- Record: 560-319-113
- Debut: March 1978
- Highest rank: Yokozuna (September 1987)
- Elder name: Shibatayama
- Championships: 2 (Makuuchi); 1 (Jūryō)
- Special Prizes: Outstanding Performance (5); Fighting Spirit (2)
- Gold Stars: 4 Takanosato (2); Kitanoumi; Chiyonofuji
- Updated on January 2007

Ōnokuni Yasushi (Japanese: 大乃国 康; born October 9, 1962 as Yasushi Aoki (青木 康)) is a Japanese former professional sumo wrestler from Hokkaidō. Making his professional debut in 1978, he reached the top division in 1983. In 1987 he won his first yūshō or tournament championship with a perfect record and became the sport's 62nd yokozuna. However, he was only able to win one more championship before his retirement in 1991. He has remained in sumo as a coach and in 1999 became the head of Shibatayama stable. He was elected to the Japan Sumo Association's board of directors in 2018.

== Early life ==
Aoki was born in Memuro, Hokkaidō. At school he did judo, but after a sumo tournament in the area, he was recruited to Hanakago stable by Kaiketsu Masateru and fought his first bout in March 1978, aged 15. He took on the shikona, or ring name, of Ōnokuni (大ノ国) in the following tournament. When Kaiketsu set up his Hanaregoma stable in 1981, he took Ōnokuni with him.

== Makuuchi ==
Ōnokuni reached the second jūryō division in March 1982, and the top makuuchi division a year later in March 1983. He made his san'yaku debut at komusubi just three tournaments later. In November 1983, ranked as maegashira 3, he won his first special prize and three gold stars by defeating all three yokozuna (Kitanoumi, Chiyonofuji and Takanosato). This earned him promotion to sekiwake. In March 1984, he changed the spelling of his ring name to 大乃国. In the tournament that month, he defeated three yokozuna and three ōzeki and won special prizes for Fighting Spirit and Outstanding Performance. Ōnokuni was runner-up in the July 1985 tournament, recording 12 wins against 3 losses, enough to secure promotion to ōzeki. He was runner-up again in his ōzeki debut, scoring 12–3 once more.

His performance over the next few tournaments was good but not spectacular, until he won his first tournament in May 1987 with a perfect record of 15 wins and no losses, becoming the first man other than Chiyonofuji to win a top division yūshō in the new Ryōgoku Kokugikan. After two runner-up performances in the next two tournaments, in September of that year he was promoted to yokozuna, sumo's highest rank. His three tournament record of 40 wins and just five losses tied with Wakanohana II as the best produced by a candidate for yokozuna promotion in the six tournaments per year era (post 1958).

== Yokozuna ==
Ōnokuni's first tournament as yokozuna finished with a disappointing 8–7 score, but in March 1988 he beat yokozuna Hokutoumi in a play-off to achieve his second tournament championship. However, the Kokonoe stable yokozuna Chiyonofuji and Hokutoumi were to prove dominant over the next few tournaments and he never won another tournament. He scored a famous victory over Chiyonofuji on the last day of the November 1988 tournament, however, ending Chiyonofuji's 53-bout winning streak in what turned out to be the last sumo match of the Shōwa period.

From 1989 he began to suffer from sleep apnea. He gained weight, peaking at 210 kg (463 lbs) in May 1989, and began to suffer leg problems. He lost some weight through a combination of training and diet, but this weakened him and he never fully recovered.

He missed most of the July tournament due to a knee injury, then in September he became the first yokozuna ever to have make-koshi, or turn in a losing score of just 7 wins out of 15 bouts. He did the only thing expected of him – he offered to resign – but was told by the Japan Sumo Association to soldier on. In his comeback tournament in January 1990, Ōnokuni scraped by with 8 wins but suffered a serious ankle injury and missed the next four tournaments, an unprecedented absence for a yokozuna.

He finally returned to the ring in November 1990, and scored ten wins, defeating Chiyonofuji on the final day. In March 1991 he was runner-up for the seventh and final time in his career, finishing one win behind Hokutoumi on 12–3. His final day defeat to Kirishima handed the yūshō to Hokutoumi and robbed him of the chance of a play-off (which Hokutoumi admitted he would almost certainly have lost as he was injured in his bout the previous day). Ōnokuni missed the following tournament in May due to a fever resulting from a skin infection, and upon his return in July he was defeated four times in the first eight days. He announced his retirement from sumo at the age of just 28 after being beaten by Akinoshima on day 8, leaving a disappointing record of just one yūshō and two runner-up performances in his 23 tournaments at yokozuna rank. He never managed to obtain the highest rank on the banzuke of east yokozuna in any of those tournaments. Discounting the special circumstances of Futahaguro's departure from sumo he was the second youngest yokozuna to retire, after Tochinoumi.

== Retirement from the ring ==
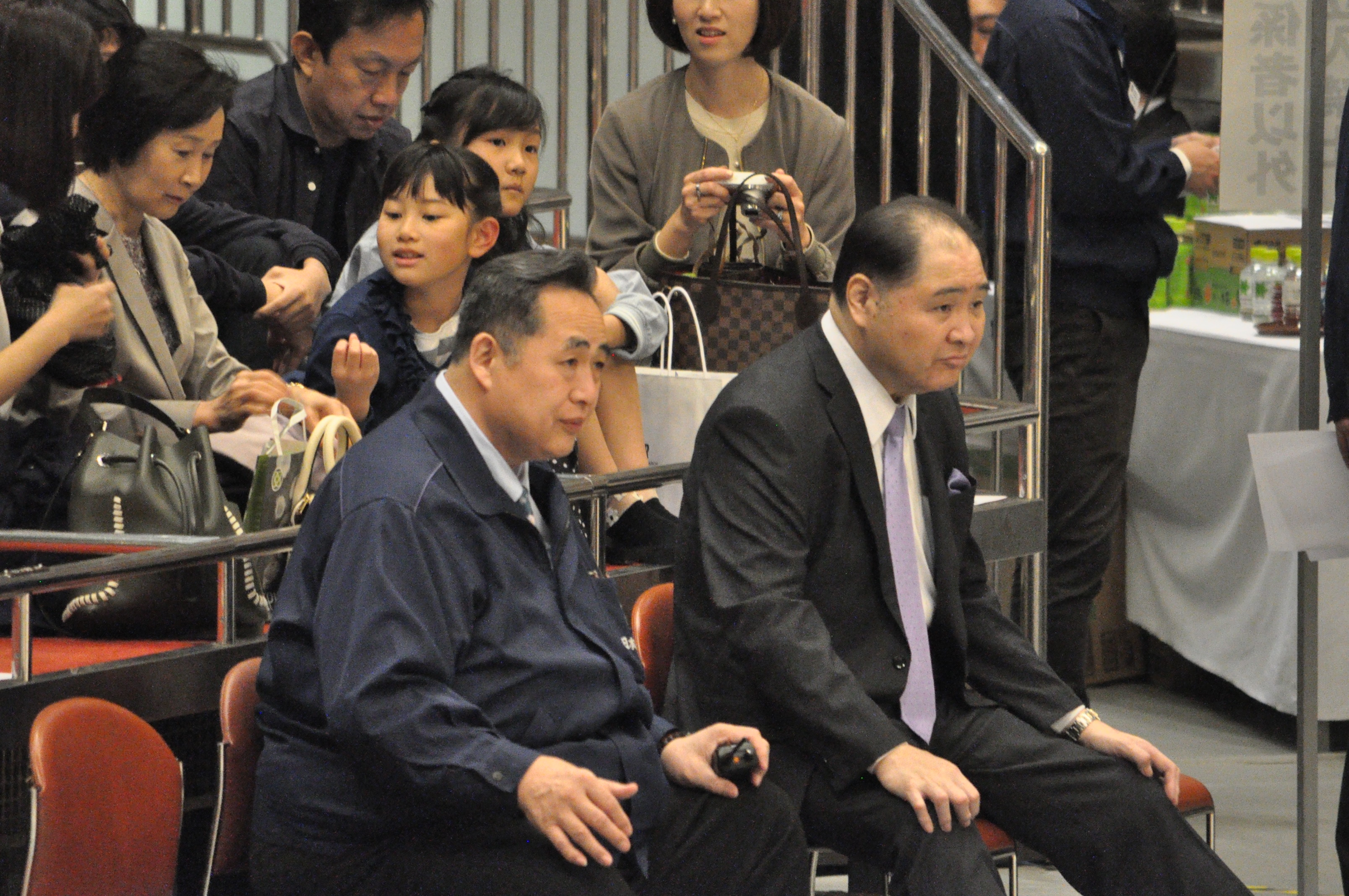
Shibatayama (left) with fellow Sumo Association board member Oguruma in May 2017

Ōnokuni has remained in the sumo world as an oyakata, or elder, and opened his own training stable, Shibatayama-beya in 1999. In March 2008 the stable produced its first sekitori, Daiyūbu, but he spent only one tournament in jūryō and retired suddenly in June 2010 after falling out with his stablemaster. Daiyūbu filed a lawsuit in September claiming that he was slapped and punched, and his topknot was cut off against his will. Shibatayama was questioned by police over the alleged incidents. The case was eventually settled out of court. In March 2016 Shibatayama and one of his wrestlers, Komanokuni, were ordered by the Tokyo District Court to pay 32.4 million yen (287,500 USD) in compensation to another former wrestler who the court ruled had faced "daily abuse" since joining in 2008 and had to undergo four surgeries for a detached retina, eventually losing sight in the eye in 2013. Shibatayama appealed the ruling, and in November 2016 a court-mediated confidential settlement was reached.

In 2013 his old stable closed when Hanaregoma-oyakata reached the mandatory retirement age, and their wrestlers transferred to Shibatayama stable. As of January 2020 the stable has one sekitori, Sakigake. He was elected to the board of directors of the Sumo Association in 2018 and has the role of head of the public relations department.

== Personal life ==
He has been married since 1989.

He has a reputation as a baker of cakes, and often appears on baking shows on television. He published a book 62nd Yokozuna Ōnokuni's National Sweets Tour (第62代横綱大乃国の全国スイーツ巡業). He baked a cake to celebrate Daiyūbu's promotion to jūryō.

His autobiography, titled Winning Even When You Lose, was published in 2008.

== Fighting style ==
Ōnokuni's favoured grip on his opponent's mawashi was migi-yotsu, a left hand outside and right hand inside position. His most common winning kimarite was yori-kiri, which accounted for nearly half his victories at sekitori level. He was also fond of uwatenage, or overarm throw. He had a somewhat defensive style, preferring to wait for his opportunity rather than take the initiative right from the beginning of a bout.

== Career record ==
Ōnokuni Yasushi
Year	January Hatsu basho, Tokyo	March Haru basho, Osaka	May Natsu basho, Tokyo	July Nagoya basho, Nagoya	September Aki basho, Tokyo	November Kyūshū basho, Fukuoka
1978	x	(Maezumo)	West Jonokuchi #15; 4–3	West Jonidan #86; 3–2–2	East Jonidan #99; 5–2	East Jonidan #49; 5–2
1979	West Jonidan #19; 3–4	East Jonidan #32; 5–2	East Jonidan #3; 6–1	West Sandanme #43; 3–4	East Sandanme #53; 2–5	West Sandanme #78; 5–2
1980	West Sandanme #46; 5–2	West Sandanme #12; 4–3	East Sandanme #2; 2–5	East Sandanme #29; 3–4	East Sandanme #46; 4–3	West Sandanme #25; 6–1
1981	West Makushita #49; 3–4	East Sandanme #1; 4–3	West Makushita #48; 5–2	West Makushita #27; 4–3	West Makushita #20; 5–2	East Makushita #8; 5–2
1982	East Makushita #1; 4–3	East Jūryō #11; 5–10	West Makushita #6; 4–3	East Makushita #4; 4–3	West Makushita #1; 5–2	East Jūryō #11; 10–5
1983	West Jūryō #2; 11–4–PP; Champion	West Maegashira #9; 8–7	West Maegashira #2; 6–9	East Maegashira #5; 8–7	West Komusubi #1; 6–9	East Maegashira #3; 10–5; O★★★
1984	East Sekiwake #1; 9–6; O	East Sekiwake #1; 10–5; OF	East Sekiwake #1; 6–9	East Maegashira #1; 10–5; O★	West Sekiwake #1; 10–5	East Sekiwake #1; 8–7
1985	East Sekiwake #1; 9–6	West Sekiwake #1; 9–6	East Sekiwake #1; 10–5; O	East Sekiwake #1; 12–3; F	West Ōzeki #1; 12–3	East Ōzeki #1; 11–4
1986	West Ōzeki #1; 12–3	East Ōzeki #1; 9–6	West Ōzeki #2; 11–4	West Ōzeki #1; 9–6	West Ōzeki #1; 8–7	East Ōzeki #2; 10–5
1987	East Ōzeki #1; 9–6	East Ōzeki #2; 9–6	West Ōzeki #1; 15–0	East Ōzeki #1; 12–3	East Ōzeki #1; 13–2	West Yokozuna #1; 8–7
1988	West Yokozuna #2; 5–5–5	East Yokozuna #2; 13–2–P	West Yokozuna #1; 11–4	East Yokozuna #2; 12–3	West Yokozuna #1; 8–7	West Yokozuna #1; 11–4
1989	West Yokozuna #1; 11–4	East Yokozuna #2; 12–3	West Yokozuna #1; 12–3	West Yokozuna #1; 1–4–10	East Yokozuna #2; 7–8	East Yokozuna #2; Sat out due to injury 0–0–15
1990	East Yokozuna #2; 8–7	East Yokozuna #2; Sat out due to injury 0–0–15	East Yokozuna #2; Sat out due to injury 0–0–15	East Yokozuna #2; Sat out due to injury 0–0–15	West Yokozuna #2; Sat out due to injury 0–0–15	West Yokozuna #2; 10–5
1991	East Yokozuna #2; 10–5	East Yokozuna #2; 12–3	West Yokozuna #1; Sat out due to injury 0–0–15	East Yokozuna #2; Retired; 4–5	x	x
Record given as wins–losses–absences Top division champion Top division runner-up Retired Lower divisions Non-participation Sanshō key: F=Fighting spirit; O=Outstanding performance; T=Technique Also shown: ★=Kinboshi; P=Playoff(s); Divisions: Makuuchi — Jūryō — Makushita — Sandanme — Jonidan — Jonokuchi Makuuchi ranks: Yokozuna — Ōzeki — Sekiwake — Komusubi — Maegashira

== See also ==
- Glossary of sumo terms
- List of sumo tournament top division champions
- List of sumo tournament top division runners-up
- List of sumo tournament second division champions
- List of yokozuna
- List of heaviest sumo wrestlers
- List of past sumo wrestlers
- List of sumo elders

Preceded by Hokutoumi Nobuyoshi	62nd Yokozuna; September 1987 – July 1991	Succeeded by Asahifuji Seiya
Yokozuna is not a successive rank, and more than one wrestler can hold the title at once
