= Ōnoumi Hisamitsu =

Japanese sumo wrestler (1916–1981)

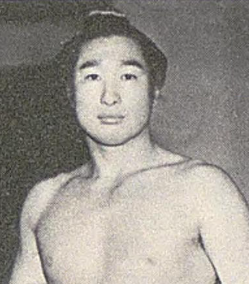

Personal information
- Native name: 大ノ海 久光
- Born: Hisamitsu Kudo; 20 March 1916 Akita Prefecture, Japan
- Died: 20 September 1981 (aged 65)
- Height: 176 cm (5 ft 9 1/2 in)
- Weight: 99.5 kg (219 lb)

Sport
- Sport: Sumo
- Retired: May 1952
- Heya: Nishonoseki
- Record: 172-174-6-3draws
- Debut: January 1937
- Highest rank: Maegashira 3 (January 1950)
- Elder name: Hanakago

Ōnoumi Hisamitsu (大ノ海 久光, Ōnoumi Hisamitsu; 20 March 1916 – 20 September 1981) was a sumo wrestler from Minamiakita District, Akita, Japan.

== Wrestling career ==
He made his professional debut in 1937. He fought in the top makuuchi division for 16 tournaments and his highest rank was maegashira 3. He was a member of Nishonoseki stable and recruited the future yokozuna Wakanohana Kanji I while still an active wrestler.

In 1951 he took part in an exhibition tournament in Los Angeles, the first visit by professional sumo wrestlers to the United States since World War II, alongside Yakatayama, Fujitayama and retired former yokozuna Maedayama.

== Coaching career ==
After his retirement from active competition in 1952 he became an elder of the Japan Sumo Association under the name Hanakago and established the Hanakago stable, taking Wakanohana with him. He was later the coach of yokozuna Wajima, who eventually married Hanakago's daughter and took over control of the stable shortly before Hanakago's death in 1981.

== Personal life ==
In 1982 Ōnoumi’s wife attempted suicide and he was demoted from his position as a judge as a result. The marriage eventually ended in divorce.

== Career record ==
Ōnoumi Hisamitsu
-	Spring Haru basho, Tokyo	Summer Natsu basho, Tokyo	Autumn Aki basho, Tokyo
1937	(Maezumo)	East Jonokuchi #14; 5–2	x
1938	West Jonidan #13; 5–2	East Sandanme #25; 3–4	x
1939	West Sandanme #27; 5–2	East Makushita #41; 5–3	x
1940	West Makushita #21; 3–1	West Makushita #17; 4–4	x
1941	West Makushita #12; 3–5	East Makushita #19; 4–4	x
1942	East Makushita #18; 4–4	East Makushita #10; 7–1	x
1943	West Jūryō #14; 10–5	West Jūryō #5; 6–9	x
1944	East Jūryō #10; 10–5	West Jūryō #3; 7–3	East Maegashira #16; 4–5–1draw
1945	x	West Maegashira #12; 3–4	West Maegashira #17; 5–4–1draw
1946	x	x	West Maegashira #8; 3–10
1947	x	East Maegashira #12; 8–2	East Maegashira #6; 2–9
1948	x	East Maegashira #16; 7–3–1draw	East Maegashira #11; 6–5
1949	East Maegashira #9; 7–6	East Maegashira #8; 5–10	East Maegashira #12; 11–4
1950	West Maegashira #3; 5–10	West Maegashira #8; 7–8	East Maegashira #10; 7–8
1951	East Maegashira #11; 3–12	East Maegashira #18; 5–8–2	West Jūryō #1; Sat out due to injury 0–0–15
1952	West Jūryō #6; 3–12	West Jūryō #13; Retired; 0–0–0	x
Record given as wins–losses–absences Top division champion Top division runner-up Retired Lower divisions Non-participation Sanshō key: F=Fighting spirit; O=Outstanding performance; T=Technique Also shown: ★=Kinboshi; P=Playoff(s); Divisions: Makuuchi — Jūryō — Makushita — Sandanme — Jonidan — Jonokuchi Makuuchi ranks: Yokozuna — Ōzeki — Sekiwake — Komusubi — Maegashira
