= Yahatayama Sadakichi =

Japanese sumo wrestler

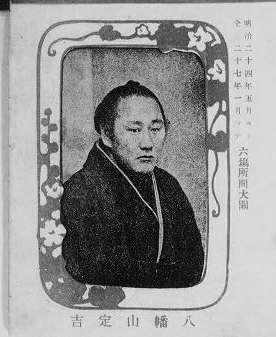

Personal information
- Native name: 八幡山 定吉
- Born: Hirota Sadaji; May 15, 1858 Tosa District, Tosa Province, Japan
- Died: March 11, 1914 (aged 55)
- Height: 1.70 m (5 ft 7 in)
- Weight: 101 kg (223 lb; 15.9 st)

Sport
- Sport: Sumo
- Retired: January, 1894
- Heya: Inagawa → Tamagaki → Ōtake → Negishi → Tomozuna
- Record: 69-32-60-19 draws/10 holds
- Debut: January, 1884
- Highest rank: Ōzeki (May, 1891)
- Elder name: Minatogawa
- Championships: 2 (Makuuchi, unofficial)
- Updated on 14 August 2023

Yahatayama Sadakichi (Japanese: 八幡山 定吉; born Hirota Sadaji (廣田 貞次, Hirota Sadaji), May 15, 1858 – March 11, 1914) was a Japanese professional sumo wrestler from Tosa District, Kōchi (now Kōchi, Kōchi Prefecture). He reached the rank of ōzeki in May 1891 and was the first wrestler from Kōchi Prefecture to be promoted at that rank. He remained the only ōzeki from his home prefecture until the promotion of Kunimiyama in May 1905, 14 years later.

== History ==
Little is known about Yahatayama before he became a professional sumo wrestler (rikishi). He decided to become a wrestler by joining the Osaka-based sumo association and joined the Inagawa stable. However, he never progressed beyond the jonidan division and in 1884 he joined the rival Tokyo-based association with another trainee of Inagawa, Kaizan.

In Tokyo, he first joined Tamagaki stable and made his debut the following month. During his career, he changed stables several times, eventually joining Tomozuna stable on a permanent basis. As a wrestler, he competed with fellow newcomers Konishiki and Nishinoumi, gaining popularity as a talented technical wrestler and being known for his leg tripping based techniques. He rose steadily up the rankings and made his debut in san'yaku in 1890, winning the championship in his first tournament in this position. Promoted to sekiwake for the first tournament of 1891, he was promoted to ōzeki after just one tournament at this rank. In his first tournament at the second-highest rank in the sport, he won his second and final championship. However, as the yūshō system was not introduced until 1909, these championship victories are now considered unofficial. However, Yahatayama began to suffer numerous injuries, including dislocated knees, as a result of his flamboyant style.

Yahatayama retired after the January 1894 tournament, becoming an elder in the Sumo Association under the name Minatogawa. He later broke his ties with his master, leaving Tomozuna stable to train wrestlers from Takasago stable. He later ran a bathhouse in Hiratsuka (Kanagawa Prefecture), but this was in violation of the rules of the association, so he closed down his business and definitively retired. After quitting professional sumo, he returned to his hometown and ran a kimono shop while also helping to promote local sumo tournaments, without success.

Yahatayama died on 11 March 1914 at the age of 55.

== Career record ==
Yahatayama Sadakichi
-	Spring	Summer
1884	Unknown	West Jūryō #9; 4–2; 1h
1885	West Jūryō #4; 3–3; 1h	West Jūryō #4; 4–2; 1h
1886	West Jūryō #1; 7–0; 1d-1h	East Maegashira #6; 5–2–1; 1d-1h
1887	East Maegashira #5; 4–4–1; 1h	East Maegashira #3; 1–3–4; 1d-1h
1888	East Maegashira #5; 3–3–2; 2d	East Maegashira #4; 5–3–1; 1d
1889	East Maegashira #2; 2–2–3; 2d-1h	East Maegashira #3; 5–1–1; 3d
1890	West Maegashira #1; 3–1–2; 4d	West Komusubi #1; 6–1–1; 1d-1h Unofficial
1891	West Sekiwake #1; 6–2–1; 1d	West Ōzeki #1; 6–1–1; 2d Unofficial
1892	West Ōzeki #1; 4–2–3; 1h	West Ōzeki #1; 0–0–10
1893	West Haridashi Ōzeki; 1–0–9	West Haridashi Ōzeki; 0–0–10
1894	West Haridashi Ōzeki; Retired; 0–0–10	x
Record given as win-loss-absent Top Division Champion Top Division Runner-up Retired Lower Divisions Key:d=Draw(s) (引分); h=Hold(s) (預り); Divisions: Makuuchi — Jūryō — Makushita — Sandanme — Jonidan — Jonokuchi Makuuchi ranks: Yokozuna — Ōzeki — Sekiwake — Komusubi — Maegashira

*Championships for the best record in a tournament were not recognized or awarded before the 1909 summer tournament and the above championships that are labelled "unofficial" are historically conferred. For more information see yūshō.

== See also ==
- Glossary of sumo terms
- List of past sumo wrestlers
- List of ōzeki

== Sources ==
=== Further reading ===
- "「大相撲人物大事典」" [Sumo Personalities Encyclopedia]. Sumo Magazine. Baseball Magazine, Inc. January 2001. p. 725. ISBN 9784583036403.
