= Kitanoumi Toshimitsu =

Japanese sumo wrestler (1953–2015)

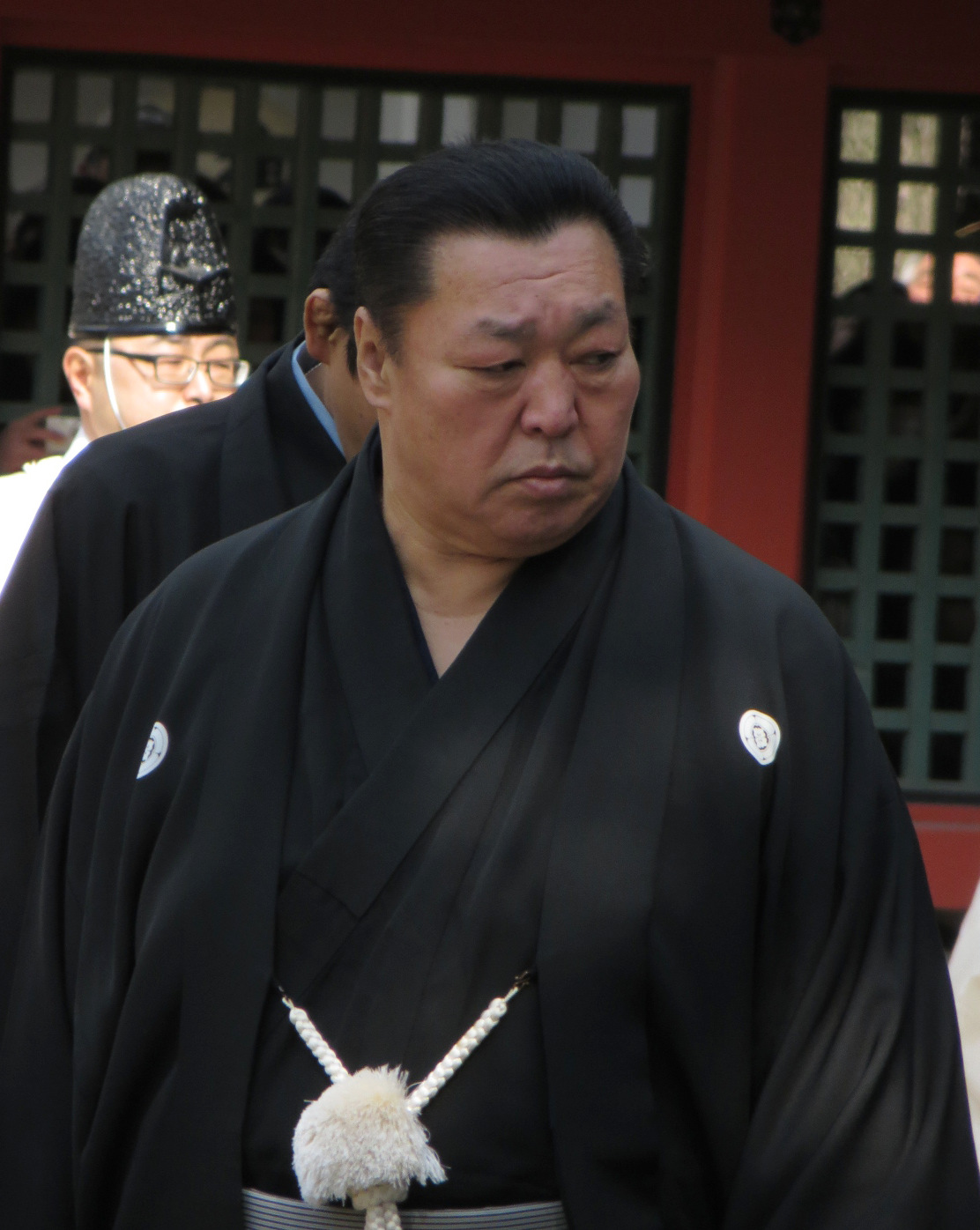
- Kitanoumi in 2013

Personal information
- Native name: 北の湖敏満
- Born: Toshimitsu Obata; May 16, 1953 Sōbetsu, Hokkaido, Japan
- Died: November 20, 2015 (aged 62) Fukuoka, Japan
- Height: 1.79 m (5 ft 10 1/2 in)
- Weight: 169 kg (373 lb; 26.6 st)

Sport
- Sport: Sumo
- Retired: January 1985
- Heya: Mihogaseki
- Record: 951-350-107
- Debut: January 1967
- Highest rank: Yokozuna (July 1974)
- Elder name: Kitanoumi
- Championships: 24 (Makuuchi)
- Special Prizes: Outstanding Performance (2); Fighting Spirit (1)
- Gold Stars: 1 (Kitanofuji)
- Updated on June 2020

Kitanoumi Toshimitsu (Japanese: 北の湖敏満; May 16, 1953 – November 20, 2015), born Toshimitsu Obata (小畑 敏満, Obata Toshimitsu), was a Japanese professional sumo wrestler from Sōbetsu, Hokkaido. He entered professional sumo at the age of 13 and set several youth-related records, including promotion to the highest rank of yokozuna at the age of 21.

Despite being the most dominant wrestler in the sport during the 1970s with 24 tournament championships in his career, he was not popular with fans and was viewed as a villain, earning him the nickname the "Hatefully Strong Yokozuna". At the time of his death he still held the records for most tournaments as yokozuna (63) and most bouts won as a yokozuna (670), but these records have now been surpassed. Following his retirement in 1985 he established the Kitanoumi stable. He was chairman of the Japan Sumo Association from 2002 until 2008, and again from 2012 until his death.

== Career ==
Kitanoumi Toshimitsu was born in Sōbetsu, Hokkaido, on May 16, 1953, the same day that the first live sumo broadcast aired on NHK. He was an athletic child and was taller than his classmates. He was nicknamed the "Prodigy of the North" (北の怪童) and was visited by many sumo scouts. He began his professional sumo career in January 1967 at the age of 13, whilst still in middle school. Kitanoumi joined Mihogaseki stable, and was promoted to sumo's second highest jūryō division in May 1971 and the top makuuchi division a year later. He set several youth-related records, including the youngest to ever reach these two divisions, and the youngest ever promoted to komusubi. He won his first top division yūshō (tournament championship) in January 1974 and was promoted to the ōzeki rank. He secured promotion to the sport's highest rank of yokozuna just three tournaments later. At 21 years and 2 months, he was the youngest ever yokozuna, beating the previous record held by Taihō by one month.

In the 1970s, Kitanoumi was the most successful wrestler in sumo. His dominance, and perceived stern demeanor, had the effect of making him unpopular with the general public. A large reason for this dislike was because Kitanoumi was a strong rival to the popular "Prince of Sumo" Takanohana Kenshi. In September 1975, when Kitanoumi was defeated by Takanohana in a playoff for the championship, the audience threw so many zabuton—or cushions—into the ring in delight, that Kitanoumi said he could "hardly see the ceiling". In matches, he was known for not offering a defeated opponent a hand to get back to their feet. He was also notoriously monosyllabic when being interviewed by reporters. His merciless attitude and immense strength earned him the nickname the "Hatefully Strong Yokozuna" (憎らしいほど強い横綱) and he came to be viewed as the archvillain of sumo. The three most-watched sumo television broadcasts in history are all final-day matches where Kitanoumi lost to popular wrestlers; the third being November 1978 to Wakanohana, the second-most is March 1975 to Takanohana, and the first is January 1981 against Chiyonofuji.

Kitanoumi's best year was 1978, when he won five of the six tournaments and won 82 out of a possible 90 bouts, a record that stood until 2005. His chief rival during these years was fellow yokozuna Wajima. Kitanoumi was heavy at 169 kg, was extremely strong and had excellent balance. He was also remarkably injury free and rarely missed a tournament. From July 1973 until September 1981 he chalked up 50 consecutive kachi-koshi, or tournament records of at least eight wins out of 15, which was a record for the top division until 2015, when Hakuhō reached 51 consecutive kachi-koshi.

By the beginning of the 1980s he had a new rival, Chiyonofuji, who earned promotion to ōzeki and then yokozuna by defeating him in decisive matches in January and July 1981. In November 1981, Kitanoumi withdrew from a tournament for the first time due to injuring his right knee. After that his record was patchy, with many absences. In 1983, he sat out three-straight tournaments due to ligament damage in his left knee and a lower back injury. His 24th and final title came in May 1984, with a perfect 15–0 record. This was seen by many as a fitting end to a great career and he wanted to retire after that tournament, but was persuaded by the Sumo Association to carry on until the opening of the new Ryōgoku Kokugikan stadium in January 1985. Three days into the tournament, without winning a match, he announced his retirement. He had been ranked as a yokozuna on the banzuke in 63 tournaments, which remained the most in history until Hakuhō surpassed it in May 2018. During his career he had won 951 matches, the most in history at the time (he was overtaken by Ōshio in 1987). Of those victories, 804 came in the top division (a record broken by Chiyonofuji in 1991), and 670 of those came at the yokozuna rank.

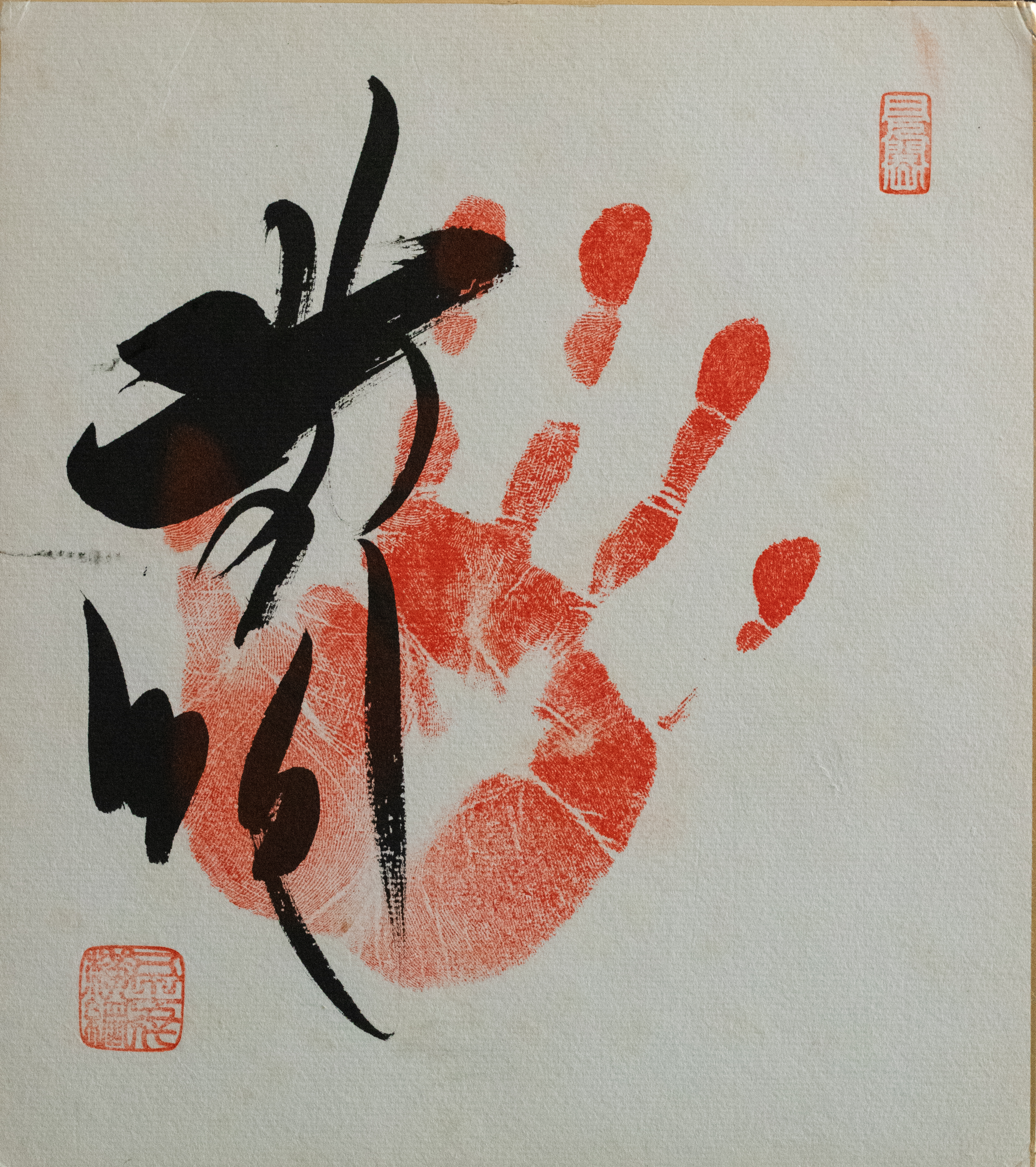
A Kitanoumi tegata (handprint and signature)

== After retirement ==
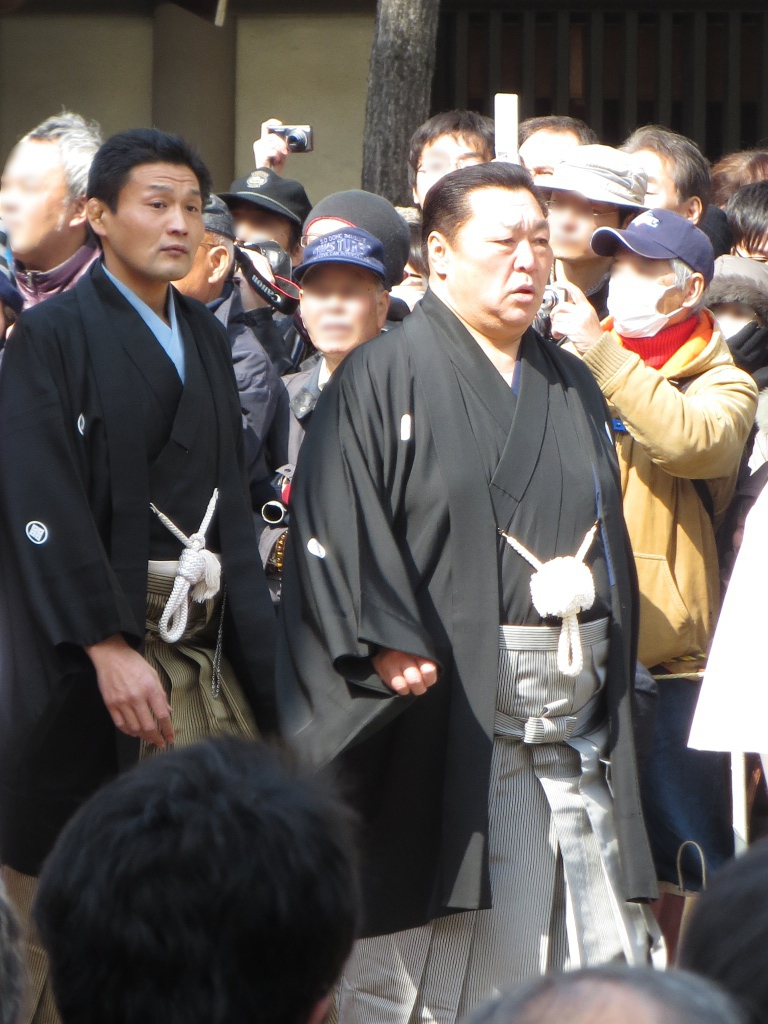
Kitanoumi (right) with Takanohana Koji in 2013

Kitanoumi was honored for his great achievements by being offered membership of the Japan Sumo Association without having to purchase a share (ichidai toshiyori). He was the second rikishi after Taihō to be given this honor. As a result, he was able to keep his sumo name after retirement. He opened up his own training stable, Kitanoumi stable, taking several wrestlers from Mihogaseki stable who had already been under his wing. Kitanoumi stable became one of the largest in sumo, and produced a handful of top division wrestlers over the years, such as maegashira Ganyū, Kitazakura and Kitataiki. He also inherited Russian wrestler Hakurozan, who joined the stable in 2006.

In 2002 Kitanoumi became head of the Sumo Association. He was the first chairman under the age of 50 in half a century, and his appointment was widely welcomed; however, he came under pressure after a series of scandals hit sumo. These included the behavior of yokozuna Asashōryū, who was suspended for two tournaments in 2007 but then allowed to return to Mongolia, the death of junior wrestler Tokitaizan at Tokitsukaze stable, and the dismissal of several top wrestlers for using cannabis. When it became clear in September 2008 that one of them was his own wrestler Hakurozan, whom he had previously backed, Kitanoumi resigned his post, apologizing for "the trouble I have caused to the Sumo Association and to fans". He remained on the board of directors, in charge of running the Osaka tournament, but had to resign from that position in April 2011 after another of his wrestlers, Kiyoseumi, was found guilty of match-fixing and forced to retire from sumo. After Hanaregoma stepped down in February 2012, Kitanoumi returned to the role of chairman, becoming the first person to head the association twice.

== Death ==
Kitanoumi died of colorectal cancer and multiple organ failure on the evening of November 20, 2015. He was in Fukuoka for the November sumo tournament and was taken to the hospital for anemia in the morning, after which his condition deteriorated. A memorial service was held on December 22 at the Ryōgoku Kokugikan.

== Fighting style ==
Kitanoumi preferred to grip his opponent's belt (yotsu-zumō) over pushing and thrusting. His favored grip was hidari-yotsu (the right hand outside of the opponent's arm and the left hand inside holding the opponent's mawashi). His most common winning techniques (kimarite) were yorikiri (frontal force out), oshidashi (frontal push out), and uwatenage (overarm throw). He did not employ a wide variety of winning techniques, using only twenty-one different kimarite over the course of his career.

== Career record ==
Kitanoumi Toshimitsu
Year	January Hatsu basho, Tokyo	March Haru basho, Osaka	May Natsu basho, Tokyo	July Nagoya basho, Nagoya	September Aki basho, Tokyo	November Kyūshū basho, Fukuoka
1967	(Maezumo)	East Jonokuchi #13; 5–2	East Jonidan #95; 4–3	West Jonidan #49; 2–5	West Jonidan #82; 4–3	West Jonidan #55; 4–3
1968	West Jonidan #36; 7–0–PP	West Sandanme #20; 0–7	West Sandanme #64; 6–1	West Sandanme #31; 2–5	East Sandanme #55; 4–3	East Sandanme #39; 6–1
1969	East Sandanme #5; 6–1	East Makushita #38; 2–5	West Makushita #56; 4–3	East Makushita #51; 5–2	West Makushita #30; 3–4	East Makushita #37; 4–3
1970	East Makushita #29; 5–2	East Makushita #16; 4–3	West Makushita #13; 4–3	West Makushita #10; 5–2	East Makushita #3; 2–5	West Makushita #10; 5–2
1971	West Makushita #5; 6–1	East Makushita #1; 5–2	East Jūryō #10; 9–6	West Jūryō #4; 6–9	West Jūryō #8; 9–6	West Jūryō #2; 9–6
1972	East Maegashira #12; 5–10	West Jūryō #3; 10–5	West Maegashira #11; 9–6	East Maegashira #7; 9–6	East Maegashira #3; 6–9	West Maegashira #6; 10–5
1973	East Komusubi #1; 4–11	West Maegashira #5; 9–6; F	West Maegashira #1; 6–9 ★	East Maegashira #4; 8–7	East Komusubi #1; 8–7	East Sekiwake #1; 10–5; O
1974	East Sekiwake #1; 14–1; O	East Ōzeki #1; 10–5	East Ōzeki #1; 13–2	East Ōzeki #1; 13–2–P	West Yokozuna #1; 11–4	West Yokozuna #1; 12–3–P
1975	East Yokozuna #1; 12–3	East Yokozuna #1; 13–2–P	East Yokozuna #1; 13–2	East Yokozuna #1; 9–6	East Yokozuna #1; 12–3–P	East Yokozuna #1; 12–3
1976	East Yokozuna #1; 13–2	East Yokozuna #1; 10–5	West Yokozuna #1; 13–2–P	West Yokozuna #1; 12–3	West Yokozuna #1; 10–5	West Yokozuna #1; 14–1
1977	East Yokozuna #1; 12–3	West Yokozuna #1; 15–0	East Yokozuna #1; 12–3	East Yokozuna #1; 13–2	West Yokozuna #1; 15–0	East Yokozuna #1; 13–2
1978	West Yokozuna #1; 15–0	East Yokozuna #1; 13–2–P	East Yokozuna #1; 14–1–P	East Yokozuna #1; 15–0	East Yokozuna #1; 14–1	East Yokozuna #1; 11–4
1979	East Yokozuna #2; 14–1	East Yokozuna #1; 15–0	East Yokozuna #1; 13–2	West Yokozuna #1; 12–3	West Yokozuna #1; 13–2	East Yokozuna #1; 10–5
1980	East Yokozuna #2; 12–3	West Yokozuna #1; 13–2	East Yokozuna #1; 14–1	East Yokozuna #1; 15–0	East Yokozuna #1; 11–4	West Yokozuna #1; 12–3
1981	East Yokozuna #2; 14–1–P	East Yokozuna #1; 13–2	East Yokozuna #1; 14–1	East Yokozuna #1; 13–2	East Yokozuna-Ōzeki #1; 10–5	West Yokozuna-Ōzeki #1; 5–4–6
1982	West Yokozuna-Ōzeki #1; 13–2	East Yokozuna #1; 11–4	West Yokozuna #1; 9–4–2	East Yokozuna #2; Sat out due to injury 0–0–15	East Yokozuna #2; 10–5	East Yokozuna #2; 9–3–3
1983	West Yokozuna #1; 5–4–6	West Yokozuna #1; Sat out due to injury 0–0–15	West Yokozuna #1; Sat out due to injury 0–0–15	West Yokozuna #1; Sat out due to injury 0–0–15	East Yokozuna #2; 4–1–10	East Yokozuna #2; 11–4
1984	East Yokozuna #2; 8–7	East Yokozuna #2; 10–5	West Yokozuna #1; 15–0	East Yokozuna #1; 11–4	East Yokozuna #1; 0–3–12	East Yokozuna #2; 3–4–8
1985	West Yokozuna #1; Retired; 0–3	x	x	x	x	x
Record given as wins–losses–absences Top division champion Top division runner-up Retired Lower divisions Non-participation Sanshō key: F=Fighting spirit; O=Outstanding performance; T=Technique Also shown: ★=Kinboshi; P=Playoff(s); Divisions: Makuuchi — Jūryō — Makushita — Sandanme — Jonidan — Jonokuchi Makuuchi ranks: Yokozuna — Ōzeki — Sekiwake — Komusubi — Maegashira

== See also ==
- Glossary of sumo terms
- Kanreki dohyō-iri
- List of past sumo wrestlers
- List of sumo record holders
- List of sumo tournament top division champions
- List of sumo tournament top division runners-up
- List of yokozuna

Preceded by Hiroshi Wajima	55th Yokozuna; 1974–1985	Succeeded by Wakanohana Kanji II
Yokozuna is not a successive rank, and more than one wrestler can hold the title at once

Sporting positions
Preceded by Yutakayama Katsuo	Chairman of the Japan Sumo Association; 2002–2008	Succeeded by Mienoumi Tsuyoshi
Preceded by Kaiketsu Masateru	Chairman of the Japan Sumo Association; 2012–2015	Succeeded by Hokutoumi Nobuyoshi
