= Wakanohana Kanji I =

Japanese sumo wrestler

Wakanohana Kanji
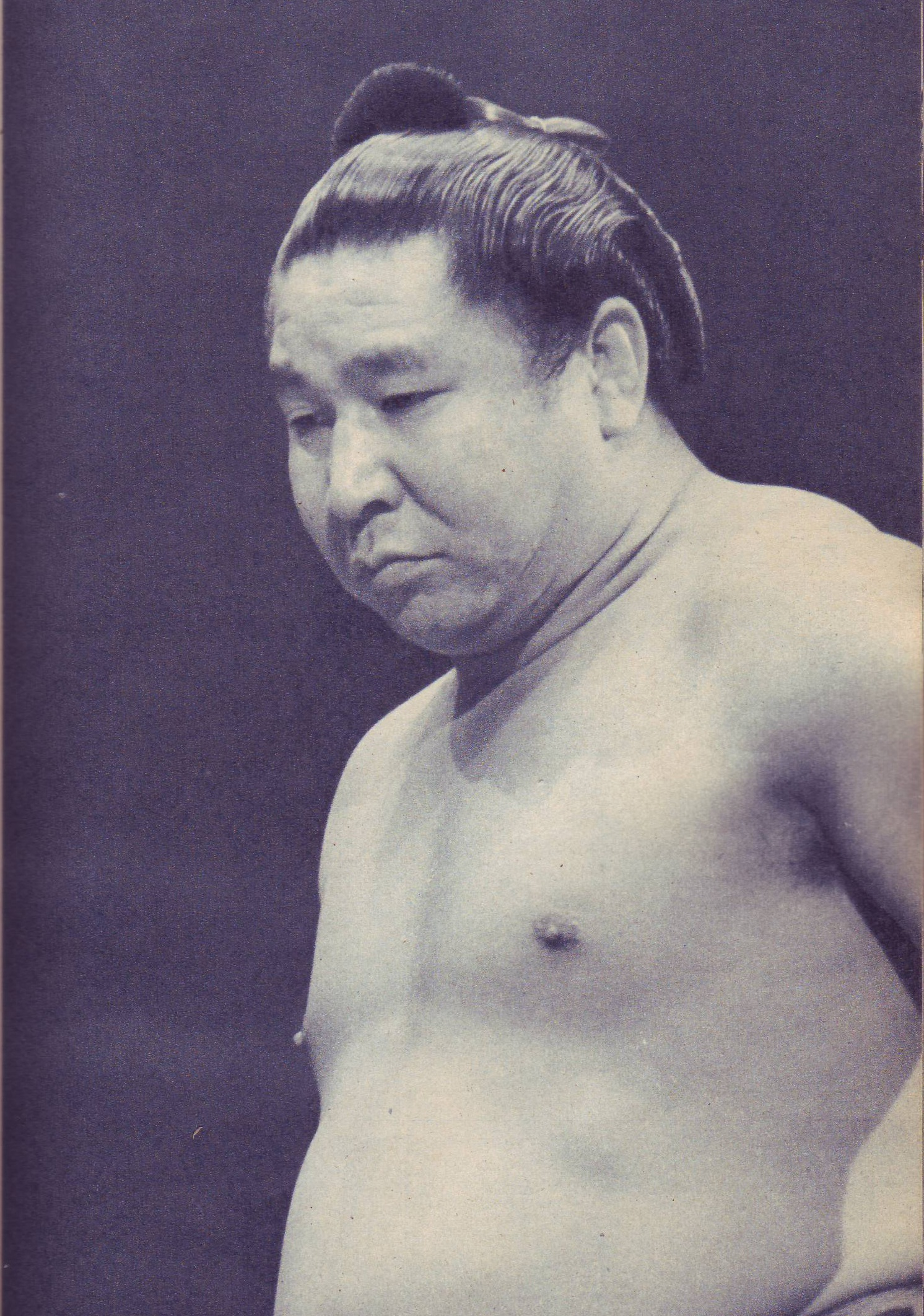
- Wakanohana, 1961

Personal information
- Native name: 若乃花 幹士
- Born: Hanada Katsuji; March 16, 1928 Hirosaki, Aomori Prefecture, Japan
- Died: September 1, 2010 (aged 82) Tokyo, Japan
- Height: 1.79 m (5 ft 10 1/2 in)
- Weight: 105 kg (231 lb)

Sport
- Sport: Sumo
- Retired: May, 1962
- Heya: Nishonoseki, Hanakago
- Record: 593-253-70-4 draws
- Debut: November, 1946
- Highest rank: Yokozuna (January, 1958)
- Elder name: Futagoyama
- Championships: 10 (Makuuchi); 1 (Sandanme); 1 (Jonidan)
- Special Prizes: Outstanding Performance (2); Fighting Spirit (2); Technique (1)
- Gold Stars: 6 Haguroyama (2); Chiyonoyama (2); Azumafuji (2)
- Updated on June 2020

Wakanohana Kanji (Japanese: 若乃花 幹士, Hepburn: Wakanohana Kanji; March 16, 1928 – September 1, 2010) was a Japanese professional sumo wrestler. He was the sport's 45th yokozuna. He was a popular wrestler and was nicknamed the "Devil of the Dohyō" (土俵の鬼, Dohyō no Oni) due to his great fighting spirit and endurance.

Wakanohana's younger brother (by twenty-two years) was the late former ōzeki Takanohana Kenshi and he was the uncle of Wakanohana Masaru and Takanohana Kōji. He won ten top division yūshō or tournament championships during his career and at a fighting weight of around 100 kg was one of the lightest yokozuna ever. He had a long-standing rivalry with Tochinishiki and was one of the most popular wrestlers of the 1950s. After his retirement in 1962 he established Futagoyama stable and was also head of the Japan Sumo Association from 1988 until 1992.

== Career ==
Born Hanada Katsuji (花田 勝治) in Hirosaki, Aomori Prefecture, he moved to Hokkaidō as a child. After working as a stevedore, he was scouted by the maegashira Onoumi, joining Nishonoseki stable in November 1946. He was trained harshly by Rikidōzan in Nishonoseki stable, and reportedly bit Rikidōzan's leg in retaliation for his training. He began sumo with the shikona or ring name Wakanohana Yoshimi (若ノ花 義美), before changing its given name to his real one in May 1948. Onoumi became head coach of Shibatayama stable after his retirement in May 1952, and Wakanohana followed him to the new stable. It was renamed Hanakago stable in September 1953.

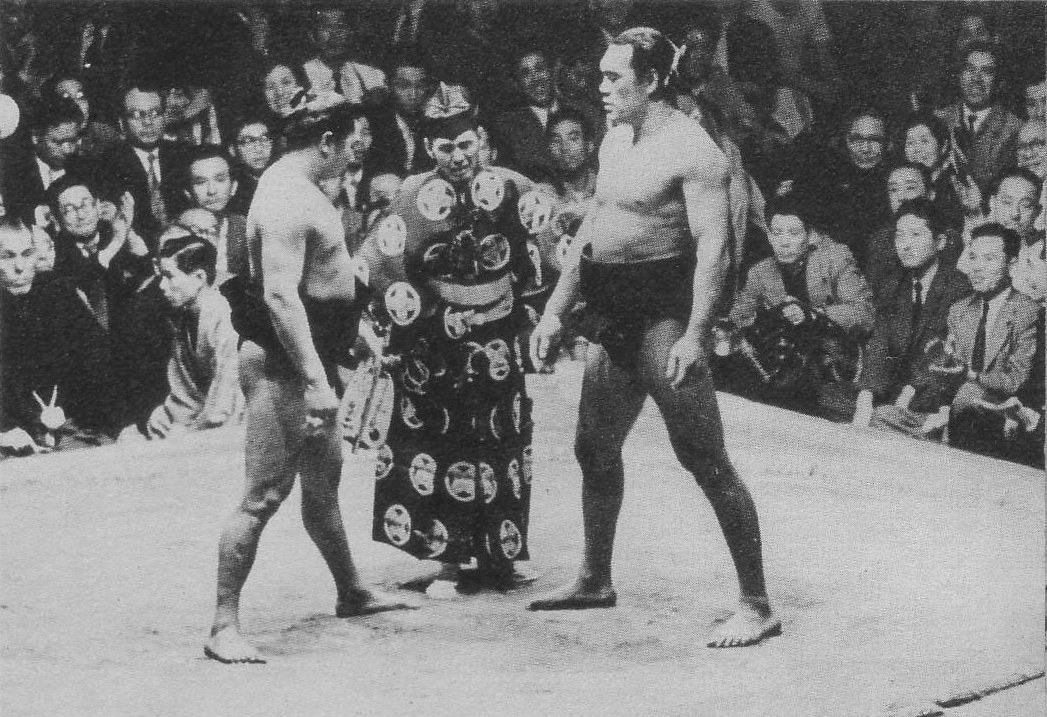
Wakanohana and Chiyonoyama take a break during their 17-minute draw in September 1955

Wakanohana reached the top division in 1950. In September 1955 he fought a bout against yokozuna Chiyonoyama that lasted for over 17 minutes before being declared a draw. In contrast, most sumo matches are over in a few seconds. He was promoted to ōzeki after that tournament. In March 1956 he took part in a three-way playoff for the championship, the first of its kind in makuuchi. Although he won over maegashira Wakahaguro, he would then lose against sekiwake Asashio, who in turn would beat Wakahaguro to secure the title.The next tournament in May 1956, Wakanohana won his first top division championship.

Shortly before the following tournament his four-year-old eldest son Katsuo was scalded to death when a boiling hot pot of chankonabe fell on him. Despite being devastated by the tragedy, Wakanohana chose to compete in the tournament but ended up dropping out with a fever. He changed the spelling of his ring surname in September 1957, and adopted the given name Kanji in May 1958.

Wakanohana was promoted to yokozuna in January 1958, shortly after he took his second tournament championship. He was the first yokozuna produced by the Nishonoseki ichimon or group of stables in over 20 years and consequently had to borrow the keshō-mawashi of the former Futabayama to perform his first yokozuna dohyō-iri or ring entering ceremony.

Wakanohana's great rival as yokozuna was Tochinishiki. They were very evenly matched, being of similar height and weight, and both ended up with ten top division titles each. In March 1960, they faced each other undefeated on the final day – the first time ever that two yokozuna had met like this. Wakanohana won the match and Tochinishiki retired after the next tournament. Wakanohana kept going until the new era of yokozuna Taihō and Kashiwado, retiring in May 1962.

Wakanohana was such a popular wrestler that he even starred in a feature film about his life, Wakanohana Monogatari Dohyō no Oni made by Nikkatsu and released across Japan on December 27, 1956.

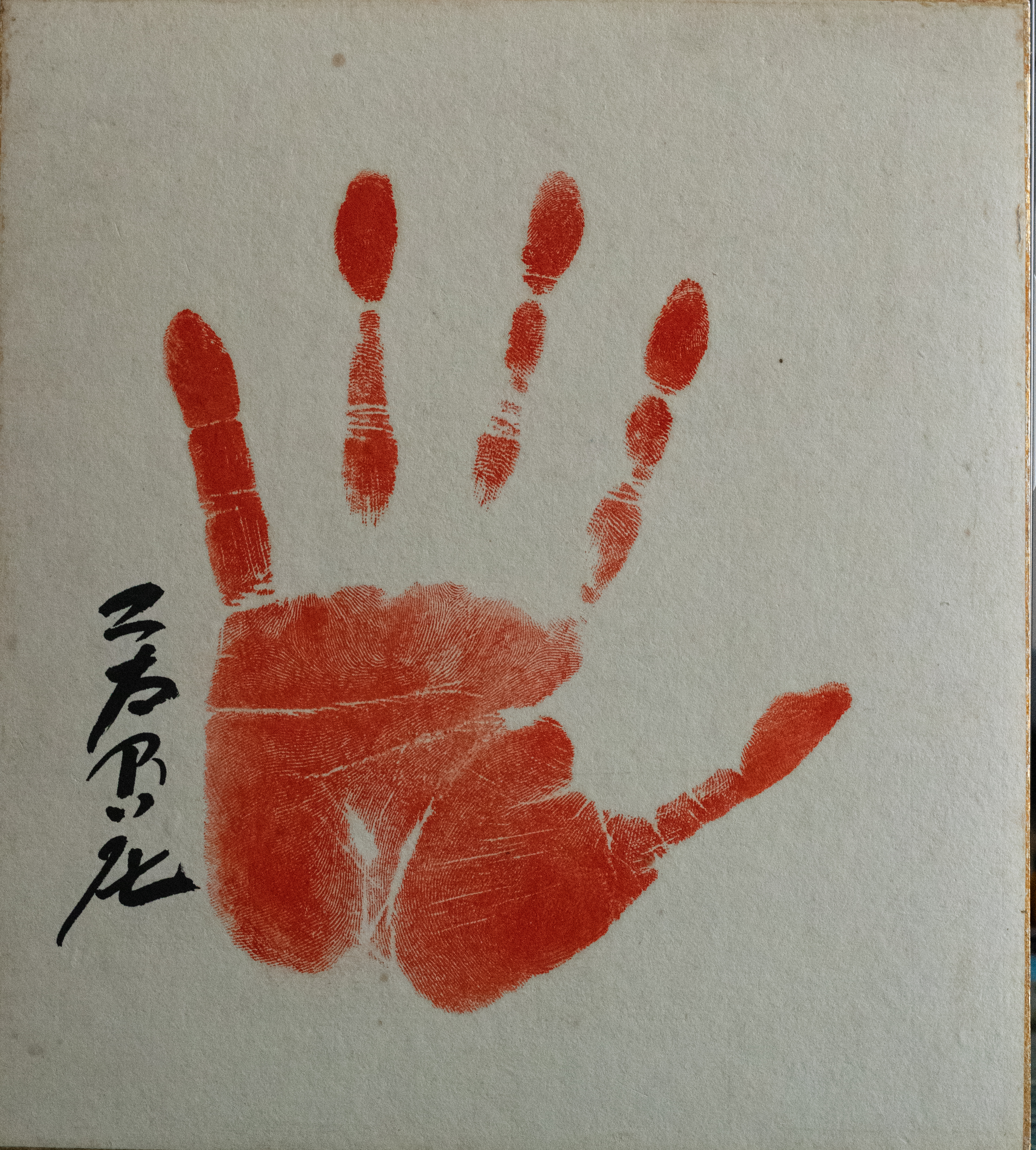
Wakanohana I original tegata (Handprint & signature)

== Retirement from sumo ==
After retirement he set up his own training stable, Futagoyama, which produced a string of top wrestlers, including ōzeki Takanohana (his brother) and Wakashimazu, and yokozuna Wakanohana II and Takanosato. He was also head of the Japan Sumo Association from 1988 to 1992. Among his reforms was an attempt to improve the quality of the tachi-ai or initial charge of a bout by fining wrestlers who engaged in matta, or false starts, beginning in September 1991. In his first year as head of the Association, he also performed his kanreki dohyō-iri or '60th year ring entrance ceremony' to commemorate his years as yokozuna. At the end of his last tournament in charge he presented the Emperor's Cup to his nephew, Takahanada, who had become the youngest ever top division tournament winner. Upon his retirement from the Sumo Association in 1993, his stable merged with his brother's Fujishima stable. He became director of the Sumo Museum. He died of kidney cancer in September 2010 at the age of 82. Umegatani I, who lived to 83, is the only yokozuna to live longer than him.

== Fighting style ==
Wakanohana was a noted technician, and his trademark was his overarm throwing techniques. As well as uwatenage and dashinage he was also well known for yobimodoshi, or pulling body slam, a kimarite that has virtually disappeared from professional sumo today. He was equally adept at both a hidari-yotsu (right hand outside, left hand inside) and migi-yotsu (the reverse) grip on his opponent's mawashi.

== Pre-modern top division record ==
- The New Year tournament began and the Spring tournament returned to Osaka in 1953.

Wakanohana Kanji
-	Spring Haru basho, Tokyo	Summer Natsu basho, Tokyo	Autumn Aki basho, Tokyo
1950	West Maegashira #18; 11–4; F	East Maegashira #9; 10–5	East Maegashira #4; 4–11
1951	East Maegashira #7; 11–4; F	East Maegashira #1; 8–7 ★	East Komusubi #1; 7–8
1952	West Komusubi #2; 5–10	West Maegashira #4; 5–10	West Maegashira #9; 10–5
Record given as wins–losses–absences Top division champion Top division runner-up Retired Lower divisions Non-participation Sanshō key: F=Fighting spirit; O=Outstanding performance; T=Technique Also shown: ★=Kinboshi; P=Playoff(s); Divisions: Makuuchi — Jūryō — Makushita — Sandanme — Jonidan — Jonokuchi Makuuchi ranks: Yokozuna — Ōzeki — Sekiwake — Komusubi — Maegashira

-	New Year Hatsu basho, Tokyo	Spring Haru basho, Osaka	Summer Natsu basho, Tokyo	Autumn Aki basho, Tokyo
1953	West Maegashira #3; 8–7 ★★★	East Maegashira #1; 8–7 ★	East Maegashira #1; 8–7 ★	West Komusubi #1; 8–7
1954	West Sekiwake #1; 8–7; O	East Sekiwake #1; 9–6	East Sekiwake #1; 9–6	West Sekiwake #1; 11–4; O
1955	East Sekiwake #1; 7–7–1draw	West Sekiwake #1; 10–4–1draw	West Sekiwake #1; 8–7	West Sekiwake #1; 10–4–1draw T
1956	East Ōzeki #2; 13–2	East Ōzeki #1; 12–3–PP	East Ōzeki #1; 12–3–P	East Ōzeki #1; 12–2–1
Record given as wins–losses–absences Top division champion Top division runner-up Retired Lower divisions Non-participation Sanshō key: F=Fighting spirit; O=Outstanding performance; T=Technique Also shown: ★=Kinboshi; P=Playoff(s); Divisions: Makuuchi — Jūryō — Makushita — Sandanme — Jonidan — Jonokuchi Makuuchi ranks: Yokozuna — Ōzeki — Sekiwake — Komusubi — Maegashira

== Modern top division tournament record ==
- Since the addition of the Kyushu tournament in 1957 and the Nagoya tournament in 1958, the yearly schedule has remained unchanged.

Year	January Hatsu basho, Tokyo	March Haru basho, Osaka	May Natsu basho, Tokyo	July Nagoya basho, Nagoya	September Aki basho, Tokyo	November Kyūshū basho, Fukuoka
1957	East Ōzeki #1; 11–4	East Ōzeki #1; 10–5	East Ōzeki #1; 11–4	Not held	East Ōzeki #1; 11–4	East Ōzeki #1; 12–3
1958	East Ōzeki #1; 13–2	East Yokozuna #2; 12–3	West Yokozuna #1; 11–4	East Yokozuna #2; 13–2	East Yokozuna #1; 14–1	East Yokozuna #1; 12–2–1draw
1959	East Yokozuna #1; 14–1	East Yokozuna #1; 12–3	East Yokozuna #2; 14–1–P	West Yokozuna-Ōzeki #1; 11–4	West Yokozuna-Ōzeki #1; 14–1	East Yokozuna #1; 11–4
1960	West Yokozuna #1; 0–3–12	East Yokozuna #2; 15–0	East Yokozuna #1; 13–2	East Yokozuna #1; 13–2	East Yokozuna #1; 13–2	East Yokozuna #1; 5–4–6
1961	West Yokozuna #1; 12–3	East Yokozuna #1; Sat out due to injury 0–0–15	West Yokozuna #1; 10–5	East Yokozuna #1; 3–4–8	West Yokozuna #1; 10–5	East Yokozuna #1; 11–4
1962	East Yokozuna #2; 11–4	West Yokozuna #1; 0–2–13	East Yokozuna #2; Retired; 0–0	x	x	x
Record given as wins–losses–absences Top division champion Top division runner-up Retired Lower divisions Non-participation Sanshō key: F=Fighting spirit; O=Outstanding performance; T=Technique Also shown: ★=Kinboshi; P=Playoff(s); Divisions: Makuuchi — Jūryō — Makushita — Sandanme — Jonidan — Jonokuchi Makuuchi ranks: Yokozuna — Ōzeki — Sekiwake — Komusubi — Maegashira

== See also ==
- Glossary of sumo terms
- Kanreki dohyō-iri
- List of past sumo wrestlers
- List of sumo tournament top division champions
- List of sumo tournament top division runners-up
- List of yokozuna

Preceded by Tochinishiki Kiyotaka	45th Yokozuna; 1958–1962	Succeeded by Asashio Tarō III
Yokozuna is not a successive rank, and more than one wrestler can hold the title at once

Sporting positions
Preceded by Tochinishiki Kiyotaka	Chairman of the Japan Sumo Association; 1988–1992	Succeeded by Sadanoyama Shinmatsu
