= Wajima Hiroshi =

Japanese sumo wrestler

Personal information
- Native name: 輪島大士
- Born: Hiroshi Wajima (輪島博); 11 January 1948 Nanao, Ishikawa, Japan
- Died: 8 October 2018 (aged 70)
- Height: 1.85 m (6 ft 1 in)
- Weight: 130 kg (287 lb)

Sport
- Sport: Sumo
- University team: Nihon University
- Retired: March 1981
- Heya: Hanakago
- Record: 673–234–85
- Debut: January 1970
- Highest rank: Yokozuna (May 1973)
- Elder name: Hanakago
- Championships: 14 (Makuuchi); 1 (Jūryō); 2 (Makushita)
- Special Prizes: Outstanding Performance (3); Fighting Spirit (2)
- Updated on June 2020

Hiroshi Wajima (Japanese: 輪島大士, Hepburn: Wajima Hiroshi; 11 January 1948 – 8 October 2018) was a Japanese sumo and professional wrestler. Born in Nanao, Ishikawa, he was the sport's 54th yokozuna and is the first wrestler with a collegiate background to reach its highest rank. Entering professional sumo in January 1970, he won a total of 14 tournament championships or yūshō during his career before retiring in March 1981. He was nicknamed "Golden Left" (黄金の左, Ōgon no Hidari) in reference to his trademark gold mawashi and his preferred technique of a left-handed underarm throw. He was later head coach of Hanakago stable, but after several controversies, Wajima was forced to leave the sumo world and turned to professional wrestling, retiring in 1988.

== Sumo career ==
After graduating from Nihon University where he was twice the amateur sumo champion in 1968 and 1969, he made his professional debut in January 1970 at the age of 22, joining Hanakago stable. He was given makushita tsukedashi status, meaning he could begin in the third highest makushita division. He was undefeated in his first 14 matches and reached the jūryō division after just two tournaments. At the time, this marked the fastest rise to the second division in sumo history. He was promoted to the top makuuchi division in January 1971.

After finishing as runner-up in the November 1971 and January 1972 tournaments he was promoted to sekiwake and took his first top division yūshō or championship in May 1972. He was promoted to ōzeki shortly afterwards and after winning his second championship with a perfect 15–0 score in May 1973 he was promoted to yokozuna. He won his first championship as a yokozuna in September, and in November 1973 he became the first wrestler ever to withdraw from a tournament while still managing to win it. He had split the webbing between his fingers in his Day 12 win over Takanohana, and lost the next day with his hand bandaged. As his only challengers on Day 13 had a fourth loss, he was able to sit out the last two days and still win the championship with a 12–2–1 record.

Wajima won three championships in 1974 but then went into a slump, and did not take another title until March 1976. In the late 1970s he was somewhat overshadowed by fellow yokozuna Kitanoumi, five years his junior. While Wajima had had a good personal record against him, holding a 19–10 advantage up to the end of 1977, Kitanoumi began to win their later encounters and overtook him in terms of championships won. Wajima's final record against him was 23-21. He took his fourteenth and final championship in November 1980, and retired in March 1981. At the time, he held the third highest number of top division yūshō in history, behind only Kitanoumi and Taihō.

Wajima was an unconventional wrestler in many ways, and was looked on as a contrast to the strong and silent Kitanoumi. He was the only man ever to reach yokozuna without adopting a traditional shikona, instead fighting under his real name of Hiroshi Wajima throughout his entire career; although he did use different kanji to spell his given name. He was the first wrestler with a collegiate background to be promoted to yokozuna. He was nicknamed the "Sumo Genius" because of his college background. His other departures from sumo norms included having his hair permed before growing a topknot, staying in luxury hotels and driving a Lincoln Continental whilst on regional sumo tours (jungyō), and associating himself with outsiders such as the yakuza and going out on late-night drinking sessions.

He was a great friend and rival of Takanohana, whom he had known since his university days. The two were promoted to ōzeki simultaneously in November 1972.

=== Fighting style ===
Wajima's preferred grip on the mawashi was hidari-yotsu (left hand inside, right hand outside), and he was famed for the power of his so-called "golden left" arm which he would use to down his opponents by shitatenage (underarm throw). His other favourite kimarite included yorikiri (frontal force out) and tsuridashi (frontal lift out).

=== Retirement from sumo ===
Following his retirement Wajima took over as oyakata, or head coach, of Hanakago stable in 1981, having married the eldest daughter of the previous stablemaster (former maegashira Onoumi) who had reached the mandatory retirement age for elders of 65. However, his time there as oyakata was controversial. He lacked leadership qualities and most unusually did not even live in the stable, preferring to commute. Hanakago declined to the point when it did not have any top-division wrestlers left. In 1982 his wife attempted suicide and he was demoted from his position as a judge as a result. The marriage eventually ended in divorce. In 1985 he was pressured by fellow oyakata to resign from the Sumo Association after it emerged that he was heavily in debt due to the failure of his chankonabe restaurant and had put up his share in the Association as collateral on a loan, a practice strictly forbidden. The stable folded completely with all its wrestlers transferring to the affiliated Hanaregoma stable.

== Professional wrestling career ==
To pay off his debts, Wajima turned to pro wrestling. Shohei Baba, owner of All Japan Pro Wrestling, convinced him to join his promotion and train at their dojo. He debuted in 1986. Because of his status as a former yokozuna (the first since Kinichi Azumafuji to turn to pro wrestling), Wajima was pushed as a superstar, feuding with Stan Hansen over the PWF Heavyweight Championship. He also wrestled in North America for American Wrestling Association in Minnesota and Jim Crockett Promotions in the Mid-Atlantic. In the long run, however, accumulated injuries from his sumo years limited his potential as a professional wrestler, and he ended up retiring from the game altogether in 1988. His last recorded match was held 16 December, as he and The Great Kabuki defeated Jerry Blackwell and Phil Hickerson. His wrestling career helped him with his debts, and soon he was in good terms with the Sumo Association.

== Later career ==
After retiring as a wrestler, Wajima coached the X-League American football team Gakusei-Engokai Rocbull and also worked with the Cuban national sumo team. He was also Ishikawa Prefecture's tourist ambassador. In January 2009 he returned to the Ryōgoku Kokugikan for the first time since leaving the Sumo Association in 1985, and was a guest of NHK, commentating on the day's bouts with his close friend Demon Kogure. The previous year, Wajima played the father in the short film Kona Nishite Fū (コナ・ニシテ・フウ), which Demon wrote and directed.

== Illness and death ==
In 2013, he was diagnosed with pharyngeal cancer and underwent surgery that December, which led to him losing his voice. He attended the wedding reception of Toyohibiki in February 2016 (whose stablemaster Sakaigawa Oyakata was a fellow Nihon University alumnus) and reported that while he had difficulty speaking, he was able to remain physically active, going for a 50-minute walk every day.

Wajima died at his home in Tokyo on 8 October 2018. He was 70 years old.

== Career record ==
Wajima Hiroshi
Year	January Hatsu basho, Tokyo	March Haru basho, Osaka	May Natsu basho, Tokyo	July Nagoya basho, Nagoya	September Aki basho, Tokyo	November Kyūshū basho, Fukuoka
1970	Makushita tsukedashi #60; 7–0; Champion	East Makushita #8; 7–0; Champion	East Jūryō #8; 10–5	East Jūryō #4; 7–8	West Jūryō #6; 13–2; Champion	East Jūryō #1; 9–6
1971	West Maegashira #11; 9–6	West Maegashira #5; 5–10	East Maegashira #12; 11–4; F	West Maegashira #2; 6–9	East Maegashira #6; 10–5	East Maegashira #1; 11–4; F
1972	East Komusubi #1; 10–5; O	West Sekiwake #1; 9–6	West Sekiwake #1; 12–3; O	East Sekiwake #1; 8–7	East Sekiwake #2; 13–2; O	East Ōzeki #1; 11–4
1973	West Ōzeki #1; 11–4	East Ōzeki #1; 13–2	East Ōzeki #1; 15–0	East Yokozuna #1; 11–4	East Yokozuna #2; 15–0	East Yokozuna #1; 12–2–1
1974	East Yokozuna #1; 12–3	East Yokozuna #1; 12–3	East Yokozuna #1; 10–5	East Yokozuna #1; 13–2–P	East Yokozuna #1; 14–1	East Yokozuna #1; 9–6
1975	West Yokozuna-Ōzeki #1; 10–5	West Yokozuna #1; 0–4–11	West Yokozuna #1; 0–3–12	West Yokozuna #1; Sat out due to injury 0–0–15	West Yokozuna #1; 10–5	West Yokozuna #1; 11–4
1976	West Yokozuna #1; 12–3	West Yokozuna #1; 13–2–P	East Yokozuna #1; 13–2–P	East Yokozuna #1; 14–1	East Yokozuna #1; 12–3	East Yokozuna #1; 13–2
1977	West Yokozuna #1; 13–2	East Yokozuna #1; 12–3	West Yokozuna #1; 11–4	West Yokozuna #1; 15–0	East Yokozuna #1; 10–5	West Yokozuna #1; 14–1
1978	East Yokozuna #1; 10–5	West Yokozuna #1; 1–1–13	West Yokozuna #1; 9–6	East Yokozuna #2; 14–1	West Yokozuna #1; 1–3–11	East Yokozuna #2; 13–2
1979	West Yokozuna #1; 10–5	East Yokozuna #2; 12–3	East Yokozuna #2; 12–3	East Yokozuna #2; 14–1–P	East Yokozuna #1; 10–5	West Yokozuna #2; 10–5
1980	West Yokozuna #2; 0–3–12	West Yokozuna #2; 11–4	East Yokozuna #2; 11–4	East Yokozuna #2; 1–4–10	West Yokozuna #2; 11–4	East Yokozuna #2; 14–1
1981	East Yokozuna #1; 10–5	West Yokozuna #1; Retired; 1–2	x	x	x	x
Record given as wins–losses–absences Top division champion Top division runner-up Retired Lower divisions Non-participation Sanshō key: F=Fighting spirit; O=Outstanding performance; T=Technique Also shown: ★=Kinboshi; P=Playoff(s); Divisions: Makuuchi — Jūryō — Makushita — Sandanme — Jonidan — Jonokuchi Makuuchi ranks: Yokozuna — Ōzeki — Sekiwake — Komusubi — Maegashira

=== Awards ===
- Tokyo Sports
  - Special Award (1986)

== See also ==
- Glossary of sumo terms
- List of past sumo wrestlers
- List of sumo tournament top division champions
- List of sumo tournament top division runners-up
- List of sumo tournament second division champions
- List of yokozuna

Preceded by Kotozakura Masakatsu I	54th Yokozuna; July 1973 – March 1981	Succeeded by Kitanoumi Toshimitsu
Yokozuna is not a successive rank, and more than one wrestler can hold the title at once
