= Jinku =

Japanese traditional folk song

Jinku 甚句
- Stylistic origins: Traditional folk music
- Cultural origins: Edo period, Japan
- Typical instruments: Vocals; Shamisen; Shakuhachi; Taiko; Suzu (bell)

Subgenres
- Tsugarujinku, Sumojinku, Makouta, Kisarazujinku

Other topics
- Traditional Japanese music; Dodoitsu

Jinku (Japanese: 甚句, Hepburn: jinku; [dʑŋku], lit. "excessive verse" or "lively song") is a form of traditional and folkloric Japanese songs.

== Overview ==
The actual form of jinku songs probably appeared in the Edo period. Jinku is a vocal performance using verses. These songs often depicts qualities of character, love stories, worklife, or comedic situations.

Like the dodoitsu genre, jinku uses lyrics constituted by one chorus of 7, 7, 7, 5. Each song can be divided in 6 parts.:

- Utamakura (まくら唄), an often repeated descriptive epithet
- Honuta (本唄), the main body of the song
- Hayashi (はやし), the accompaniment of meaningless words in the song for rhythm
- Honuta (本唄), the resumption of the main body of the song
- Maeuta (前唄), the prelude to the song's end
- Atouta (後唄), the encore

== Tsugarujinku ==
Tsugarujinku (Japanese: 津軽甚句, Hepburn: tsugarujinku; [tsɡrudʑŋku]) is a folkloric song often performed with a variety of instruments, such as shamisen, Japanese flute (Shakuhachi) or Japanese drums (Taiko). It birthed in the Aomori prefecture, either in Tsugaru or Hirosaki, and is commonly used to accompany a traditional dance bearing the same name. The genre is also called "Dodarebachi" from the first words of most songs.

== Sumo jinku ==
Japan Sumo Jinkukai 日本相撲甚句会
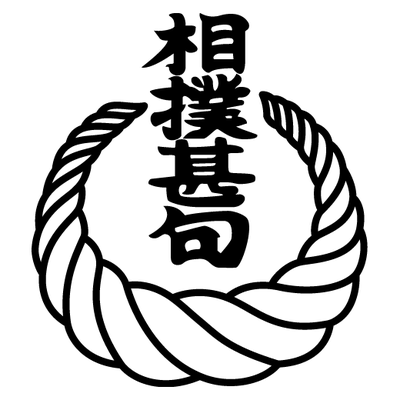
- Formation: 1995
- Purpose: promote and teach traditional sumojinku songs
- Location: Sumida, Tokyo (headquarter), also regularly hosted at the Ryōgoku Kokugikan; Daikan Plaza 301, 2-21-5 Ryogoku, Sumida-ku, Tokyo
- Region served: Japan
- Members: 400 members
- Official language: Japanese
- Chairman: Iida Michiyo
- Parent organization: Agency for Cultural Affairs
- Website: https://sumoujinku.com/index.html

Sumojinku (Japanese: 相撲甚句, Hepburn: sumojinku; [sɯmoːdʑŋku]) is one of the most popular and known form of jinku. It is performed a capella by yobidashi or sumo wrestlers during sumo celebrations, such as danpatsu-shiki or regional tours.
The yobidashi are traditionally given the task of composing jinku even though it is now quite common to have wrestlers composing it. It is often distributed in three sub genres: meisho jinku (名所甚句), glorifying songs; o iwai jinku (お祝甚句), festive songs; and owarai jinku (お笑い甚句), comedic songs.

Sumojinku follows a precise sequence in which the singer occupy the center of the dohyo and sing with an open fan while wrestlers circles him and punctuate the song with hands gestures and exclamations like "hoi" and "dosukoi" while moving around the singer. Every rikishi, no matter his rank, can participate to a jinku song, even those in the lower ranks. They're all given a keshō-mawashi, either borrowed from a senior wrestler or their own, for the occasion. However, only sekitori gets to wear their ōichōmage.

Some wrestlers are well known for their ability to sing traditional jinku such as Ikioi, Daishi or Konishiki.

=== Japan Sumo Jinku Association ===
The Japan Sumo Jinkukai or Japan Sumo Jinku Association (Japanese: 日本相撲甚句会, Hepburn: Japan Sumo Jinkukai) is a body that gave itself the mission promote, teach and develop jinku songs, and more specifically sumo jinku songs, as an art and culture in Japan under the jurisdiction of the Agency for Cultural Affairs. The organization has its headquarter in Ryōgoku, Sumida Tokyo.

==== History ====
The association was founded in 1995 by former Nishonoseki yobidashi Nagao (real name: Fukuda Nagamasa, 1930–2012) who notably composed the jinku for the retirement ceremony of yokozuna Wakanohana in 1963, or the "Sumo Training Song" (相撲協会錬成歌) in 1979. In 2012, his daughter, Iida Michiyo, became the chairman of the association.

==== Missions ====
The association tends to develop a strong territorial network by founding and approving local branches divided in 6 regional zones:

- Northern region (Kitahiroshima, Aomori, Tsugaru, Yamagata, Kurihara, Sōma)
- Eastern region (Mito, Kashima, Takasaki, Saitama, Edogawa, Tokyo, Katsushika, Tokyo, Nakano, Tokyo, Ōta, Tokyo, Sumida, Tokyo, Oedo, Kanagawa, Chiba)
- Hokushinetsu region (Saku, Jōetsu, Kanazawa, Tsuruga)
- Tokai region (Shizuoka, Gotemba, Toyohashi)
- Western region (Osaka, Naniwa, Kobe, Tanba, Tokushima, Hōfu)
- Kyushu region (Higashi-ku, Fukuoka, Hakata, Fukuoka, Saga Prefecture, Kumamoto, Kagoshima)

The association also maintain the teaching of the tradition in the country by appointing teachers ranked as instructor (師範), district master (地区総師範) or national general instructor (全国総師範) and by organizing nationwide tournaments.

== Makouta ==
Makouta (Japanese: 馬子唄, Hepburn: makouta) is a worksong originating from the Iwate Province. It is originally the song of bakuro horse trainers. It was sung as the bakuro rode at night, to overcome boredom and loneliness, to let people know where the horse rider was and also to prevent rabbits and foxes from jumping out of the grass along the road to startle the horses.

== Kisarazujinku ==
Kisarazujinku (Japanese: 木更津甚句, Hepburn: kisarazujinku) is a genre of jinku song originating from Kisarazu. It was sung by fishermen at sea or during seine fishing
