= Gyōji =

Referee in professional sumo wrestling

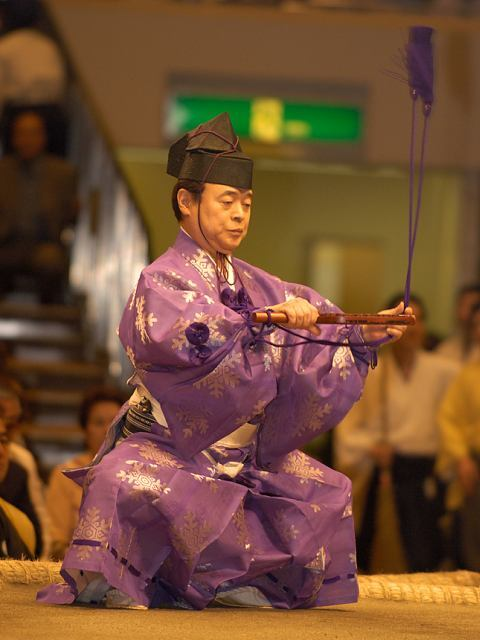
A sumo gyōji, the 33rd Kimura Shōnosuke, in full traditional dress

A gyōji (行司; Japanese pronunciation: [ɡʲoːʑi], lit. 'administering things') is a referee employed by the Japan Sumo Association, responsible for a variety of activities which concern the organisation of the sport in general and the refereeing of matches, as well as the preservation of professional sumo culture, deeply rooted in Shinto traditions. Subject to the same strict hierarchy and traditional appearance as the other professions gravitating around professional sumo, the gyōji are one of the most visible professions at tournaments (honbasho), being the third person in the dohyō (wrestling ring) and sometimes defined as "an essential part of the sumo spectacle".

Inherited from a tradition of refereeing dating back to the Heian period, gyōji did not take on their current role until the Tenshō era in the late 16th century. Since the end of the 18th century, gyōji have been entrusted with religious functions, which they perform during the consecration of combat areas, before tournaments or in the stables to which they belong. The gyōji's responsibilities also include drafting the banzuke, the document defining the promotion or demotion of wrestlers, and supervise match selections made by the toshiyori (elders) on each tournament day.

== History ==
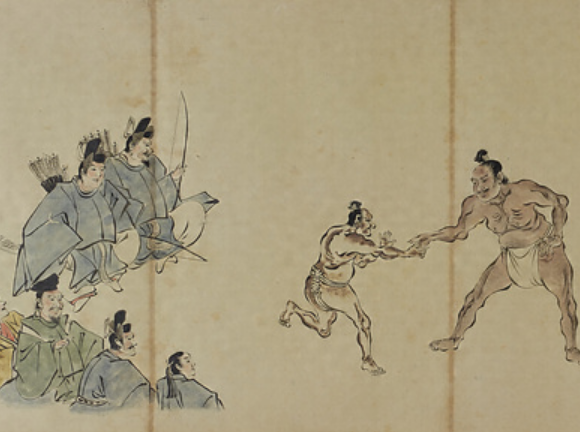
Buke-sumo, or combat training sumo, practiced by samurai. On the left the tachiawase and kazusashi.

The role of referee in sumo began long before the gyōji was entrusted with it. During the Heian period, the role of match referee was not yet defined, and besides the wrestlers, there were a number of officials responsible for supervising matches. These roles were given to imperial guards bearing the title of tachiawase (立合), a rank bearing the same kanji as the spelling of tachi-ai. These officials, dressed as archers and carrying bows and quivers, were accompanied by substitutes, the kazusashi (数刺し), who were dressed in the same way and were responsible for keeping the scorebook. An official, Shiga-no-Seirin (sometimes spelled Shigano Seirin or called Shiga Seirin), was appointed by Emperor Shōmu and founded one of the first hereditary lines of referees, and is also credited with establishing the original forty-eight sumo techniques. During the same period, the term "gyōji" also appeared, but the role of the staff bearing this title, all sixth-tier courtiers, was confined to administrative organization and various tasks linked to the court ceremony alongside the sumo tournaments. At the start of the Kamakura shogunate, gyōji still did not referee matches, this role falling to sumo bugyō (相撲奉行), or 'sumo magistrates'. During the Muromachi period, the term began to be applied to samurai-ranked referees, involved in the temporary judging of matches between wrestlers.

In 1570 (Genki era), however, Oda Nobunaga appointed two warriors from his retinue to the role of gyōji and gave them the task of organizing the shogunate's sumo tournaments. During the Tokugawa shogunate, sumo became popular but the shogun, in an effort to moralize society, banned traditional tournaments organized as part of festivals. As the sport began to be sponsored by the local lords, and in order to eliminate conflicts that would lead to the shogunate's ban on sumo, referee families taught sumo etiquette, rules and techniques to professional wrestlers (rikishi) in various domains. With the incorporation of Shinto elements into sumo traditions during the Tokugawa shogunate, the role of gyōji took on even greater importance, emerging as surrogate priests. As a result, requiring licenses to exercise the role of referee became extremely valuable, and by the early 18th century two families stood out in the legal control of gyōji: the House of Yoshida Tsukasa and the House of Gojō, both originating from the long tradition of local lords appointing their own officials to train wrestlers sponsored by their domain.

Before the national standardization of sumo organizations, the sporting landscape was divided between several associations scattered around the country, the largest developing in Edo, Kyoto and Osaka. At the end of the 18th century, around 1780, the Edo-based sumo association began a long period of domination of the national sumo scene. Yoshida Tsukasa, the clan controlling the observance of etiquette in Edo, took advantage of this gain in popularity to consolidate its authority over the other hereditary lines of referees, leading to the sole recognition of the referee traditions inherited from this family, which continues to the present. During the mid-Edo period, the role of gyōji asserted itself and began to take on its current form, with the use of the gunbai (war fan) and the wearing of the ceremonial kimono.

== Career and ranking ==
=== Ring names ===
Like wrestlers and most other professions involved in professional sumo, gyōji do not work under their real name, but under a pseudonym similar to the shikona, or ring name, used by wrestlers. In modern times, all gyōji will take either the family name Kimura (木村) or Shikimori (式守) as their professional name, depending on the tradition recruits are joining. Within these two families, the names of the two highest-ranking members never change and the two top gyōji are always called Shikimori Inosuke (式守 伊之助), the junior tate-gyōji, and Kimura Shōnosuke (木村 庄之助), his senior.

With the rise in importance and popularity of sumo during the Edo period, many hereditary lines of referees became codified, and some sought the patronage of the House of Yoshida Tsukasa. Around 1770, several lineages existed simultaneously and officiated throughout Japan under the influence of the Yoshida, such as the Iwai Sauma in Kyoto, Shakushi Ichigaku in Osaka, Hattori Shikiemon in Higo and Suminoe Shikikuro in Nagasaki. Between 1726 and 1729, the referees named Kimura Shōnosuke and Shikimori Godaiyū (式守 五大夫) sought patronage from the Yoshida and began working as referees in the Edo-based association. According to a genealogy tree produced by the 6th Shōnosuke during the Meiwa era, the name Kimura Shōnosuke was originally adopted during the Kan'ei era by Nakadachi Uzaemon, a vassal of the Sanada clan, who was the third-generation head of a hereditary line of referees. The Shikimori, however, descend from a different lineage, founded by a former wrestler who became an elder under the name Isenoumi Godaiyū. He later changed his name to Shikimori Godaiyū and launched his own line of referees. Between 1765 and 1774, one of his descendants, named Shikimori Inosuke, established himself as a prominent figure and was appointed as one of the highest referee, second only to Kimura Shōnosuke; thus de facto taking the lead in his line.

Today, the lineage of referees is mostly extinct, with the exception of the Kimura and Shikimori families which are the names of the two most powerful lines of referees to have made their mark since the middle of the 18th century. Today's gyōji must choose to belong to one of these two lines.

Gyōji surnames may be influenced by stable traditions. The two families are not equal; their heads, for example, do not have quite the same rank, a Kimura still being considered a senior compared to a Shikimori. The Kimura family is also much larger, with almost twice as many members as the Shikimori. At one time, there was still a blood tie between the members of these families, but nowadays the relationship between families is primarily hierarchical, with gyōji switching between families as they are promoted through the ranks, particularly when they reach the top of the hierarchy. Thus, the referee named Shikimori Inosuke, head of the Shikimori, will take the name Kimura Shōnosuke, and will therefore change family, if the latter retires. Other examples of promotion in the other family included notably that of the 38th Kimura Shōnosuke who changed from the Kimura family to the Shikimori family when he gave up his name of Kimura Waichirō (木村 和一郎) to become the eleventh Shikimori Kandayū (式守 勘太夫) upon his promotion to the ranks of san'yaku in 2012. The 43rd Shikimori Inosuke had been with the Kimura family from his gyōji debut in September 1979 until his tate-gyōji promotion in January 2025.

As gyōji rise through the ranks and begin officiating higher divisions, they can change their first name to that of a past gyōji, thus taking on a more prestigious name, often part of a long tradition. For example, the name Shikimori Kandayū has been passed down for more than two hundred years. Other traditions may, on the contrary, encourage the referee to keep his name or to be given a unique one linked to his stable.

Each lineage of referee has its own traditions, one of the most visible being the handling of the gunbai when the latter is pointed in one direction to determine a winner: Kimura referees keep the back of their fist upward, while Shikimori referees have their palm facing upward.

=== System of promotion ===
The maximum number of gyōji allowed in the Sumo Association is 45. As of January 2024, there are 43 gyōji within the Sumo Association. Like the yobidashi, the gyōji are employed directly by the Japan Sumo Association but are affiliated with the stables like wrestlers. New recruits do not have to meet height or weight requirements and it is even implied that a small gyōji is preferable, for aesthetic reasons, as it creates a greater contrast with the taller and bigger wrestlers. Many gyōji are former wrestlers who could not rise in the professional world and decided to change their path. Prior to 1972, the gyōji began their training at the age of six or seven, before becoming referees in real-life situations between the ages of thirteen and fourteen, while at the same time receiving a normal education. Recruits now begin their career around the age of fifteen or sixteen, after graduating from junior high school. Gyōji then work up a career ladder based on the professional sumo divisions until their retirement at 65. The current ranking system consists of the following eight ranks, listed in descending order:

- tate-gyōji (立行司)
- san'yaku-gyōji (三役行司)
- makuuchi-gyōji (幕内行司)
- jūryō-gyōji (十両行司)
- makushita-gyōji (幕下行司)
- sandanme-gyōji (三段目行司)
- jonidan-gyōji (序二段行司)
- jonokuchi-gyōji (序ノ口行司)

Promotions are decided once a year at the banzuke (rankings) organization meeting held after the September tournament and are only applicable starting the following January. Promotions were mainly based on seniority, but from 1972 onwards, greater consideration was given to the personal qualities of referees, such as their ability to judge, the tone and power of their voice and also their work ethic. Other qualities are also taken into account, such as calligraphic skills, speed and agility in the ring and leadership shown when facing a difficult decision. On the other hand, too many invalidated refereeing decisions can hinder promotion. This penalty, however, is the highest consequence a gyōji can suffer, as gyōji cannot be demoted. The maximum number of sekitori-ranked gyōji (jūryō and above) is between 20 and 22. Until 1960, there was no mandatory retirement age and top-ranked gyōji usually served until death, illness or senility. The promotion chain was hence blocked to the point where a persistent rumour had it that junior gyōji rejoiced at the death of their elders as much as they lamented it. Today's promotions are slow but almost certain and some gyōji may be as popular as some wrestlers.

Junior gyōji evolve under the tutelage of their seniors. Unlike wrestlers, gyōji have no training school for their initial training, and learn everything from the master under whom they are placed. It usually takes a gyōji 15 years to be promoted to the jūryō ranks. It takes another 15 years to be promoted to officiating makuuchi matches. The tate-gyōji (top two gyōji) usually have anywhere from 40 to 50 years of experience. There are exceptions, notably the 27th Kimura Shōnosuke who was promoted to Shikimori Inosuke at the age of 48 in 1973, making him the youngest tate-gyōji in the history of the sport. As referees are promoted, the number of matches they can officiate is reduced. Young gyōji can referee up to ten matches in a day, while their seniors can referee two at most. At the top of the hierarchy, both tate-gyōji usually referee a single match. However, this rule may be called into question in the event of a playoff on the last day of the tournament. In this case, the tate-gyōji who officiated the last match before the playoff gives way to the referee sitting at the foot of the ring, even if the latter had already judged the penultimate match of the day. The two tate-gyōji organize themselves so that they do not have to officiate several tournament playoffs in a row.

Compared to other professions outside professional sumo, or compared to wrestlers' salaries, gyōji pay is low but still higher than that of yobidashi. Top-ranked gyōji earn between 400,000 and 500,000 yen ($3320, or €2487 as of November 2023). The basic salary for a makushita-ranked gyōji is between 42,000 yen ($281, or €258) to 100,000 yen ($669, or €615). Like wrestlers, however, gyōji receive bonuses after each tournament.

Prior to July 1993, the gyōji were the only profession of sumo unrelated to wrestler (retired or active) to be featured in the banzuke, the traditional rankings of sumo. Since then, the upper-ranked yobidashi also have their names automatically included on the banzuke. The names of the gyōji are listed in the center vertical column above the names of the judges and below the gomenkōmuru (蒙御免) and the tournament dates and site.

Gyōji, like wrestlers, are deprived of certain freedoms unless they reach a certain rank, and are required, for example, to live in their own stable. However, unlike wrestlers, who have the option of living elsewhere once they reach the rank of jūryō, gyōji can move once they reach the rank of makushita. Gyōji who have achieved sekitori status are assigned tsukebito (personal attendants) just as top wrestlers are. These may be junior referees or lower-ranked wrestlers, the latter being considered unlucky because there is a superstition in the sumo world that a wrestler serving a gyōji will not go on to have a successful career. The tate-gyōji may have a maximum of two assistants, when the referees ranked below him have only one. Gyōji ranked near the top of the hierarchy can use an akeni (明荷), a bamboo and washi luggage box dating back to the Edo period, to transport their personal belongings. Tate-gyōji also have their names displayed on nobori (tall banner) at the entrance to the arenas where tournaments are held. In the past, retired gyōji who had managed to secure an elder-share (a pseudonym under which a person may become an executive of the Japan Sumo Association) could remain in the Japan Sumo Association as elders, but the practice is no longer permitted.

High-ranking gyōji as of November 2026
Rank	Name	Stable	Real name	Date of birth	Promotion	Refs
Tate-gyōji	The 40th Kimura Shōnosuke	Kasugano	Yoshimitsu Morita	12 September 1963 (age 63)	November 2026 (Note: After the retirement of the 39th Kimura Shōnosuke, promotions for the two tate-gyōji spots took effect in November rather than in January.)	
Tate-gyōji	The 44th Shikimori Inosuke	Kokonoe	Toshiaki Kojima	21 April 1965 (age 61)	November 2026	
San'yaku-gyōji	Kimura Hisanosuke	Ōshima	Toshikazu Hata	27 June 1967 (age 59)	January 2024	
San'yaku-gyōji	The 12th Shikimori Kandayū	Asahiyama	Hiroshi Kikuchi	15 November 1968 (age 57)	January 2025	

=== Traditional dress ===
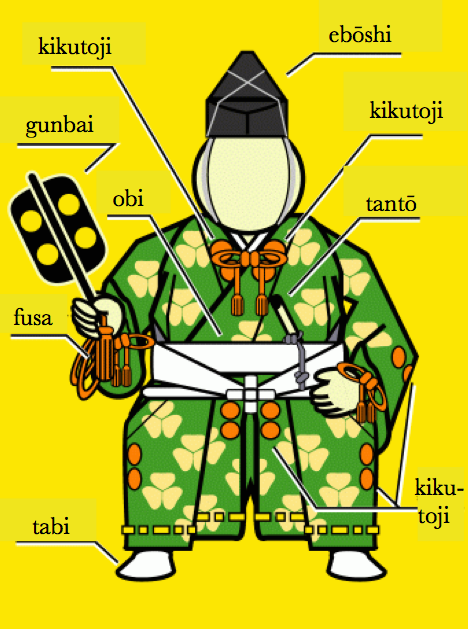
An annotated diagram showing the different parts of a gyōji's costume.

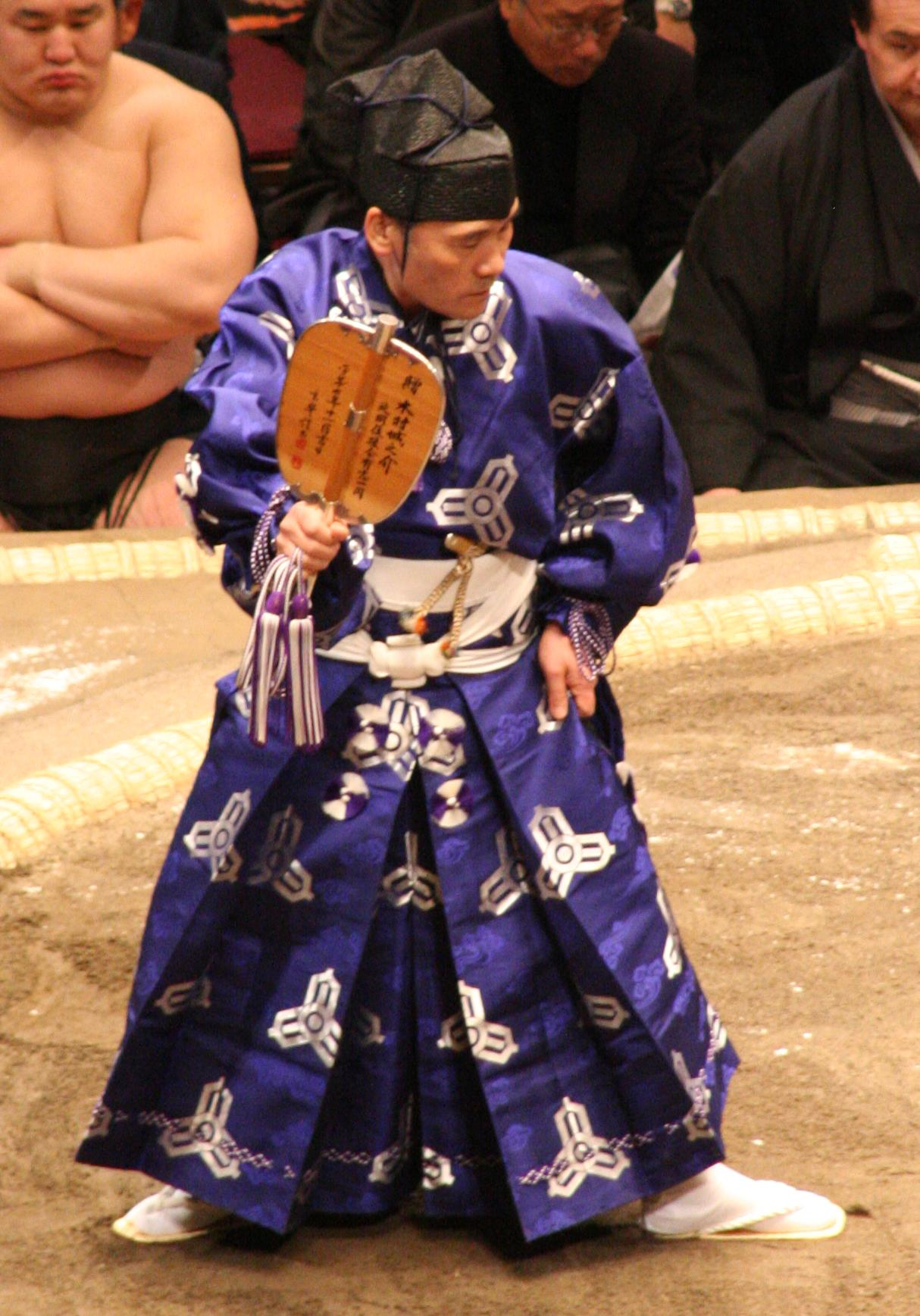
The 37th Shikimori Inosuke with his distinctive top rank white-and-purple tassels and tantō on his belt.

In the ring, gyōji wear elaborate ceremonial costumes, either called the shōzoku or the hitatare, making them a "flamboyant part of the sumo scene". The kimono worn by the gyōji is usually a gift from patrons. It imitates either the one worn by samurai-ranked officials during hunting parties organized during the Muromachi period, or court dress worn during the Heian period.

The costume has undergone a series of changes to arrive at its current form. During the Edo period, gyōji wore a linen kamishimo, a sleeveless kimono with exaggerated shoulders, called asagamishimo (麻裃). In May 1910, the Tokyo-sumo association made the decision to change the costume of professional referees to the one currently in use. However, the tradition of wearing the costumes used during the Edo period is still preserved in traditional regional tournaments, particularly on the Oki Islands. With the Dampatsurei Edict of 1871, referees could no longer keep their chonmage, and one of the reasons for adopting the new costume would have been to make it easier to conceal the referee's hair to hide his lack of topknot with a hat. This hat, worn in addition to the richly decorated kimonos, is called an eboshi (烏帽子). It is a lacquered black hat inspired by the hats worn by courtiers in feudal Japan and fashioned after the hats worn by Shinto priests. To add color to this headdress, some gyōji replace the eboshi's dark cords with colored ones. Each costume worn by gyōji ranked in jūryō or above is as expensive as a keshō-mawashi worn by wrestlers of equivalent rank during their ring entering ceremonies. Each gyōji chooses the color and pattern of his kimono, but only tate-gyōji may use purple, the symbol of their rank. In winter, gyōji tend to wear darker colors than those worn during the summer months.

Like yobidashi, who may receive tatsuke-bakama from high-ranking wrestlers upon promotion, tate-gyōji may also be given kimonos by yokozuna, often with the wrestlers' names embroidered on them. For the sake of impartiality, tate-gyōji only wear these costumes for yokozuna ring-entering ceremonies and not during their matches, in order to avoid any suspicion of bias. Although gyōji kimono are often embroidered with very traditional motifs such as kamon, in October 2021, the Japan Sumo Association formed a partnership with The Pokémon Company to celebrate the 25th anniversary of Pokémon Red and Blue and since the January 2022 tournament, gyōji can be seen wearing Poké Ball-themed kimono.

The outfits used all incorporate a number of rosettes, called kikutoji, and tassels, called fusa. These ornaments change color to indicate the gyōji's rank. Unlike yobidashi, whose uniform is identical regardless of rank, each gyōji's costume reflects the rank he holds and has specific features depending on the rank reached. On promotion, the gyōji will change into more elaborate outfits and small changes in dress continue as the referee moves up the hierarchy. Since 1960, gyōji who have attained the rank of jūryō wear several pairs of tabi per tournament. These socks, originally designed only for walking on tatami mats and not on the hard and sandy surface of a dohyō, wear out very quickly after a day of matches. Gyōji who are promoted to the rank of san'yaku may wear an inro on the rear-right side of their belt. Both the top two gyōji carry a tantō (a dagger) visible in the left side of the belt of the outfit. This is supposed to represent the seriousness of the decisions they must make in determining the outcome of a bout, and a symbolic preparedness to commit seppuku if they make a mistake. Another rumor has it that the referee carries this dagger to defend his verdict against any wrestler or spectator who comes to threaten him or question his decision. This was notably the case during an Osaka-based sumo association match during the Edo period, when a local tate-gyōji by the name of Iwai Dannosuke (岩井 団之助) had to defend himself against an aggressive elder who was unhappy that his wrestler had been declared the loser.

As their careers progress, gyōji incorporate elements such as the following into their outfits:

Rank		Costume and fabric	Kikutoji and fusa	Footwear	Ceremonial object
Tate-gyōji	Kimura Shōnosuke	Thick silk (winter); Thin linen (summer)	Purple	Tabi socks and zōri sandals	Tantō dagger and inro
Tate-gyōji	Shikimori Inosuke	Thick silk (winter); Thin linen (summer)	Purple and white	Tabi socks and zōri sandals	Tantō dagger and inro
San'yaku-gyōji		Thick silk (winter); Thin linen (summer)	Vermilion	Tabi socks and zōri sandals	Inro
Makuuchi-gyōji		Thick silk (winter); Thin linen (summer)	Red and white	Tabi socks	None
Jūryō-gyōji		Thick silk (winter); Thin linen (summer)	Green and white	Tabi socks	None
Makushita-gyōji		Cotton	Green Black	Bare feet with the kimono tied above the knees	None
Sandanme-gyōji		Cotton	Green Black	Bare feet with the kimono tied above the knees	None
Jonidan-gyōji		Cotton	Green Black	Bare feet with the kimono tied above the knees	None
Jonokuchi-gyōji		Cotton	Green Black	Bare feet with the kimono tied above the knees	None

To accompany their costumes, each gyōji carries a gunbai, a wooden war fan similar to the Japanese command staff used by generals at the head of their troops. There are no rules about the materials to be used or the shape a gunbai should take. The first gunbai owned by a young gyōji is given to him either by a senior gyōji or the stablemaster of the stable to which he belongs. Each gyōji has his own and those handled by top-ranked gyōji, lacquered with gold or silver ornamentation. Some gunbai are handed down from generation to generation, sometimes to be used only by the gyōji who holds a particular ring name. This is notably the case for Kimura Shōnosuke's gunbai, which has been passed down to successors for over 160 years. Shikimori Kandayū's gunbai is also a legacy handed down since Kandayū II in 1866.

== Responsibilities ==
=== Refereeing a match ===
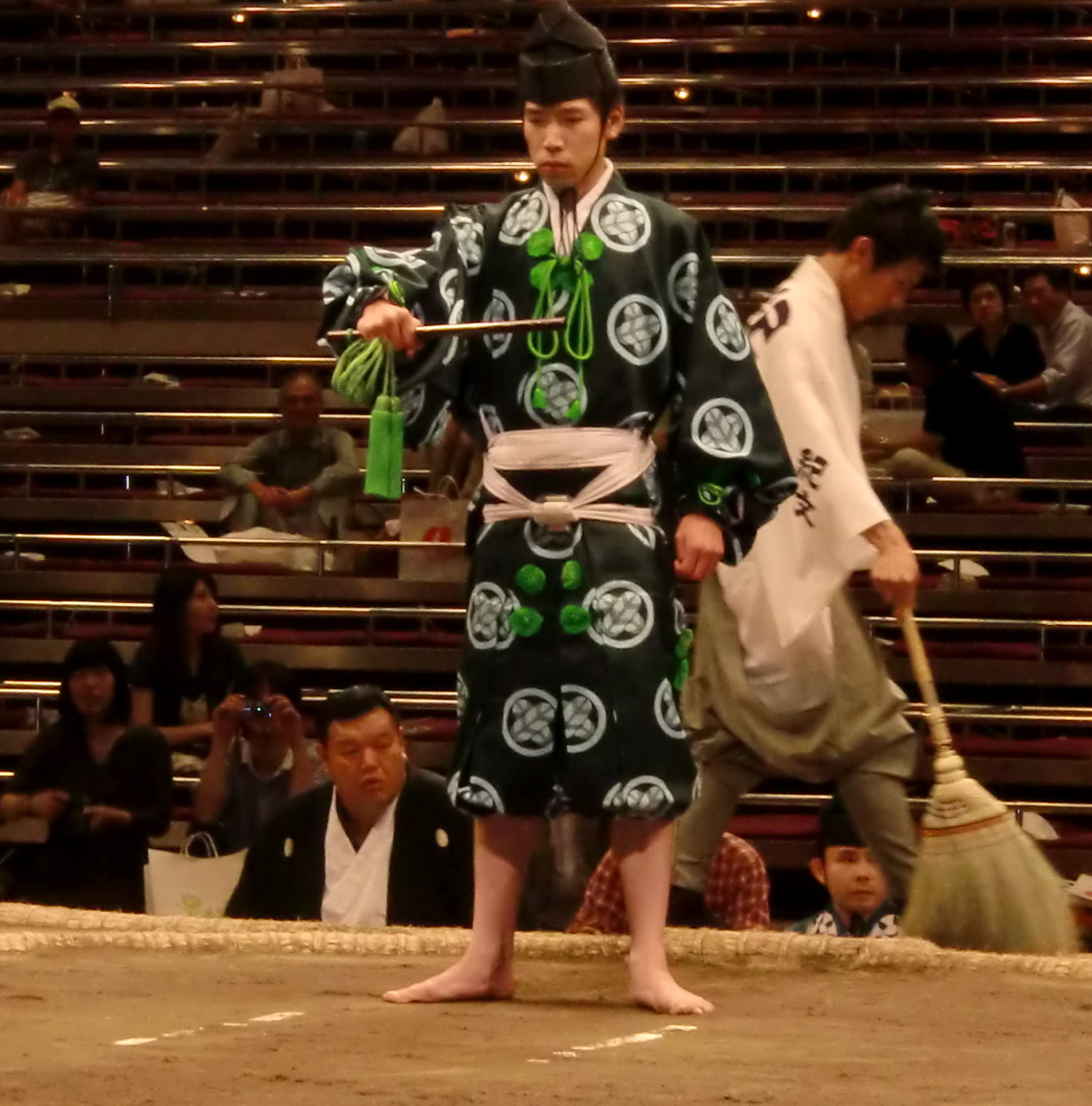
The gyōji supervises the shikiri preparations in his initial neutral position.

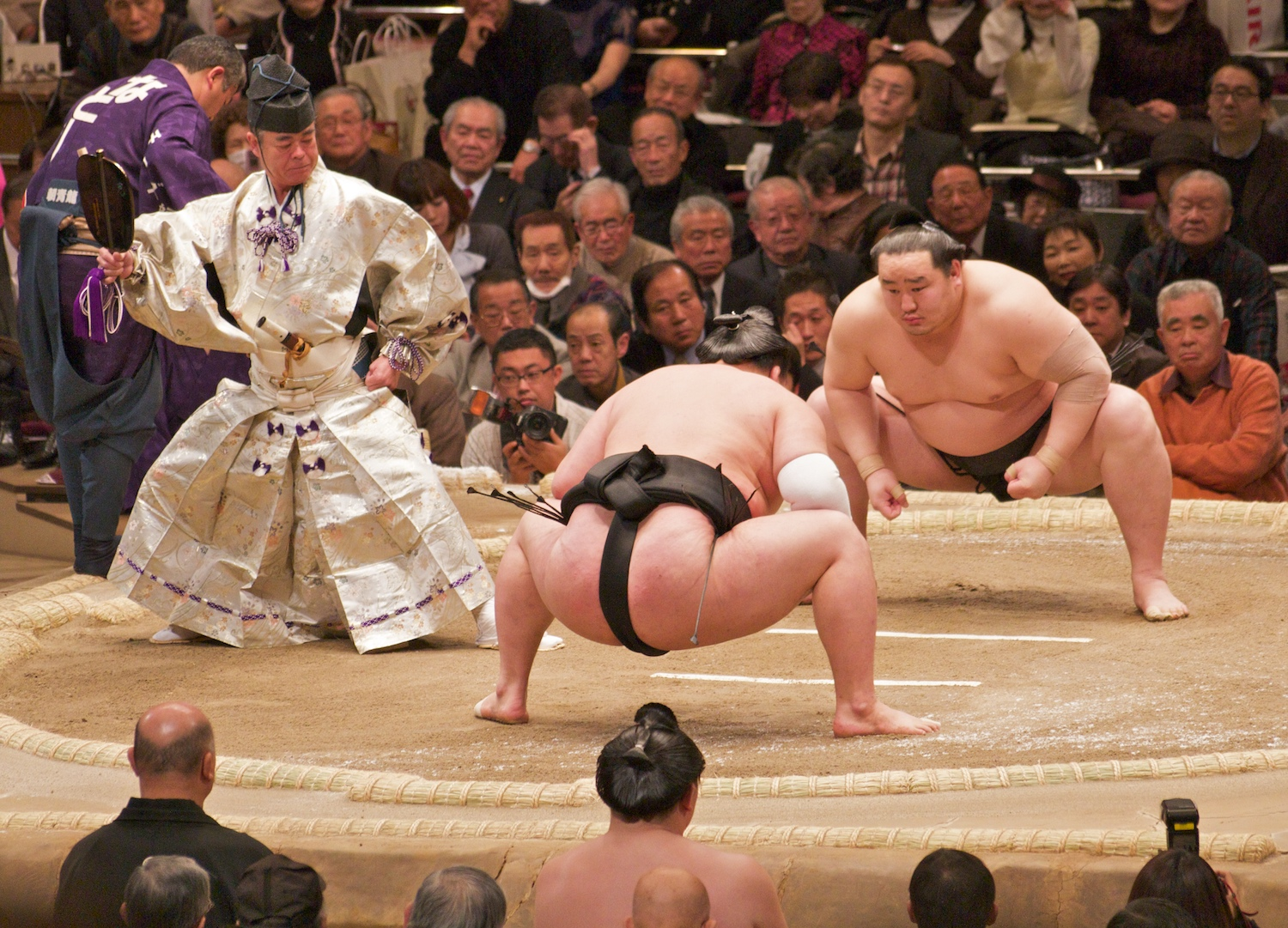
The gyōji is in a side position, indicating to the wrestlers that this is their last preparation before time runs out.

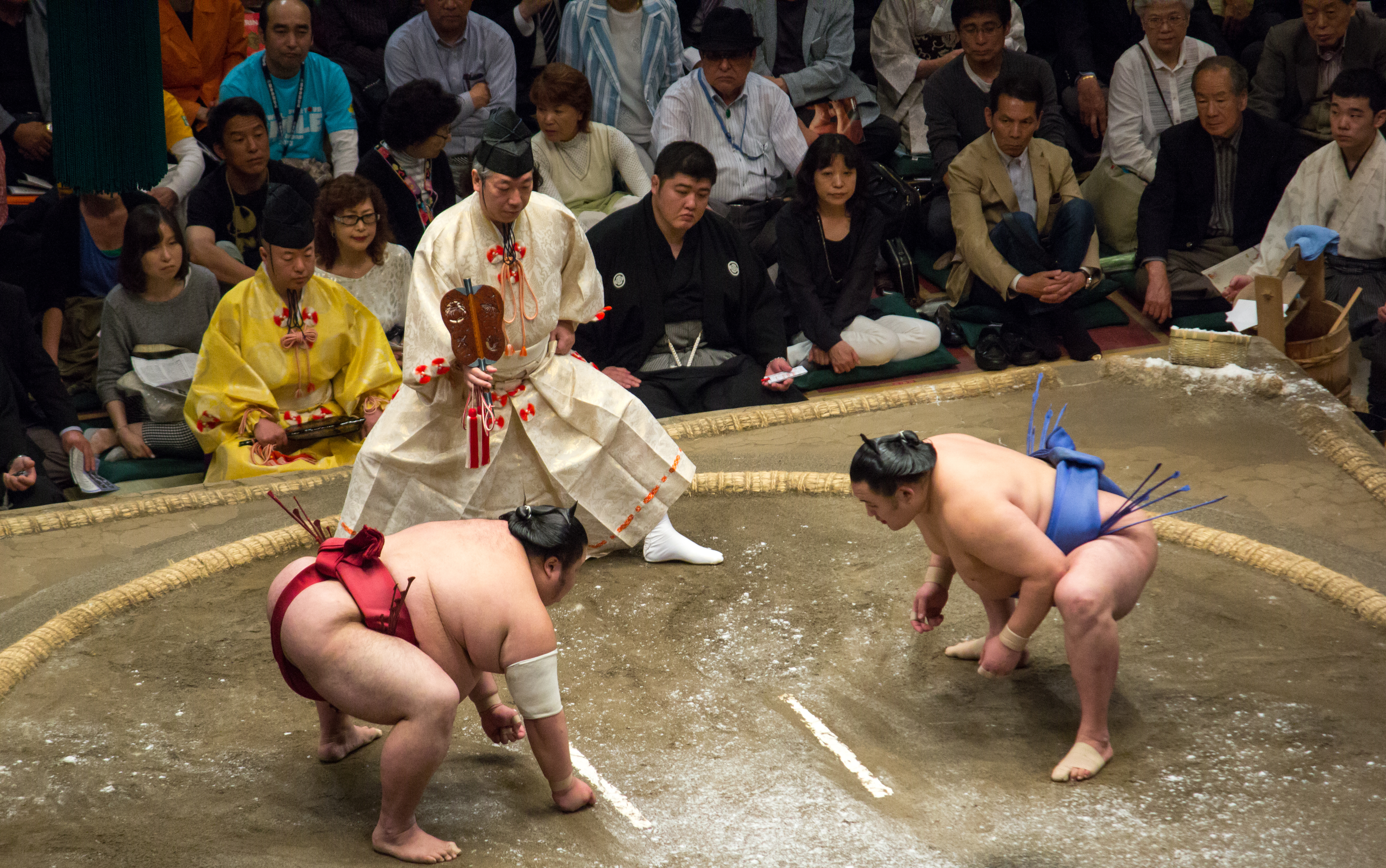
The gyōji with his gunbai flat against him, facing the center of the ring, announcing the imminent start of the fight.

The gyōji's principal and most obvious task is to referee bouts between two sumo wrestlers. The gyōji is regarded as an unquestionable authority figure in the ring, and is never booed or hissed at. The gyōji's verdicts can, however, be overturned by the judges seated around the ring (the shimpan). During the Meiji era, Japan underwent a series of changes which also had an impact on the traditional way in which sumo tournaments were held and on the organisation of the sumo association. During the same period, Takasago Uragorō launched a protest movement forcing the association to adopt measures aimed at improving their image, in particular by ending the possession of the final judgement of a match, which was changed from gyōji to shimpan.

Each gyōji referees matches taking place in the division that corresponds to the referee's rank. Only the tate-gyōji are allowed to referee a match involving a yokozuna. In all the matches they referee, gyōji are expected to give a decision on the spot, whatever the conditions at the end of a match. Too many overturned decisions lead to stagnation in the promotion order or a salary cut. The only exception is that torinaoshi (rematch) are not counted as refereeing errors. If a referee in the highest ranks has too many of his decisions overturned, he is expected to submit his resignation to the JSA Board of Directors. However, these resignations are regularly rejected. At makuuchi level, referees suffer a penalty if they make more than nine mistakes in a year while jūryō-ranked are permitted up to ten. As for the other ranks in the hierarchy (below jūryō), there are no financial penalties, but promotions are nevertheless affected.

In the ring, the gyōji follows a very specific protocol before the fight begins. The referee always supervises the proceedings from the north corner of the ring, facing south. After the yobidashi has called them into the ring, the gyōji will also call out each wrestler's name. On odd-numbered days, the call is made from the east to west, and on even-numbered days the call is made in the other way round. It is the gyōji's responsibility to watch over the wrestlers as they go through the initial prebout staring contests (the shikiri), during which he first stands facing the shikiri-sen, the white starting lines in the centre of the ring, then sideways with the gunbai raised and in profile. When the preparation time is up, the referee receives a signal from the judge in charge of keeping time via the yobidashi. The gyōji then places his gunbai flat against him, a gesture that signifies to the wrestlers that the fight must begin. The gyōji then coordinates the initial charge (or tachi-ai) between the wrestlers. Immediately after the wrestlers initiate a tachi-ai that the gyōji deems acceptable, he will begin to referee the match. Although it is the wrestlers who ultimately determine the exact point at which the tachi-ai is initiated, if the two wrestlers' breathing is not synchronized or if one wrestler charges before they both put their hands down, the gyōji will notify them that they should wait before going ahead until both are ready or that the charge was a false start. If a false start has been ruled, the wrestlers must return to their starting positions and try another tachi-ai.

A gyōji calling out a match between sandanme-ranked Mankajō (left) and Gōtenyū in May 2007

The shouts that gyōji use in the ring are called kakegoe, and are codified with no ad-libbing tolerated.

If the match time exceeds four minutes with little movement, the time-keeper will usually indicate to the gyōji to call for a mizu-iri, or water break. The gyōji then notifies the wrestlers to get out of the ring. He then records the exact positions of both wrestlers' hands and feet, and puts them back in this position once the break has concluded. The gyōji starts the fighting again by simultaneously hitting the backs of the wrestlers' mawashi. Although there are no strict rules on what to do when a match is paused, it was noted during the November 2023 tournament that a procedure inspired by then-makuuchi referee Kimura Hisanosuke, consisting of using salt to mark the positions of the wrestlers' feet, was reused because it was considered elegant and effective. Additionally, the gyōji may call for a short break if he needs to fix a wrestler's mawashi. The gyōji puts the gunbai cord in his mouth and swings it over his shoulder to dangle from his back. He then reties the loincloth. In the extremely rare event that a mawashi falls and exposes a wrestler's nudity, the gyōji is expected to use his gunbai as a fig leaf to cover an exposed wrestler. Sometimes, during a particularly hectic match, the referee falls out of the ring or is accidentally knocked down by the wrestlers. If, following a fall, the gyōji is no longer able to give a verdict or hand out prize envelopes, it is up to the gyōji waiting at the foot of the ring to take his place.

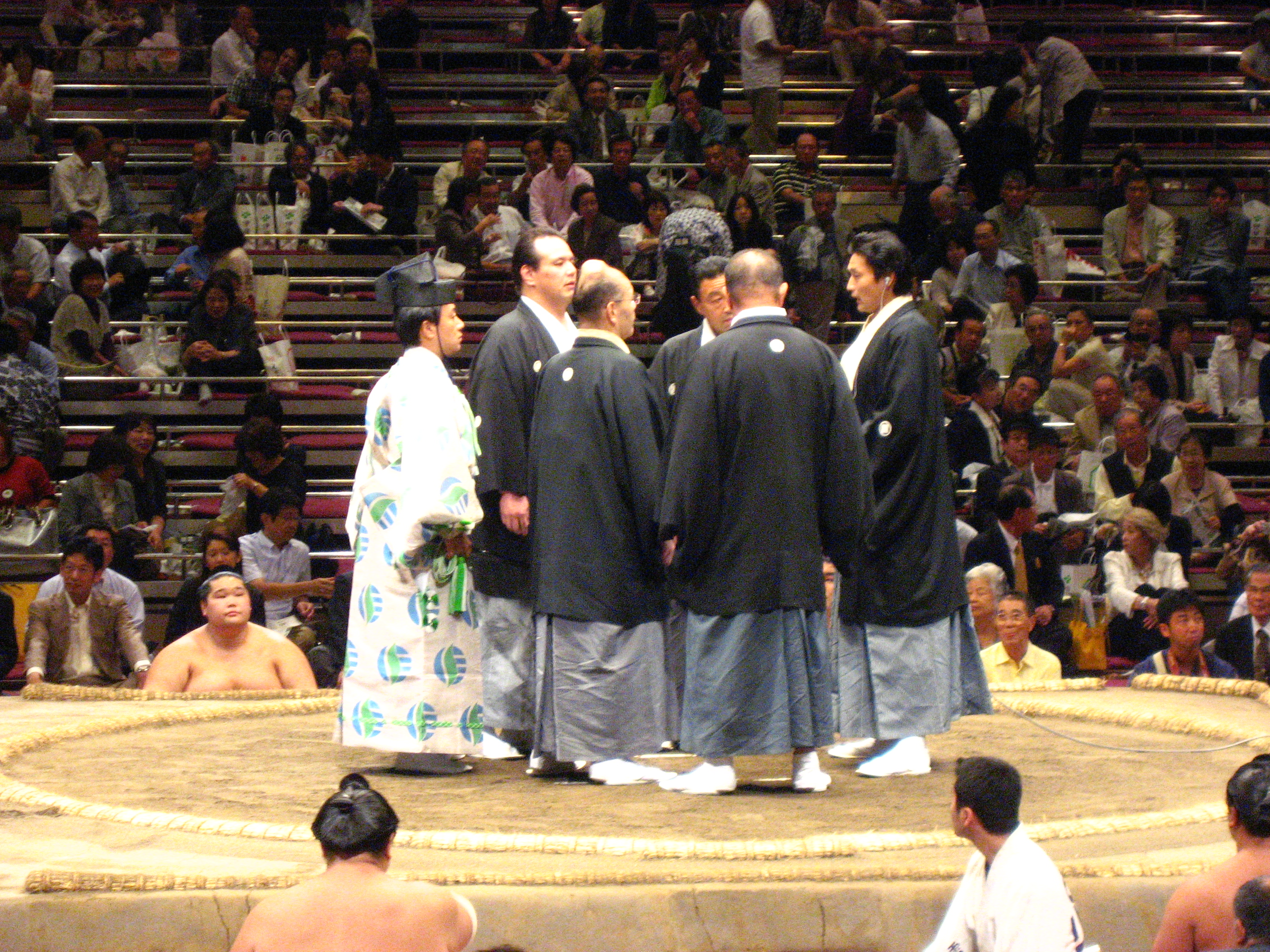
A mono-ii during a jūryō bout in 2008

When the gyōji considers that a wrestler has lost, he ends the match by pointing his gunbai to the side of the winning wrestler. The gyōji's decision as to the winner of the bout is not immediately final and can be called into question by one of the five shimpan (judges) who sit around the ring. If they dispute the result, they hold a mono-ii (lit. 'talk of things') in the center of the ring, and correspond through an earpiece to a further two judges in the video review room. They can confirm the decision of the gyōji (gunbai-dōri, 'way of the gunbai'), overturn it (sashichigae, 'wrong indication'), or order a rematch (torinaoshi). The gyōji is not expected to take part in the discussion during a mono-ii unless asked to do so. When a final verdict is reached, the gyōji again points his gunbai at the victorious wrestler and announces his shikona, or ring name, in a clear voice. If the match had received corporate sponsorship and kenshō banners had been displayed before the start of the fight, the gyōji brings over the envelopes containing the money on his gunbai.

=== Religious role ===
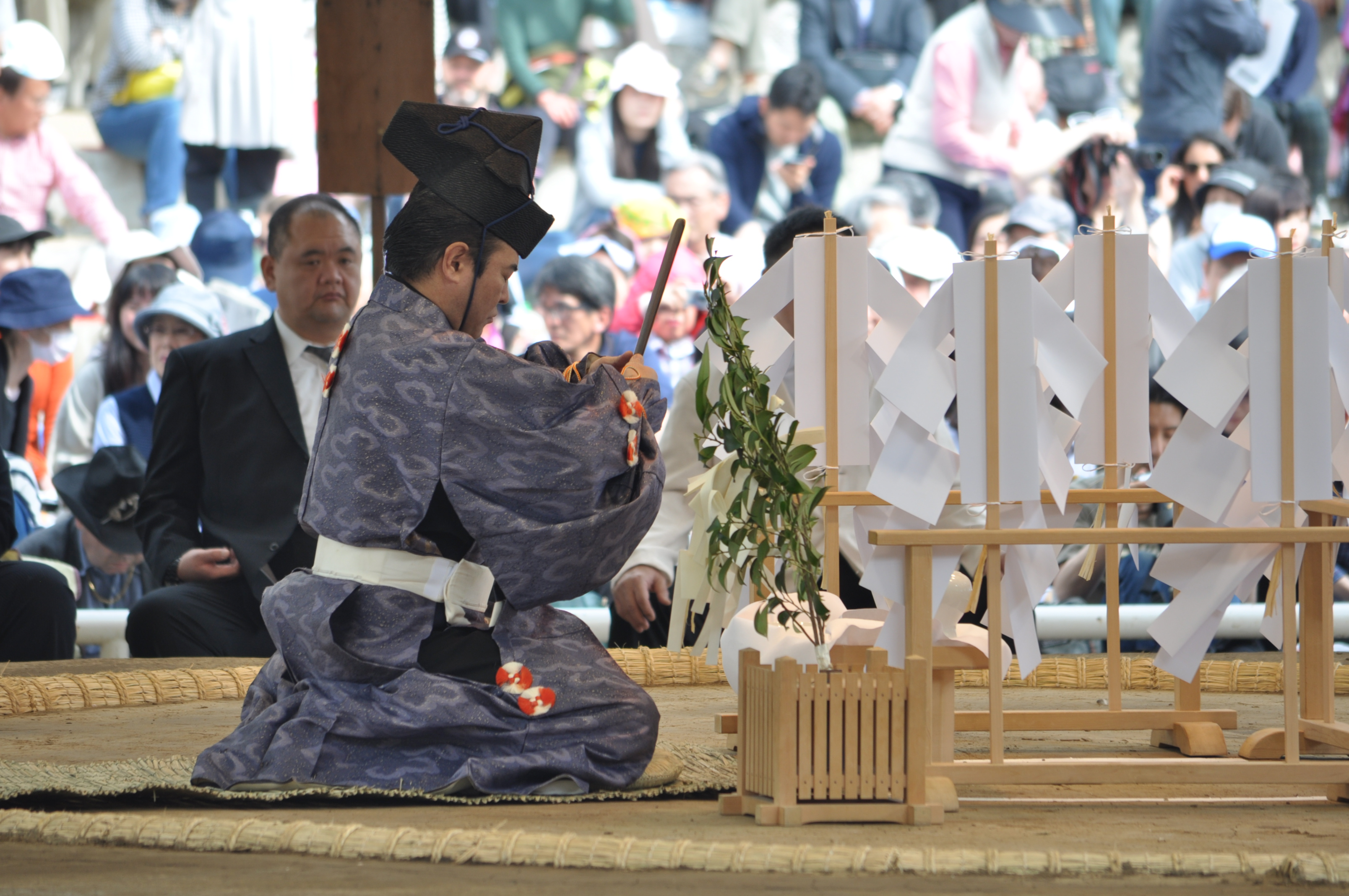
A makuuchi-ranked gyōji conducts the ceremony using a shaku.

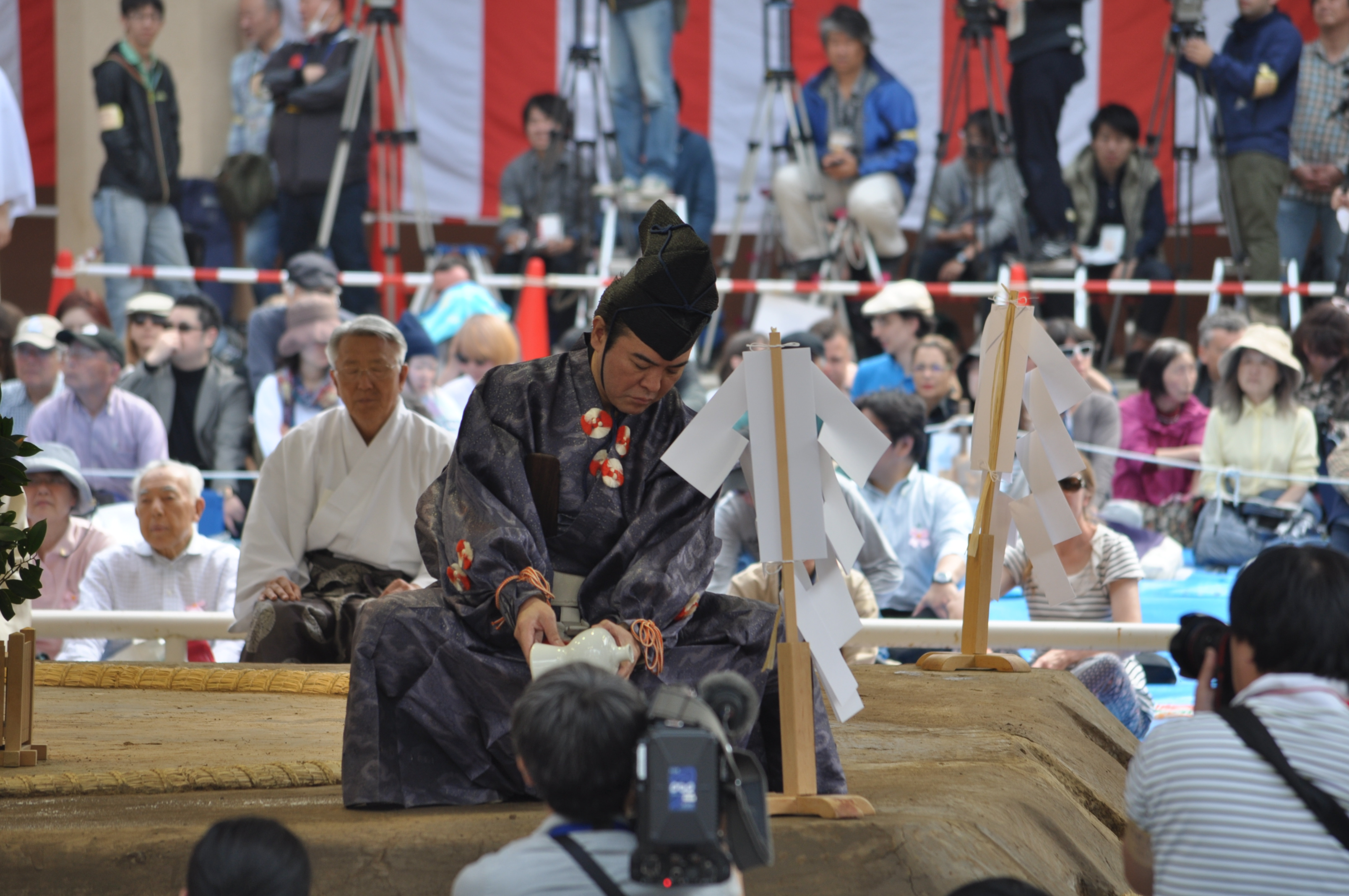
Sake is poured on all four sides of the ring for purification.

In addition to refereeing matches, gyōji have a number of other duties; among them are their religious responsibilities in the sport. When a new ring is built, it is the gyōji's responsibility to perform a dohyō-matsuri (lit. 'ring festival'), or ring-consecration ceremony, a ritual to bless the space in which the wrestlers fight and train. The day before a honbasho, the Japan Sumo Association holds a religious ceremony in the presence of all the association's higher-ups and all the san'yaku-ranked wrestlers who take their seats around the ring. The same day, a more discreet ceremony is held in the stables' training rings by junior-ranked referees belonging to the same clan, in the presence of the stablemaster and the wrestlers. A simplified version of the ceremony also takes place during regional tours (called jungyō). This practice, inherited from the Heian period, was restored by the Yoshida in the 1790s.

The dohyō-matsuri is performed by one of the tate-gyōji and two other senior-ranked referees, serving as attendants called wakigyōji (脇行司). The gyōji act as Shinto priests and perform the ceremony taking the shape of a Shinto rite. The three gyōji, dressed in the same way as a kannushi, wear formal white robes (called hō), larger eboshi hat, tabi socks and straw sandals. The tate-gyōji distinguishes himself by wearing a color variation under his white kimono and a kanmuri instead of an eboshi. All of the gyōji carry a wooden instrument (called a shaku) as a symbol of authority. On the dohyō, gohei (a Shinto ritual wand) are also placed in wooden stands at the center.

One of the tate-gyōji's two assistants first steps into the ring and behaves as if in a shrine, following Shinto etiquette. He then recites a prayer and walks around the four corners of the ring waving a sakaki tree branch serving as an ōnusa at the attendants, in an act called kiyoharae (清秡). The tate-gyōji then enters the ring and recites a prayer. This prayer to the three deities of sumo (Ame-no-Tajikarao, Takemikazuchi and Nomi no Sukune) and to the aspects of the seasons, is made for good weather throughout the tournament. This practice is inherited from a time when tournaments were held outdoors. The deities are also asked to bless all the wrestlers who will participate in the matches and keep them safe. The assistants in turn step into the ring and distribute the gohei from the center of the ring to its four corners. Sake is then poured by the assistants into the four outer corners of the ring, following the shape of the wrestlers' tegatana (first left, then right, then center). After the assistants have stepped down from the ring, the tate-gyōji recites a prayer called kojitsugonjō (故実言上).

From the beginning of the heavens and the earth, they were divided into yin and yang. That which is heavy and muddy is the yin and is below; and is called defeat [...]

— Extract from the kojitsugonjō.

Placed on a sanbō, symbolic offerings are brought to the ring. They consist of dried chestnuts, washed rice, kelp, dried cuttlefish, kombu and kaya nuts which are then poured into a hole in the center of the ring along some sake. The tate-gyōji then pours sake into the four inner corners of the ring. The remaining sake is then offered to the Japan Sumo Association executives seated around the ring.

After the end of a tournament, a gyōji bring the tournament to an end with a religious ceremony. This ceremony, called kami okuri (神送り), or 'god sending ceremony', is held the last day of a tournament to return the gods who had descended to the ring to heaven. One junior-ranked gyōji holding a gohei will stand in the center of the ring and will be tossed into the air by lower-ranked wrestlers.

=== Presiding over ring-entering ceremonies ===
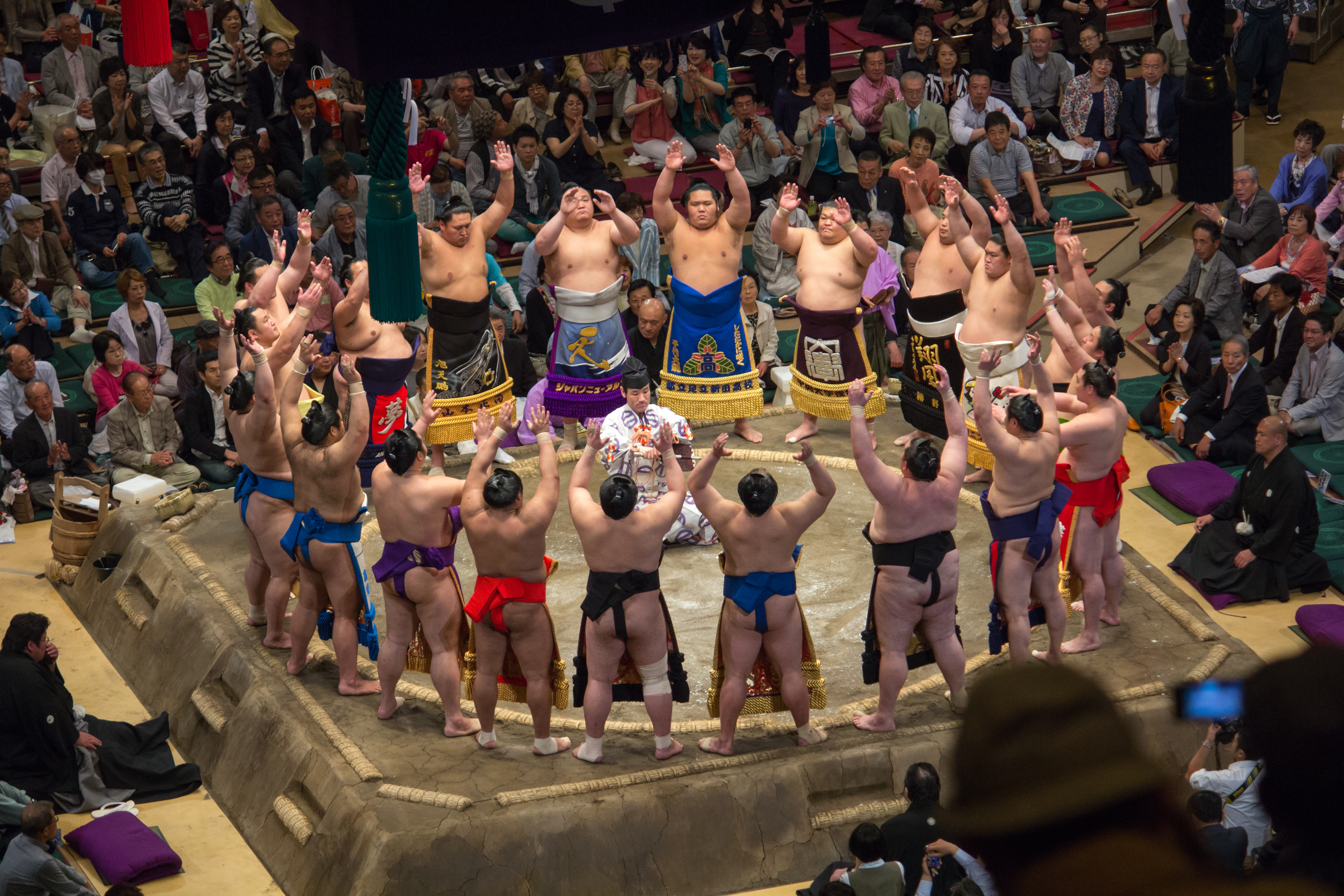
A makuuchi ring-entering ceremony in May 2014

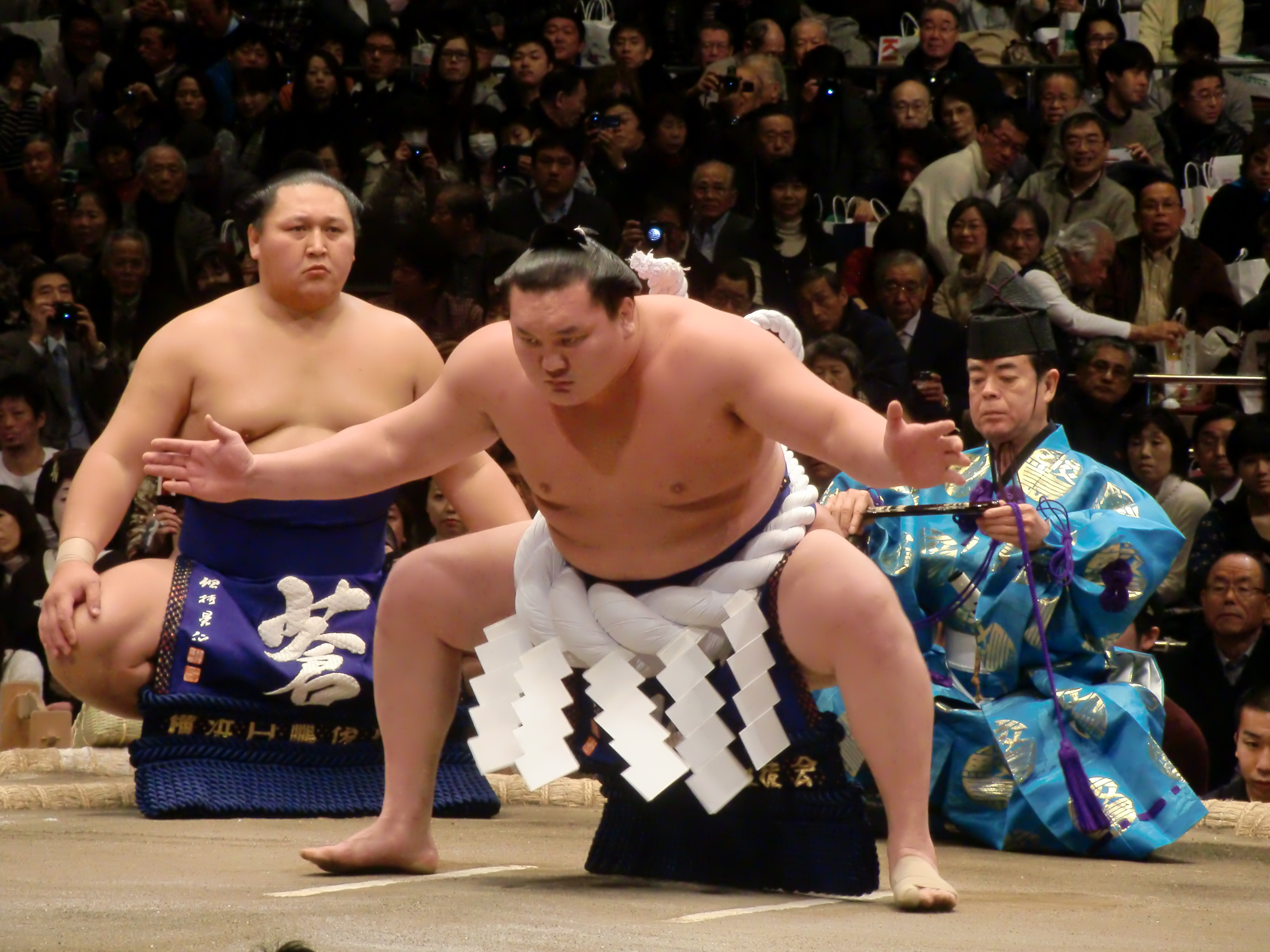
Yokozuna Hakuhō performs his shiranui ring-entering style in January 2012. Behind him presides the 36th Kimura Shōnosuke.

The gyōji also officially lead the ring-entering ceremonies. More precisely, the gyōji's responsibility is to head the columns of sekitori-ranked wrestlers, leading them from the hanamichi, the two paths from east and west, to the ring. If the gyōji is absent, the wrestlers are normally expected to wait to be led into the ring. The gyōji's rank is equivalent to that of the wrestlers he leads. Each gyōji who presides over ring-entering ceremonies takes charge of only three or four per tournament, rotating with their colleagues of equivalent rank.

The gyōji enters the ring first, circles it and then settles in the center. The wrestlers, in ascending rank, follow him, and a gyōji at the foot of the ring announces the prefecture of origin (or country, in the case of foreign wrestlers), the stable to which they belong and the shikona of the wrestler stepping onto the dohyō. When the last wrestler, ranked at the top of the jūryō or, in the case of the makuuchi division, the ōzeki, steps into the ring, the wrestlers turn to perform ritual gestures facing the center of the ring. The gyōji in the center waves the rope (fusa) of his gunbai in a circle.

During the yokozuna's ring-entering ceremony, the gyōji is also responsible for leading the wrestlers into the ring before the tsuyuharai (the wrestler preceding the yokozuna). Normally, the tate-gyōji presides over this ceremony. In the absence of a tate-gyōji, the referee presiding over the yokozuna ceremony will be a san'yaku-ranked gyōji. The gyōji stands behind the yokozuna, waving the rope of his gunbai as the yokozuna makes his signature entrance (shiranui or unryū).

=== Writing the banzuke ===
The gyōji are also responsible for writing up the banzuke, the traditional ranking sheet for professional sumo, and their task begins long before a definitive ranking is decided. The gyōji act as clerks at the ranking meetings, which take place three days after the end of each tournament. During the preparatory meeting, the gyōji serve only as observers and are not invited to speak. Three gyōji are responsible for recording decisions on promotions and demotions, and their work is then used as the basis for the calligraphy known to the public.

The gyōji did not start writing the banzuke until 1944; prior to this date it was often written by the elders of the association or by the professionals responsible for printing it. Only two or three high-ranking gyōji are authorised to write the banzuke, which will later be reproduced and actually used. This team is usually composed of one senior (usually ranked in san'yaku) and one or two assistants. The senior writer is usually also one of the gyōji attending the ranking meeting. Since World War II, only eight gyōji have been responsible for editing the banzuke. The task of writing the banzuke is considered so important that the people responsible for writing it never accompany the JSA on tour, so as to devote themselves entirely to their task.

In line with the calligraphic skills of the gyōji, the ranking is handwritten in a style called negishi-ryū (根岸流) or sumō-ji (相撲字). This style of writing is similar to that developed in the mid-18th century to write advertisements for kabuki plays. The official name of the style, negishi-ryū, is derived from the name of a printer called Mikawa Jiemon who, in 1757, was in charge of printing the banzuke. He later became an elder of the association under the name Negishi, thus giving the name to the style he used when writing. The characters are written thickly and without gaps, which is meant to represent the hope that the tournament venue will be filled to capacity. Another interpretation of the size of the characters is that they imitate the imposing physique of the wrestlers.

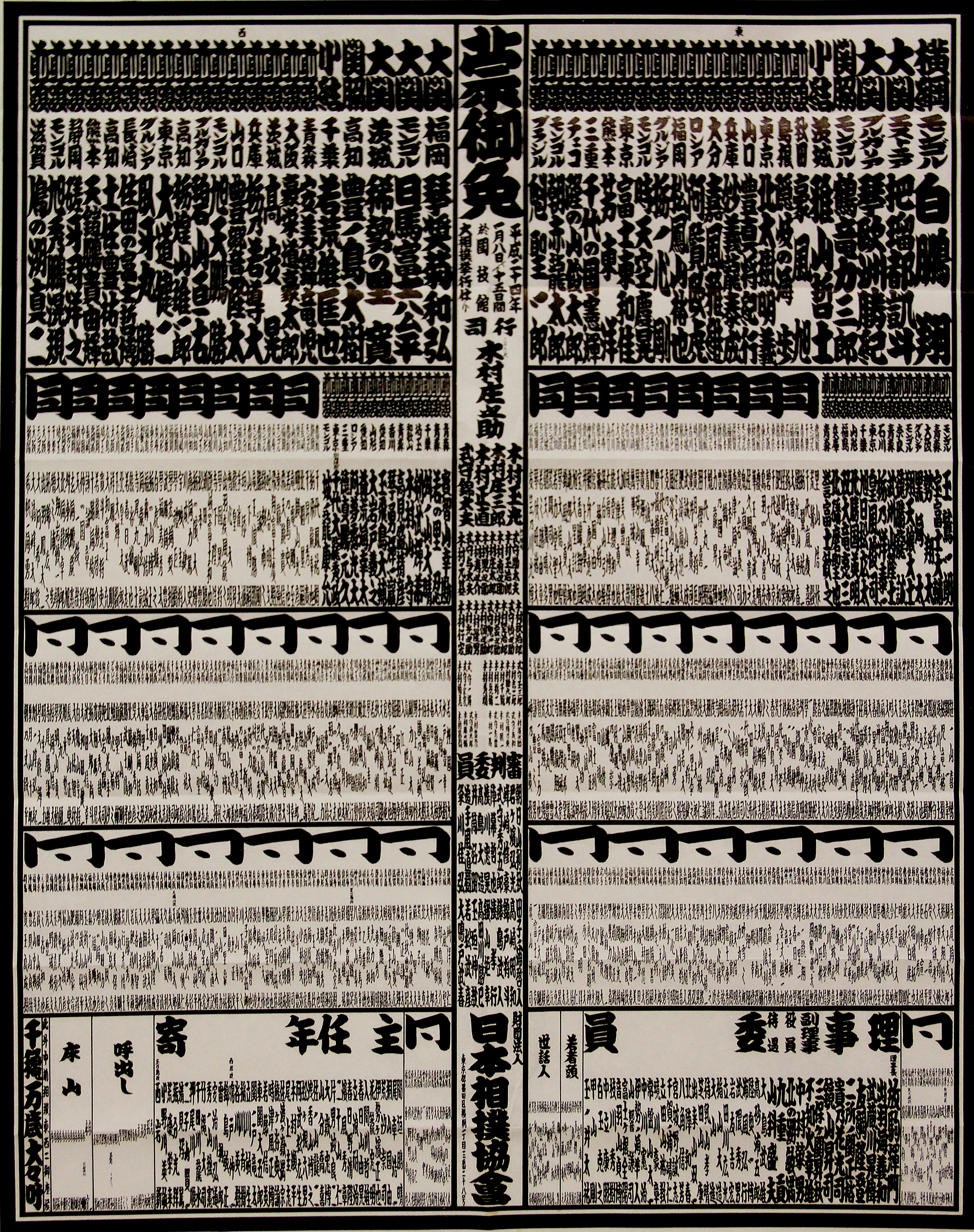
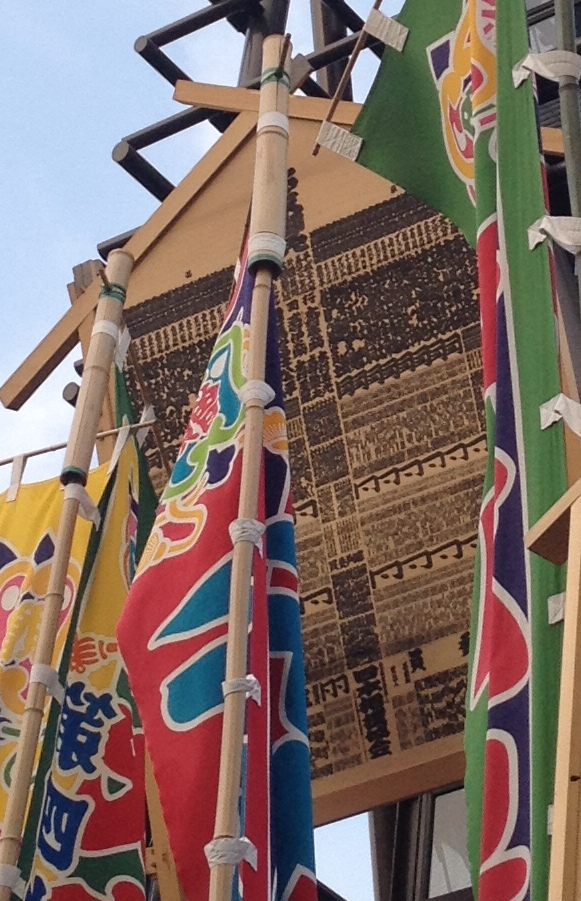
Both the banzuke (left) and the ita-banzuke (right) are written by the gyōji.

Before each main tournament, it takes between seven and ten days to handwrite the banzuke. Each kanji is written with a brush without the help of word processors. Gyōji are also expected to write the banzuke with their right hand. The original banzuke is called a motogaki (元書き). It is a large sheet of paper measuring 1.10 m (3 ft 7 1/2 in) metres by 80 cm (2 ft 7 1/2 in). The assistant draws the frame of the future banzuke on a blank sheet of paper, an operation that alone takes two days as everything is done by hand. In the lower left-hand section of the motogaki, the senior gyōji write vertically the sentence Senshū banzai daidaikanō (千穐万歳大々叶), a prayer for the wrestlers' safety in the ring. The writing then begins from bottom to top and from left to right, so as to start with the lowest ranks and end with the rank of yokozuna. There is a tradition that for the smallest ranks, written in an extremely fine way, the gyōji use an old brush whose bristles have all fallen off and given by a gyōji who taught him. In total, around 830 names are handwritten. After being written up and proofread, the motogaki is sent to the printing works for photoengraving and printing on a format four times smaller than the original.

While the banzuke is written by senior gyōji, the ita-banzuke is written by young referees. After the banzuke has been unveiled, between two and three gyōji ranked in makushita gather to write on the 2 m (6 ft 6 1/2 in) high and 1.5 m (4 ft 11 in) wide wooden board traditionally hung at the entrance to tournament venues.

=== Other tasks ===
In line with their refereeing duties, the gyōji are also divided into departments within the Sumo Association, as are the elders. The distribution of gyōji in these departments depends on the tate-gyōji and on a committee of three senior referees (currently ranked as makuuchi and san'yaku) who are elected every two years by their peers.

For the gyōji, there are three departments with very specific tasks. The first department is the wariba (割場), named after the rooms in the Kokugikan. This department is responsible for recording the results of matches held the previous day on the maki (巻) scroll, to prepare for the work of the judging department, which will decide on future wrestler matchups for upcoming matches. The second department to which the gyōji belong is that of the referees who stand close to the ring during matches and announce over the microphone which kimarite (winning technique) have been used by the wrestlers. Since all referees are also expected to referee in the ring, a team of ten gyōji rotate with each other at the microphone for one day. In addition, the announcers are all from the Kantō region, so as to maintain a standard of intelligibility by avoiding accents. If the referee making the announcement did not see the technique used, he may contact the video referee to confirm it. The third department is entirely dedicated to the publication of wrestlers' results.

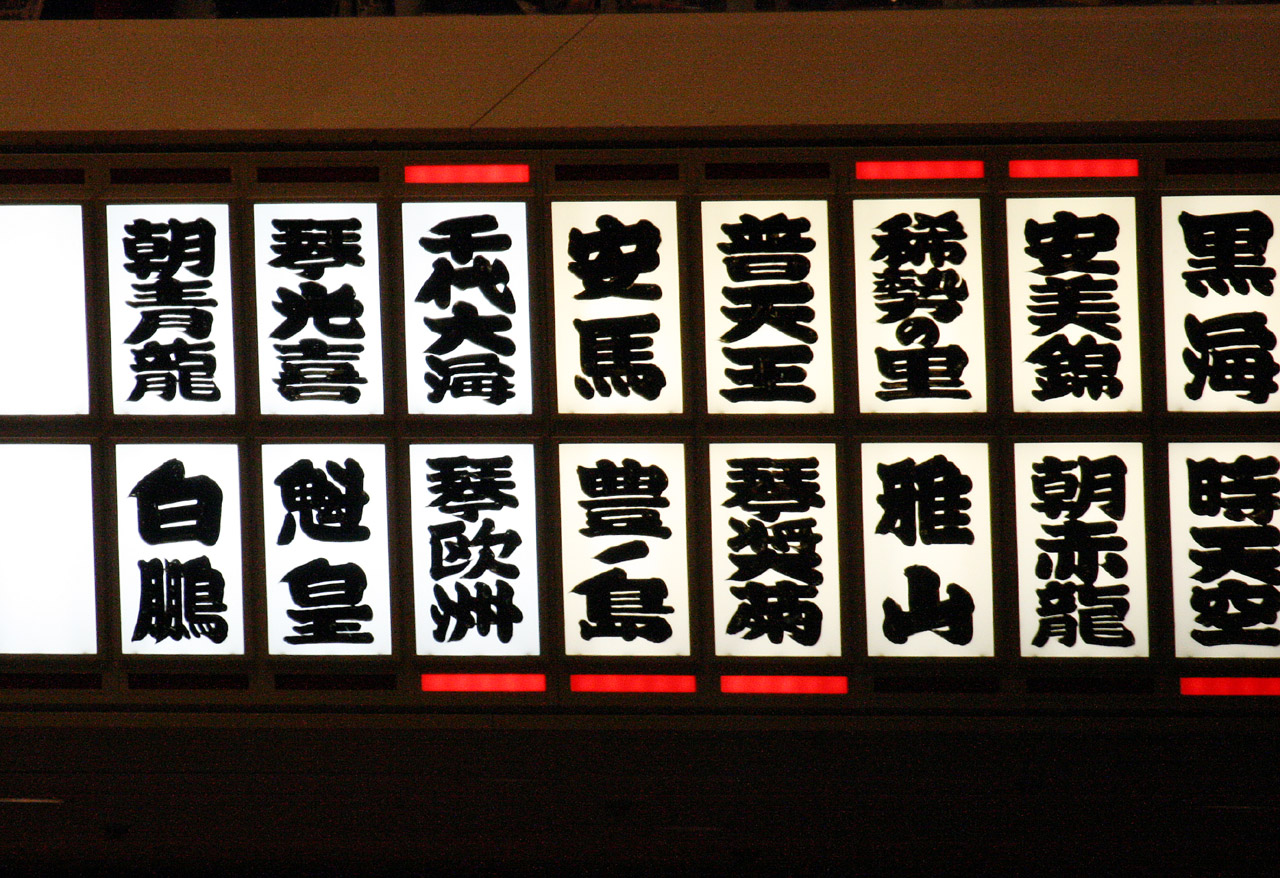
Scoreboard plaques are handwritten by the gyōji.

Once the matches have been decided, it is up to the gyōji to write up the sheets (called kaobure gonjō) that will be presented after the makuuchi ring entry ceremonies on tournament days.

The gyōji also make the plaques displayed on the electronic scoreboards in the arenas, on a thin rectangular sheet of plastic. Plaques are changed when a wrestler changes his shikona or is promoted. In addition, gyōji are also responsible for the material organization of tours (called jungyō). This takes place a year and a half in advance, and includes preparation of itineraries and accommodation.

Finally, as all gyōji are also associated with one of the sumo training stables throughout their career, they also have individual duties related to the stables such as performing clerical work.

== Controversies ==
In January 2018, the 40th Shikimori Inosuke (whose real name is Itsuo Nōchi) was suspended for three tournaments for sexually harassing a junior referee. The Japan Sumo Association accepted his resignation in May 2018 when the suspension concluded.

Shortly after the announcement of banzuke promotions for the January 2024 grand sumo tournament, the 6th Kimura Tamajirō (from Tatsunami stable) submitted his retirement papers to the Sumo Association, ending a 47-year career. The day before, he did not appear on the list of referees promoted, even though he was the second most senior referee at the time and only two years away from retirement. Sasaki Ichirō, a sumo journalist at Nikkan Sports, shared an informal comment on his Twitter account expressing Tamajirō VI's displeasure at not being promoted to the rank of tate-gyōji.

In January 2025, jūryō-ranked gyōji Kimura Kankurō was suspended for the 2025 March tournament and was given a pay cut after he was found to have physically assaulted one of his apprentices during the 2024 November tournament. He had previously been excluded from the January tournament from day eight, when the internal investigation was launched.

In May 2025 it was reported that the Sumo Association's compliance committee was investigating allegations that an unnamed gyōji who managed the reserve fund of the rikishi-kai (wrestlers' association, composed of active sekitori competitors) embezzled money from that fund, portions of which were designated to support children affected by the 2011 Tōhoku earthquake and tsunami. According to the report, the gyōji repeatedly deferred requests by the rikishi-kai to disclose the fund's books and balance. During the investigation, the gyōji reportedly confessed to spending tens of millions of yen on gambling and other activities. On 2 June 2025 the Sumo Association decided to dismiss makuuchi-gyōji Kimura Ginjirō (Shibatayama stable), identified as the individual who embezzled approximately ¥20 million from the fund.

== See also ==
- Glossary of sumo terms
- List of sumo stables
- List of years in sumo
- Other personnel of the Japan Sumo Association
