= Yobidashi =

Traditional handyman in professional sumo wrestling

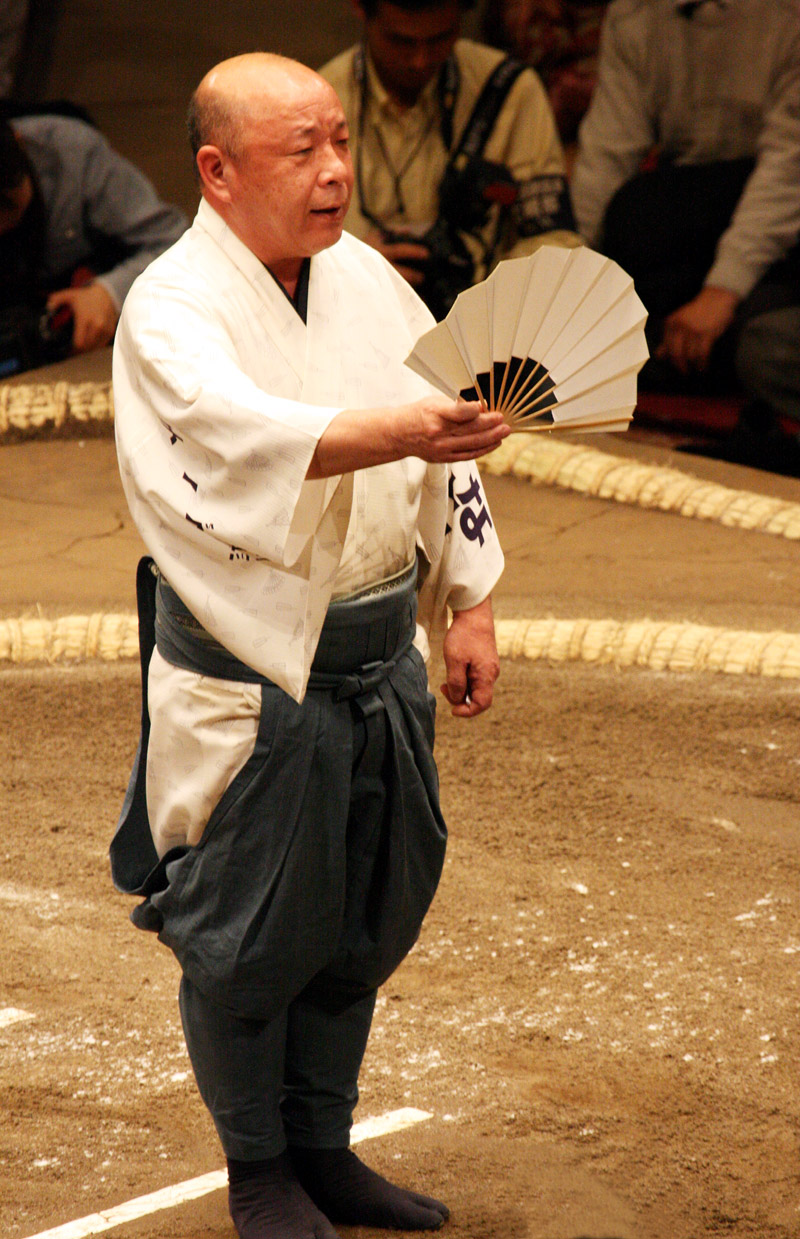
Hideo, tate-yobidashi at the May 2008 tournament

A yobidashi (呼出 or 呼び出し; lit. 'call'), often translated in English as "usher", "ring attendant", or "ring announcer", is an employee of the Japan Sumo Association, responsible for various tasks essential to the traditional running of professional sumo tournaments (honbasho) in Japan. The yobidashi are involved in building the dohyō (wrestling ring) or calling wrestlers (rikishi) to the ring when it is their turn to fight. They are also entrusted with other roles, both administrative and artistic, in the service of the stable to which they are attached.

Established during the Heian period, the role of yobidashi was not codified until the Tenmei era. Nicknamed "sumo's workhorses" by former sekiwake Takamiyama, the yobidashi are required to wear traditional clothing in public and are subject to a strict hierarchy in their organisation.

== History ==
The status of yobidashi did not appear until 1750. Before the appearance of this term to specifically designate the staff responsible for announcing the wrestlers, several different terms were used over time to designate the yobidashi. During the Heian period, there was a role known as fushō (奏上), who was responsible for presenting the wrestlers to the emperor and the nobility who attended the matches. During the Edo period, the role became more codified, the staff responsible for calling the wrestlers inherited the name maegyōji (前行司), meaning 'preceding referees'. Later came the terms fure (触れ) and nanori (名乗り), both of which also mean 'to announce something', to refer more specifically to the personnel announcing the wrestlers. Since in earlier times the yobidashi would sit down on their heels in the middle of the ring when the wrestlers arrived and call them by name, they inherited another name: tsubaki gyōji, meaning 'squatting referees'.

== Career and ranking ==
The maximum number of yobidashi allowed in the Sumo Association is 45. As of August 2025, there are 44 yobidashi within the Sumo Association.

Yobidashi are employees of the Japan Sumo Association, but like the wrestlers, they are affiliated with the stables. Like gyōji, new yobidashi recruits can only begin their career under the age of 19 and must have completed compulsory education. Most enter at 15, and it is not uncommon for most to be wrestlers who have not managed to break through but are keen to stay in professional sumo. They then work up a career ladder roughly based on the ranking system for wrestlers until their retirement at 65. The current ranking system was created in July 1993 and consists of the following nine ranks:

- tate-yobidashi (立呼出)
- fuku-tate-yobidashi (副立呼出)
- san'yaku-yobidashi (三役呼出)
- makuuchi-yobidashi (幕内呼出)
- jūryō-yobidashi (十両呼出)
- makushita-yobidashi (幕下呼出)
- sandanme-yobidashi (三段目呼出)
- jonidan-yobidashi (序二段呼出)
- jonokuchi-yobidashi (序ノ口呼出)

Promotion through these ranks is based primarily on experience, although ability is also taken into account, particularly in promotions to the top ranks. Junior yobidashi however undergo six months of theoretical training in one of the Kokugikan's training rooms under the tutelage of their seniors. It takes around 15 years for a yobidashi to be promoted from the bottom of the hierarchy to the rank of jūryō-yobidashi. The makuuchi-yobidashi are promoted only after 30 years of service. Tate-yobidashi are not generally promoted until they have 45 to 50 years of experience. Most of these ranks clearly follow those for the ranking of rikishi, or wrestlers, with the exception of the tate and fuku-tate ranks, which stand for chief and deputy chief, respectively. This system is identical to that applied for gyōji. Prior to July 1993, yobidashi were simply ranked first-class, second-class and so on.

While a tate-yobidashi earns between 360,000 and 400,000 yen ($2,513, or €2,313 as of November 2023) a month, the average Japanese salary for a salaryman, a young apprentice earns just 14,000 yen ($97, or €89 in November 2023) a month. In the past, yobidashi lived on tips alone. In the same way that low-ranking wrestlers are deprived of certain freedoms, junior yobidashi are also forbidden to live anywhere other than in their stable and are not allowed to marry while sekitori-ranked yobidashi are allowed these liberties and have a tsukebito assigned to them. The tasks that are undue to a yobidashi depend on his rank, although all yobidashi are versatile, with the highest ranks appearing at the end of the day and performing tasks that put them in the public eye.

From October 2019 to September 2023, the tate-yobidashi position was vacant after the incumbent, Takuro (Kasugano stable), was suspended for two tournaments and announced his retirement for hitting a junior yobidashi over the head after he caught him eating in the customer seating area on jungyō. In September 2023, however, it was announced that Jirō (also from Kasugano stable), would be promoted by two ranks to become tate-yobidashi from December 25 of the same year, when the banzuke for the January 2024 tournament was released. On the same date, the fuku-tate-yobidashi role–vacant since November 2015–was taken up by Katsuyuki (Shibatayama stable). After the retirement of Jirō, the role of tate-yobidashi became vacant again. In October 2025, it was announced that Katsuyuki (Shibatayama stable) would be promoted to tate-yobidashi, and Shirō (Ōtake stable) would be elevated to fuku-tate-yobidashi, effective with the January 2026 tournament.

== Responsibilities ==
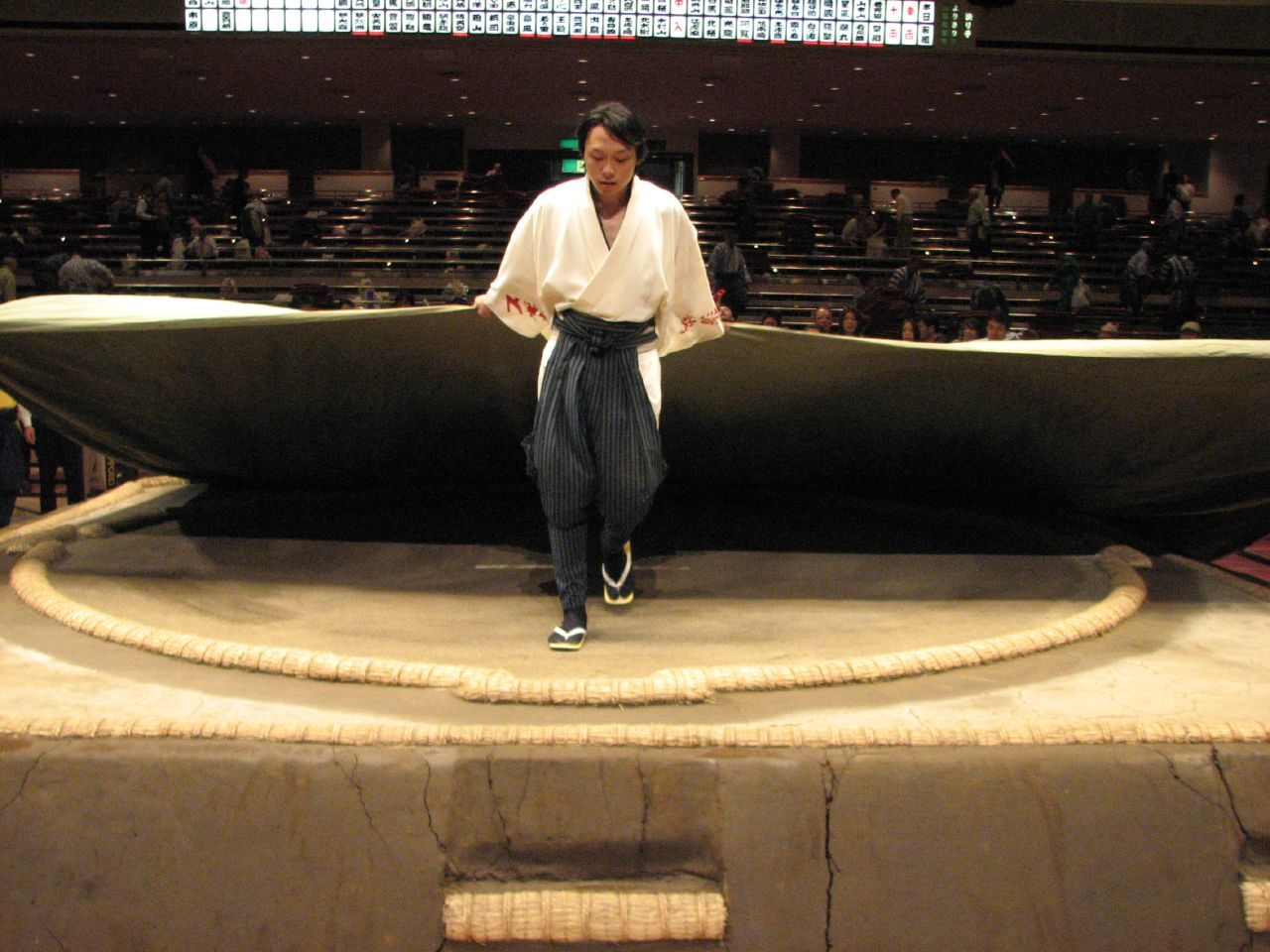
After a tournament day is over, the yobidashi cover the dohyō

During the tournament, yobidashi are by far the busiest workers, staying for the whole of the fighting days, staying on site from 7:30 am to 6 pm. These tasks begin before the official opening of the tournaments (honbasho) with the construction of the dohyō (sumo ring).

=== Building the ring ===
Construction begins five days before the first day of the tournament (shonichi). 40 tonnes of a special clay, called Arakida, collected in the town of Kawagoe (Saitama Prefecture) are needed for its construction and the yobidashi use small trucks to transport the materials. As well as building the ring, the yobidashi are also responsible for the facing of the tsuriyane (the suspended roof above the dohyō). Supervision of the construction does not necessarily fall to the tate-yobidashi. Depending on their skills, a san'yaku-yobidashi may also supervise the construction of the ring. During jungyō (tours), not all yobidashi are present, and it is not uncommon for local volunteers to help with dohyō construction.

=== Calling the wrestlers ===
The yobidashi's most emblematic task is to call the wrestlers into the ring for their match of the day. Dressed traditionally and holding a simple white fan, they call the wrestlers by their shikona, or ring-name, in a high-pitched and melodious way. The use of a fan was originally intended to prevent droplets of saliva from soiling the sacred surface of the dohyō. Because of the large number of wrestlers in the divisions, the yobidashi are known to use cheat sheets to not make any mistakes. On odd-numbered days, the call is made from the east, then the west, and on even-numbered days the call is made in the other way round.

=== Other tasks ===
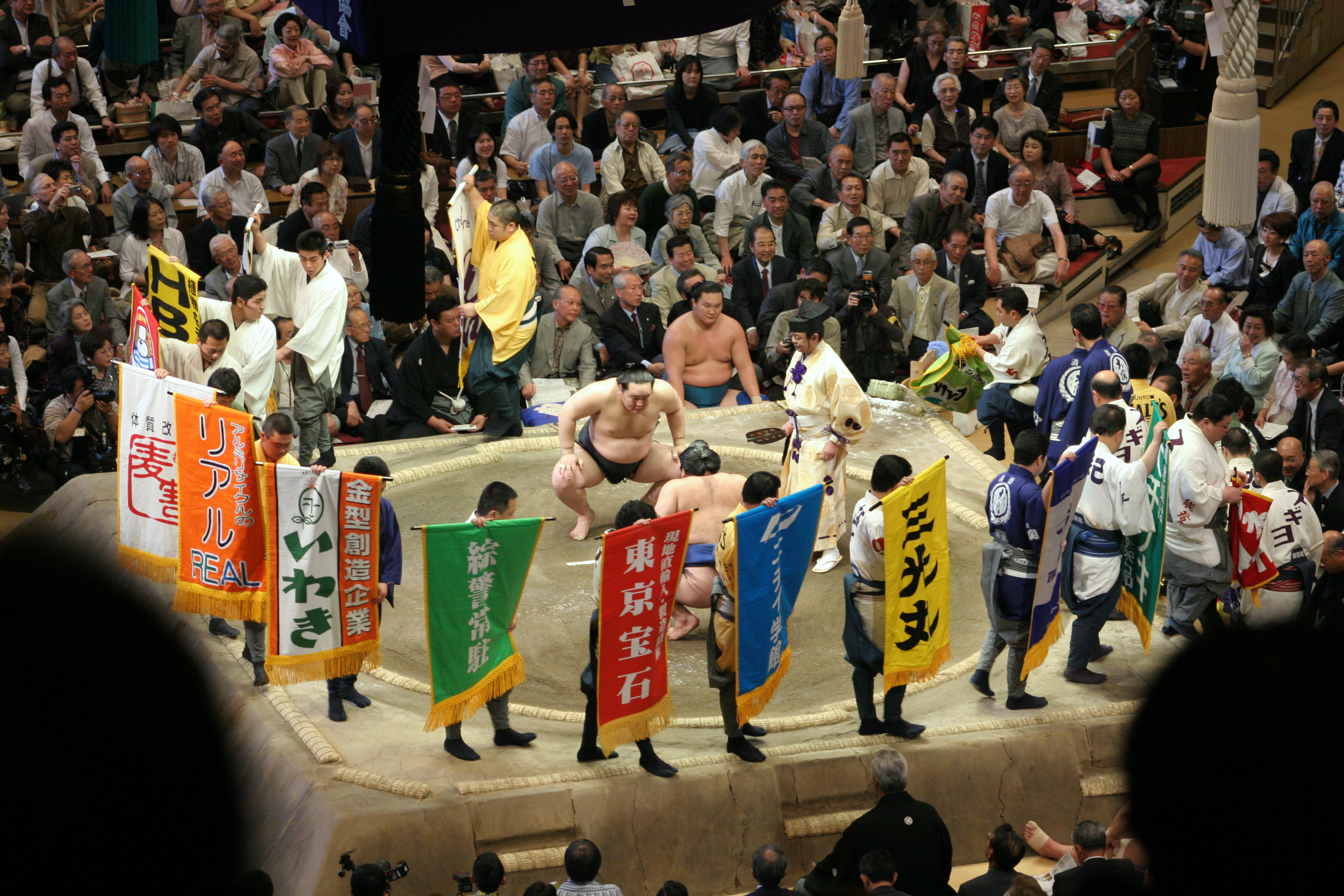
The kenshō (advertising) banners before a match

Another recognisable task of the yobidashi is parading the kenshō (advertising) banners around the ring before particular match-ups between popular wrestlers, which are often sponsored by companies. The yobidashi are responsible for banging the taiko drum at different times of the day. Originally, these different times were used to convey different messages to spectators outside the arena. The first drum sound is the ichiban-daiko (一番太鼓), played during the 15 days of the tournaments, for 30 minutes from 8 am to announce the opening of a day of matches. At the end of the day, immediately after the yumitori-shiki (bow-twirling) ceremony, the hane-daiko (跳ね太鼓) is played to invite spectators leaving the arena to disperse. Before the Second World War, the yobidashi took part in the tours separately and by ichimon (clan), therefore the method used to beat the drum was different and these variations are traditionally preserved today, even if all yobidashi now take part in the tours equally. High-ranking yobidashi finally accompany sekitori-ranked wrestlers in their dohyō-iri ring-entering ceremonies by sounding their hyōshigi, an instrument consisting of two pieces of cherry wood tied together with a cord.

Other tasks on match days include: sweeping the ring, providing purification salt, handing towels to wrestlers, displaying banners showing that a match has been decided by default (usually due to a competitor's withdrawal), or subject to a rematch after the next two bouts, and ensuring that, during a bout, no wrestler injures himself on the bucket of chikara-mizu (power water) situated at each east and west side of the ring. The yobidashi are also responsible for bringing the thick cushions of the makuuchi-ranked wrestlers to the ring, which are handed to them by the tsukebito (assistant) who come out of the changing rooms. Junior yobidashi also help senior gyōji during the kaobure gonjō ceremony. Less publicly, yobidashi also take care of many small requests made by the Sumo Association executives on judging duty or guard duty in the corridors, such as fetching drinks or cigarettes.

Nevertheless, the responsibility for yobidashi is not simply confined to tournament days. As yobidashi, like wrestlers, belong to the stables, they are also entrusted with tasks by their stablemasters, such as running errands or keeping track of wrestlers' progress during training sessions. When a stable goes on tour in the odd-numbered months, the yobidashi are also responsible for making the necessary arrangements to reserve accommodation for the masters and wrestlers. When a stable's keikoba (training area) needs rebuilding, yobidashi from the same ichimon, to which the stable belongs, take charge of the construction.

It is also traditional for yobidashi to write folk songs, called jinku, based on sumo life.

== Ring names ==
Yobidashi take a single name as their ring name, unlike both the wrestlers (rikishi) and gyōji who have both a surname and given name. This may be related to the practice of the Edo period in Japan whereby only samurai-class persons could hold a surname. The wrestlers (involved in a martial activity) and gyōji (who were lettered) could be construed as having positions consistent with a samurai status, while the yobidashi did not. As in most traditional Japanese activities, the professional name of the yobidashi is sometimes derived from the name of the master who taught them, borrowing a kanji from the master's name.

As from July 1993 the upper ranked yobidashi also have their names automatically included on the banzuke, the ranking sheet produced prior to each honbasho. With the exception of a period around the Kansei era to Bunsei era, only the gyōji had traditionally been included on the banzuke alongside the wrestlers and their training masters, or oyakata.

== Uniform ==
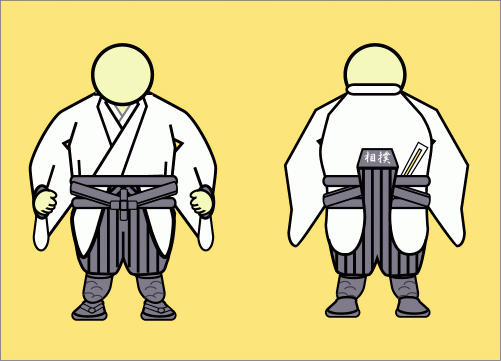
Traditional outfit of a yobidashi.

The outfit worn by the yobidashi is loosely based on an old style Japanese workman's outfit, with tatsuke-bakama (裁着袴), working trousers, and tabi socks. The kimono worn by the yobidashi often displays sponsors' names in black characters and logo. As there are seven sponsors of the Sumo Association referred to as "yobidashi partners" as of October 2025, each yobidashi has seven different kimono which he wears during all 15 days of each basho. The costume is the same for senior and junior ranked yobidashi and only the kimono worn on the torso varies in color and the names on the back. Since the kimono display the logos and names of the sponsors, it is often offered by them and the yobidashi rarely choose the colors of their kimono. Their hakama colors and designs, on the other hand, are often decided within an ichimon, but it can also be presented by rikishi who have been promoted to ōzeki or yokozuna as a commemorative gift and the shikona, or ring name, of the said wrestler can be seen at top of the back of the hakama, in place of the name of the stable to which the yobidashi belongs, which is normally found there.

== See also ==
- List of sumo stables
- Heya, sumo stable
- Other personnel of the Japan Sumo Association
