= Dohyō =

Ring used for sumo wrestling

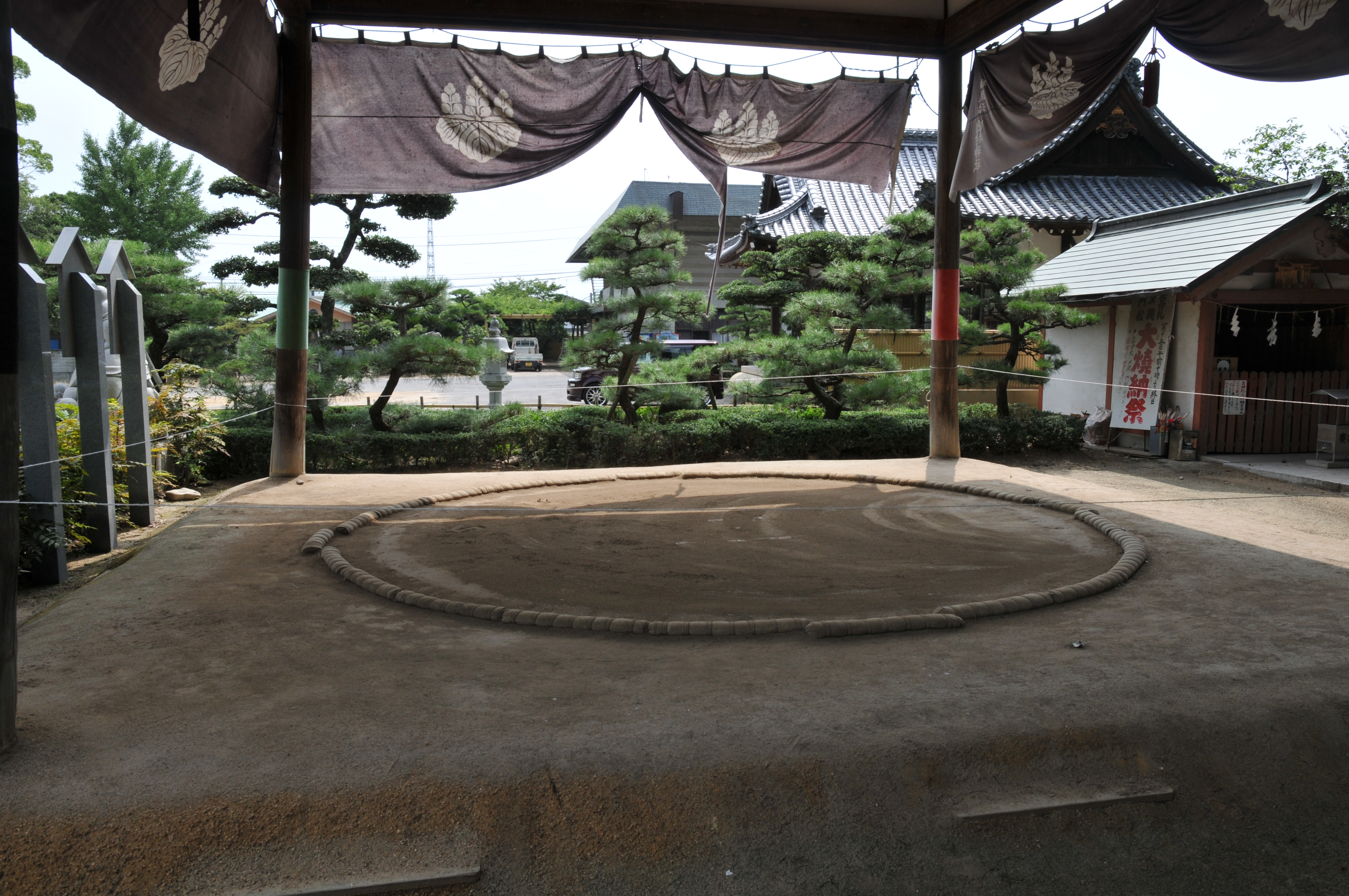
A dohyō in Takamatsu

A dohyō (土俵, Japanese pronunciation: [doçoː]) is the ring in which a sumo wrestling bout occurs. A typical dohyō is a circle 4.55 m (15 ft) in diameter, bounded by partially buried rice-straw bales. In official professional tournaments (honbasho), it is mounted on a square platform of clay 34–60 cm (13–24 in) high and 6.7 m (22 ft) wide on each side.

== Configuration and construction ==
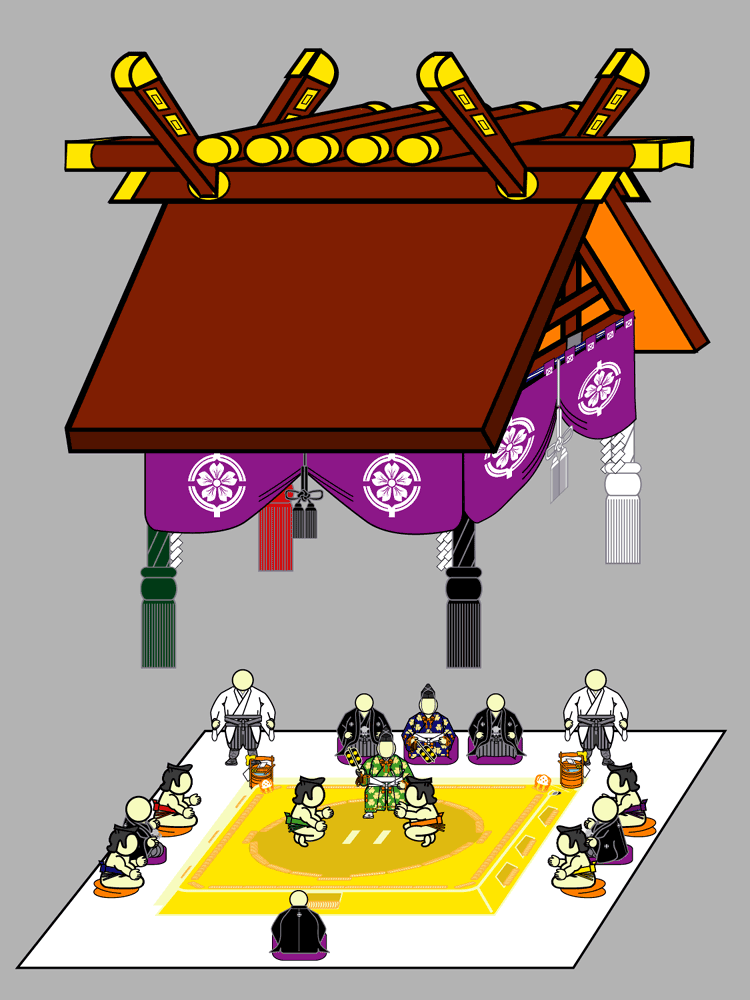
Illustration showing a dohyō in use at a modern professional match

In professional sumo, a new dohyō is built prior to each tournament by the yobidashi (ring attendants), who are responsible for this activity. The process of building the dohyō and its platform takes three days and is done with traditional tools. The clay used is taken from the banks of the Arakawa River in Saitama Prefecture. However, due to growing urbanization, clay from Ibaraki Prefecture has started to be used. The surface is covered by sand. In the Tokyo honbasho, the dohyō is retracted beneath the floor of the Ryōgoku Kokugikan and is repaired before the following tournament. Outside of Tokyo, the dohyō is dismantled after each tournament and in Nagoya, pieces are taken home by the fans as souvenirs. The yobidashi also build the dohyō for training stables and sumo touring events (jungyō), the latter of which are made from a lighter core of polystyrene foam blocks covered by sand.

The diameter of the ring is 15 shaku (4.55 m), which increased from 13 shaku (3.94 m or 13 ft) in 1931. The height of the dohyō can vary from 34 centimetres (13 in) to 60 centimetres (24 in), but has been standardized at 1 shaku 9 sun (58 cm; 23 in) for tournaments outside Tokyo. In 2026, the dohyō at the Ryōgoku Kokugikan has been lowered to 1 shaku 8 sun (55 cm; 21 in) due to clearance issues with the retraction mechanism. The rice-straw bales (tawara (俵)) which form the ring are one third standard size and are partially buried in the clay of the dohyō. Four of the tawara are placed slightly outside the line of the circle at the four cardinal directions; these are called privileged bales (tokudawara). Originally, this was to allow rain to run off the surface, when sumo tournaments were held outdoors in the open. Today, a wrestler under pressure at the edge of the ring will often try to move himself round to one of these points to gain leverage in order to push back more effectively against the opponent who is trying to force him out.

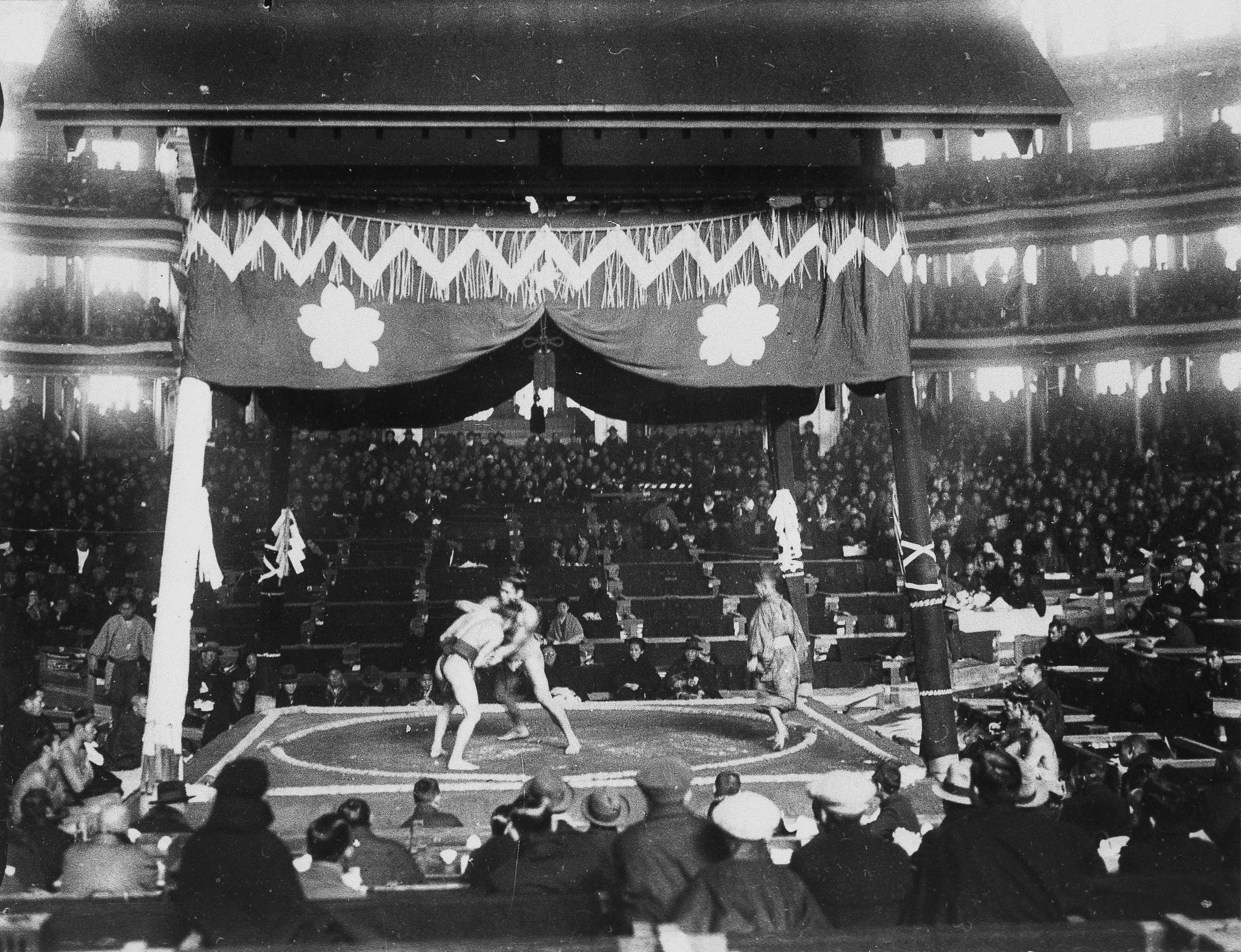
Match at the Ryōgoku Kokugikan c. 1910, note the posts in the corners of the dohyō holding up the roof

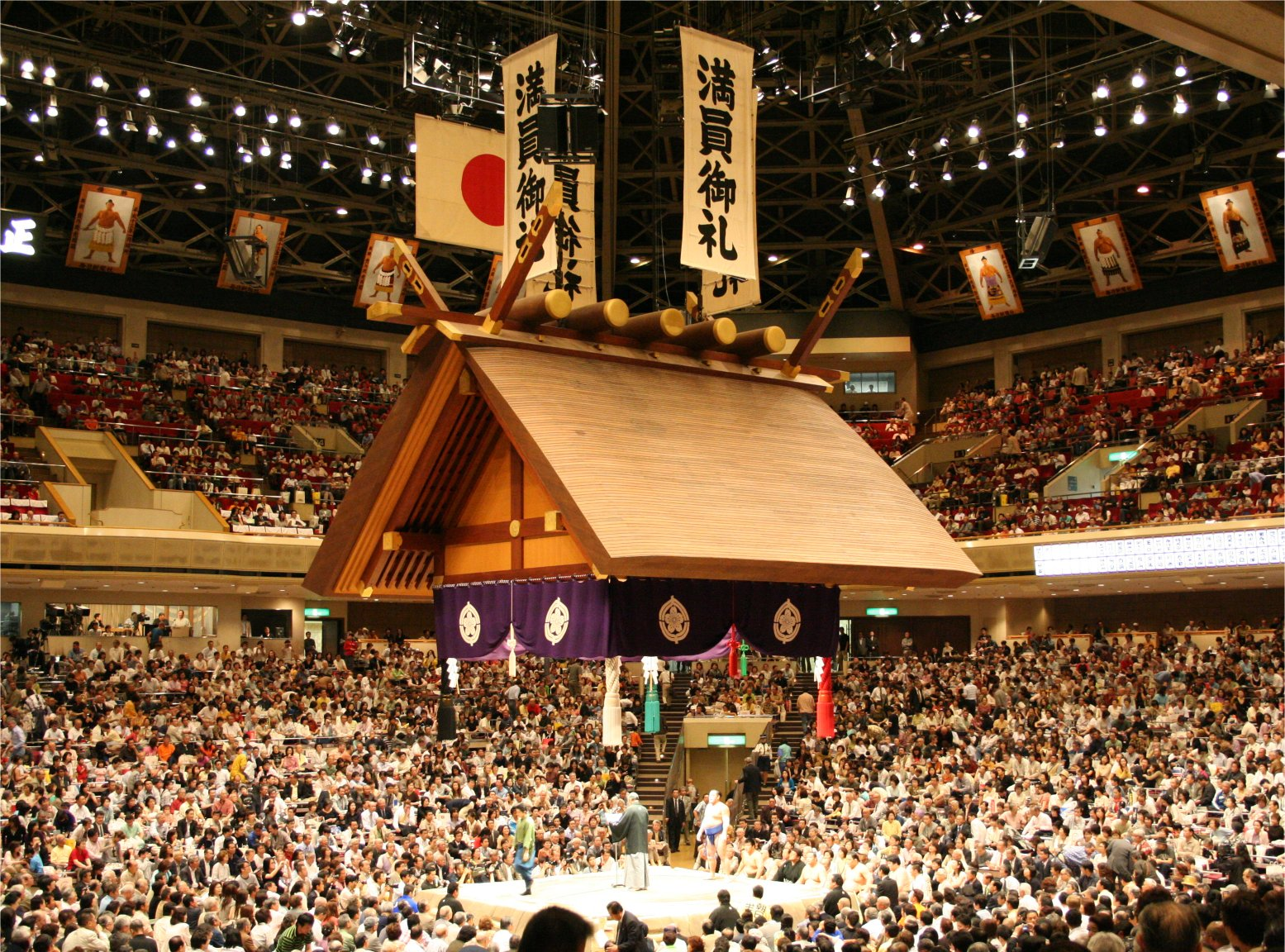
The Ryōgoku Kokugikan in 2006, note the suspended roof and hanging tassels

At the center are two white lines, the shikiri-sen (仕切り線), behind which the wrestlers must position themselves at the start of the bout. First introduced in the spring tournament of 1928, they are painted 90 cm (35 in) long, 6 cm (2 3/8 in) wide and 70 cm (28 in) apart. The shikiri-sen are touched up by yobidashi at the end of each day with white enamel paint. The painted lines are notably slicker than the surrounding dirt, but rarely cause a wrestler to slip due to their narrowness. Around the ring is finely brushed sand called the ja-no-me (蛇の目, snake's eye), which can be used to determine if a wrestler has just touched his foot, or another part of his body, outside the ring. The yobidashi ensure this is clean of any previous marks immediately prior to each bout.

At the Ryōgoku Kokugikan, a roof resembling that of a Shinto shrine (which has been of the Shinmei-zukuri style since the May 1953 tournament) is suspended above the dohyō, called the tsuriyane. The roof weighs 6.25 tons and is supported by cables that can hold up to 30 tons. Around the tsuriyane hangs a purple banner which is embroidered with the Japan Sumo Association's mon. Prior to the September 1952 tournament, the tsuriyane had been supported by columns, but they were removed to allow fans an uninterrupted view of the dohyō. Colored tassels (fusa), which replaced the colored columns, are suspended from the corners. They represent the four seasons and the four spirits of directions:

- Green – Azure Dragon of the East (青龍), Spring
- Red – Vermilion Bird of the South (朱雀), Summer
- White – White Tiger of the West (白虎), Fall
- Black – Black Tortoise of the North (玄武), Winter

The dohyō in training stables is not raised but is otherwise the same as those used in tournaments. One dohyō is standard, although some larger stables have built two.

== Dohyō matsuri ==
After the dohyō has been built, a ceremony called the dohyō matsuri (ring ceremony) is held. The dohyō matsuri is said to have been introduced by Yoshida Zenzaemon sometime during the Edo period. The Yoshida family was a prominent gyōji family.

The ceremony is done to purify and consecrate the dohyō, while also inviting the kami (Shinto deities) down to watch sumo. The ceremony is led by one of the tate-gyōji (head referee) along with two other gyōji. The gyōji take the place of Shinto priests. The tate-gyoji will pray for the safety and well-being of the wrestlers. In the middle of the dohyō a square hole is cut in where the tate-gyoji will then place inside: torreya nuts, dried chestnuts, salt, washed rice, dried squid or cuttlefish and kombu (seaweed). The tate-gyoji will then pour sacred sake into the hole, and around several other places around the dohyō before he will put more clay into the hole. The yobidashi will eventually cover up the hole. The sacred sake is then shared with everyone in attendance.

To conclude the ceremony, the yobidashi in a procession with taiko drums called a fure-daiko will begin. The procession will go around the dohyō three times before leaving the proceeding out into the street to announce the beginning of the tournament.

At the end of the tournament, one gyōji is thrown into the air by the low ranking wrestlers as a way of sending off the kami and officially ending the tournament.

== Women ==
In professional sumo, women are not allowed to enter or touch the dohyō, a tradition stemming from Shinto and Buddhist beliefs that women are "impure" because of menstrual blood. Female sumo does exist on an amateur level.

== Image gallery ==
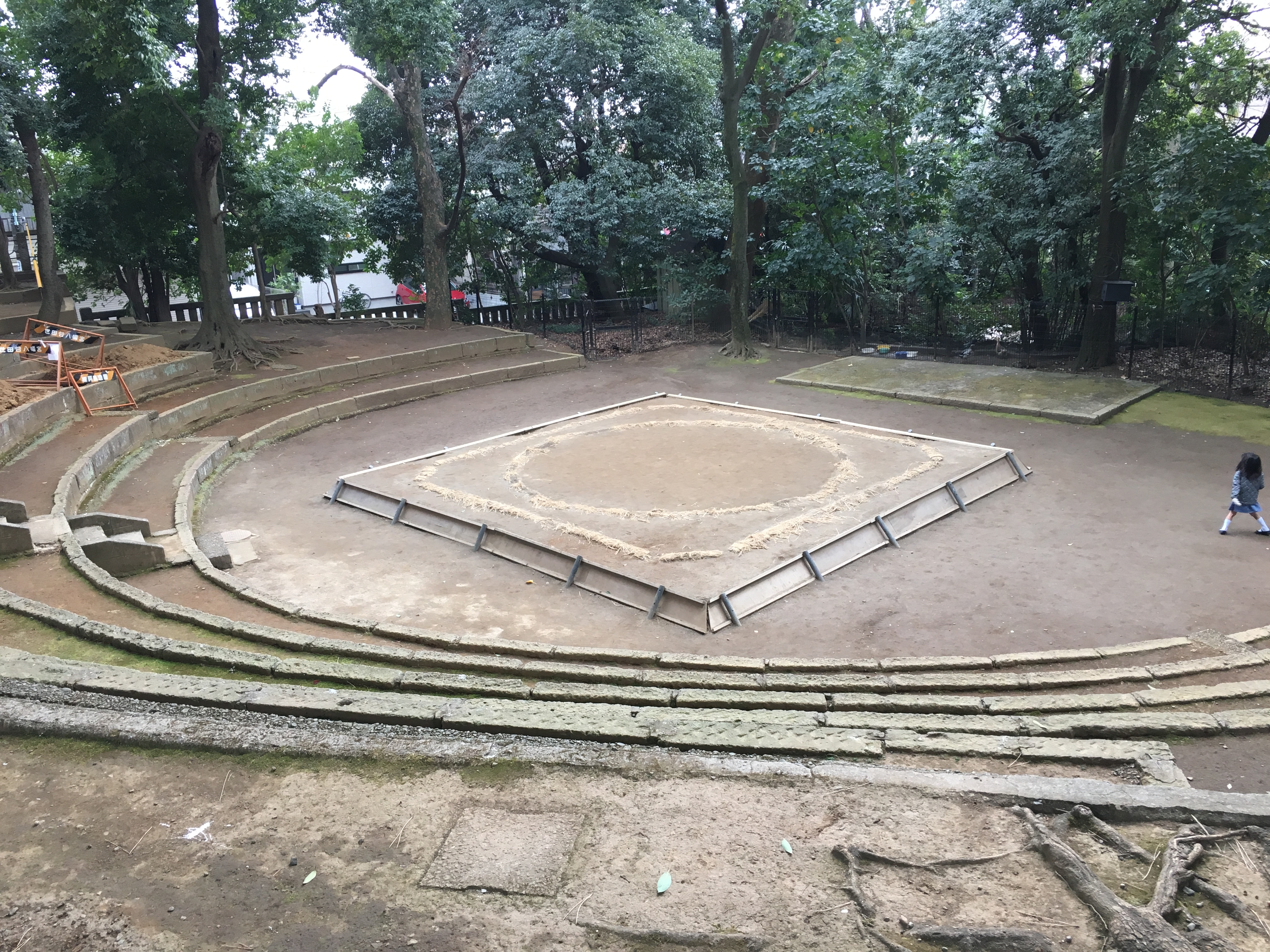
An outdoor dohyō in Setagaya, Tokyo.

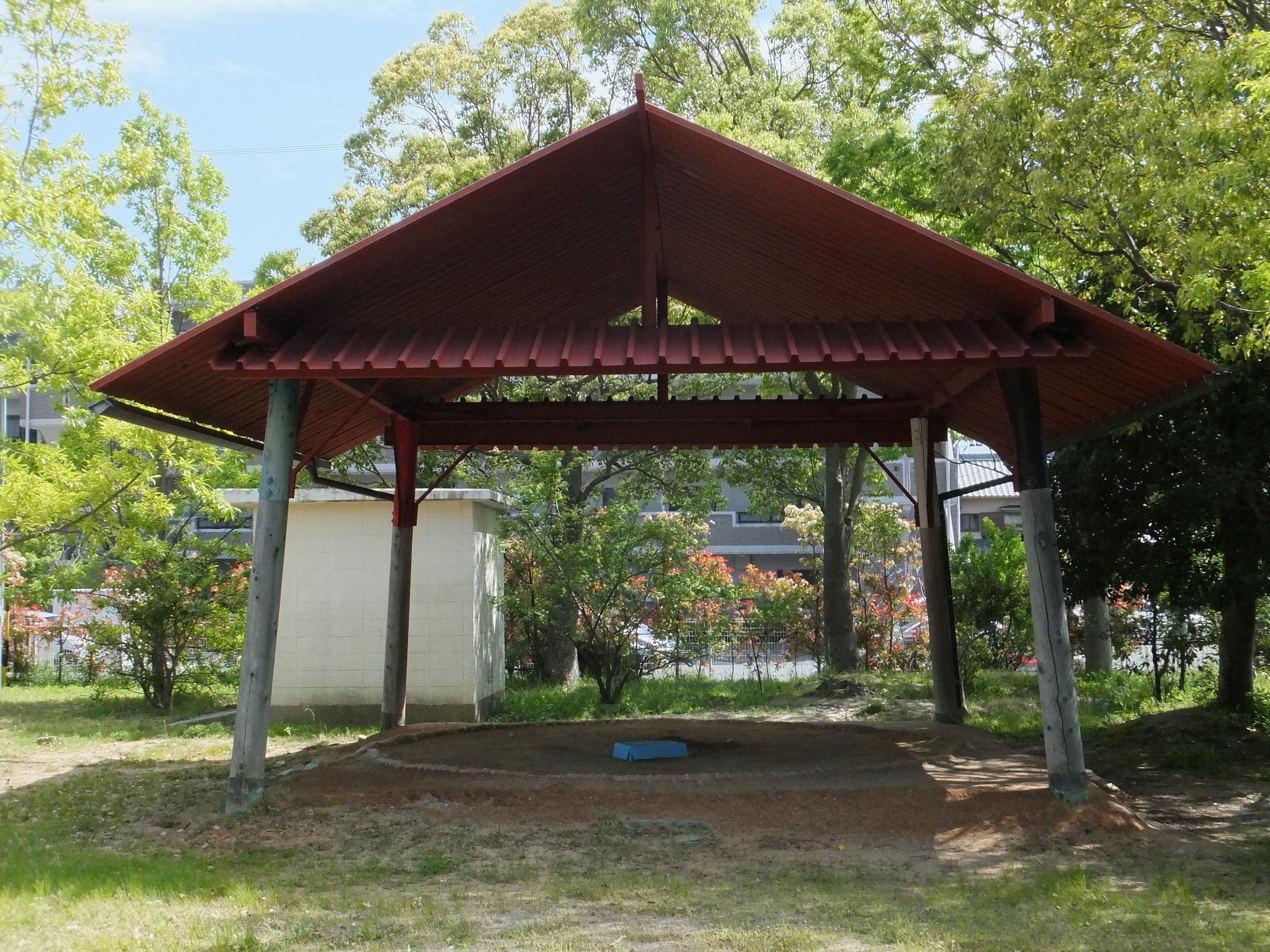
Dohyō at Gamagori Junior High School

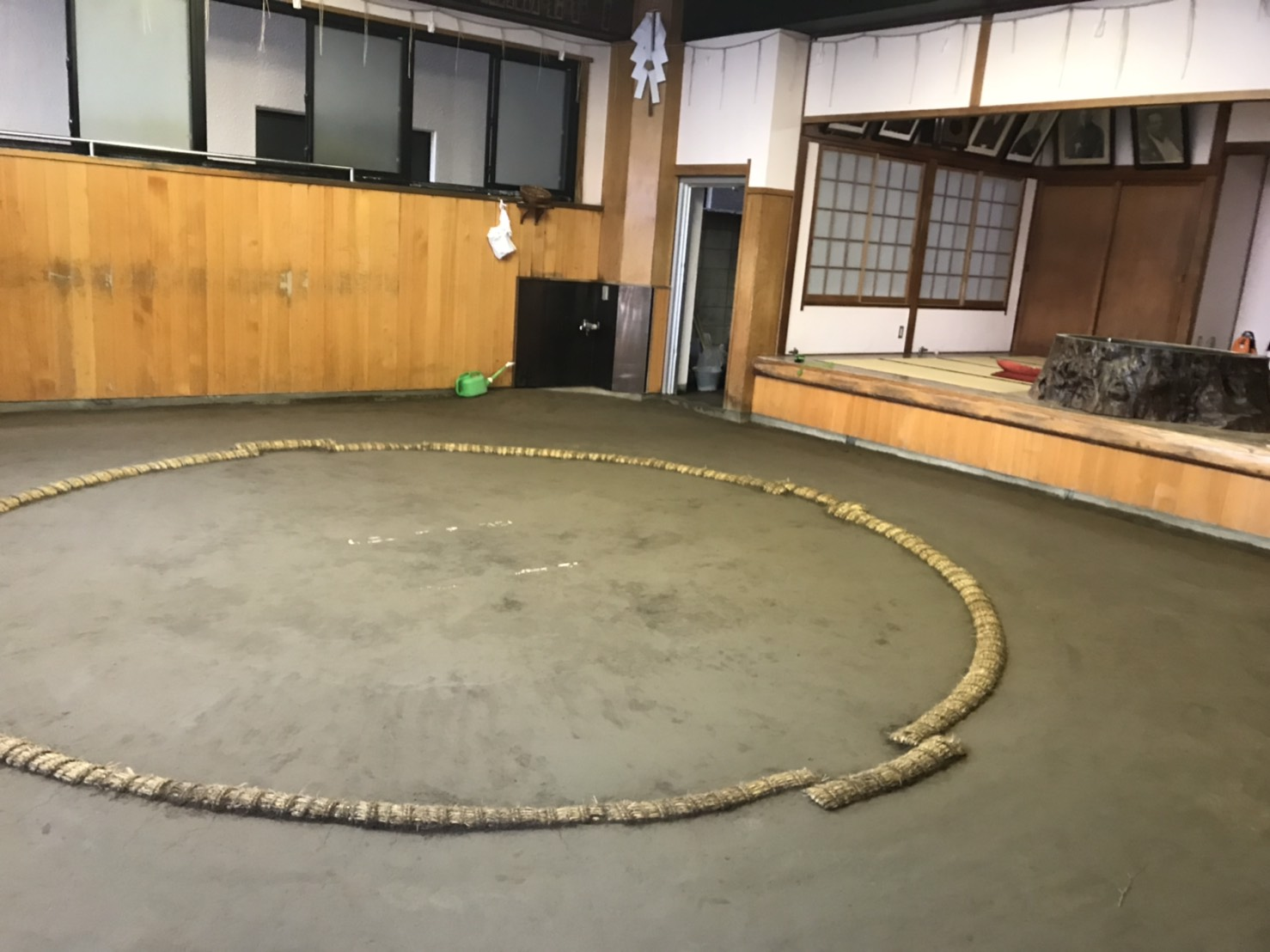
Training dohyō at Dewanoumi stable, note how it is not on a raised platform

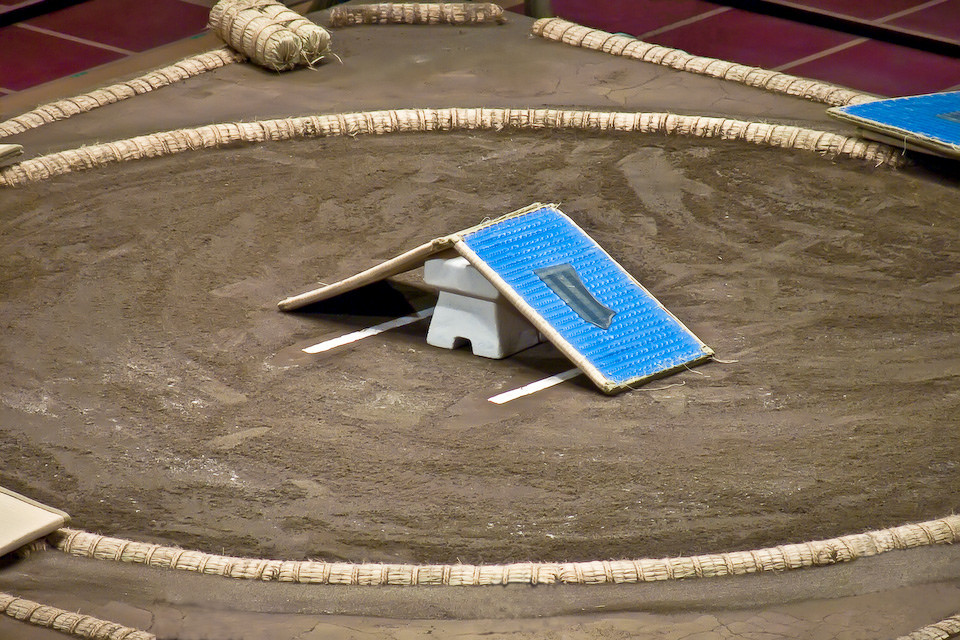
Freshly painted shikiri-sen with a mat covering them to protect against the tarp that will be placed over the dohyō

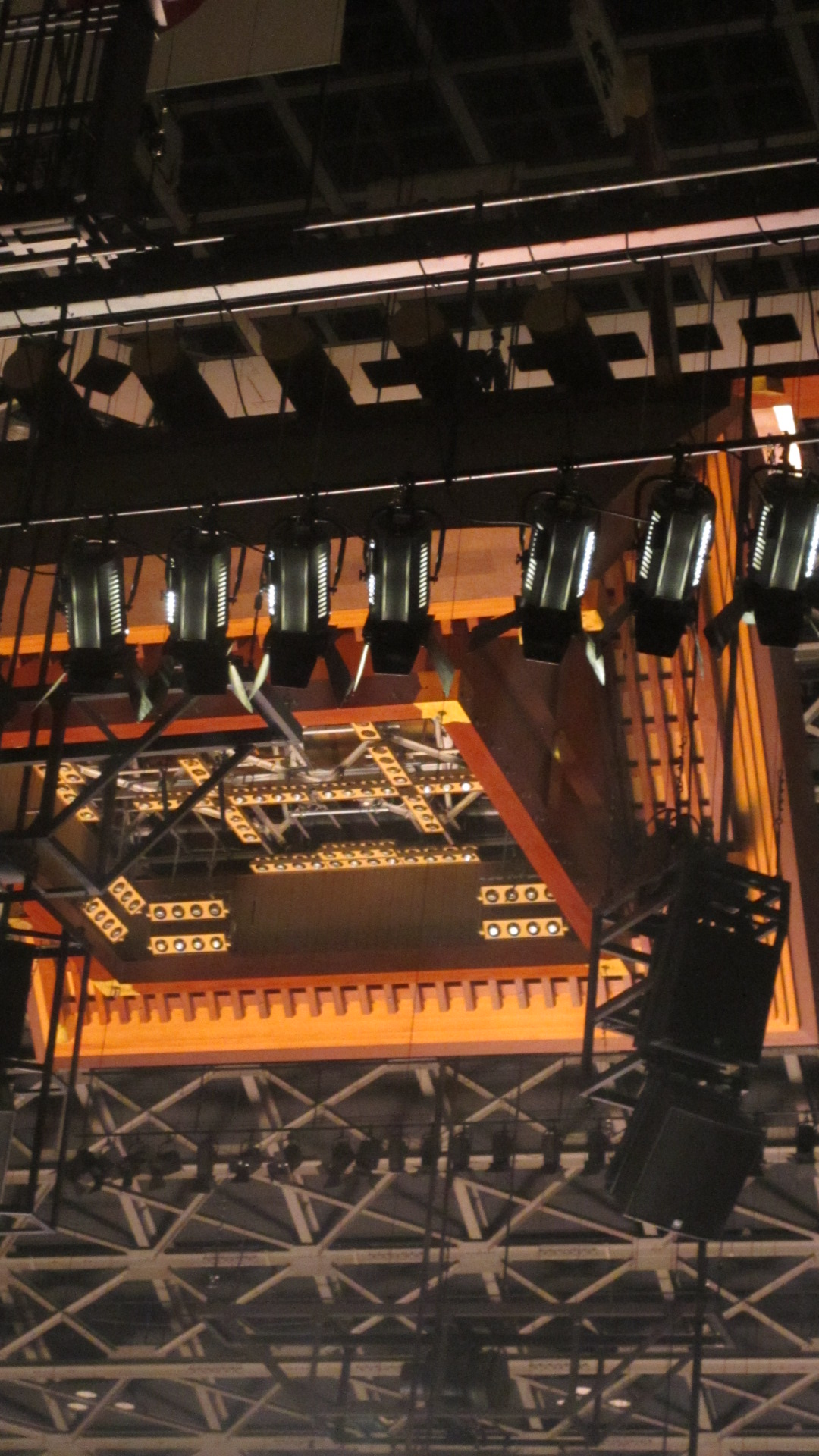
Underside of the suspended roof at the Ryōgoku Kokugikan, note the hidden lights. The roof is usually raised up to the ceiling, and only lowered for sumo matches.

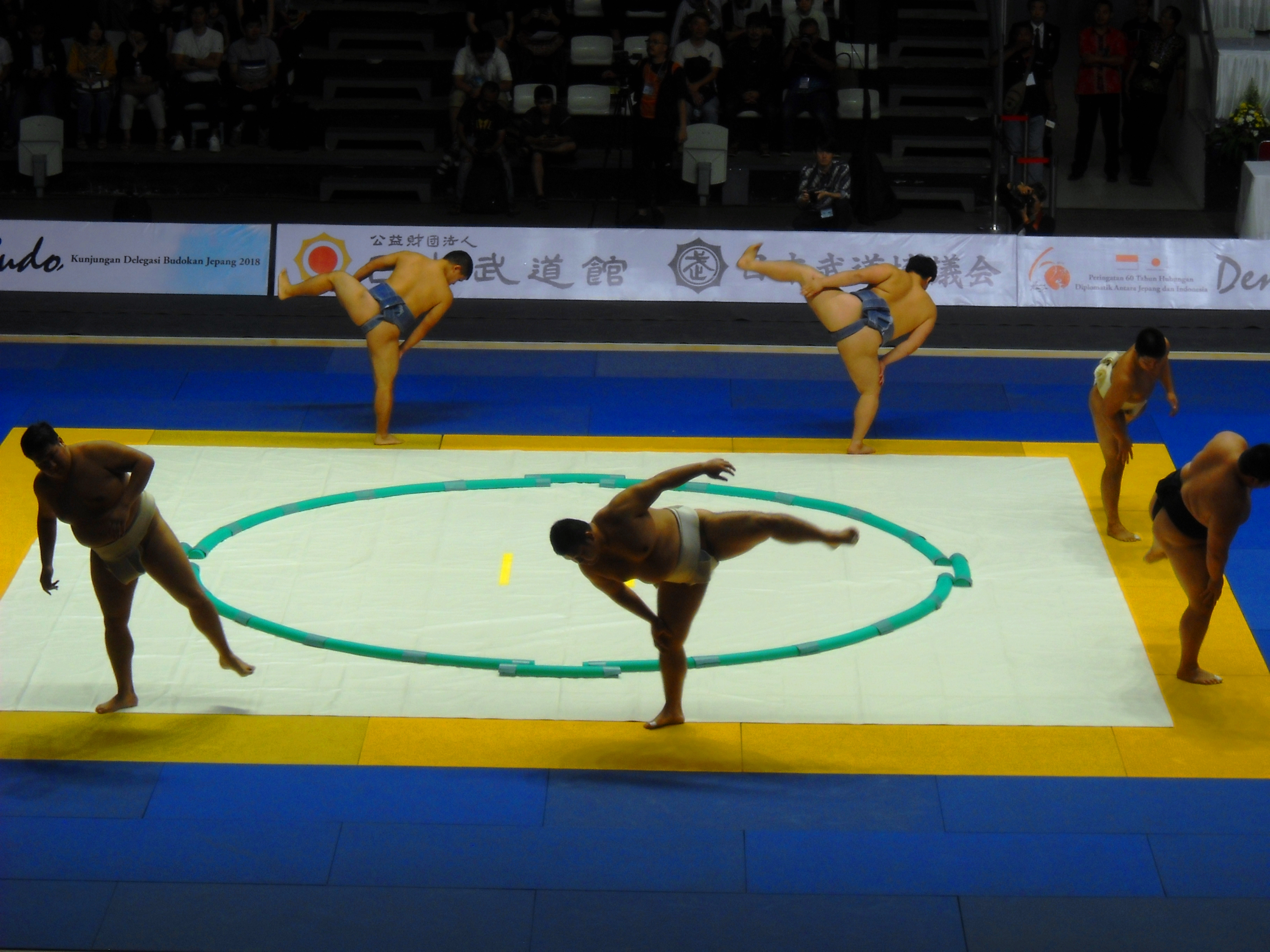
Amateur sumo competitions and training may sometimes use pre-built, portable dohyō made of canvas and foam plastic.

== See also ==
- Dohyō-iri
- Clay court
