= Dodoitsu =

Form of Japanese poetry

Dodoitsu (都々逸) is a form of Japanese poetry developed towards the end of the Edo period. Often concerning love or work, and usually comical, Dodoitsu poems consist of four lines with the moraic structure 7-7-7-5 and no rhyme for a total of 26 morae, distinct from the tanka and haiku forms. The form, tone and structure of Dodoitsu derive from Japanese folk song traditions.

== History ==
Dodoitsu songs were popular in the nineteenth century, when it became easier to publish new verses for a mass market. Dodoitsubō Senka (d. 1852) is especially credited with the development of the form. Some performers known as yomiuri sang comic or sentimental dodoitsu about current events, often with shamisen accompaniment. Lafcadio Hearn (1950–1904) discussed dodoitsu with some English translations in Gleanings in Buddha-Fields (1897). For example:

Kami wa kitté mo
Ni-sé made kiketa
Fukai enishi wa
Kiru mono ka?

Translation:

I have cut my hair for his sake;
But the deeper relation between us
Cannot be cut in this,
Nor yet in another life.

Dodoitsu composition, recitation, and singing was associated with geisha culture in the early 20th century. "There are no geisha that have not tried to master the dodoitsu," explained one journalist in 1914.

More recently, the form is referenced in the manga and anime series Shōwa Genroku Rakugo Shinjū in reference to its historical recitation by dancers in Japanese red-light districts. In Descending Stories: Showa Genroku Rakugo Shinju, Chapter: Yakumo & Sukeroku 1, one character challenges the other to sing a dodoitsu, which he does. The endnotes for the English translation of Descending Stories, Volume 2, state that dodoitsu are "Japanese songlike poetry, usually humorous in nature, about love, work, and life."
