= Asahiyama =

Asahiyama may refer to:

- Mount Asahi (Ishikari), a mountain in Asahikawa, Hokkaidō
- Asahiyama Zoo, a zoo in Asahikawa, Hokkaidō
- Kotonishiki Katsuhiro, also known as Asahiyama, head coach of the sumo stable Asahiyama
- Asahiyama stable, a now defunct sumo wrestling stable
- Asahiyama stable (2016), an unrelated current sumo wrestling stable
