= Yasushi Inoue Memorial Hall =

- 井上靖記念館
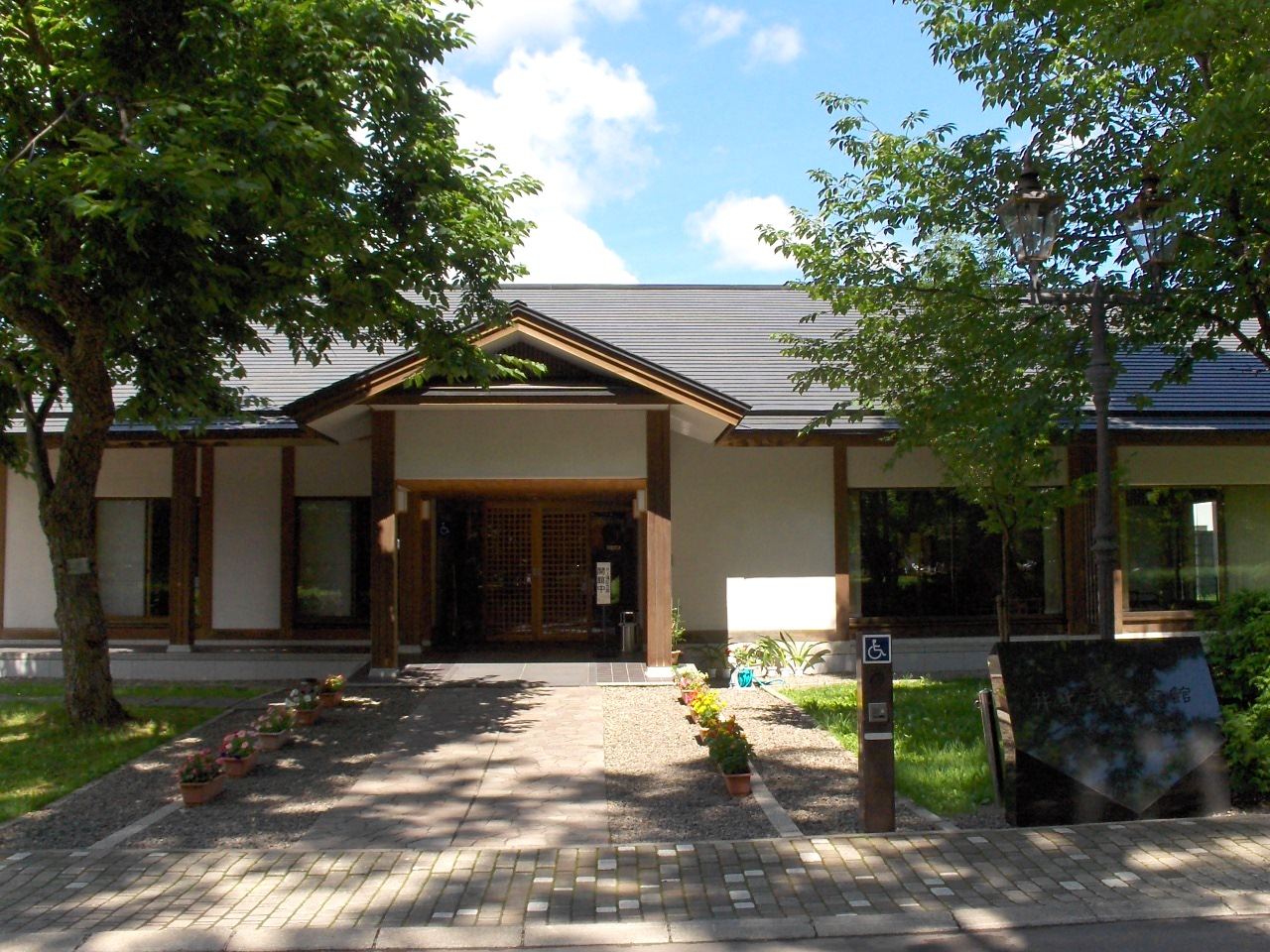

- Location within Hokkaido Location within Japan

General information
- Location: 5-7 Shunkō, Asahikawa, Hokkaidō, Japan
- Coordinates: 43°48′19″N 142°21′49″E
- Opened: 24 July 1993

Website
- Official website

The Yasushi Inoue Memorial Hall (井上靖記念館, Inoue Yasushi Kinenkan) opened in Asahikawa, Hokkaidō, Japan in 1993. Dedicated to author Yasushi Inoue, born in Asahikawa in 1907, the museum displays some five hundred items from its collection of a thousand objects, mostly books. In 2012 the study and reception room from the author's former residence in Setagaya were transferred to the museum.

== See also ==
- Asahikawa Museum of Sculpture
