= The Bullfight (novella) =

1949 Japanese novella

- Author: Yasushi Inoue
- Original title: 闘牛
- Translator: Michael Emmerich
- Language: Japanese
- Genre: Novella
- Publisher: Bungakukai (magazine) Bungeishunjū (book)
- Publication date: 1949, 1950
- Publication place: Japan
- English publication date: 2013
- Media type: Print

The Bullfight (闘牛, Tōgyū) is a Japanese novella by Yasushi Inoue first published in 1949, which won him the prestigious Akutagawa Prize.

== Plot ==
Tsugami, the ambitious editor-in-chief of a small Osaka evening newspaper, is talked by event manager Tashiro into presenting a bull fighting event in the sports stadium of the war-scarred city. At the same time, young widow Sakiko, with whom Tsugami has an extramarital affair, threatens to end their relationship because of his emotional coldness. Tashiro introduces Tsugami to factory owner Okabe, who helps with his various connections to authorities and other businesses, while using the venture for his own black market trades. Businessman Miura, who wants to promote his company's pharmacy products, offers to buy all available tickets with a 20 percent discount, which would secure the financing, but is rejected by Tsugami and his boss Otome. An unexpected rain brings the start of the event to a halt, and only on the third and last day, a modest number of spectators attends the bull fights. For a short moment, Sakiko imagines she can reach out to the temporarily defeated Tsugami, but once he regains his self-confidence, he falls back into his usual detachment.

== Background ==
The story refers to an actual bull fighting event held in Nishinomiya Stadium, Osaka, in January 1947, presented by the evening newspaper Shin-Ōsaka (新大阪). Inoue had attended the event and decided to use it for a fictitious work. He told Masakazu Kotani, organiser and then editor-in-chief of the Shin-Ōsaka, of his plan, who agreed to provide Inoue with detailed information on the venture.

== Themes ==
Critics have read The Bullfight as an allegory of post-war Japan: the ruined city of Osaka and its black-market opportunists form the backdrop against which Tsugami's gamble unfolds. The organising of the bullfight has been described as an existential struggle for Tsugami, a test of will in a world stripped of larger purpose, and the novel has been noted for its spare, minimalist prose style.

== Publication history ==
The Bullfight first appeared in the December 1949 edition of Bungakukai magazine. The novella received the prestigious Akutagawa Prize the following year, where it also saw its first publication in book form. The Bullfight has been cited by critics and Inoue himself as the work which, together with the preceding The Hunting Gun, launched his career as a writer.

== Translations ==
The Bullfight was first translated into English by Michael Emmerich in 2013.

== Reception ==
Reviewing the 2013 English translation, David Evans of The Independent called it a "superb" work, while Eileen Battersby of The Irish Times praised its "intense, brilliantly paced narrative."
