= Mount Asahi =

Mount Asahi can refer to:

- Asahidake, the tallest mountain of Hokkaidō
- Mount Asahi (Ishikari), a hill outside Asahikawa, Hokkaidō
- Mount Asahi (Yamagata)
