= Shimoyama incident =

Unsolved mystery involving train wreck in Tokyo, Japan

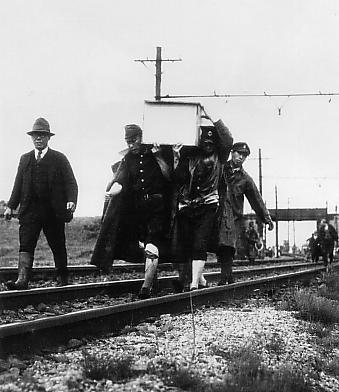
- Removal of Shimoyama's remains from the Jōban Line.
- Native name: 下山事件
- Date: July 5–6, 1949
- Time: 8:20 - 01:00 (Japan DST (UTC+8))
- Location: Mitsukoshi main branch, Chūō, Tokyo, Japan (last seen alive) Nihonbashi, JNR Jōban Line, between Kita-Senju and Ayase Stations (body found)
- Cause: Unknown (Disputed)
- Motive: Unknown (Disputed)
- Perpetrator: Unknown (Disputed)
- Outcome: Shimoyama is found deceased on the 6th after having been run over by a train
- Deaths: 1 (Sadanori Shimoyama)

The Shimoyama incident (下山事件, Shimoyama jiken) was the disappearance and death of Sadanori Shimoyama, the first president of Japanese National Railways (JNR), in Tokyo, Japan, on 5 July 1949. The following day, his body was discovered on the Jōban Line in Adachi.

Immediately following the discovery, there was public debate over whether Shimoyama had been murdered or committed suicide. Despite pressure from the Japanese government and Allied command, the Tokyo Metropolitan Police initially investigated the death as a suicide through the First Investigation Division. Continued pressure caused the suicide investigation to be ended, and a homicide investigation was opened by the Second Investigation Division. Police ultimately terminated the investigation without announcing any results, and the statute of limitations for prosecution of a murder expired in July 1964, fifteen years after Shimoyama's death.

The Shimoyama incident, the Mitaka incident, and the Matsukawa derailment occurred within two months of each other and together are known as "JNR's Three Big Mysteries".

== Background ==
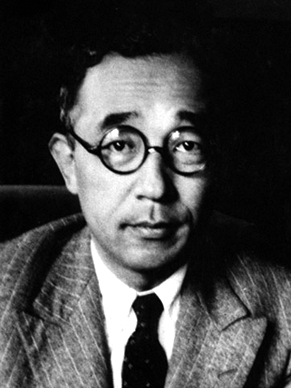
Sadanori Shimoyama

Sadanori Shimoyama (下山 定則, Shimoyama Sadanori; born 23 July 1901) was a bureaucrat in the Ministry of Transport, the successor to the Ministry of Railways which had operated Japan's railway network. Shimoyama was appointed the first president of Japanese National Railways (JNR) when it was established on 1 June 1949. Under the Dodge Line policy of the Japanese government, Shimoyama was responsible for drastic personnel cutbacks of JNR, as a part of which on 4 July 1949 he released a list of about 30,000 employees to be fired.

== Disappearance ==
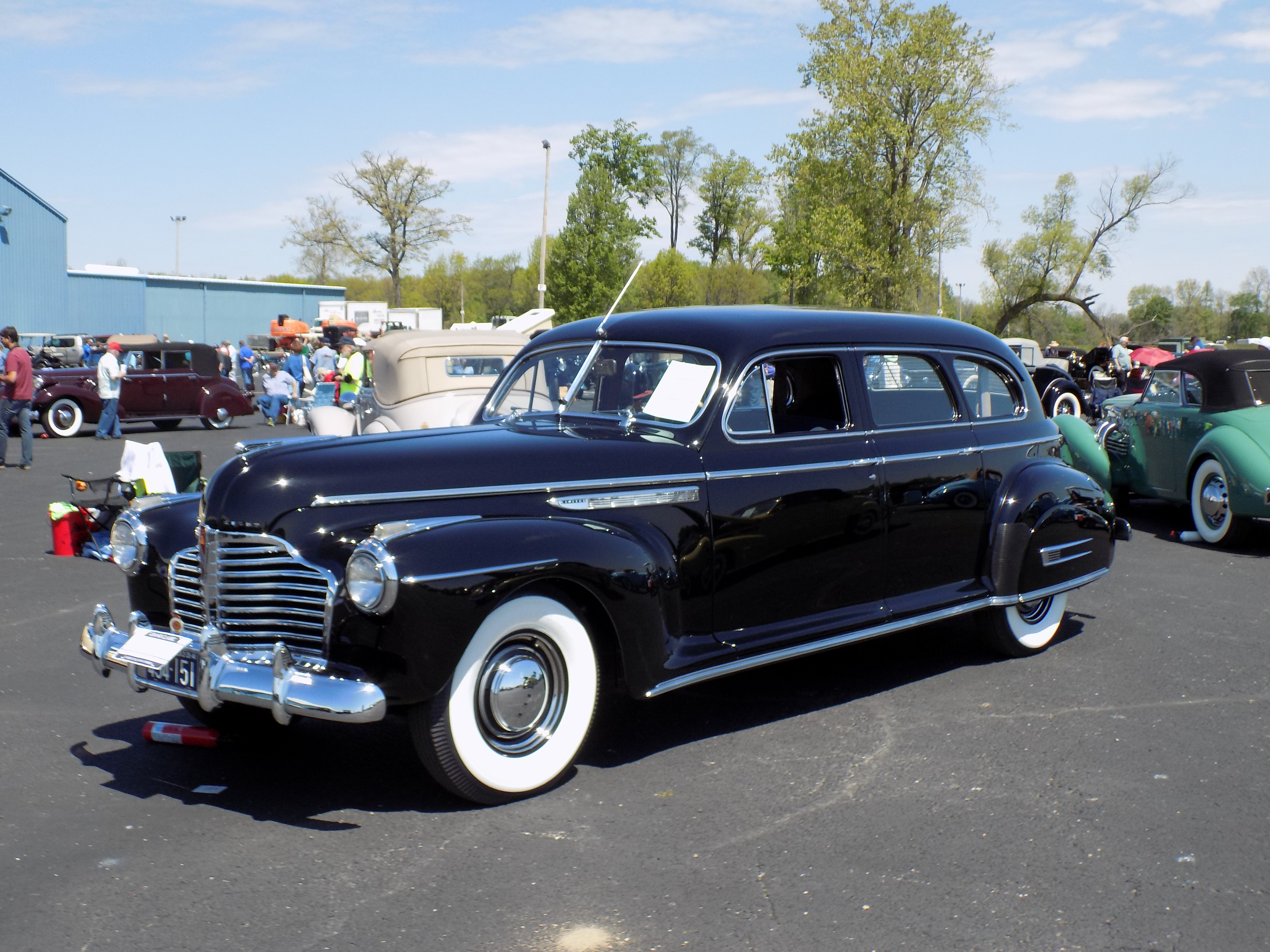
A 1941 Buick similar to the one Shimoyama rode in on the day of his disappearance

On the morning of the next day, 5 July, Shimoyama left his home in Ōta, Tokyo around 8:20 in his 1941 Buick. On his way to work, he instructed the driver to stop at the Mitsukoshi Department Store in Nihonbashi. Having arrived at the store before its opening, they returned to a Chiyoda Bank office (now The Bank of Tokyo-Mitsubishi UFJ) in front of Tokyo Station. They then followed a circuitous route back to the Mitsukoshi store. Around 9:37 AM, Shimoyama again got out of the official car, telling the driver to wait for five minutes, and quickly entered the Mitsukoshi. This was the last he was heard from.

Normally, Shimoyama arrived at JNR headquarters before 9 AM and was greeted by his secretary. On the day of his disappearance, in the tense atmosphere of impending personnel cutbacks, there was an important meeting scheduled at 9 AM. His failure to arrive, after confirming from home that he would be there, caused a great stir at JNR headquarters, and the police were contacted. The investigation began as a missing persons case. On 6 July, past 12:30 AM, Shimoyama's dismembered body was found on the Jōban Line between Kita-Senju Station and Ayase Station in Adachi. Shimoyama had been hit by a train.

After the disappearance, an individual fitting Shimoyama's description was reported seen first in the Mitsukoshi department store in Nihonbashi, then riding on a Ginza Line subway train bound for Asakusa Station. In the Mitsukoshi store, many people reported having seen him.

After 1:40 PM, the individual spoke with a station attendant at Tobu Railway's Gotanno Station in Adachi, close to where the body was discovered. Following that, from 2 PM until some time past 5 PM, he stopped at Matsuhiro Ryokan, close to the station. There were many reports of a man with Shimoyama's height and clothing walking south along the Tōbu Isesaki Line from 6 PM until after 8 PM from Gotanno toward the spot in which the body was found.

== Investigation ==
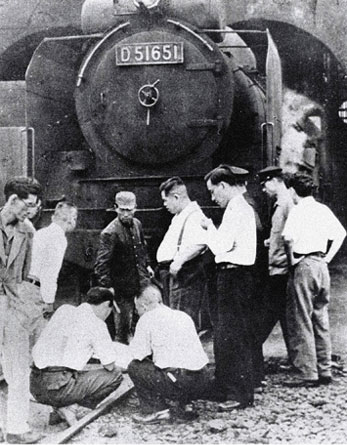
Inspection of locomotive D51 651, which hit Shimoyama

Found on the outbound track of the Jōban Line, it was determined that Shimoyama's body had been dismembered around 20 minutes after midnight by outbound freight train No. 869, pulled by locomotive D51 651. The official autopsy was led by Tanemoto Furuhata, a Tokyo University professor of forensic medicine, with the autopsy itself being performed by Furuhata's colleague Naoki Kuwashima. Based on the injuries to the body, it was determined that Shimoyama died prior to being hit by the train.

A specific cause of death was not established, but blood loss (at another location) was possible, due to the lack of blood found in the body and at the scene. Additionally, in some parts of the body life-threatening internal bleeding was found which could only have been caused by considerable force, such as kicking. On the other hand, a Tokyo municipal coroner who had examined the body at the scene believed that Shimoyama's death was suicide. However, the internal bleeding observed in the remains of Shimoyama was also consistent with being hit by a train, and investigators would not have been able to observe blood at the scene because it was raining. As such, these facts were not seen as useful to support a conclusion of murder.

Keio University professor Nakadate Kyūhei believed that Shimoyama was alive when hit by the train, although he never saw the body. These theories stand in opposition to one another. On 30 August 1949, Furuhata, Nakadate, and Kyōsuke Komiya of Nagoya Medical School were called to testify before the Committee on Judicial Affairs of the Diet's House of Representatives, and in doing so brought the Diet and the world of forensic medicine into the controversy. In response to the committee's questions, Furuhata stated that "Kuwashima still cannot officially declare this a murder or suicide. He has stated only that the body was dismembered after death. The investigation is still underway, and those who know nothing of it but make deductions anyway are unscientific and taking liberties."

== In art and media ==
- Seichō Matsumoto - Black Fog over Japan.
- Inoue Yasushi's first full-length novel, Kuroi Ushio, follows a journalist reporting on the case.
- The character of Noriyuki Shimokawa in Osamu Tezuka's manga Ayako is modeled on Sadanori Shimoyama.
- The Shimoyama incident is one of the central mysteries in Naoki Urasawa and Takashi Nagasaki's manga Billy Bat.
- The Shimoyama incident is the subject of David Peace's novel Tokyo Redux.
- Willful Murder (1981), directed by Kei Kumai, dramatizes a journalist's investigation into the Shimoyama incident.

== See also ==
- List of unsolved murders (1900–1979)
- List of unsolved deaths
- Lists of solved missing person cases
