= Ayako Miura =

Japanese writer

- 三浦綾子
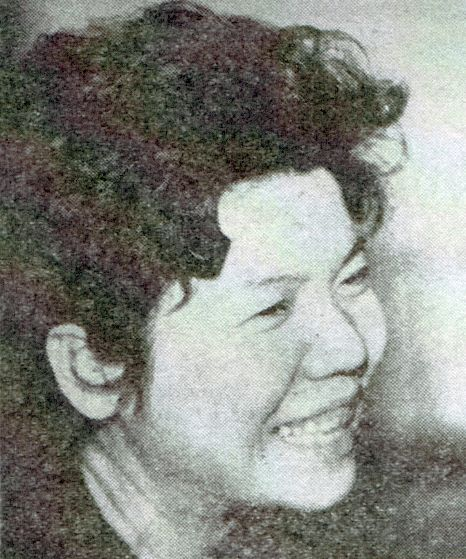
- Ayako Miura in 1966
- Born: 25 April 1922; Asahikawa, Hokkaido, Empire of Japan
- Died: 12 October 1999 (aged 77)
- Citizenship: Japanese
- Occupation: Novelist
- Spouse: Miura Mitsuyo

Ayako Miura (三浦綾子, Miura Ayako; 25 April 1922 – 12 October 1999) was a Japanese novelist. She published over eighty works of both fiction and non-fiction. Many of her works are considered best-sellers, and a number have been remade as feature-length films.

Her debut novel, Hyōten (氷点, "Freezing Point"), was published in 1964, and won the Asahi Shimbun's Ten Million Yen Award that same year.

== Profile ==
Miura Ayako (née Hotta Ayako) was born in the town of Asahikawa, on Hokkaidō, the northernmost of Japan's main islands. She remained there for the rest of her life, even after becoming a best-selling writer, in spite of pressure to move to Tokyo, the center of Japan's publishing world. Asahikawa and Hokkaidō are frequently the settings of her novels, and this is part of what characterizes her writing. The influence of the Bible is also a major element in her works. Japanese scholars have compared her writing to that of Natsume Sōseki and Dazai Osamu, authors whose works had left a deep impression on her in her youth (Miura 1982). Her family was large and not very well-off financially, but they always managed to be clothed and fed. Ayako was a voracious reader as a child, borrowing Japanese classics and translated Western classics wherever she could find them. She became an elementary school teacher when she was seventeen. This was during World War II, and she faithfully carried out the educational policies of the wartime government without the smallest of doubts.

Ayako left the teaching profession upon Japan's defeat in World War II, when she became convinced that her own confusion regarding right, wrong, truth and deception disqualified her from teaching children anything of value. Soon afterwards, she contracted tuberculosis, then caries of the spine (tuberculous spondylitis), which confined her to bed for thirteen years, seven of them in a body cast that restricted all movement. She became a confirmed Nihilist until she was converted to the (Protestant) Christian faith. She was baptised in 1952 and, soon thereafter, married Miura Mitsuyo. This marriage was to have a profound influence on her success as a novelist and essayist. Her life before her writing career began is described in the first volume of her autobiography Michi Ariki (1970), which was published in English translation under the title of The Wind is Howling (InterVarsity Press, 1977).

The themes she explores in her novels are primarily Biblical themes: human depravity and egoism on the one hand, and sacrifice and forgiveness of sin on the other. Her novel, Shiokari Pass, became a 1973 film that was later titled Love Stopped the Runaway Train directed by Noboru Nakamura. She is often compared and contrasted with the Japanese Catholic novelist Endo Shusaku, who lived around the same time.

== English translations ==
Miura novels that have been translated into English include the following:

- Hyōten (Asahi Shinbunsha, 1965). Translated into English as Freezing Point (Dawn Press, 1986).
- Shiokari Tōge (Shinchôsha, 1968). Translated into English as Shiokari Pass (OMF Press, 1974).
- Yuki no Arubamu (Shôgakkan, 1986). Translated into English as A Heart of Winter (OMF Press, 1991).
- Kairei (Asahi Shinbunsha, 1981). Translated into English as Hidden Ranges (Dawn Press, 1993).
- Hosokawa Garasha Fujin (Shufunotomosha, 1975). Translated into English as Lady Gracia (IBC Publishing, 2004).
- Michi Ariki (Shufunotomosha, 1969). Translated into English as The Wind is Howling (Intervarsity Press, 1977)
