= Kuroi Ushio =

1950 Japanese novel

- Author: Yasushi Inoue
- Original title: 黯い潮
- Language: Japanese
- Publisher: Bungei Shunjū (magazine); Kadokawa Bunko (book)
- Publication date: 1950, 1952
- Publication place: Japan
- Media type: Print

Kuroi Ushio (黯い潮; lit. Black Tide) is the first full-length novel by Japanese writer Yasushi Inoue, set against the background of the 1949 Shimoyama incident. It first appeared in serialised form in the literary magazine Bungei Shunjū in 1950 and later in book form in 1952.

== Plot ==
After the violent death of Sadanori Shimoyama, president of the Japanese National Railways, journalist Hayami, who works for the fictitious newspaper "K", is entrusted with the task of managing the coverage of the case. While rivaling newspapers advocate a murder theory, Hayami, who resents sensationalism, interprets the evidence and unofficial statements by police officers as suicide, for which he faces criticism by superiors and readers. During the investigations, Hayami thinks back to the death of his young wife Harumi 16 years ago, who committed suicide with another man, leaving behind no explanatory letter but only a short message telling him that she loves him. He also has repeated meetings with his former art teacher Usan, who wants him to help publish a book on ancient cloth colouring techniques. Usan offers him his daughter Keiko, who appears to be interested in Hayami, as a wife. The Shimoyama case eventually remains unsolved, and Hayami decides against the prospect of marrying Keiko.

== Background ==
At the time of Shimoyama's death, Inoue was working for the Mainichi Shimbun newspaper, which favoured a suicide theory, while the Asahi Shimbun advocated the theory that Shimoyama had been murdered. The case was closed by the police without announcing a definite cause of death.

== Legacy ==
Kuroi Ushio is regarded as one of Inoue's best-known works, which "encouraged the vogue of novelistic treatment of contemporary social and political events".

Inoue's novel has not seen an English translation and publication yet. A translation into German appeared in 1980.

== Adaptation ==
Kuroi Ushio was adapted into a film of the same name in 1954, directed by and starring Sō Yamamura.

== Bibliography ==
- Inoue, Yasushi (1952). 黯い潮 (Kuroi Ushio). Tokyo: Kadokawa Bunko.
- Inoue, Yasushi (1979). 黯い潮・霧の道 (Kuroi Ushio / Kiri no michi). Tokyo: Bungeishunjū.
- Inoue, Yasushi (1980). Schwarze Flut (Kuroi Ushio) (in German). Frankfurt: Suhrkamp.
