= Life of a Counterfeiter =

1951 Japanese novella

- 2014 edition
- Author: Yasushi Inoue
- Original title: ある偽作家の生涯
- Translator: Leon Picon (1965); Michael Emmerich (2015)
- Language: Japanese
- Publisher: Shinchō (magazine); Sōgensha (book)
- Publication date: 1951
- Publication place: Japan
- English publication date: 1965, 2014
- Media type: Print

Life of a Counterfeiter (ある偽作家の生涯, Aru gisakka no shōgai; lit. "The life of a fake artist"), also translated as The Counterfeiter, is a Japanese novella by Yasushi Inoue first published in 1951.

== Plot ==
In early 1951, an art journalist receives an invitation for the 13th death anniversary of famous painter Keigaku Ōnuki. He remembers the assignment he received from Keigaku's relatives to write a biography on the artist 9 years ago, and decides to finally finish the project, which had come to a halt during the early post-war years. While studying Keigaku's diaries, he repeatedly reads of a friend by the name of Shinozaki, finally realising that Shinozaki is no other but Keigaku's former friend Hōsen Hara, who successfully copied Keigaku's art and sold it as originals.

The journalist recollects memories going back to 1943, when he met private owners of Keigaku's paintings and was repeatedly confronted with Hara's technically adept copies, and to 1945 and 1947, when he stayed in the village in Chūgoku Mountains, where Hara lived during his last years. Abandoned by his wife, Hara illegally experimented with gunpowder to create a firework of the colour of red chrysanthemums. The journalist contemplates on the fate of a man who, overshadowed by a famous artist friend, never received recognition for his own talent and faded into obscurity.

== Publication history ==
Life of a Counterfeiter first appeared in the October 1951 edition of Shinchō magazine and was published in book form by Sōgensha the same year.

== Reception ==
When published in 2015 in a new English translation, Eileen Battersby of The Irish Times saw in Life of a Counterfeiter "one of Inoue’s strongest stories", and the reviewer of Publishers Weekly a "masterly meditation on fate and obscurity".

== Translations ==
Life of a Counterfeiter was published in English in 1965, translated by Leon Picon, and in 2015, translated by Michael Emmerich.

== Bibliography ==
- Inoue, Yasushi (1951). ある偽作家の生涯 (Life of a Counterfeiter). Osaka: Sōgensha.
- Inoue, Yasushi (1965). The Counterfeiter and Other Stories. Translated by Picon, Leon. Rutland and Tokyo: Charles E. Tuttle Co.
- Inoue, Yasushi (2014). Life of a Counterfeiter. Translated by Emmerich, Michael. London: Pushkin Press. ISBN 978-1-78227-002-7.
