= Miho Yabe =

Japanese model and J-pop idol singer (born 1987)

- Born: 7 June 1977 (age 49); Asahikawa, Hokkaido, Japan
- Genres: J-pop
- Occupations: Singer and model
- Years active: 1992-present

Miho Yabe (矢部 美穂, Yabe Miho; born 7 June 1977) is a Japanese model and J-pop idol singer. She was born in Asahikawa, Hokkaido, Japan (raised in Eniwa, Hokkaido), and made her singing debut on January 10, 1996. She has a sister Mika who is also a model, under the stage name Mika Kawai. Her husband is Nobuhiko Sanrindo.

== Discography ==
=== Singles ===
1. 21 August 1996 SHYABON Dama
2. 21 November 1996 SURIRU

=== Albums ===
1. 21 September 1996 Variety Kids

== Filmography ==
=== Television ===
- Bengoshi no Kuzu (2006)

=== Film ===
- Beautiful Lure (2021)

== Picture books ==
1. PYU
2. Final Beauty Yabe Miho
3. Loose
