= Hunting Rifle =

1961 Japanese film

- Film poster
- Directed by: Heinosuke Gosho
- Written by: Toshio Yasumi; Yasushi Inoue (novella)
- Produced by: Hiroshi Sano; Sennosuke Tsukimori
- Starring: Fujiko Yamamoto; Haruko Wanibuchi; Mariko Okada; Keiji Sada; Shin Saburi
- Cinematography: Haruo Takeno
- Music by: Yasushi Akutagawa
- Distributed by: Shochiku
- Release date: 3 January 1961 (Japan)
- Running time: 98 minutes
- Country: Japan
- Language: Japanese

Hunting Rifle (Japanese: 猟銃, romanized: Ryōju) is a 1961 Japanese drama film directed by Heinosuke Gosho. It is based on the 1949 novella of the same name by Yasushi Inoue.

== Plot ==
In a short prologue, a hunter armed with a double-barreled gun, accompanied only by his dog, walks through a snowy landscape, while a narrator describes his appearance. The film then switches to a flashback which takes up the rest of the film.

Misugi, the hunter of the opening sequence, and a company director and art collector, is newly married to the much younger and inexperienced Midori. Midori's older cousin Saiko has been married for a few years to successful physician Kadota. One day, a woman named Hamako shows up with her young child in Saiko's house, claiming that she is Kadota's former mistress and the child his extramarital daughter Shoko. When Hamako dies in an accident shortly after, Saiko agrees to adopt Shoko, but divorces her husband. Saiko visits Midori, making a great impression on Misugi with her sophistication and education. Misugi falls in love with her, and soon the two start a passionate affair. Saiko feels guilty for her betrayal of her younger cousin, referring to Misugi and herself as "criminals" and vowing that she will kill herself if Midori ever found out. Unknown to her, Midori finds out about the adultery but decides to keep calm about her discovery. She has short affairs with other men while her marriage with Misugi deteriorates into coldness and loneliness. Years later, during a visit to the ill Saiko, Midori finally tells her that she knows all about her and Misugi's affair. Saiko, who also learned that her former husband Kadota has married again, asks Shoko to burn her diary for her and commits suicide with poison. Instead of destroying it as told, Shoko reads her mother's diary, shocked about its content, lamenting the "sad and terrible world of adults". The film closes with the prologue's image of Misugi in the snowy landscape.

== Cast ==
- Shin Saburi as Misugi
- Mariko Okada as Midori, his wife
- Fujiko Yamamoto as Saiko, Midori's cousin
- Keiji Sada as Kadota, Saiko's husband
- Haruko Wanibuchi as Shoko, Saiko's adopted daughter
- Nobuko Otowa as Hamako, Shoko's mother
- Eijirō Yanagi as Uncle
- Yoshie Minami as Mrs. Takagi
- Masami Taura as Tsumura
- Toshiko Yabuki as Sadayo

== Literary source ==
Other than the film, Inoue's book works with a nonlinear narrative structure. In a prologue, a nameless poet, after publishing a poem depicting a lonely hunter whose sight impressed him, is contacted by Misugi who recognised himself as the described hunter. Misugi sends him three letters, one by his niece Shoko, the second by his wife Midori, and the third by his lover Saiko. These letters take up the major part of the book, with each woman describing the events from a different perspective, a technique similar to Akira Kurosawa's 1950 film Rashomon. In a short epilogue, the poet reflects on Misugi's character.

While staying mostly close to the original story, Gosho and his scenarist Toshio Yasumi transferred the events, taking place between the mid 1930s and late 1940s in the book, completely into the post-war era for the film. Also, the character of Shoko, Saiko's natural daughter in Inoue's story, is instead presented as the daughter of Kadota's mistress, later adopted by Saiko.

== Legacy ==
Hunting Rifle was screened at the Museum of Modern Art in 2022 as part of its "Beyond Ozu: Hidden Gems of Shochiku Studios" retrospective.
