= Hyōheki =

1956 Japanese novel

- Author: Yasushi Inoue
- Original title: 氷壁
- Language: Japanese
- Publisher: Asahi Shimbun (magazine); Shinchosha (book)
- Publication date: 1956–57
- Publication place: Japan
- Media type: Print

Hyōheki (Japanese: 氷壁; lit. "Wall of ice") is a 1956 Japanese novel by Yasushi Inoue. It was awarded the prize of the Japan Art Academy in 1959.

== Plot ==
Uozu and Kosaka, friends and mountaineers since their student days, plan to climb Mount Hotaka during the New Year's holidays. A few days before the start of their venture, Uozu learns of Kosaka's affair with Minako Yashiro, the young wife of much older engineer Kyonosuke Yashiro. Minako tells Uozu that she regards the affair as finished, which Kosaka is unwilling to accept. Shortly after, during their mountain trip, Kosaka falls to his death due to the tearing of their nylon rope. Upon his return, Uozu is confronted with speculations that Kosaka either died of carelessness, deliberately damaged the rope to commit suicide, or that Uozu had cut the rope to save himself. The rope's manufacturer, a shareholder of Uozu's employer, instructs none other than Kyonosuke Yashiro, whose company supplied the nylon used in the rope, to conduct an experiment under similar, simulated conditions. As the results seem to prove the rope's stability, Uozu's assertions are put to question. Among the few people who are giving him his support are Minako Yashiro, with whom he has become infatuated, his superior Tokiwa, and Kosaka's younger sister Kaoru.

When Kosaka's body is eventually found months later, and the piece of rope found with him seems to support Uozu's version of the accident, the newspapers have lost interest in the case. Minako confesses to Uozu that she shares his feelings for her, but he announces to sever all contact with her, finding the constellation impossible. During his next mountain trip, which Uozu goes about alone under hazardous conditions, he is killed by falling rocks, leading to speculations that he secretly wanted to commit suicide. Kaoru, whom Uozu had promised to marry, vows to take his and Kosaka's ice axes up Mount Hotaka and place them there in the friends' memory, as described in a poem by French mountaineer Roger Duplat which Kosaka had loved.

== Background and publication history ==
Inoue's novel, which was based on a true mountaineering accident that took place at Takidani mountain (part of the Chūgoku mountain range) in 1955, was serialised in the Asahi Shimbun between November 1956 and August 1957. A publication in book form followed in October 1957 and became a best seller.

== Translations ==
Hyōheki has not been translated into English. A translation into German appeared in 1968, a translation into French in 1998.

== Adaptations ==
The novel was adapted into a feature film in 1958, written by Kaneto Shindō and directed by Yasuzō Masumura. It was also adapted for Japanese television numerous times.
