= Minami-Nagayama Station =

Railway station in Asahikawa, Hokkaido, Japan

Coordinates: 43°46′50″N 142°24′31″E

Minami-Nagayama Station 南永山駅
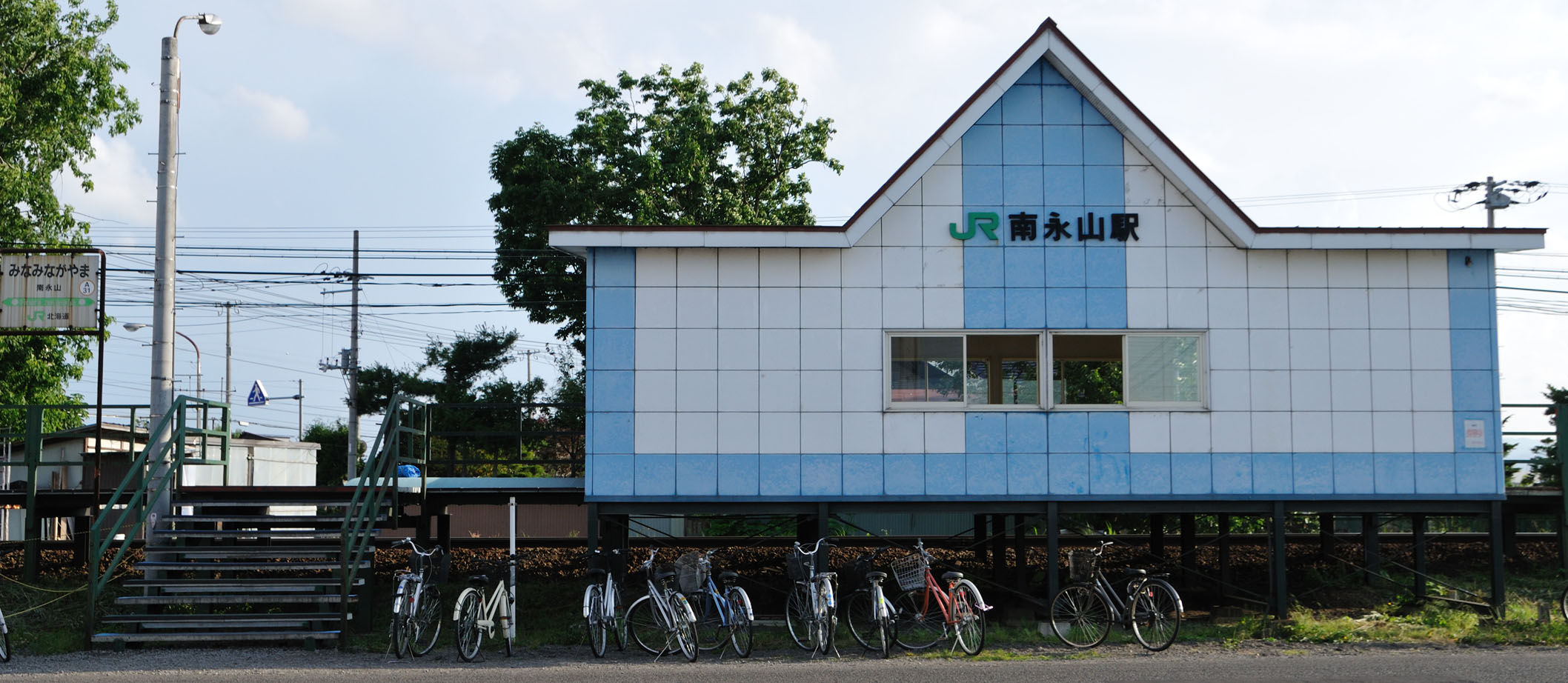

General information
- Location: Asahikawa, Hokkaido; Japan
- Operator: JR Hokkaido
- Line: Sekihoku Main Line

Other information
- Station code: A31

History
- Opened: 1986
Location

Minami-Nagayama Station (南永山駅, Minami-Nagayama-eki) is a railway station in Asahikawa, Hokkaidō Prefecture, Japan. Its station number is A31.

== Lines ==
- Hokkaido Railway Company

- Sekihoku Main Line

== Adjacent stations ==
«	Service	»
Sekihoku Main Line
Limited Express Okhotsk: Does not stop at this station
Limited Express Taisetsu: Does not stop at this station
Shin-Asahikawa	Limited Rapid Kitami (Kitami-bound only)	Higashi-Asahikawa
Shin-Asahikawa	Local	Higashi-Asahikawa
