= Higashi-Asahikawa Station =

Railway station in Asahikawa, Hokkaido, Japan

Coordinates: 43°46′36″N 142°26′29″E

Higashi-Asahikawa Station 東旭川駅
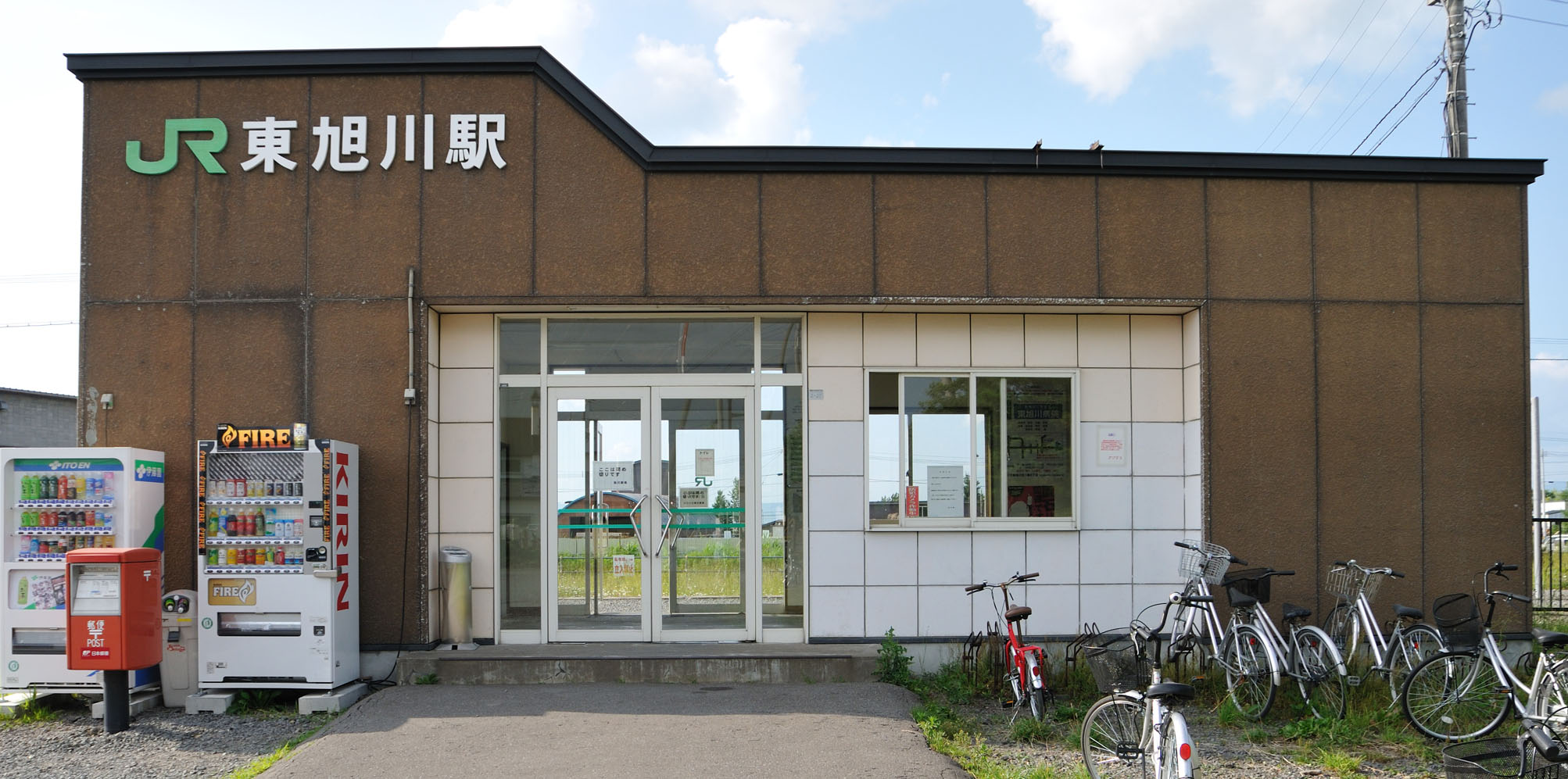

General information
- Location: Asahikawa, Hokkaido; Japan
- Operator: Hokkaido Railway Company
- Line: Sekihoku Main Line

Other information
- Station code: A32

History
- Opened: 1922
Location

Higashi-Asahikawa Station (東旭川駅, Higashi-Asahikawa-eki) is a railway station in Asahikawa, Hokkaidō Prefecture, Japan. Its station number is A32.

== Lines ==
- Hokkaido Railway Company

- Sekihoku Main Line

== History ==
Higashi-Asahikawa Station opened on 4 November 1922.

With the privatization of the Japan National Railway (JNR) on 1 April 1987, the station came under the aegis of the Hokkaido Railway Company (JR Hokkaido).

== Adjacent stations ==
«	Service	»
Sekihoku Main Line
Limited Express Okhotsk: Does not stop at this station
Limited Express Taisetsu: Does not stop at this station
Minami-Nagayama	Limited Rapid Kitami (Kitami-bound only)	Sakuraoka
Minami-Nagayama	Local	Sakuraoka
