= Asahikawa Museum of Sculpture =

Asahikawa Museum of Sculpture in Honor of Teijiro Nakahara
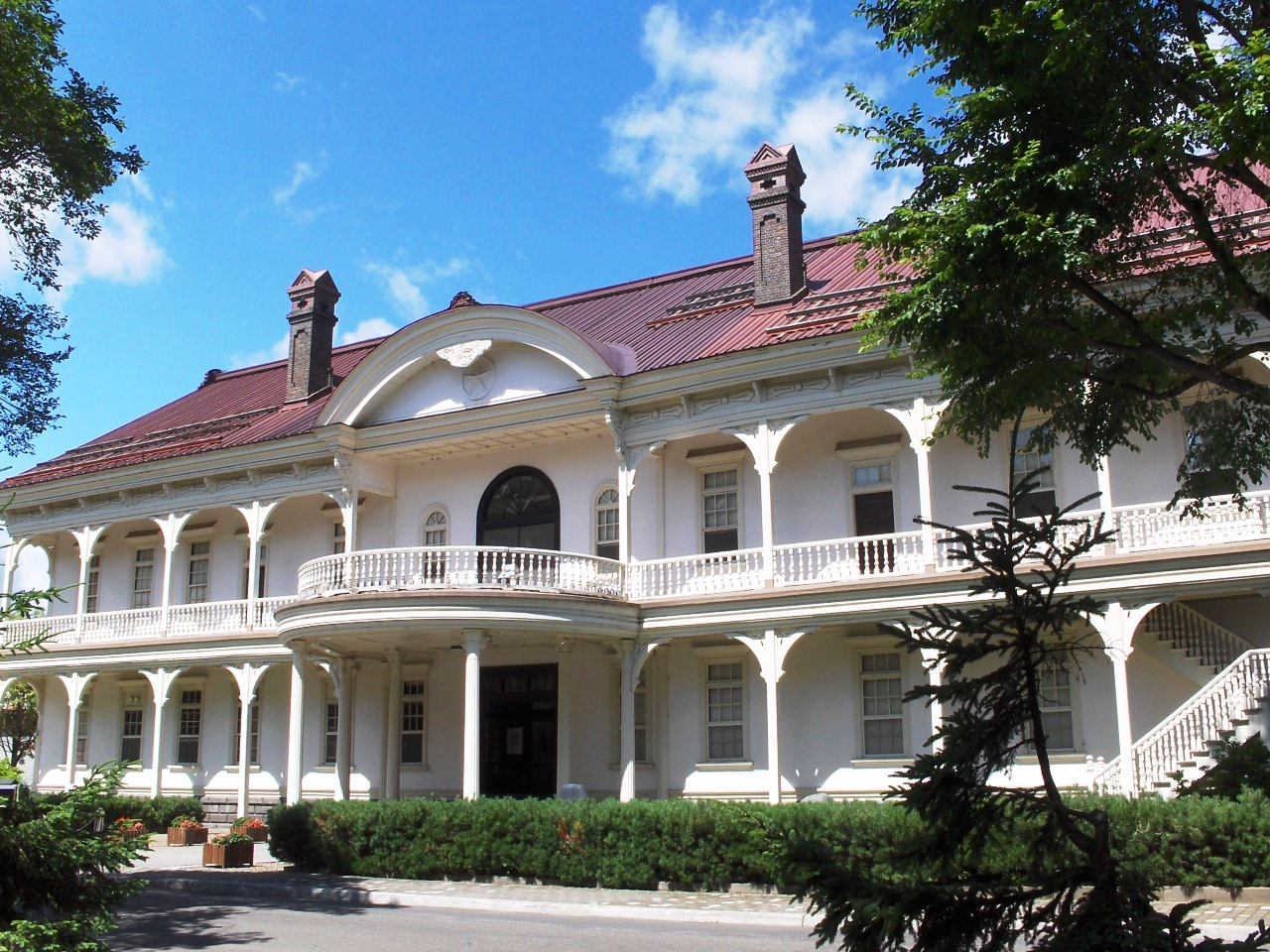
- The exterior of the Museum
- Established: 1902
- Location: Asahikawa, Hokkaidō, Japan
- Coordinates: 43.805212°N 142.3647°E
- Type: sculpture museum
- Curator: Asahikawa city
- Website: Museum page on city website

Asahikawa Museum of Sculpture in Honor of Teijiro Nakahara (中原悌二郎記念旭川市彫刻美術館, Nakahara Teijirō Kinen Asahikawashi Chōkoku Bijutsukan) is a sculpture museum in Asahikawa, Hokkaidō, Japan. The building was called the Asahikawa Kaikōsha (旭川偕行社) and used as the officer's social club by the 7th Division of the Imperial Japanese Army from 1902 until 1945. In 1968, it became the Asahikawa Museum of Local History (旭川市立旭川郷土博物館, Asahikawashiritsu Asahikawa Kyōdo Hakubutsukan). The building is designated an Important Cultural Property.

== History ==
=== Asahikawa Kaikōsha ===
In 1896, the Tondenhei, the army engaged in farming and security in Hokkaidō prefecture, was formed; the Imperial Japanese Army 7th Division was settled in Sapporo. The division transferred its operational area to Asahikawa between 1900 and 1902. The Asahikawa Kaikōsha, the building for the army officer's clubhouse (which later serves as the museum) was completed in 1902. It was constructed by the Okuragumi, a construction company which currently is the Taisei Corporation.

The building was constructed with the western style, and a gate and some barracks in which soldiers of the division dwelt were initially built around the Kaikōsha. Originally, the Kaikōsha was used as a hotel, guest house, and assembly hall for the army and division's officials. Japanese crown prince Yoshihito and Hirohito, who became the Emperor of Japan in later life, stayed at the building.

After Japan was defeated in World War II, the Kaikōsha was used as the assembly hall of the American army. After the ownership of the Kaikōsha was moved from the government of Japan to the Asahikawa city in 1949, the building was used as an interim schoolhouse.

=== Museums ===
==== Asahikawa Museum of Local History ====
In 1968, the building of the Kaikōsha was restored to use it as a museum, and the Asahikawa Museum of Local History was opened. Renovated to its original exterior, the museum has displayed historical materials including records of the Ainu people.

Due to its western design and historical architecture, the building of the Asahikawa Museum of Local History was designated as one of the Important Cultural Properties of Japan on May 19, 1989.

In September 1993, the museum was moved to the newly established Asahikawa Taisetsu Crystal Hall (a complex building including music hall, museum, and assembly hall) and renamed the Asahikawa City Museum.

==== Museum of Sculpture ====
On June 1, 1994, the building was renovated and used as the Asahikawa Museum of Sculpture in Honor of Teijiro Nakahara. Teijiro Nakahara is a modern sculptor born in Kushiro, Hokkaidō, lived in Asahikawa in his childhood, and the museum was named after him. The year 2002 marked 100 years since the building of the Asahikawa Kaikōsha was completed: A 100th anniversary exhibition was held.

As of 2008, it is the only building in Asahikawa city to be designated as an Important Cultural Property of Japan.

== Overview ==
The two-storied museum is a timbered and western building. The western style structure, which is also seen at the exterior of the Hōheikan in Sapporo, is characteristic architectural style in Hokkaidō prefecture.

The museum mainly exhibits the records of 12 Teijiro Nakahara and Teijiro Nakahara awarded sculpture works. Temporary exhibitions are held including the exhibition of Bikky Sunazawa, a wood carving sculptor born in Asahikawa.

In addition to the exhibition of sculpture works, events including concert and public lectures for children are held. Each year, the presentation ceremony of the Teijiro Nakahara Award, which is given to superior sculptors, is held on October 3, Nakahara's date of birth.

The museum is next to the Yasushi Inoue Memorial Museum and Shunkō Garden.
