= The Hunting Gun =

1949 Japanese novella

- Cover for 1961 edition translated by Sadamichi Yokoö and Sanford Goldstein.
- Author: Yasushi Inoue
- Original title: Ryōjū
- Translator: Sadamichi Yokoö and Sanford Goldstein (1961); George Saito (1962); Michael Emmerich (2014)
- Language: Japanese
- Publisher: Bungakukai
- Publication date: 1949
- Publication place: Japan
- English publication date: 1961, 1962, 2014
- Media type: Print

The Hunting Gun a.k.a. Shotgun (Japanese: 猟銃, Hepburn: Ryōjū) is a Japanese novella by Yasushi Inoue first published in 1949. Spanning in time between the mid 1930s and late 1940s, it tells the story of a love affair between a married man and his wife's cousin, recounted through three long letters.

== Plot ==
In a prologue, a nameless poet, after publishing a poem depicting a lonely hunter whose sight impressed him, is contacted by a man named Misugi who recognised himself as the described hunter. Misugi sends him three letters, one by his niece Shoko, the second by his wife Midori, and the third by his lover Saiko. These letters take up the major part of the book, with each woman describing the past events from a different perspective, a technique similar to Akira Kurosawa's 1950 film Rashomon.

Misugi, a company director and art collector, is newly married to the much younger and inexperienced Midori. Midori's older cousin Saiko is married to physician Kadota, with whom she has a daughter, Shoko. When Saiko learns of Kadota's adultery, she divorces him. Saiko visits Midori, making a great impression on Misugi with her sophistication and education. Misugi falls in love with her, and soon the two start a passionate affair. Saiko feels guilty for her betrayal of her younger cousin, vowing that she will kill herself if Midori ever found out. Unknown to her, Midori finds out about the adultery but decides to keep calm about her discovery. Midori has short affairs with other men while her marriage with Misugi deteriorates into coldness and loneliness. During a visit to the ill Saiko, Midori finally tells her that she knows all about her and Misugi's affair. Saiko, also devastated about the news that her ex-husband remarried, asks Shoko to burn her diary for her and commits suicide with poison. Instead of destroying it as told, Shoko reads her mother's diary, dismayed about its content.

Back in the present, in a short epilogue, the poet reflects on Misugi's character.

== Publication history ==
The Hunting Gun first appeared in the October 1949 edition of Bungakukai magazine. The novella's opening poem had previously appeared under the same title and in slightly different form in the October 1948 issue of Shibunka magazine.

== Reception ==
In his preface to the American edition of Inoue's novel Tun-huang, Damion Searls called The Hunting Gun Inoue's "masterpiece", an "exquisite book showcasing Inoue's great strengths–his remarkably sympathetic, complex and true female characters" and "a love story with multiple narrators where each narrative dramatically reshapes our understanding of the rest".

== Translations ==
The Hunting Gun was translated by Sadamichi Yokō and Sanford Goldstein in 1961 and by George Saito as Shotgun in the 1962 anthology Modern Japanese Short Stories. A new translation, again as The Hunting Gun, was provided by Michael Emmerich in 2014.

== Adaptations ==
The Hunting Gun was adapted by director Heinosuke Gosho for his 1961 film Hunting Rifle. It was also adapted for Japanese television in 1957 and 1963 and for Swiss television in 1971.

A stage play adaptation directed by François Girard premiered in 2011. In 2018, an opera adaptation composed by Thomas Larcher premiered at the Bregenz Festival, Austria.

== Bibliography ==
- Inoue, Yasushi (1961). The Hunting Gun. Translated by Goldstein, Sanford; Yokō, Sadamichi. Rutland and Tokyo: Tuttle Publishing.
- Inoue, Yasushi (1962). "Shotgun". In Morris, Ivan (ed.). Modern Japanese Short Stories: An Anthology. Translated by Saito, George. Rutland and Tokyo: Tuttle Publishing.
- Inoue, Yasushi (2014). The Hunting Gun. Translated by Emmerich, Michael. London: Pushkin Press. ISBN 978-1-78227001-0.
