= Asahiyama Zoo =

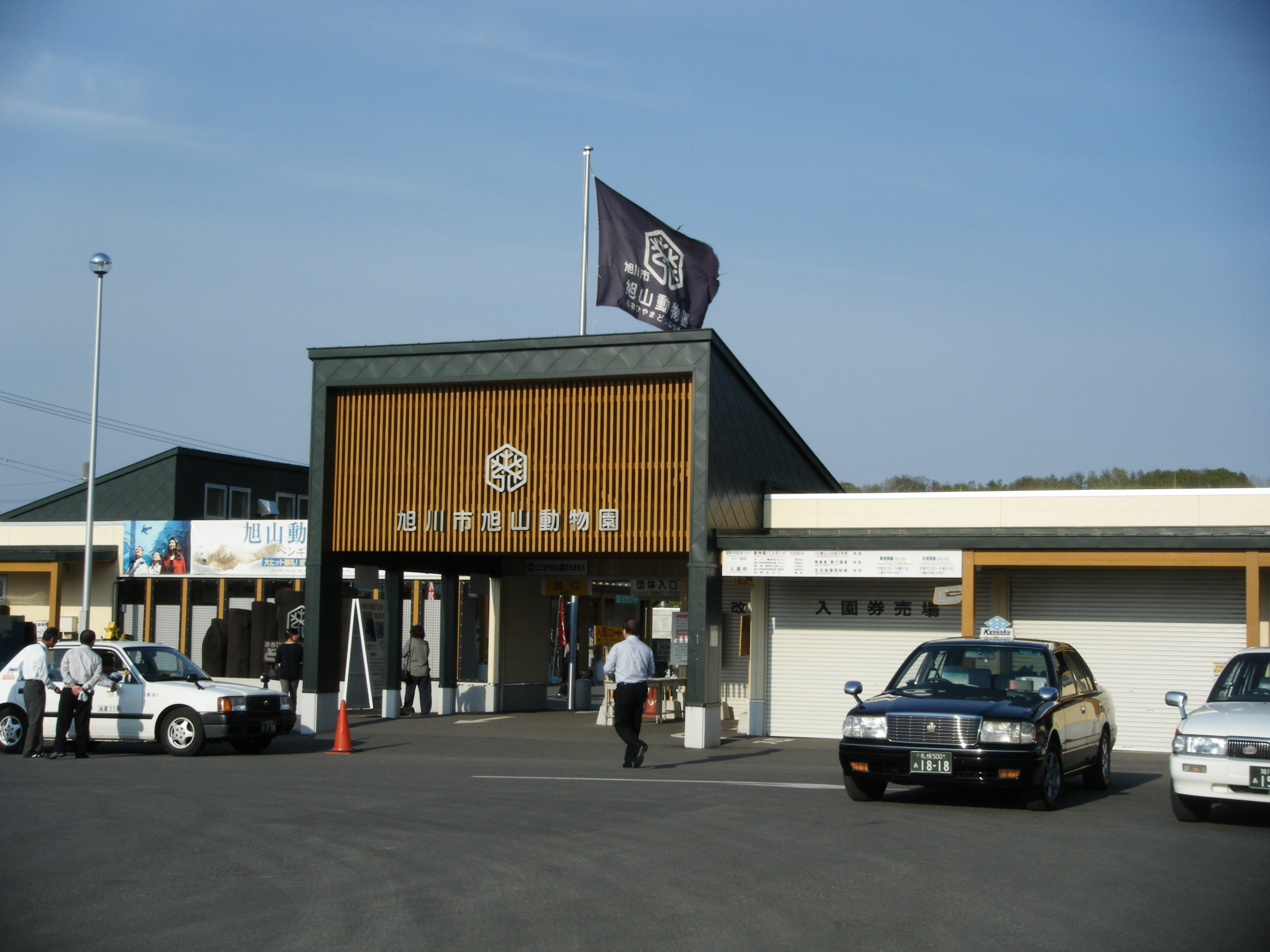
- Main gate
- Interactive map of Asahiyama Zoo
- 43°46′05″N 142°28′47″E
- Date opened: July 1967
- Location: Asahikawa, Hokkaidō, Japan
- Annual visitors: 3,000,000 (2007)
- Memberships: JAZA
- Website: www.city.asahikawa.hokkaido.jp/asahiyamazoo/

The Asahiyama Zoo (旭山動物園, Asahiyama dōbutsuen) is a municipal zoo that opened in July 1967 in Asahikawa, Hokkaidō, Japan, and is the northernmost zoo in the country. In August 2004, over 320,000 people had visited the zoo, the second-highest number of visitors among all the zoos in Japan. Located in Higashi Asahikawa, on the outskirts of Asahikawa, the Asahiyama Zoo is accredited by the Japanese Association of Zoos and Aquariums (JAZA).

== History ==
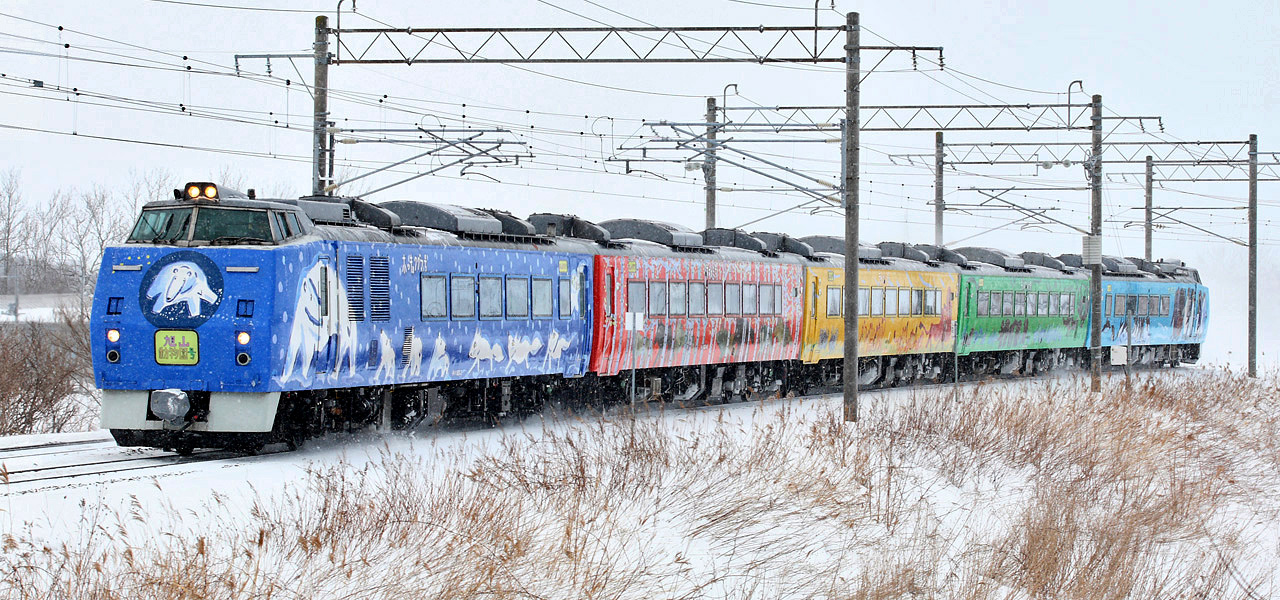
JR Hokkaido's Asahiyama Zoo Train from the Sapporo area.

The Maruyama Zoo in Sapporo and the Obihiro Zoo predate the construction of the Asahiyama Zoo. In 1964, the mayor at the time, Kōzō Igarashi, budgeted for the Asahiyama Zoo project, and chose Mount Asahi as the building site due to its geology and traffic convenience. Construction of the Asahiyama Zoo began in April 1966, and was completed in June 1967, at a total expense of 250 million yen. The zoo was inaugurated on July 1, 1967, with 75 species of animals including 200 common carp. Driven by a decline in visitors, the park erected a steel roller coaster which was dismantled in 2006.

As the population of Asahikawa has increased, the number of visitors rose to a peak of 597,000 in 1983. In 1994, when a western lowland gorilla and a ring-tailed lemur in the zoo died of an echinococcus infection, the zoo was closed before the regular season to prevent the disease from spreading. This resulted in a decline in the number of visitors.

Since 1997, the zoo has undertaken the construction of unique interactive animal viewing facilities, initiated by chief manager Masao Kosuge. After "Totori no Mura" (Totori's Village), which enables visitors to see birds flying freely in a huge cage, the zoo continued to install new facilities including Polar Bear Aquatic Park, a "walk-through" penguin aquarium, an orangutan trapeze, and a seal aquarium which includes a vertical tube through which the seals can swim.

In August 2004, the monthly number of visitors exceeded 320,000, which surpassed Ueno Zoo in Tokyo. In 2006, the annual number of visitors reached 2 million, and the following year, the number was 3 million, which was surpassed only by the Ueno Zoo (about 3.5 million people in the same year). Over the years, the Asahiyama Zoo has drawn a number of media attractions, and some TV programs and publications featuring the zoo's success have also been created.

== Animals ==
Polar bear house

- Polar bear

Seal house

- Spotted seal
- Slaty-backed gull

Penguin house

- Gentoo penguin
- Humboldt penguin
- King penguin
- Western rockhopper penguin

Fierce animal house

- Amur leopard
- Amur tiger
- Lion
- Snow leopard

Forests of wolves and sika deer

- Timber wolf
- Yezo sika deer

Monkey house

- Abyssinian black-and-white colobus
- De Brazza's monkey
- Ring-tailed lemur

Chimpanzee forest

- Chimpanzee

Spider monkey and capybara house

- Black-handed spider monkey
- Capybara

Hippopotamus house

- Common ostrich
- Crested porcupine
- Hippopotamus

Gibbon house

- Lar gibbon
- Reeves's muntjac

Monkey mountain

- Japanese macaque
- Japanese wild boar

Flying bird and flamingo house

- American flamingo
- Bar-headed goose
- Black swan
- Chilean flamingo
- Eastern spot-billed duck
- Greater flamingo
- Mallard
- Snow goose
- Tufted duck
- Whooper swan

Orangutan house

- Bornean orangutan

Hokkaido Small Animals Area

- Common raccoon
- Eurasian eagle-owl
- Ezo flying squirrel
- Ezo mountain hare
- Ezo red fox
- Great spotted woodpecker
- Japanese raccoon dog
- Japanese scops owl
- Mandarin duck
- Mountain hawk-eagle
- Steller's sea eagle
- Ural owl
- White-tailed eagle

Amphibian and reptile house

- Ezo salamander
- Iberian ribbed newt
- Japanese four-lined ratsnake
- Japanese grass lizard
- Japanese pond turtle
- Japanese rat snake
- Mamushi

=== Ezo brown bear house ===
- Ezo brown bear

=== Children's Pasture ===
- Chicken
- Common peafowl
- Domestic duck
- Domestic rabbit
- Goat
- Guinea pig
- Pig
- Sheep

=== Notable species ===
- Blakiston's fish owl
- Pallas's cat
- Red-crowned crane
- Red panda
- Reindeer
- Reticulated giraffe
- Snowy owl
