= Mount Asahi (Ishikari) =

- 旭山
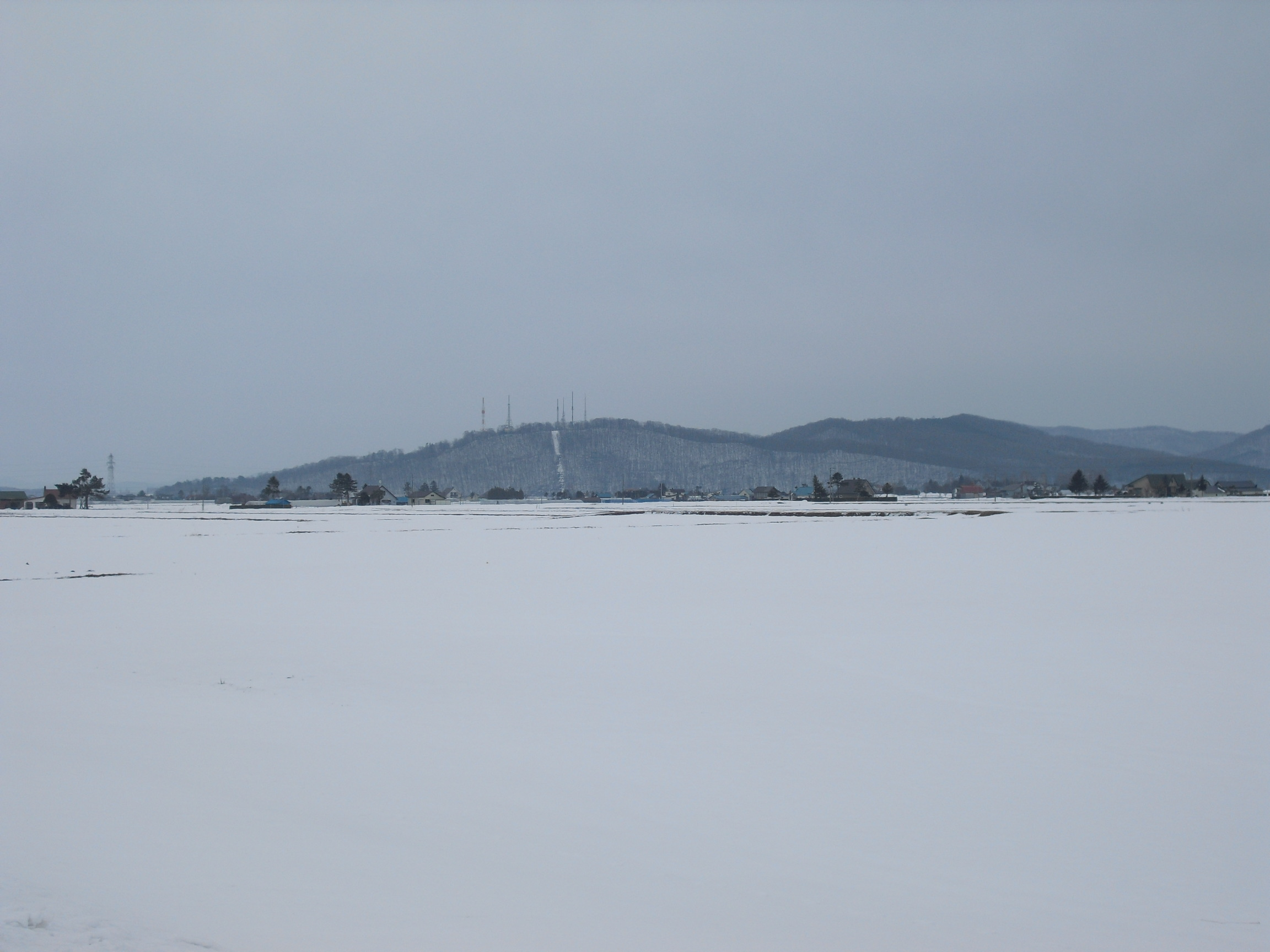
- Mount Asahi, site of a triangulation station (April 2010)

Highest point
- Elevation: 295.2 m (969 ft)
- Listing: List of mountains and hills of Japan by height
- Coordinates: 43°45′52″N 142°29′19″E

Naming
- Language of name: Japanese

Geography
- Location within Japan
- Location: Hokkaidō, Japan
- Parent range: Ishikari Mountains
- Topo map(s): Geographical Survey Institute 25000:1 永山; 25000:1 当麻; 50000:1 旭川

Mount Asahi (旭山, Asahi-yama) is a mountain in Asahikawa, Hokkaidō, Japan. It is part of the Ishikari Mountains.

Mount Asahi hosts Mount Asahi Park and Asahiyama Zoo.

== Geology ==
Mount Asahi is formed from non-alkaline mafic rock from the middle to late Miocene. Non-alkaline rock from pyroclastic flows in the late Miocene to early Pliocene are also present. The flanks of the mountain include accretionary complex of Permian basalt block and a melange mix of late Jurassic to early Cretaceous.
