= Asahiyama stable (2016) =

Organization of sumo wrestlers

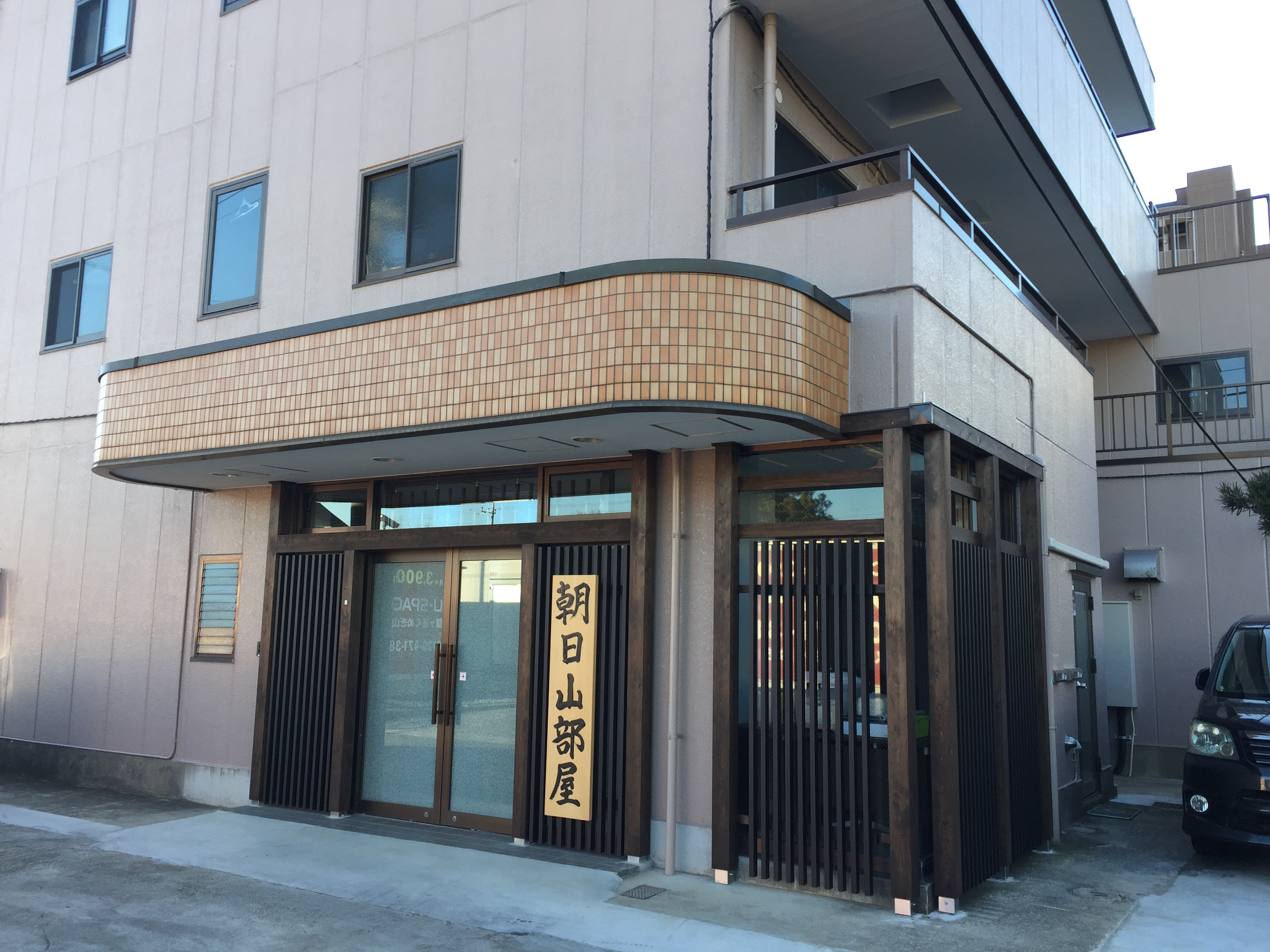

Asahiyama stable (朝日山部屋, Asahiyama-beya) is a stable of sumo wrestlers, part of the Isegahama ichimon (or group of stables). It is located in Chiba prefecture.

The stable's predecessor in the name had a very long history in sumo, however the current incarnation is unrelated to it. A year after the closing of the previous incarnation of the stable, the retired former Kotonishiki, after several years of borrowing elder names, finally acquired the vacant elder name of Asahiyama, and set up his stable, a dream he had had long before. He financed a building to house his stable in Kamagaya, Chiba, near Kunugiyama Station on some land he had procured, quite near the stable he originally wrestled for, Sadogatake of the Nishonoseki ichimon. Owner Asahiyama's hope was that he could bring together the demanding training he learned as an active wrestler in his original stable, Sadogatake (one of the strongest stables in sumo) and the warmheartedness towards trainees that he later learned as a coach at Oguruma stable.

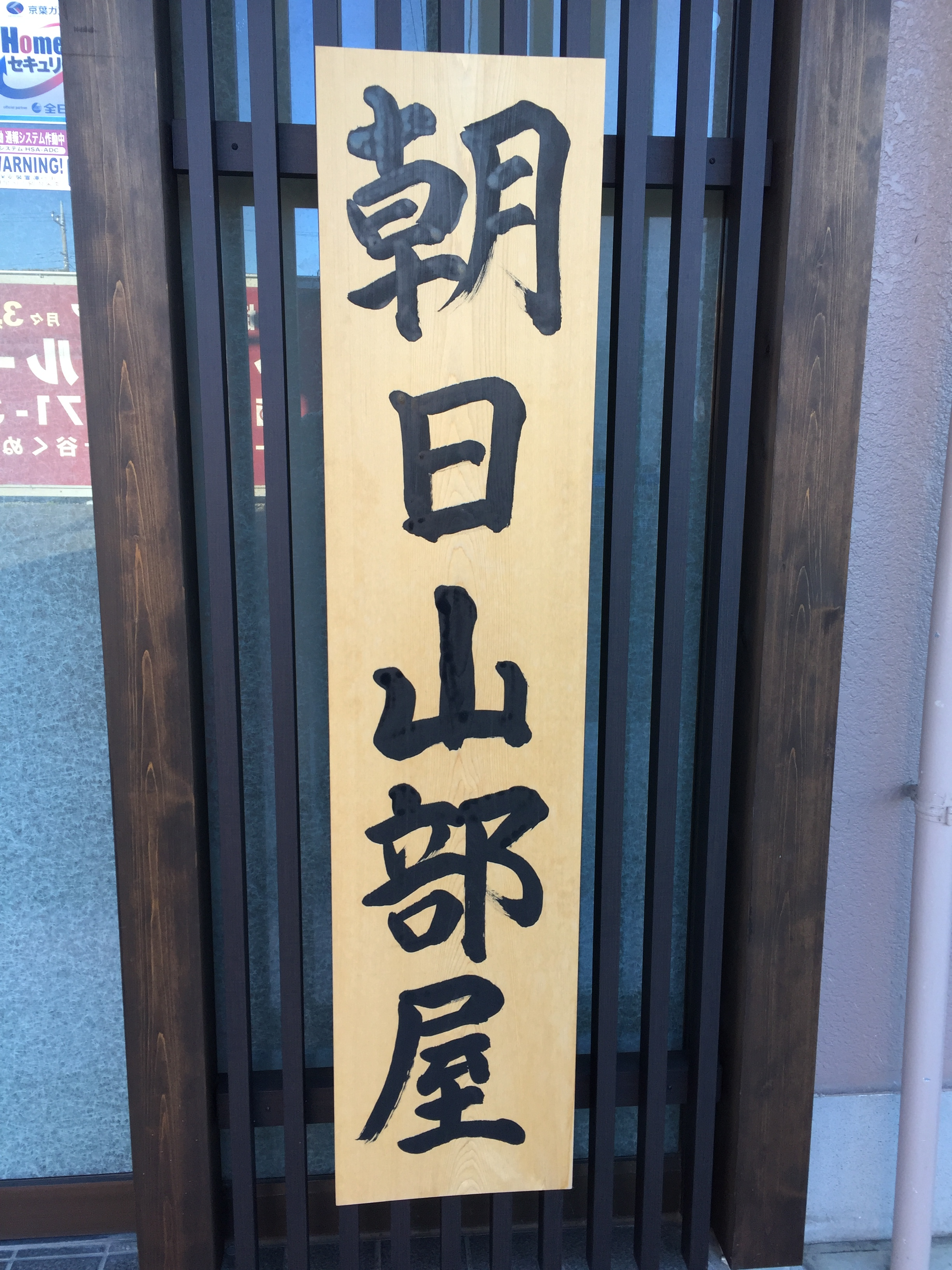

He took three low-ranked wrestlers from the aforementioned Oguruma stable (which, along with Sadogatake, is also a member of the same Nishonoseki ichimon) to join his new stable. In January 2017 the stable left the Nishonoseki ichimon and joined the Isegahama ichimon (to which the previous incarnation of Asahiyama stable had belonged.) It was announced in February 2017 that Asahiyama's 18-year-old son, Akihide, would be joining the stable as a new recruit upon graduation from high school in March. He fought under the name Wakaseido. In January 2023, it had eight wrestlers, with no sekitori yet.

The stable is known for being an organization that breaks away from the traditional shackles of sumo stables. In 2021, it organized a shelter for animals awaiting adoption, launching a program to take in cats abandoned during the COVID crisis. Since the death of comedian Ken Shimura, the stable has also taken in his dog. Also in 2021, the stable also opened a bakery under the impetus of the ōkami-san, who is a certified baking instructor, and the second daughter of the master, who is a certified nutritionist. The stable's bakery is known for its success, as the setting made it popular, with customers coming not only from the neighborhood but also from other prefectures.

As of May 2026, the stable has 6 active wrestlers.

== Ring name conventions ==
Currently, the wrestlers who branched out to the new stable with the former Kotonishiki have taken shikona starting with "Asahi", (朝日) meaning morning sun, and which are the first two characters in the owner's elder name and that of the stable.

== Owner ==
- 2016–present: 19th Asahiyama (iin, former sekiwake Kotonishiki, born 1968)

== Notable active wrestlers ==
- None

== Referee ==
- 12th Shikimori Kandayu (san'yaku gyōji, real name Hiroshi Kikuchi, born 1968)

== Usher ==
- Takeru (jonidan yobidashi, real name, Takeru Miyasaka, born 2024)

== Location and access ==
Chiba, Kamagaya City, Kunigiyama 2–1–5
5 minute walk from Kunugiyama Station on Keisei Matsudo Line

== See also ==
- List of sumo stables
- List of active sumo wrestlers
- List of past sumo wrestlers
- Glossary of sumo terms
