= Kotonishiki Katsuhiro =

Sumo wrestler

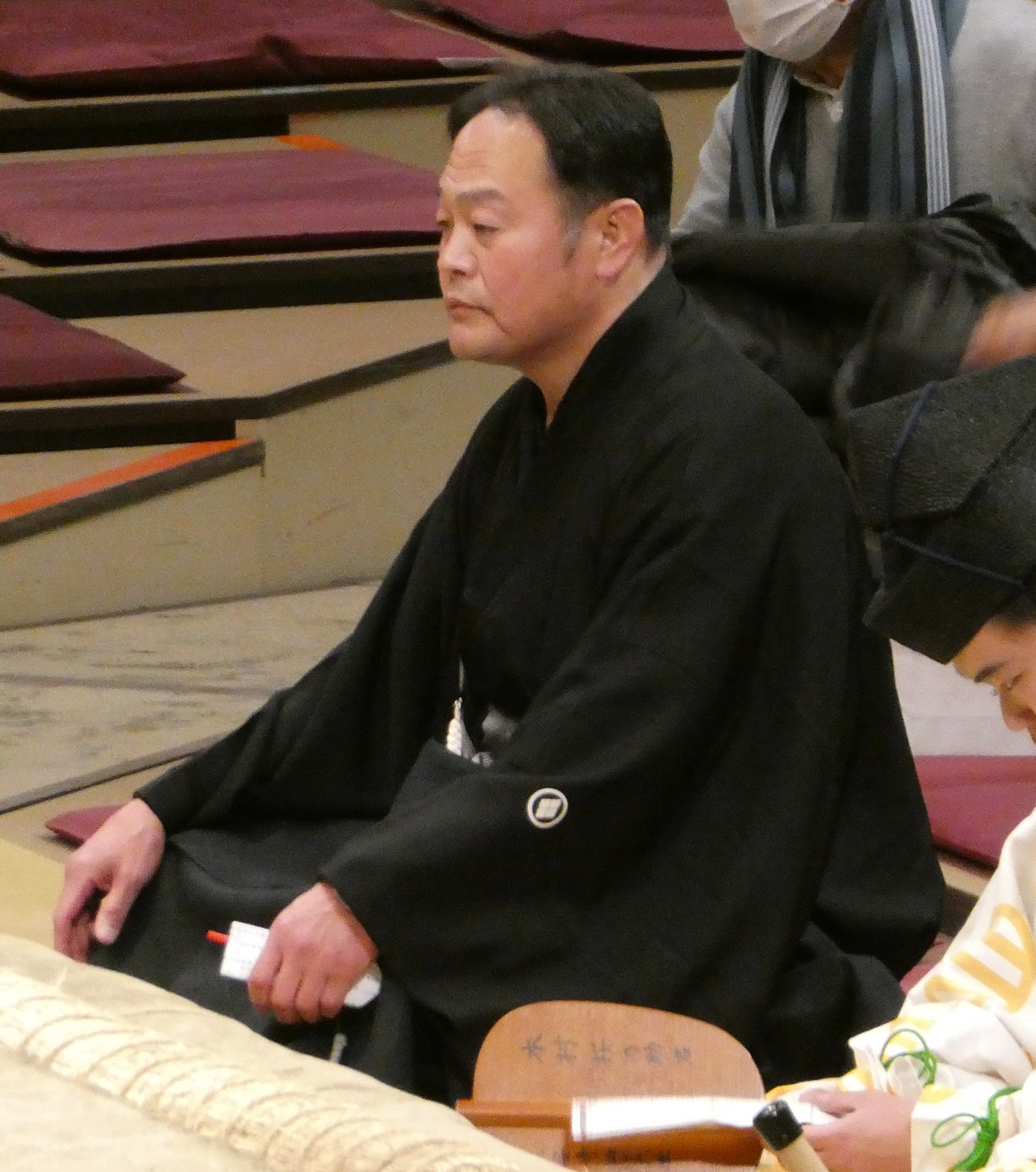

Personal information
- Native name: 琴錦 功宗
- Born: Hideyuki Matsuzawa; June 8, 1968 (age 58) Gunma, Japan
- Height: 1.76 m (5 ft 9 1/2 in)
- Weight: 131.5 kg (290 lb)

Sport
- Sport: Sumo
- Retired: September, 2000
- Heya: Sadogatake
- Record: 663-557-58
- Debut: March, 1984
- Highest rank: Sekiwake (November, 1990)
- Elder name: Asahiyama
- Championships: 2 (Makuuchi)
- Special Prizes: Outstanding Performance (7); Fighting Spirit (3); Technique (8)
- Gold Stars: 8 Takanohana II (3); Wakanohana III (2); Akebono; Hokutoumi; Chiyonofuji
- Updated on Jan 2018

Kotonishiki Katsuhiro (born June 8, 1968 as Hideyuki Matsuzawa) is a former sumo wrestler from Takasaki, Gunma Prefecture, Japan. He began his career in 1984, reaching the top makuuchi division in 1989. He won two top division tournament titles from the maegashira ranks (the only wrestler ever to do so), the first in 1991 and the second in 1998. His highest rank was sekiwake, which he held 21 times. He earned eighteen special prizes during his career, second on the all-time list, and defeated yokozuna eight times when ranked as a maegashira. He retired in 2000 and after a long stint as a sumo coach at Oguruma stable, took the vacant elder name Asahiyama and branched out to form his own stable of the same name.

== Early career ==
He was born in the former Misato, Gunma. At the wish of his father, he practiced both sumo and judo from a young age. After competing in the National Junior High School Sumo Championships at the age of 14, he met former yokozuna Kotozakura who persuaded him to join Sadogatake stable. He made his professional debut in March 1984. His first shikona or fighting name was Kotomatsuzawa, based on his own surname. He switched to Kotonishiki in late 1987 and shortly afterwards made the elite sekitori ranks, being promoted to the jūryō division in March 1988. A losing score of 4-11 meant he was demoted back to the unsalaried makushita division after only one tournament, but he returned to the second division in September 1988 and was promoted to the top makuuchi division in May 1989 after an 11-4 record at jūryō 6 in March.

Kotonishiki steadily made his way up the maegashira ranks, and in May 1990 earned his first sanshō or special prize, for Fighting Spirit. In this tournament he also defeated yokozuna Hokutoumi to win the first of his eight kinboshi. He made his debut in the titled san'yaku ranks at komusubi in September 1990 and came through with a winning record. This earned him promotion to sekiwake for November. He was to spend a total of 34 tournaments ranked at either sekiwake or komusubi, which is an all-time record.

== First tournament win ==
In the latter half of 1991 Kotonishiki made a strong drive for ōzeki promotion. He recovered from losing his sekiwake rank after the July tournament and falling back to the maegashira ranks, by coming back to win the tournament championship or yūshō in September 1991, blowing away Mainoumi in seconds on the final day to finish with a 13-2 record, one win ahead of ōzeki Kirishima. There were no yokozuna completing this tournament, with Hokutoumi absent and Asahifuji withdrawing partway through. Kotonishiki followed up with an excellent 12-3 in November, finishing as runner-up to Konishiki, the closest any maegashira yūshō winner has come to repeating the feat in the next tournament. He needed one more good performance in the following January 1992 tournament to earn promotion to ōzeki, but he lost his opening four matches and could only score 7-8. He made a second attempt in late 1992 when he produced two consecutive runner-up performances, but after standing at 7-3 on the 10th day of the January 1993 tournament he collapsed to lose his last five bouts and finished with a losing 7-8 score. Although he produced many good performances over the next few years, he was never consistent enough to mount another challenge for ōzeki promotion, and was overtaken by younger wrestlers such as the Hanada brothers Takanohana and Wakanohana, and then Takanonami and Musashimaru.

== Later career ==
In May 1998 Kotonishiki was runner-up for the fourth time and returned to komusubi, but he was sidelined through injury in the next tournament and managed only five wins on his return. This sent him down to maegashira 12 for the November 1998 tournament, his lowest rank since his top division debut in May 1989. Kotonishiki responded by winning his first 11 matches and though he lost to yokozuna Wakanohana on Day 12, he defeated Takanohana and Takanonami over the next two days to clinch the championship. He finished with an outstanding 14-1 record. This victory made him the only wrestler ever to win two tournaments from the maegashira ranks. The seven-year gap between his first and second championships is also the longest ever. He was also awarded special prizes for the final time, receiving his eighth Technique and seventh Outstanding Performance Award. These plus his three Fighting Spirit Prizes gave him a total of eighteen career sanshō, the most ever at the time (although he was overtaken the following year by Akinoshima).

Now over 30 years of age, Kotonishiki was no longer able to maintain a position in the san'yaku ranks, but he was still a threat, as he defeated yokozuna in three consecutive tournaments from March to July 1999.

== Retirement from sumo ==
In March 2000 Kotonishiki had to withdraw on the 5th day of the tournament through injury, with only two wins. As a result, he fell to the jūryō division for the first time since 1989. On his comeback in July he scored an 8-7 majority of wins at the rank of jūryō 1 but did not get promoted back to the top division; an extremely rare occurrence. In the September 2000 tournament, after losing six of his first seven bouts, he announced his retirement from sumo, saying that he had reached his physical limit and could no longer overcome his various injuries. His top division winning record was above 50 percent, with 506 wins against 441 losses, which is unusual for a non-ōzeki.

Kotonishiki remained in the sumo world as a coach, initially at Sadogatake stable and later at the affiliated Oguruma stable. For many years he was unable to acquire a permanent toshiyori or elder name. For the first two years of his retirement he had jun-toshiyori status and was known as Kotonishiki Oyakata. When that expired he borrowed the Wakamatsu name in 2002 and then the Takenawa name in 2003. From July 2007 until January 2009 he borrowed Kaiō's Asakayama name. He then used Kisenosato's toshiyori kabu of Araiso. In September 2009 he switched to the Hidenoyama kabu vacated by the retiring Hasegawa, now owned by ōzeki Kotoshōgiku. In January 2014 he switched to yet another kabu (owned by Yoshikaze) and was known as Nakamura until January 2016, when he finally acquired a permanent elder name, Asahiyama, and started the Asahiyama stable in June 2016.

His stable is known for breaking out of traditional shackles, also being an animal shelter and a bakery, the latter having been opened at the instigation of his wife and by his eldest daughter.

== Fighting style ==
Kotonishiki was regarded as an oshi-sumo specialist, favouring tsuki (thrusting) and oshi (pushing) techniques. His high-speed style was called "F1 Sumo." However, he was also capable of fighting on the mawashi or belt. Somewhat unusually, his preferred grip on the mawashi was morozashi, with both arms inside his opponent's. His most common winning kimarite was yori-kiri (force out), closely followed by oshi-dashi (push out). Together these two techniques accounted for half his victories at sekitori level. He very rarely employed throwing moves, with the exception of sukuinage, a beltless scoop throw.

== Personal life ==
In early 1991 Kotonishiki's personal life hit the headlines when it was revealed he had proposed to one woman having already secretly married another. In the event he returned to his legal wife and they had a daughter together. It was announced in February 2017 that his 18 year old son, Akihide Matsuzawa, would be joining his Asahiyama stable as a professional sumo wrestler upon graduation from high school in March. He fought under the name Wakaseido and reach the rank of sandanme 70. He retired in July 2022.

== Career record ==
Kotonishiki Katsuhiro
Year	January Hatsu basho, Tokyo	March Haru basho, Osaka	May Natsu basho, Tokyo	July Nagoya basho, Nagoya	September Aki basho, Tokyo	November Kyūshū basho, Fukuoka
1984	x	(Maezumo)	West Jonokuchi #14; 5–2	West Jonidan #103; 6–1	East Jonidan #34; 3–4	East Jonidan #46; 4–3
1985	East Jonidan #27; 4–3	East Jonidan #7; 2–5	West Jonidan #34; 6–1	East Sandanme #78; 3–4	West Sandanme #96; 6–1	West Sandanme #46; 2–5
1986	West Sandanme #72; 4–3	West Sandanme #49; 4–3	East Sandanme #33; 6–1	East Makushita #55; 4–3	East Makushita #41; 3–4	East Makushita #54; 5–2
1987	West Makushita #36; 5–2	East Makushita #21; 6–1–P	East Makushita #7; 5–2	East Makushita #2; 3–4	West Makushita #5; 3–4	West Makushita #10; 5–2
1988	East Makushita #4; 5–2	West Jūryō #12; 4–11	West Makushita #6; 5–2	West Makushita #1; 5–2	West Jūryō #12; 10–5	West Jūryō #5; 8–7
1989	West Jūryō #2; 6–9	East Jūryō #6; 11–4–P	West Maegashira #14; 8–7	East Maegashira #12; 8–7	West Maegashira #9; 7–8	East Maegashira #11; 8–7
1990	East Maegashira #6; 8–7	East Maegashira #2; 4–11	West Maegashira #6; 9–6; F★	East Maegashira #1; 9–6; O★	East Komusubi #1; 9–6; O	East Sekiwake #1; 10–5; OT
1991	East Sekiwake #1; 11–4; T	East Sekiwake #1; 9–6	East Sekiwake #1; 8–7	East Sekiwake #1; 4–11	East Maegashira #5; 13–2; F	West Komusubi #1; 12–3; O
1992	East Sekiwake #1; 7–8	East Maegashira #1; 9–6	East Komusubi #2; 9–6	West Sekiwake #1; 6–9	East Maegashira #1; 11–4	East Komusubi #1; 13–2; T
1993	West Sekiwake #1; 7–8	East Komusubi #1; 5–10	East Maegashira #3; 8–7	West Maegashira #1; 12–3; F	West Sekiwake #2; 9–6	West Sekiwake #1; 9–6
1994	East Sekiwake #2; 9–6	East Sekiwake #1; 10–5; T	East Sekiwake #1; 9–6	East Sekiwake #1; 3–12	West Maegashira #3; 8–7	West Komusubi #1; 8–7
1995	West Sekiwake #1; 4–5–6	West Maegashira #3; Sat out due to injury 0–0–15	West Maegashira #3; 8–7	East Maegashira #1; 8–7; O★	West Komusubi #2; 10–5; T	West Sekiwake #2; 8–7
1996	West Sekiwake #1; 9–6	West Sekiwake #1; 8–7	East Sekiwake #2; 4–11	West Maegashira #2; 9–6	West Komusubi #2; 10–5; T	West Sekiwake #2; 8–7
1997	West Sekiwake #1; 4–11	West Maegashira #3; 8–7	West Maegashira #1; 5–10	East Maegashira #5; 5–10	West Maegashira #9; 8–7	East Maegashira #4; 8–7
1998	West Komusubi #1; 10–5; T	East Komusubi #1; 6–9	East Maegashira #2; 11–4; O★	East Komusubi #1; 1–2–12	East Maegashira #7; 5–10	West Maegashira #12; 14–1; OT★
1999	East Komusubi #2; 6–9	West Maegashira #1; 6–9 ★	West Maegashira #3; 9–6 ★	East Maegashira #1; 8–7 ★	East Komusubi #1; 5–10	West Maegashira #2; 7–8
2000	East Maegashira #3; 3–12	West Maegashira #8; 2–3–10	West Jūryō #1; Sat out due to injury 0–0–15	West Jūryō #1; 8–7	East Jūryō #1; Retired; 1–7	x
Record given as wins–losses–absences Top division champion Top division runner-up Retired Lower divisions Non-participation Sanshō key: F=Fighting spirit; O=Outstanding performance; T=Technique Also shown: ★=Kinboshi; P=Playoff(s); Divisions: Makuuchi — Jūryō — Makushita — Sandanme — Jonidan — Jonokuchi Makuuchi ranks: Yokozuna — Ōzeki — Sekiwake — Komusubi — Maegashira

== See also ==
- Glossary of sumo terms
- List of past sumo wrestlers
- List of sumo elders
- List of sumo tournament top division champions
- List of sumo tournament top division runners-up
- List of sekiwake
