= Asahikawa =

Asahikawa 旭川市
- Core city
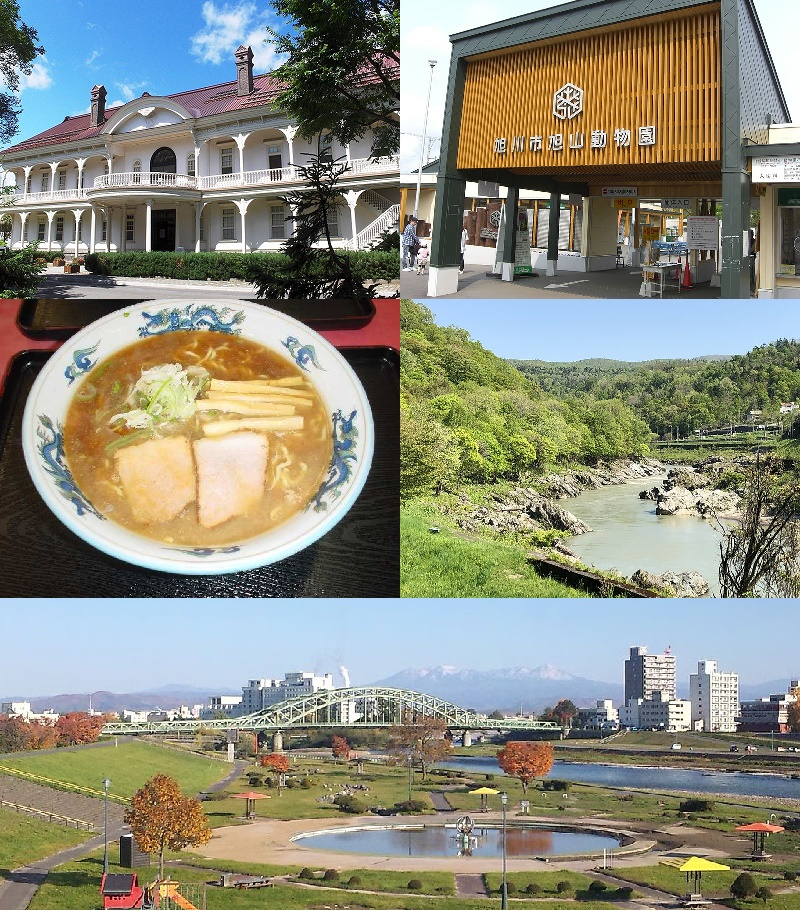
- Top: Asahikawa Museum of Sculpture, Asahiyama Animal Park; Middle: Asahikawa Ramen noodle, Kamuikotan; Bottom: Panoramic view of Asahi Bridge and Taisetsu Mountain Range, (all item of left to right)

- Flag Emblem

- Location of Asahikawa in Kamikawa Subprefecture, Hokkaido

- Location of Kamikawa Subprefecture in Hokkaido

- Location in Japan
- Coordinates: 43°46′N 142°22′E
- Country: Japan
- Region: Hokkaido
- Prefecture: Hokkaido
- First official recorded: 1877
- City Settled: August 1, 1922

Government
  - Mayor: Hirosuke Imazu

Area
  - Total: 747.66 km^{2} (288.67 sq mi)

Population (July 31, 2023)
  - Total: 321,906
  - Density: 430.55/km^{2} (1,115.1/sq mi)
- Time zone: UTC+09:00 (JST)
- City hall address: 9-46 Rokujō-dōri, Asahikawa-shi, Hokkaido; 070-8525
- Website: www.city.asahikawa.hokkaido.jp
- Symbols
- Bird: Bohemian waxwing
- Flower: Azalea
- Mascot: Asappy (あさっぴー) and Yukkirin (ゆっきりん)
- Tree: Japanese rowan

Various views around Asahikawa, 2022

Asahikawa (旭川市, Asahikawa-shi; Japanese pronunciation: [ä̀.sä́.çi̥.kä̀.β̞ä̀, -kä́.β̞ä́.ɕì]) is a city in Kamikawa Subprefecture, Hokkaido, Japan. It is the capital of the subprefecture, and the second-largest city in Hokkaido after Sapporo. It has been a core city since April 1, 2000. The city is currently well known for the Asahiyama Zoo, Asahikawa ramen, and its ski resort. On July 31, 2011, the city had an estimated population of 321,906, with 173,961 households, and a population density of 431 persons per km^{2} (1,100 persons per mi^{2}). The total area is 747.66 km^{2} (288.67 sq mi).

Asahikawa was designated a "Design City" by UNESCO's Creative Cities Network project on October 31, 2019, on the occasion of World Cities' Day.

== Overview ==
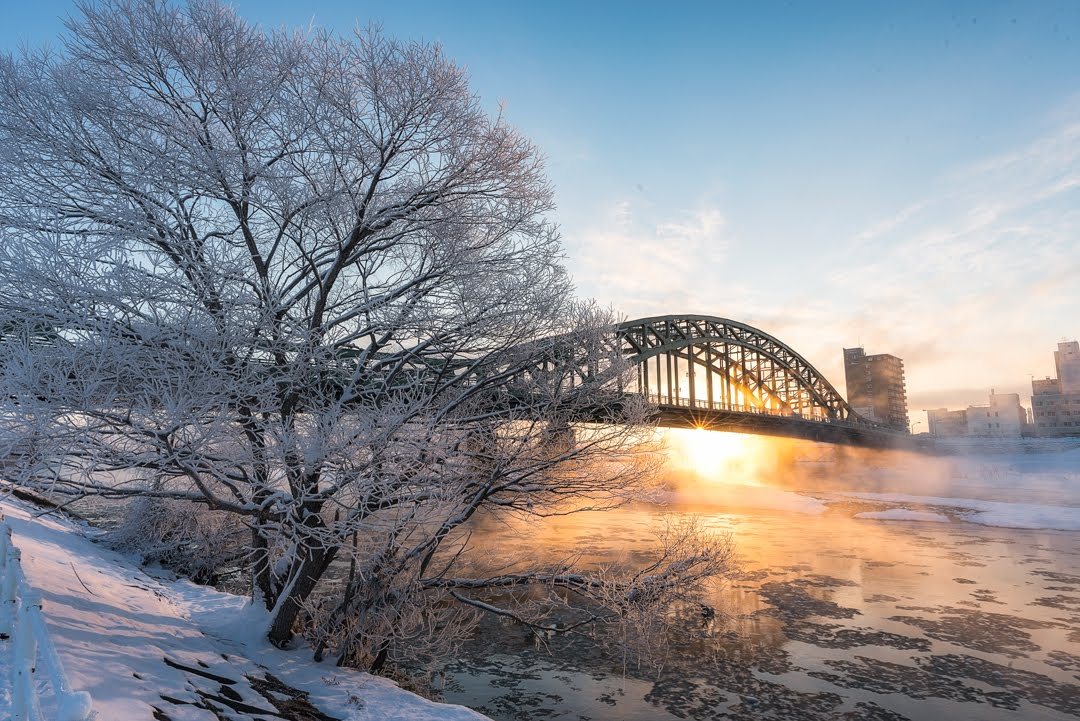
Asahibashi Bridge

On August 1, 1922, Asahikawa was founded as Asahikawa City. As the central city in northern Hokkaido, Asahikawa has been influential in industry and commerce. There are about 130 rivers and streams including the Ishikari River and Chūbetsu River, and over 740 bridges in the city. Asahibashi, a bridge over Ishikari River, has been one of the symbols of Asahikawa since its completion in 1932, and it was also registered as one of the Hokkaido Heritage sites on October 22, 2001.

Every winter, the Asahikawa Winter Festival is held on the bank of the Ishikari River, making use of Asahikawa's cold climate and snow. On January 25, 1902, a weather station recorded −41 °C (−41.8 °F), the lowest temperature in Japanese history. Due to its climate and location surrounded by mountains, there are some ski resorts in the outskirts of the city.

=== Name ===
The Ainu called the Asahi River Chiu Pet meaning "River of Waves", but it was misunderstood as Chup Pet, meaning "Sun River", and so it came to be called Asahi River in Japanese (Asahi meaning "morning sun").

== History ==
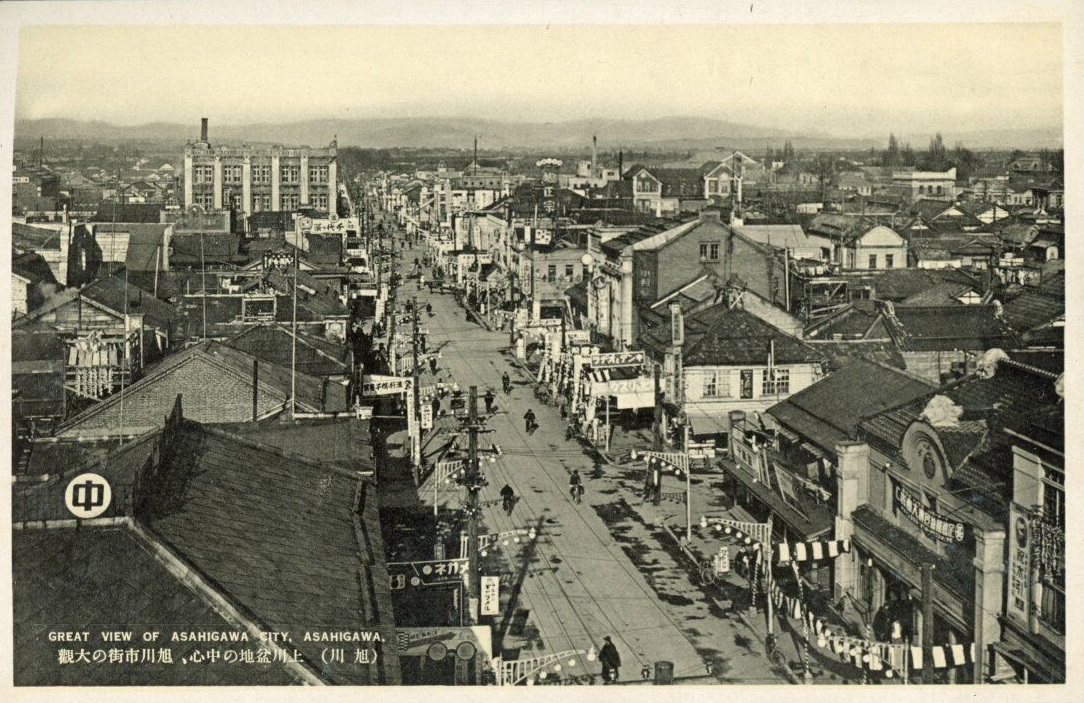
View of Asahikawa, circa 1920

Asahikawa was populated by the mainland Japanese in the Meiji period (1868 – July 1912) as a tondenhei, or state-sponsored farmer-militia settlement.

Kamikawa District set up under Ishikari Province with the villages of Asahikawa, Nagayama and Kamui in 1890.

- 1900 Asahikawa Village becomes Asahikawa town
- 1914 Asahikawa Town becomes Asahikawa-ku

Asahikawa was elevated to city status in 1922.

Asahikawa thrived as a military city before World War II, when the IJA 7th Division was posted there. During the closing stages of the war, Asahikawa was bombed by American naval aircraft in July 1945. Today, the 2nd Division of the Northern Army of the Japan Ground Self-Defense Force is headquartered in Asahikawa.

- 1955 Kamui Village and Etanbetsu Village merge with Asahikawa
- 1961 Nagayama Town merged
- 1963 Higashi-Asahikawa Town merged
- 1967 Asahiyama Zoo opened
- 1968 Kagura Town merged
- 1971 Higashi-Takasu Town merged
- 1972 Japan's first permanent pedestrian mall Heiwadōri Shopping Park opened
- April 1, 2000 Asahikawa becomes a core city

== Geography ==
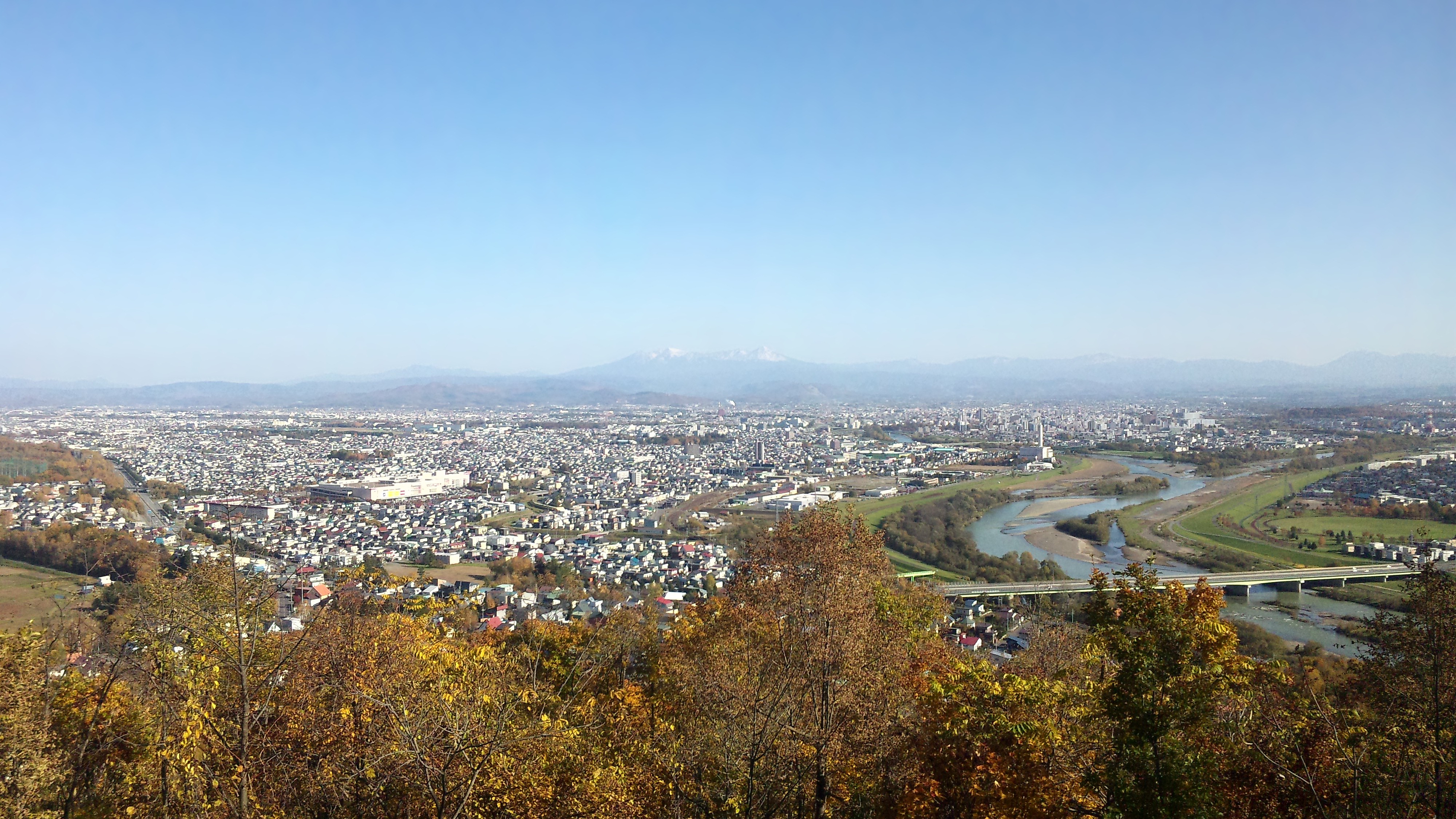
A panoramic view of Asahikawa from Mt. Arashiyama, 2016

== Climate ==
The climate is hemiboreal humid continental (Dfb, according to Köppen classification). Asahikawa winters are long and cold, with below-freezing average monthly temperatures from December through March. The city also sees an extraordinary amount of snowfall, averaging just under 7.6 m (25 ft) of snow per year. Summers are generally warm and humid in Asahikawa, with average high temperatures in the warmest months hovering around 26 °C (79 °F). Spring and autumn are generally short and transitional in the city.

It is one of the coldest Japanese cities as well as one of the most "continental". Japan's lowest temperature ever (−41.0 °C (−41.8 °F)) was recorded in Asahikawa, colder than other cities registered in Hokkaido, but warmer in absolute numbers than Mount Fuji. On January 12, 1909, the temperature did not rise above −22.5 °C (−9 °F), being one of the coldest in history. Some sources consider it the coldest city in Japan.

Climate data for Asahikawa (elevation 120 m, 1991–2020 normals, extremes 1888–present)
Month	Jan	Feb	Mar	Apr	May	Jun	Jul	Aug	Sep	Oct	Nov	Dec	Year
Record high °C (°F)	11.7 (53.1)	13.8 (56.8)	18.8 (65.8)	29.6 (85.3)	34.3 (93.7)	35.9 (96.6)	37.6 (99.7)	37.9 (100.2)	33.3 (91.9)	28.2 (82.8)	22.0 (71.6)	14.7 (58.5)	37.9 (100.2)
Mean maximum °C (°F)	3.2 (37.8)	5.4 (41.7)	11.4 (52.5)	21.5 (70.7)	27.8 (82.0)	29.7 (85.5)	31.5 (88.7)	32.1 (89.8)	28.7 (83.7)	21.7 (71.1)	15.8 (60.4)	6.5 (43.7)	33.0 (91.4)
Mean daily maximum °C (°F)	−3.3 (26.1)	−1.7 (28.9)	3.0 (37.4)	11.2 (52.2)	18.8 (65.8)	22.8 (73.0)	26.2 (79.2)	26.6 (79.9)	21.9 (71.4)	14.9 (58.8)	6.2 (43.2)	−0.8 (30.6)	12.2 (54.0)
Daily mean °C (°F)	−7.0 (19.4)	−6.0 (21.2)	−1.4 (29.5)	5.6 (42.1)	12.3 (54.1)	17.0 (62.6)	20.7 (69.3)	21.2 (70.2)	16.4 (61.5)	9.4 (48.9)	2.3 (36.1)	−4.2 (24.4)	7.2 (45.0)
Mean daily minimum °C (°F)	−11.7 (10.9)	−11.8 (10.8)	−6.1 (21.0)	0.2 (32.4)	6.1 (43.0)	12.0 (53.6)	16.4 (61.5)	16.9 (62.4)	11.7 (53.1)	4.4 (39.9)	−1.5 (29.3)	−8.0 (17.6)	2.4 (36.3)
Mean minimum °C (°F)	−21.1 (−6.0)	−20.0 (−4.0)	−15.2 (4.6)	−5.5 (22.1)	0.1 (32.2)	6.2 (43.2)	10.7 (51.3)	11.4 (52.5)	5.0 (41.0)	−1.2 (29.8)	−7.6 (18.3)	−17.0 (1.4)	−22.0 (−7.6)
Record low °C (°F)	−41.0 (−41.8)	−38.3 (−36.9)	−34.1 (−29.4)	−19.0 (−2.2)	−7.1 (19.2)	−1.2 (29.8)	1.0 (33.8)	2.4 (36.3)	−1.8 (28.8)	−8.0 (17.6)	−25.0 (−13.0)	−30.0 (−22.0)	−41.0 (−41.8)
Average precipitation mm (inches)	66.9 (2.63)	54.7 (2.15)	55.0 (2.17)	48.5 (1.91)	66.6 (2.62)	71.4 (2.81)	129.5 (5.10)	152.9 (6.02)	136.3 (5.37)	105.8 (4.17)	114.5 (4.51)	102.4 (4.03)	1,104.4 (43.48)
Average snowfall cm (inches)	125 (49)	97 (38)	80 (31)	15 (5.9)	0 (0)	0 (0)	0 (0)	0 (0)	0 (0)	2 (0.8)	82 (32)	158 (62)	557 (219)
Average precipitation days (≥ 0.5 mm)	22.2	18.6	18.6	14.2	12.1	10.8	11.6	11.9	14.2	16.9	21.4	25.1	197.6
Average snowy days	30.2	26.5	26.0	13.8	1.6	0.0	0.0	0.0	0.0	3.3	20.3	30.1	151.5
Average relative humidity (%)	82	78	73	66	67	73	77	79	79	79	80	83	76
Mean monthly sunshine hours	75.3	96.1	141.3	169.5	197.4	176.5	159.8	154.6	144.7	125.9	67.3	58.1	1,566.5
Source: Japan Meteorological Agency (1991–2020 normals, extremes 1888–present)

Climate data for Etanbetsu, Asahikawa (elevation 140 m, 1991–2020 normals, extremes 1977–present)
Month	Jan	Feb	Mar	Apr	May	Jun	Jul	Aug	Sep	Oct	Nov	Dec	Year
Record high °C (°F)	7.0 (44.6)	11.7 (53.1)	16.1 (61.0)	26.5 (79.7)	33.5 (92.3)	36.1 (97.0)	38.4 (101.1)	37.7 (99.9)	32.0 (89.6)	26.6 (79.9)	19.7 (67.5)	12.6 (54.7)	38.4 (101.1)
Mean daily maximum °C (°F)	−3.6 (25.5)	−2.3 (27.9)	2.2 (36.0)	9.2 (48.6)	17.6 (63.7)	22.0 (71.6)	25.7 (78.3)	25.8 (78.4)	21.4 (70.5)	14.3 (57.7)	5.6 (42.1)	−1.5 (29.3)	11.4 (52.5)
Daily mean °C (°F)	−9.1 (15.6)	−8.4 (16.9)	−3.3 (26.1)	3.1 (37.6)	10.6 (51.1)	15.7 (60.3)	19.8 (67.6)	20.0 (68.0)	15.1 (59.2)	8.0 (46.4)	1.1 (34.0)	−5.7 (21.7)	5.6 (42.1)
Mean daily minimum °C (°F)	−16.3 (2.7)	−16.3 (2.7)	−10.5 (13.1)	−2.9 (26.8)	3.5 (38.3)	9.6 (49.3)	14.6 (58.3)	15.1 (59.2)	9.7 (49.5)	2.6 (36.7)	−3.1 (26.4)	−11.0 (12.2)	−0.4 (31.3)
Record low °C (°F)	−37.1 (−34.8)	−38.1 (−36.6)	−30.6 (−23.1)	−18.6 (−1.5)	−4.8 (23.4)	−1.4 (29.5)	2.5 (36.5)	3.8 (38.8)	−0.5 (31.1)	−7.8 (18.0)	−23.4 (−10.1)	−31.5 (−24.7)	−38.1 (−36.6)
Average precipitation mm (inches)	96.8 (3.81)	78.6 (3.09)	76.0 (2.99)	62.7 (2.47)	80.0 (3.15)	71.1 (2.80)	144.2 (5.68)	158.8 (6.25)	166.9 (6.57)	147.4 (5.80)	165.0 (6.50)	147.4 (5.80)	1,394.9 (54.92)
Average precipitation days (≥ 1.0 mm)	20.8	17.2	17.2	12.3	11.7	10.2	12.0	12.4	14.7	17.1	21.2	24.7	191.5
Mean monthly sunshine hours	54.0	71.0	112.3	154.3	186.1	159.7	152.3	148.5	139.8	113.5	52.4	32.9	1,376.8
Source: Japan Meteorological Agency (1991–2020 normals, extremes 1977–present)

== Demographics ==
Historical population
Year	Pop.	±%
1892	3,481	—
1900	8,729	+150.8%
1910	45,296	+418.9%
1920	54,931	+21.3%
1930	76,541	+39.3%
1940	87,514	+14.3%
1950	123,238	+40.8%
1960	194,621	+57.9%
1970	300,593	+54.5%
1980	352,793	+17.4%
1990	362,453	+2.7%
2000	364,093	+0.5%
2010	353,135	−3.0%
2020	331,951	−6.0%

Per Japanese census data, the population of Asahikawa peaked around the year 2000 and has declined slightly in the decades since.

== Economy ==
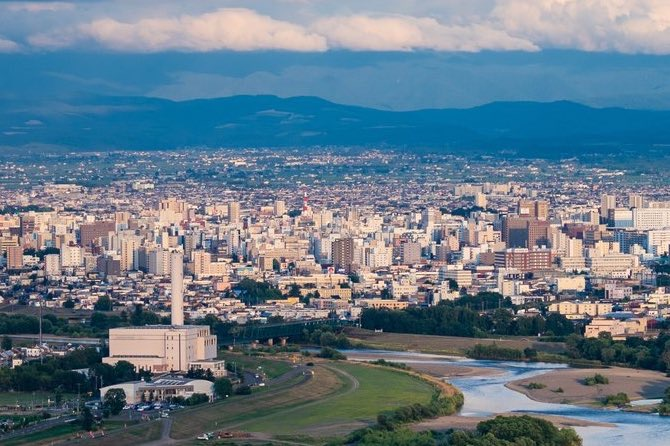
Skyline of Asahikawa City

Asahikawa developed as an industrial center in Hokkaido after World War II. The city is noted for its lumber and brewing industries, as well as the production of furniture and paper pulp.

== Education ==
=== Universities ===
==== National ====
- Asahikawa University
- Asahikawa Medical University
- Hokkaido University of Education, Asahikawa Campus

==== Private ====
- Tokai University (Previously: the Asahikawa Campus of Hokkaido Tokai University)

=== Colleges ===
- Asahikawa National College of Technology

=== High schools ===
==== Public ====
- Hokkaido Asahikawa Agricultural High School (Nogyo)
- Hokkaido Asahikawa Commercial High School (Shogyo)
- Hokkaido Asahikawa Eiryo High school
- Hokkaido Asahikawa Higashi High school
- Hokkaido Asahikawa Kita High School
- Hokkaido Asahikawa Minami High School
- Hokkaido Asahikawa Nishi High School
- Hokkaido Asahikawa Technical High School (Kogyo)

==== Private ====
- Asahikawa Fuji Girls' High School
- Asahikawa Jitsugyo High School
- Asahikawa Meisei High School
- Asahikawa Ryukoku High School
- Asahikawa Tosei High School
- Asahikawa University High School
- Ikegami Gakuen High School, Asahikawa Campus

== Transportation ==
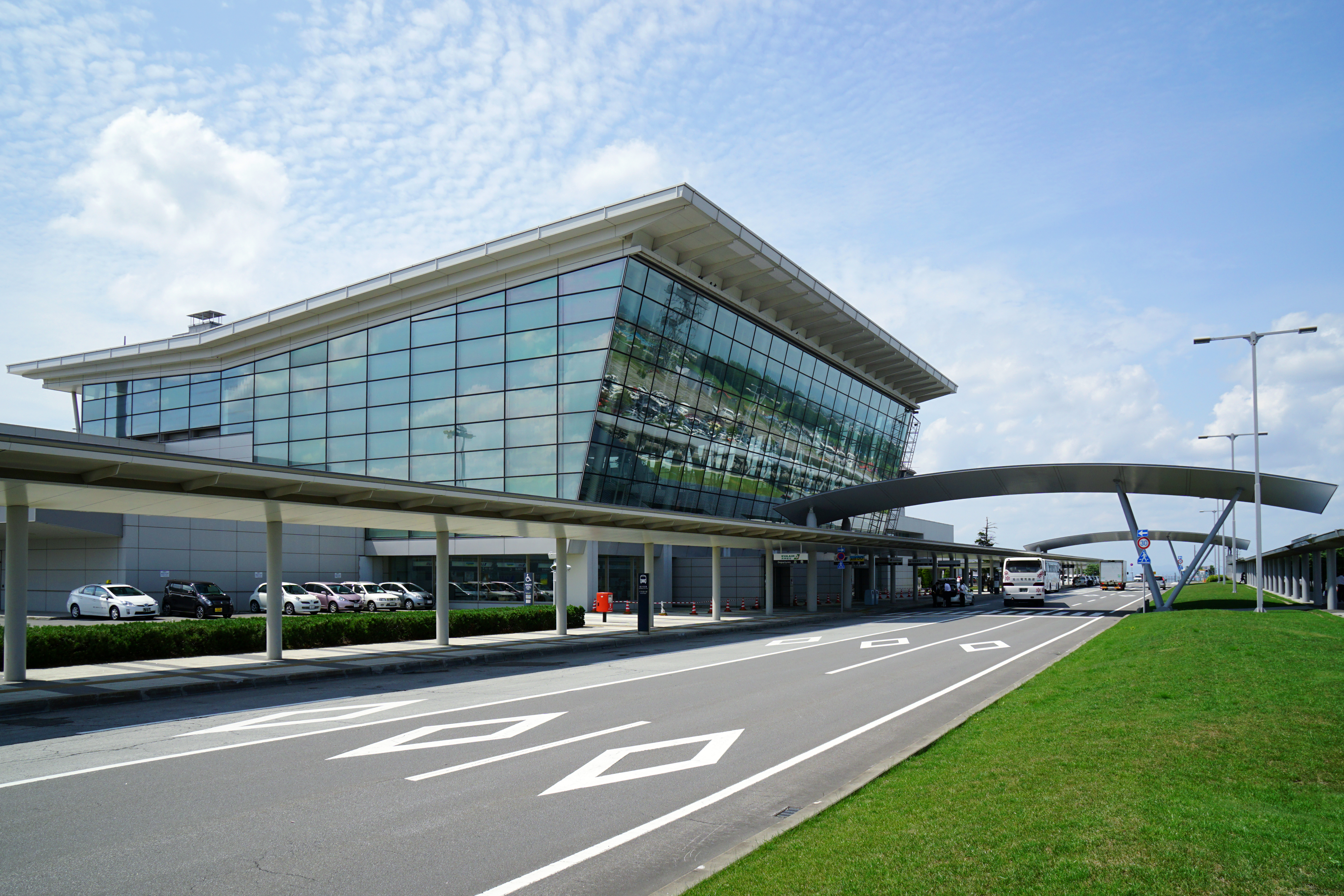
Asahikawa Airport

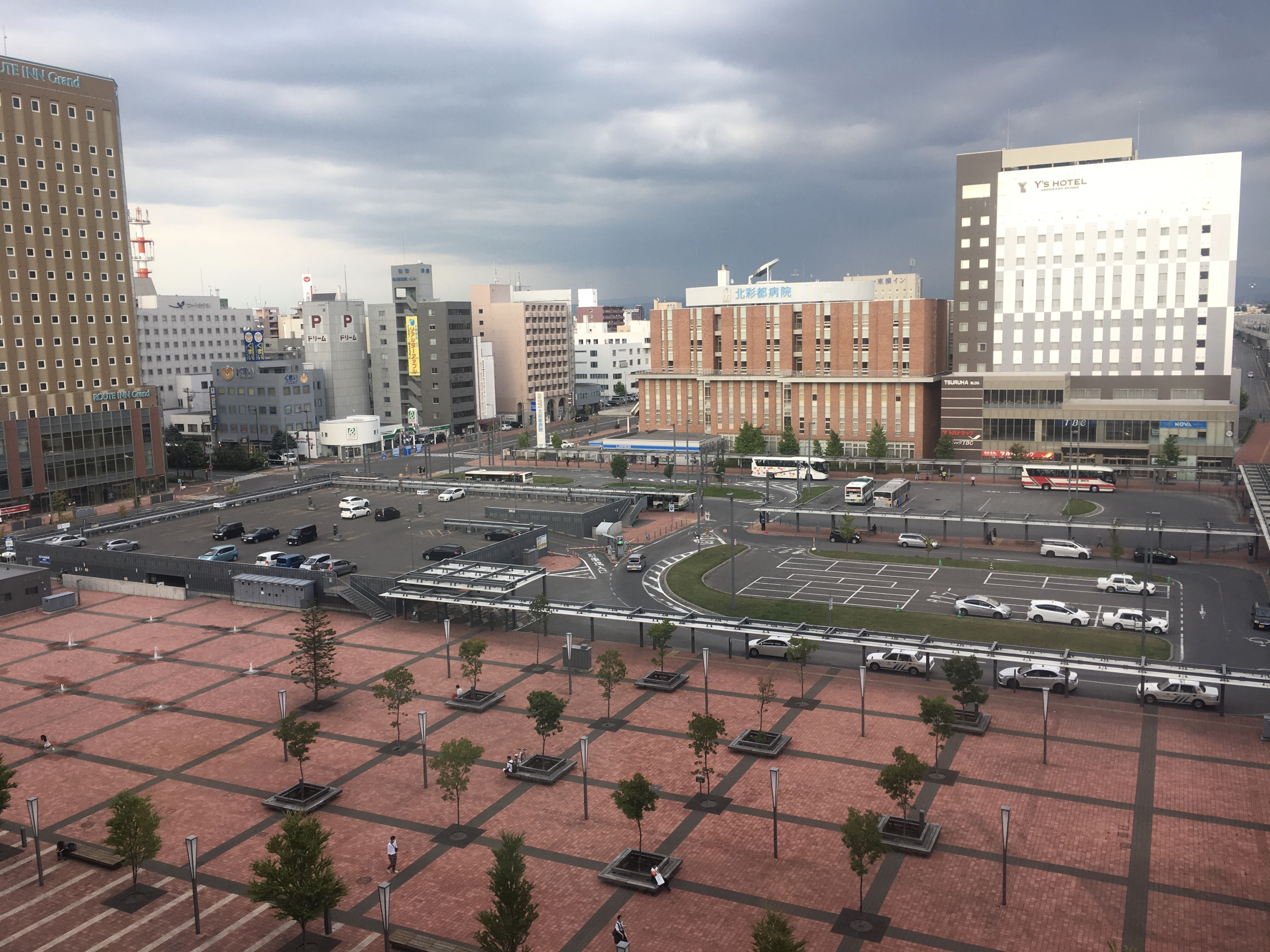
Asahikawa Station-North-Entrance

=== Airport ===
Asahikawa is served by Asahikawa Airport which stretches over the outskirts of Asahikawa City and Higashikagura, Hokkaido. The airport was first proposed by the Asahikawa City Council in 1955, opened in 1961, and daily flights to Tokyo started in 1970. The present terminal of Asahikawa Airport opened in 2000. It is a second class airport, and also a single-runway regional airport. It serves domestic destinations including Tokyo, but some airlines offer destinations in South Korea. EVA Air added Asahikawa as a destination from Taipei on May 2, 2013.

=== Rail ===
Asahikawa is one of the major rail hubs of Hokkaido. The Hakodate Main Line connects Asahikawa to Hakodate in the south of Hokkaido, and the Sōya Main Line connects Asahikawa with Wakkanai at the north of Hokkaido. The Sekihoku Main Line connects the city with Abashiri on the Sea of Okhotsk. The Furano Line connects Abashiri with nearby Biei and Furano.

JR Hokkaido

- Hakodate Main Line：- Asahikawa–Chikabumi
- Sōya Main Line：- Asahikawa–Asahikawa-Yojō–Shin-Asahikawa–Nagayama–Kita-Nagayama
- Sekihoku Main Line：- Shin-Asahikawa–Minami-Nagayama–Higashi-Asahikawa–Sakuraoka
- Furano Line: Asahikawa–Kaguraoka–Midorigaoka–Nishi-Goryō–Nishi-Mizuho–Nishi-Kagura–Nishi-Seiwa–Chiyogaoka

=== Bus ===
Buses, run by two private companies, also serve the city.

- Asahikawa Denkikidou
- Dohoku Bus

== Specialties ==
- Asahikawa Ramen
- Asahikawa furniture
- Confectionery
- Sake (Otokoyama, Takasago, Taisetsunokura)
- Taisetsu Microbrew Beer "Taisetsu ji-beer"
- Asahikawa mutton barbecue "Genghis Khan"
- Asahikawa pork barbecue "Shio-Horumon"
- Asahikawa chicken barbecue "Shinko-yaki"
- Pottery/wooden handiwork (Arashiyama area)
- Sushi and Seafood

== Sightseeing ==
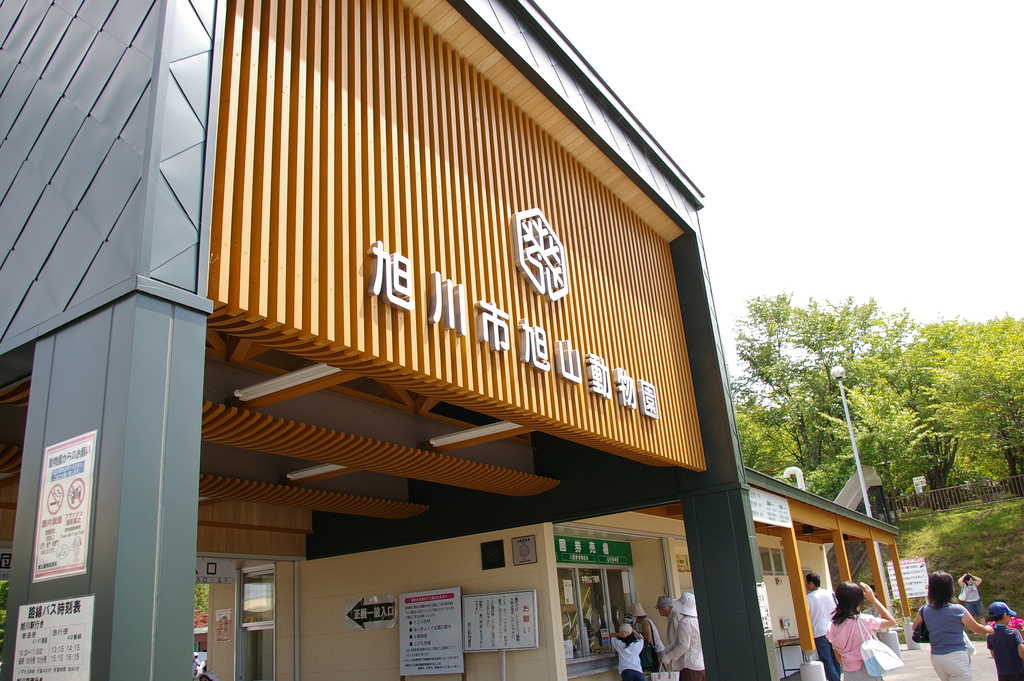
Asahiyama Zoo

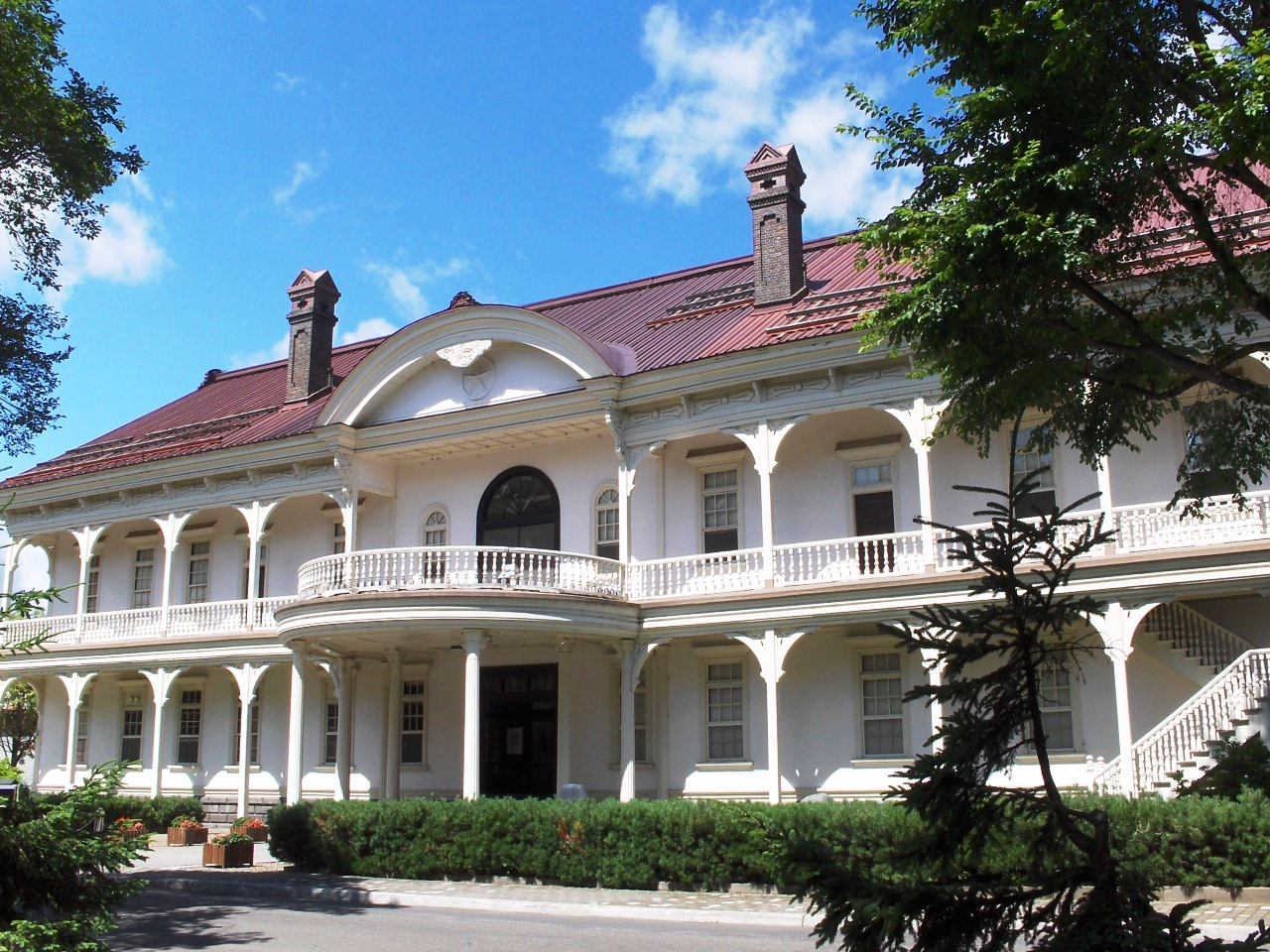
Asahikawa Museum of Sculpture in Honor of Teijiro Nakahara

- Asahiyama Zoo
- Ski Resorts (Kamui Ski Links, Santa Present Park, Pippu Ski Area, Canmore Ski Village etc.) - "Hokkaido Powder Belt"
- Ueno Farm (Hokkaido Garden Path)
- Asahikawa Winter Festival/Illuminations (February)
- Asahikawa Station Building
- Arashiyama Pottery village
- Asahibashi Bridge
- Asahikawa Furniture Center
- Asahikawa Kitasaito Garden
- Asahikawa Museum of Sculpture in Honor of Teijiro Nakahara
- Asahikawa Youth Science Museum "Saiparu"
- Ayako Miura Memorial Literature Center
- Hoppo Wild Flower Garden, famous for Erythronium japonicum (Dogtooth violet) that flower in May
- Hokkaido Traditional Art Craft Village
- Kamikawa Shrine
- Mount Tossho, also famous for Erythronium japonicum
- Otokoyama Sake Brewing Museum
- Romantic Road (tree tunnel and churches)
- Yasushi Inoue Memorial Center

== Mascots ==
Asappy and Yukkirin, the town's mascots

Asahikawa's mascots are Asappy (あさっぴー, Asappī) and Yukkirin (ゆっきりん).

- Asappy is a mixture of a harbor seal and a polar bear. He wears a shirt designed after Daisetsuzan National Park with fringes that resembled ramen, his belt is designed after the Asahi Bridge and his pants were designed after the Ishikari River. His red scarf shows his status as a hero.
- Yukkirin is a strong but kind snow giraffe (technically a kirin). Her dress has an apple, a snowflake and a flower motif. She wears Etanbetsu boots with fringes. Her antennae resemble snowballs. She can use them to gather information.

== Sister and friendship cities ==
=== Sister cities ===
- Bloomington, Illinois, United States
- Normal, Illinois, United States
- Suwon, Gyeonggi-do, South Korea

=== Friendship cities ===
- Yuzhno-Sakhalinsk, Sakhalin Oblast, Russia
- Harbin, Heilongjiang, China

== Notable people ==
- Asa Ando, alpine skier
- Takeshi Aono, voice actor
- Miura Ayako, author
- Haruhisa Chiba, skier
- Yuko Emoto, judo wrestler
- Kazuhiro Fujita, manga artist
- Nanami Hashimoto, idol
- Yasushi Inoue, author
- Kiyomi Kato, wrestler
- Kitanofuji Katsuaki, sumo wrestler
- Shigeo Nakata, wrestler
- Ikumi Narita, volleyball player
- Victor Starffin, baseball player
- Taizō Sugimura, politician
- Bikki Sunazawa, sculptor and painter
- Kentaro Suzuki, football player
- Koyo Takahashi, basketball player
- Tomoka Takeuchi, snowboarder
- Kōji Tamaki, lead vocalist of Anzen Chitai
- Buichi Terasawa, manga artist
- Masae Ueno, judo wrestler
- Yoshie Ueno, judo wrestler
- Miho Yabe, actress
- Megumi Yabushita, mixed martial artist, kickboxer, professional wrestler and judoka
- Shōgō Yasumura, comedian
- Camellia (Masaya Ōya), electronic musician and record producer
