= Yasushi Inoue =

Japanese writer (1907–1991)

Yasushi Inoue 井上 靖
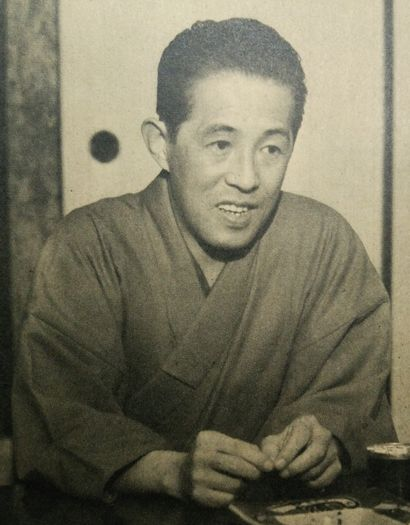
- Yasushi Inoue in 1955
- Born: Yasushi Inoue; May 6, 1907; Asahikawa, Hokkaido, Japan
- Died: January 29, 1991 (aged 83); Tokyo, Japan
- Education: Kyoto University
- Occupation: Writer
- Spouse: Fumiko Adachi (m. 1935)
- Children: Shuichi Inoue (son)
- Writing career
- Period: 1930–1991

Yasushi Inoue (井上靖, Inoue Yasushi; May 6, 1907 – January 29, 1991) was a Japanese writer of novels, short stories, poetry and essays, noted for his historical and autobiographical fiction. His most acclaimed works include The Bullfight (Tōgyū, 1949), The Roof Tile of Tempyō (Tenpyō no iraka, 1957), and Tun-huang (Tonkō, 1959).

== Biography ==
Inoue was born into a family of physicians in Asahikawa, Hokkaido, in 1907, and later raised in Yugashima, Izu, Shizuoka Prefecture. In his essay "Hometown Izu", he wrote, "I was born in Asahikawa, Hokkaido, but in the yearbooks and directories, most of my birthplace is Shizuoka Prefecture. When I write it myself, I write it separately from Asahikawa as my place of birth and Shizuoka Prefecture as my birthplace". In "My History of Self-Formation", he wrote, "It seems safe to assume that Izu, where I spent my childhood, was my true hometown, and that everything that would form the basis of my person was created here."

During his high school years, Inoue practiced judo. He first studied law and literature at Kyushu University, then switched to philosophy at Kyoto University, from which he graduated in 1936 with a degree in aesthetics and a thesis on Paul Valéry. After winning the Chiba Kameo Prize for Ryūten, Inoue started working for Mainichi Shimbun. He was drafted into the Second Sino-Japanese War in 1937 but soon returned due to illness and resumed working at Mainichi Shimbun. His military service in northern China sparked his interest in Chinese history.

After the Pacific War, Inoue won critical acclaim with his 1949 novellas The Hunting Gun (Ryōjū) and The Bullfight. The latter won the Akutagawa Prize. He then published several novels and short stories in various genres: contemporary love stories, stories addressing social and political aspects of postwar Japan, such as Kuroi Ushio, historical novels with accurately depicted settings, such as The Roof Tile of Tempyō (1957) and Tun-huang (Tonkō, 1959), and autobiographical works such as Chronicle of My Mother (Waga haha no ki, 1975), which depicts his mother's decline into senility.

Inoue was elected a member of the Japan Art Academy in 1964 and received the Order of Culture in 1976. He died in Tokyo in 1991, aged 83.

== Selected works ==
- 1937: Ryūten (流転) story
- 1949: The Hunting Gun (猟銃, Ryōjū) novella
- 1949: The Bullfight (闘牛, Tōgyū) novella
- 1950: Kuroi Ushio (黯い潮) novel
- 1950: Shi to koi to nami (死と恋と波と) short-story collection
- 1951: Life of a Counterfeiter (ある偽作家の生涯, Aru gisakka no shōgai) short story collection
- 1953: Asunaro monogatari (あすなろ物語) novel
- 1956: Hyōheki (氷壁) novel
- 1957: The Roof Tile of Tempyō (天平の甍, Tenpyō no iraka) novel
- 1958: Kitaguni (北国) poetry collection
- 1959: Lou-Lan (楼蘭, Ro-ran) short-story collection
- 1959: Tun-huang (敦煌, Tonkō) novel
- 1960: Yodo dono no nikki (淀どの日記) novel
- 1962: Chikūkai (地中海) poetry collection
- 1963: Wind and Waves (風濤, Fūtō) novel
- 1967: Kaseki (化石) novel
- 1967: Unga (運河) poetry collection
- 1968: Oroshiyakoku suimutan (おろしや国酔夢譚) novel
- 1969: Journey Beyond Samarkand (西域物語, Seiiki monogatari) novel
- 1971: Kisetsu (季節) poetry collection
- 1975: Chronicle of My Mother (わが母の記, Waga haha no ki) novel
- 1976: Enseiro (遠征路) poetry collection
- 1979: Zen shishū (全詩集) poetry collection
- 1981: Hongakubō ibun (本覺坊遺文) novel
- 1989: Confucius (孔子, Kōshi) novel

== Awards ==
- 1936: Chiba Kameo Prize for Ryūten
- 1950: Akutagawa Prize for The Bullfight
- 1957: Ministry of Education, Culture, Sports, Science and Technology Award for The Roof Tile of Tempyo
- 1959: Mainichi Press Prize for Tun-huang
- 1959: Japan Art Academy Award for Hyōheki
- 1961: Noma Literary Prize for Yodo dono no nikki
- 1963: Yomiuri Prize for Wind and Waves
- 1969: Japanese Literature Grand Prix for Oroshiyakoku suimutan
- 1976: Order of Culture
- 1980: Kikuchi Kan Prize
- 1984: Asahi Prize
- 1989: Noma Literary Prize for Confucius

== Adaptations (selected) ==
Films

- 1954: Kuroi Ushio, directed by Sō Yamamura
- 1955: Asunaro monogatari, directed by Hiromichi Horikawa
- 1961: Ryōjū, directed by Heinosuke Gosho
- 1972: Kaseki, directed by Masaki Kobayashi
- 1989: Sen no Rikyū: Honkakubō ibun, directed by Kei Kumai
- 2012: Waga no haha no ki, directed by Masato Harada

Many of Inoue's works have also been adapted for television and the stage.
