= Haguroiwa Tomomi =

Japanese sumo wrestler (1946–2016)

Personal information
- Native name: 羽黒岩 盟海
- Born: Tomojiro Toda; 30 June 1946 Nobeoka, Miyazaki, Japan
- Died: 23 October 2016 (aged 70)
- Height: 1.77 m (5 ft 9 1/2 in)
- Weight: 128 kg (282 lb)

Sport
- Sport: Sumo
- Retired: January, 1978
- Heya: Tatsunami
- Record: 626-624-42
- Debut: May, 1961
- Highest rank: Komusubi (May, 1973)
- Elder name: Ikazuchi
- Special Prizes: Fighting Spirit (1)
- Gold Stars: 2 (Taihō, Kashiwado)
- Updated on June 2020

Tomojiro Toda (30 June 1946 – 23 October 2016), known as Haguroiwa Tomomi, was a sumo wrestler from Nobeoka, Miyazaki, Japan. He made his professional debut in May 1961, and reached the top division in January 1967. His highest rank was komusubi. He withdrew from active competition in January 1978 and remained in the Japan Sumo Association as an elder under the name Ikazuchi. He reached the mandatory retirement age of 65, and left the Sumo Association in June 2011.

== Career ==
He left junior high school and joined Tatsunami stable in May 1961 at the age of 14. He made his debut alongside future sekiwake Fujinokawa, and future maegashira Tochifuji and Wakanoumi. He reached the second highest juryo division in November 1965, and in January 1967 he became the first wrestler from Miyazaki Prefecture to reach the top division for 116 years, the previous being Tomozuna Ryosuke in 1851. He won his first (and only) special prize in the January 1969 tournament, for Fighting Spirit.

Haguroiwa is best remembered for his feat in the March tournament of 1969 when (still competing under his family name of Toda) he ended the 45 bout winning streak of yokozuna Taihō, which was a postwar record at the time. This was the first kinboshi of his career. However, it caused controversy because the bout had initially been awarded to Taihō by the referee before the judges intervened and reversed his decision, but photographs published in newspapers the next day suggested that Toda had stepped out first and Taihō should have been given the victory after all. This embarrassment was called the "Error of the Century", and it led to the Sumo Association introducing instant replay to assist judges in future decisions.

He had one other victory over a yokozuna, defeating Kashiwado in May 1969. He switched to the Haguroiwa shikona in January 1971. In May 1973 he reached his highest rank of komusubi, but scored only two wins against thirteen losses. He never reached the sanyaku ranks again. He had an excellent record against Takanohana Kenshi, beating him nine times and losing just three times, and even after Takanohana became an ozeki he beat him three times out of four. He suffered a neck injury in a match against Masudayama in July 1977 which led to him dropping to the juryo division, and he announced his retirement in January 1978. He had fought in the top division for 55 tournaments, with a record of 385 wins, 427 losses and 13 absences.

== Retirement from sumo ==
Following his retirement he became an elder in the Japan Sumo Association under the name Ikazuchi Oyakata. He worked as a coach at Tatsunami stable and was also a member of the judging committee. He reached the mandatory retirement age of 65 in June 2011.

Tomomi died of kidney failure on 23 October 2016 at the age of 70.

== Career record ==
Haguroiwa Tomomi
Year	January Hatsu basho, Tokyo	March Haru basho, Osaka	May Natsu basho, Tokyo	July Nagoya basho, Nagoya	September Aki basho, Tokyo	November Kyūshū basho, Fukuoka
1961	x	x	(Maezumo)	East Jonokuchi #33; 4–3	West Jonidan #76; 5–2	West Jonidan #11; Sat out due to injury 0–0–7
1962	West Jonidan #55; 5–2	East Jonidan #23; 2–5	East Jonidan #41; 6–1	East Sandanme #75; 2–5	East Jonidan #3; 4–3	East Sandanme #80; 5–2
1963	East Sandanme #49; 6–1	West Sandanme #4; 2–5	East Sandanme #27; 4–3	East Sandanme #14; 4–3	West Makushita #95; 4–3	East Makushita #84; 5–2
1964	West Makushita #63; 4–3	West Makushita #57; 5–2	West Makushita #40; 4–3	West Makushita #36; 4–3	West Makushita #30; 3–4	East Makushita #35; 5–2
1965	East Makushita #23; 5–2	East Makushita #13; 4–3	West Makushita #8; 4–3	East Makushita #6; 5–2	East Makushita #2; 6–1	West Jūryō #17; 8–7
1966	West Jūryō #16; 8–7	East Jūryō #14; 8–7	West Jūryō #11; 8–7	East Jūryō #9; 8–7	West Jūryō #4; 8–7	West Jūryō #2; 11–4
1967	West Maegashira #12; 6–9	West Maegashira #15; 9–6	East Maegashira #11; 7–8	East Maegashira #11; 9–6	East Maegashira #9; 6–9	West Maegashira #10; 6–9
1968	West Jūryō #1; 9–6	East Maegashira #11; 8–7	West Maegashira #9; 6–9	East Maegashira #11; 8–7	West Maegashira #7; 7–8	West Maegashira #10; 9–6
1969	East Maegashira #7; 11–4; F	East Maegashira #1; 7–8 ★	West Maegashira #2; 8–7 ★	West Maegashira #1; 6–9	East Maegashira #3; 7–8	West Maegashira #3; 5–10
1970	East Maegashira #8; 6–9	East Maegashira #10; 8–7	East Maegashira #7; 6–9	West Maegashira #9; 9–6	West Maegashira #2; 5–10	West Maegashira #6; 7–8
1971	West Maegashira #9; 10–5	East Maegashira #2; 5–8–2	East Maegashira #6; 7–8	East Maegashira #7; 8–7	West Maegashira #3; 6–9	East Maegashira #6; 6–9
1972	East Maegashira #8; 7–8	West Maegashira #9; 7–8	East Maegashira #11; 7–8	West Maegashira #12; 8–7	East Maegashira #11; 8–7	East Maegashira #9; 10–5
1973	West Maegashira #2; 7–8	East Maegashira #3; 9–6	East Komusubi #1; 2–13	East Maegashira #9; 8–7	West Maegashira #6; 6–9	West Maegashira #8; 6–9
1974	West Maegashira #11; 8–7	East Maegashira #10; 8–7	East Maegashira #7; 8–7	West Maegashira #2; 8–7	East Maegashira #2; 4–11	West Maegashira #9; 4–11
1975	West Jūryō #2; 6–9	East Jūryō #5; 5–10	East Jūryō #11; 10–5	West Jūryō #3; 7–8	East Jūryō #5; 7–8	East Jūryō #7; 8–7
1976	West Jūryō #3; 9–6	East Jūryō #1; 8–7	West Maegashira #13; 8–7	West Maegashira #10; 8–7	East Maegashira #8; 6–9	East Maegashira #10; 8–7
1977	East Maegashira #7; 6–9	West Maegashira #11; 9–6	East Maegashira #6; 6–9	East Maegashira #9; 1–3–11	East Jūryō #6; Sat out due to injury 0–0–15	East Jūryō #6; 5–10
1978	West Jūryō #13; Retired; 1–7	x	x	x	x	x
Record given as wins–losses–absences Top division champion Top division runner-up Retired Lower divisions Non-participation Sanshō key: F=Fighting spirit; O=Outstanding performance; T=Technique Also shown: ★=Kinboshi; P=Playoff(s); Divisions: Makuuchi — Jūryō — Makushita — Sandanme — Jonidan — Jonokuchi Makuuchi ranks: Yokozuna — Ōzeki — Sekiwake — Komusubi — Maegashira

== See also ==
- Glossary of sumo terms
- List of past sumo wrestlers
- List of komusubi
