= Masateru =

- Gender: Male

Origin
- Origin: Japanese
- Meaning: Different meanings depending on the kanji used

Masateru (written: 將晃, 政輝 or 正照) is a masculine Japanese given name. Notable people with the name include:

- Masateru Akita (秋田 政輝) (born 1982), Japanese footballer
- Kaiketsu Masateru (魁傑 將晃) (born 1948), Japanese sumo wrestler
- Wakanoumi Masateru II (若ノ海 正照) (1945–1995), Japanese sumo wrestler
