= Judge (sumo) =

Ringside judges in sumo

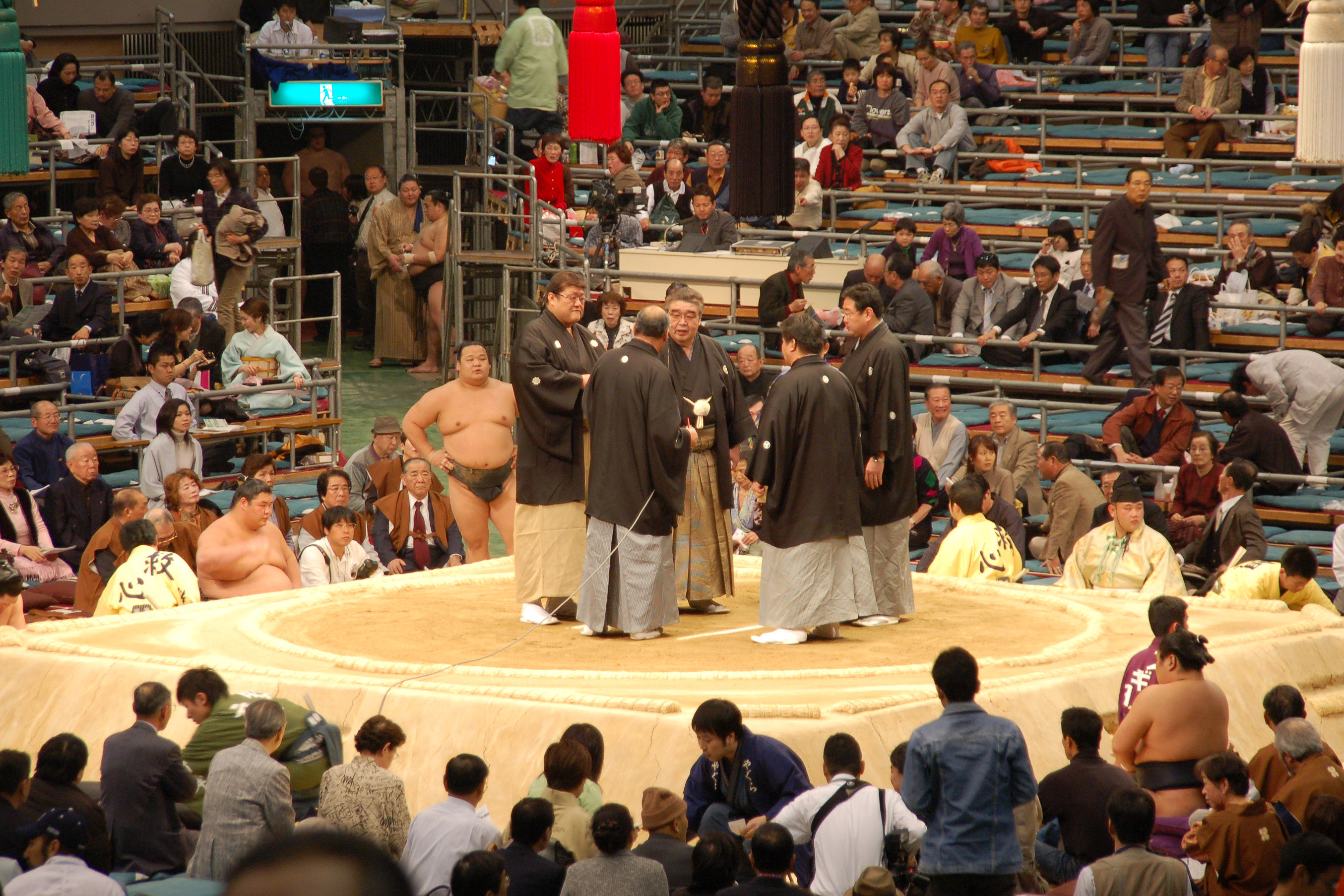
Judges holding a mono-ii during the 2006 March tournament.

In sumo wrestling, a shimpan or shinpan (審判) is a ringside judge seated around the dohyō (sumo ring) to observe the match, identifying which wrestler wins the match and supervising the work of the in-ring referee (called gyōji) to ensure that no refereeing errors are made.

Historically, the role of judge developed in the 18th century to facilitate arbitral decisions, which were subject to external pressures, before establishing itself as the ultimate decision-making authority at the end of the 19th century. In professional sumo, all judges are former wrestlers who have acquired the status of toshiyori (sumo elder) and have been assigned to the corresponding department within the Japan Sumo Association. During sumo tournaments (called honbasho), five judges sit around the dohyō, with additional elders serving as video review officials in another room. The judges command an aura of respect, reinforced by their formal, sober attire and the weight of their decisions.

The judges' main role is to ensure that all preparations for the matches are completed properly and on time, before assisting both the referee in the ring in deciding the outcome of a match and the referees on announcing duty in recording the winning techniques. If the outcome of a match is disputed, it is up to the judges to call a mono-ii to discuss the referee's decision, assisted by video refereeing.

The role of judges is not limited to matches. Behind the scenes, they are also responsible for establishing the banzuke, the ranking system that serves as the cornerstone of professional sumo. When wrestlers are eligible for promotion to the two highest ranks in the hierarchy (yokozuna and ōzeki), it is also their responsibility to ask the Sumo Association's board of directors to promote those selected, with their opinion serving as the basis for the promotion process and their recommendations never being ignored. Judges also serve as guardians of the etiquette associated with professional sumo, and it is their responsibility to enforce the rules and reprimand wrestlers and masters who violate them. Finally, they are responsible for organizing the matches, a role they perform every day of a tournament.

== History ==
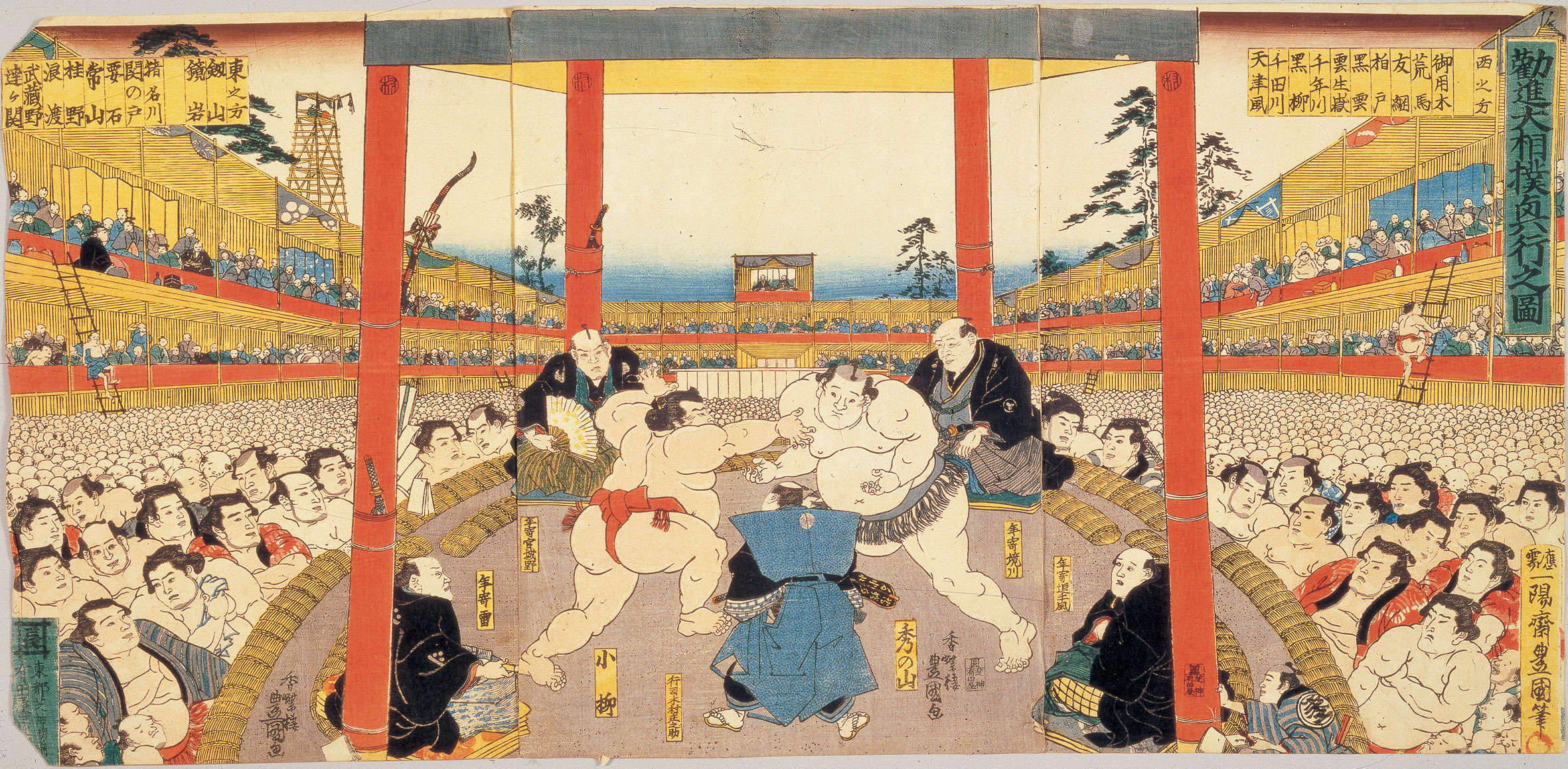
The four original naka aratame were initially positioned on the ring, at its ends under the poles.

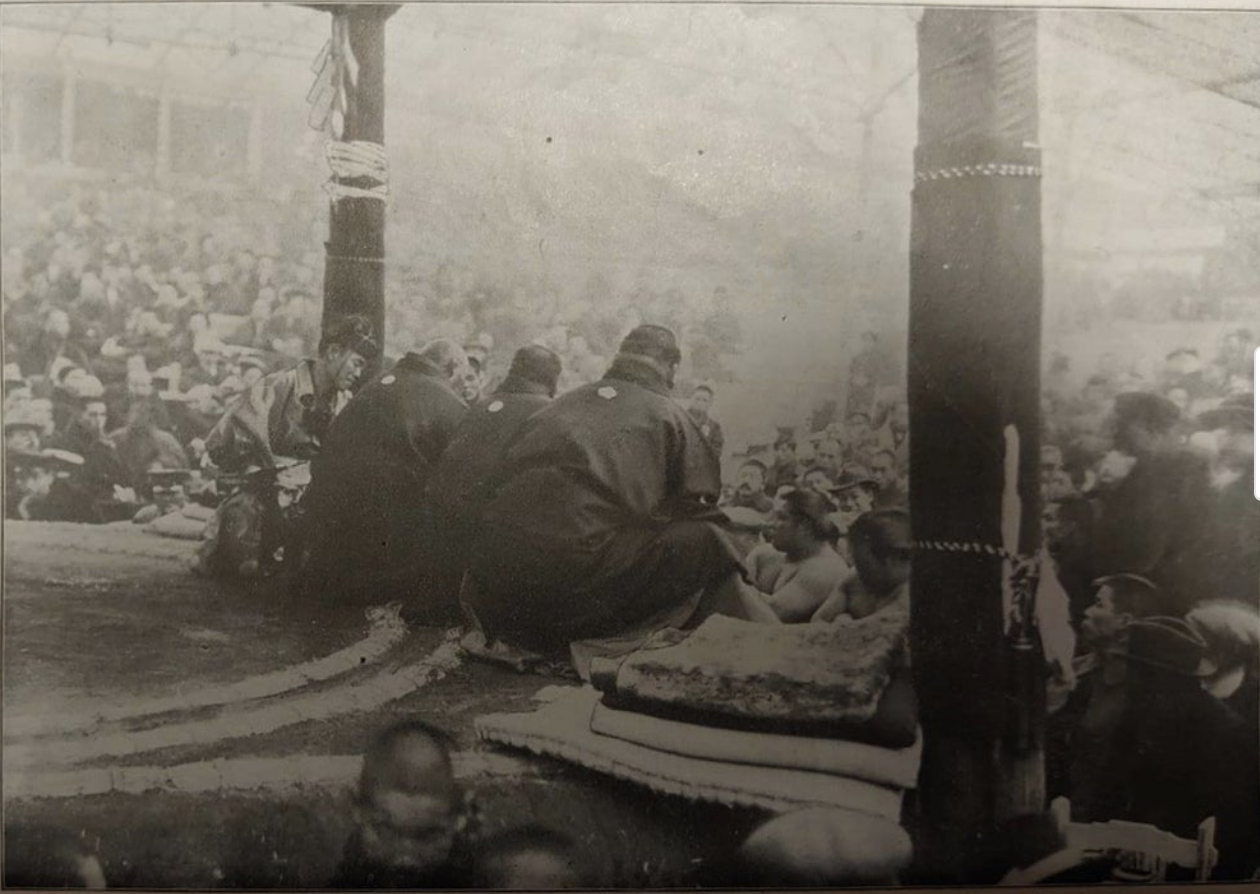
Kensayaku debating a mono-ii call in 1919.

The elders' judging function developed around 1750, with the emergence of interests linked to the prestige of local lords. The fairness of the decisions handed down by the gyōji was increasingly called into question by the nobility, because lords sponsored wrestlers. This led to the questioning of the gyōji's absolute authority over match results and the introduction of a system of judges, all elders, then called naka aratame (中改; ascertainers in the middle) but more commonly known as shihon bashira (四本柱; lit. 'four pillars'). This name was derived from their positions during matches, right at the base of the poles holding up the roof of the ring. Initially, the judges sat at the foot of the ring, but from around 1780 onwards, they took their places directly on the fighting platform. Three judges were led by a head judge, who had total authority and whose personal decision could not be questioned.

In 1873, the Tokyo Sumo Association faced its first wave of complaints from wrestlers. Leading the first of these movements, the wrestler Takasago Uragorō petitioned the association for a number of reforms. After the association rejected these demands, Takasago formed his own troupe, which became a rival to the Tokyo association before merging back with it in 1878, after some of the demands had been addressed. One of these was to transfer the final say in the judgment of a disputed match from the gyōji to the judges. The judges took on the official name of kensayaku (検査役; inspectors). The office of judge evolved in the mid-20th century, with the removal of the powers of the head judge in 1958, considered too powerful and autocratic. In late 1968, a final reform was implemented after widespread criticism highlighted the insularity and conflicts of interest among coaches accused of protecting their apprentices at the expense of the smooth running of the matches. Judges finally adopted the name shimpan (or shimpan-iin). The system for electing judges that had been in place until then was also abolished in favor of the system that remains in place today. Instead, a department system was implemented in which judges operated in a semi-independent way under the authority of a chairman and his deputy. The idea of bringing in judges who were not toshiyori but former wrestlers who showed little promise, retired and trained by their peers to become judges following the gyōji system, was considered but not implemented.

== Status and seating ==
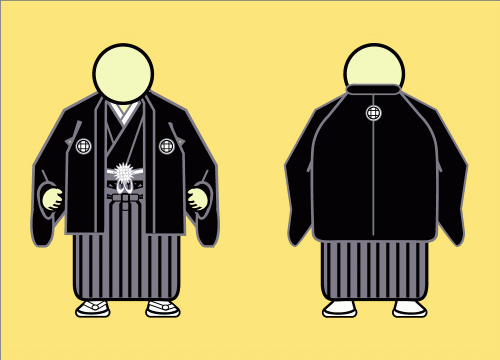
The formal shimpan costume.

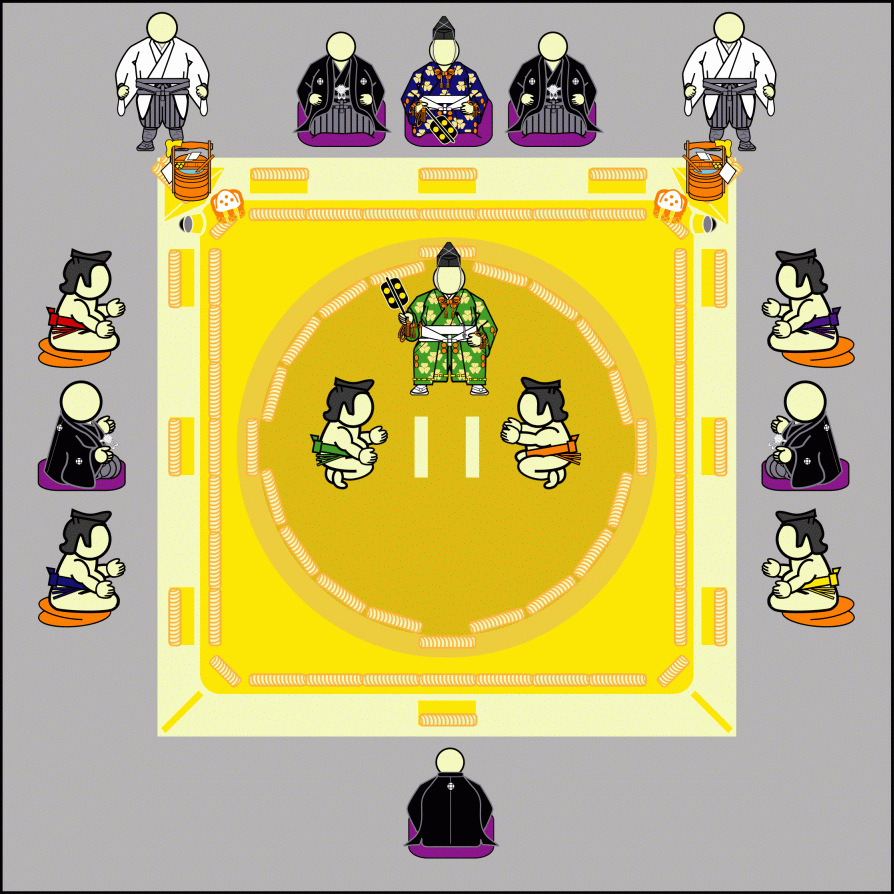
Layout and placement of sumo participants around a dohyō.

All judges are former wrestlers who have attained the status of toshiyori and have been assigned to the dedicated department of the Japan Sumo Association. Like all departments, the Judging Department is headed by a director assisted by a deputy. Starting with the 2020 March tournament, two toshiyori, with the status of director and deputy, are also attached to the department to focus solely on match scheduling and banzuke decisions. They will generally not serve as judges during matches, but will act as substitutes if the heads of the departments are unable to perform their role. The appointed toshiyori serve in the department for a one-year term, and their supervisors serve for a two-year term.

The number of judges is set at twenty-three, and places are distributed equitably among the various ichimon, or clans, within the association. During a match, five judges sit around the ring, each belonging to a different clan.

During an official match, the judges are distributed around the four sides of the ring (east, south, west and north). The chief judge, called the shimpan-buchō, is always seated on the north side (on the place of honor known as the shomen). The other judges share the other three corners of the ring, with two judges sitting together on the southern edge bordering the hanamichi (referred to as mukō jōmen), flanking the gyōji who awaits his turn to officiate at the foot of the dohyō.

Within the Japan Sumo Association (JSA), judges are held in high regard, being nicknamed the hanagata (花形; star) of sumo. This is because their role allows them to be the visible to the general public, appearing on television and at ringside during tournaments. Their status is considered prestigious within the various departments of the Sumo Association, with the judges themselves are regarded as fair and honorable men. All judges are recognizable by their sober and formal attire, called montsuki. The JSA itself requires its judges to wear these robes, strictly prohibiting activities around the ring in simple yukata or business suits in order to protect the traditional appearance of sumo tournaments. Judges wear black haori (loose jackets) and gray silk shirts, setting them apart from the flamboyant robes of the gyōji, and often causing them to be nicknamed "the Men in black". A notable exception to this rule was when the association celebrated its centenary in 2025, with judges dressed in court ritual attire inspired by the Heian period.

It is not frowned upon for a judge to be involved in the matches of his own students, contrary to what might be expected in light of ethical rules regarding conflicts of interest. The press regularly reports on the reactions of the coaches, particularly by analyzing their reactions after a match involving a student.

== Duties ==
=== Mono-ii ===
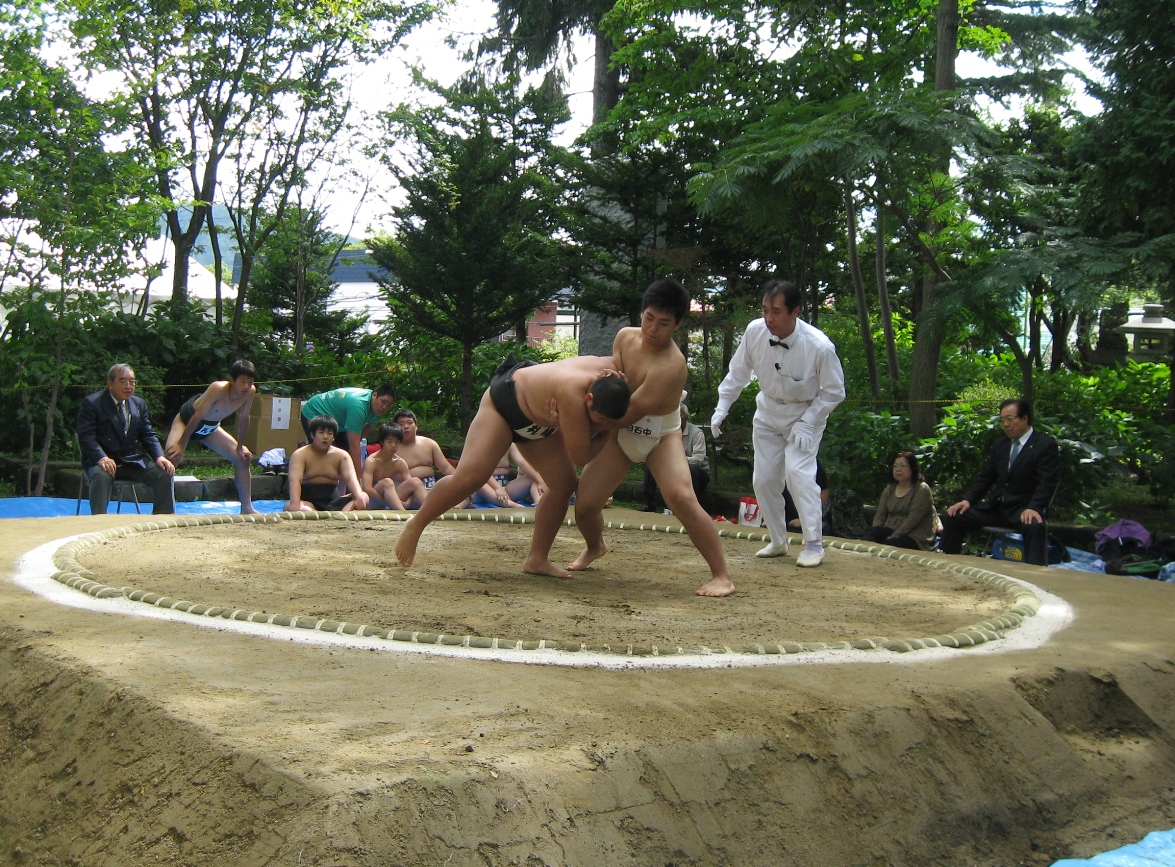
Judges (in suits and seated) are also present at amateur tournaments.

In the event of a disputed result, the shimpan can challenge the gyōji's decision by calling in a mono-ii (物言い; lit. 'talking it over'). When doing so, they correspond through an earpiece to a video review room, managed by either a single judge (for lower division matches) or two (for matches involving sekitori). Judges have used replays since the 1969 May tournament, after yokozuna Taihō was wrongly declared the loser in his match against Toda during the 1969 March Tournament, ending his streak of consecutive victories. Taihō was initially pushed to the edge of the ring before stepping out. However, he was declared the winner because the referee had seen Toda's foot leave the ring before Taihō's. After a protest by the judges, the decision was overturned, and Taihō lost the match by oshidashi ('frontal push out'). The next day, the press published several front-page photos of the match's conclusion that clearly showed that Toda's foot had left the ring before Taihō. The controversy, dubbed the "miscall of the century", prompted the Japan Sumo Association to make video refereeing standard practice. The introduction of video refereeing was a pioneering move in Japanese sports, contrasting with the very traditional nature and setting of sumo.

Judges can confirm the decision of the gyōji by announcing gunbai-dōri (軍配通り; lit. 'way of the gunbai'), overturn it by announcing gunbai-sashichigae (軍配差し違え; lit. 'gunbai mistake'), or order a torinaoshi (取り直し; rematch). The decision supported by the judges is subject to a majority vote by the members present before being announced to the public. The chief judge then acts as spokesman. Unlike gyōji, whose careers are affected if they make too many bad judgments, judges are not affected if they make a bad decision after a controversial match. In the rare case of a judging error, a rematch (torinaoshi) can be called. In a top division match between Kotozakura and Atamifuji at the 2025 January tournament, judge Asahiyama (former sekiwake Kotonishiki) raised his hand to stop the contest, believing that Kotozakura's foot stepped out of the dohyō. Video replays confirmed that the foot did not touch the ground outside of the straw bales at the time the hand was raised, and the judges decided to order a rematch.

The accuracy of the judges' decision after a mono-ii on the spot is never questioned. Its legitimacy is partly based on the fact that, with all sides of the ring covered by the judges, they have a better view of what is happening in the ring than the referee, who will always have a blind spot.

In amateur sumo, the use of video refereeing has also become more widespread since the 2020s, following a series of controversial decisions at the highest level of national competition, with the use of tablet computers.

=== Around and during the matches ===
The judges are divided into seven teams that take turns throughout the day, with two teams dedicated solely to the makuuchi division, switching places when half of the matches of that division have been completed. Within the teams, sekitori matches will always be presided over by a chief judge who will be either the department director or his deputy.

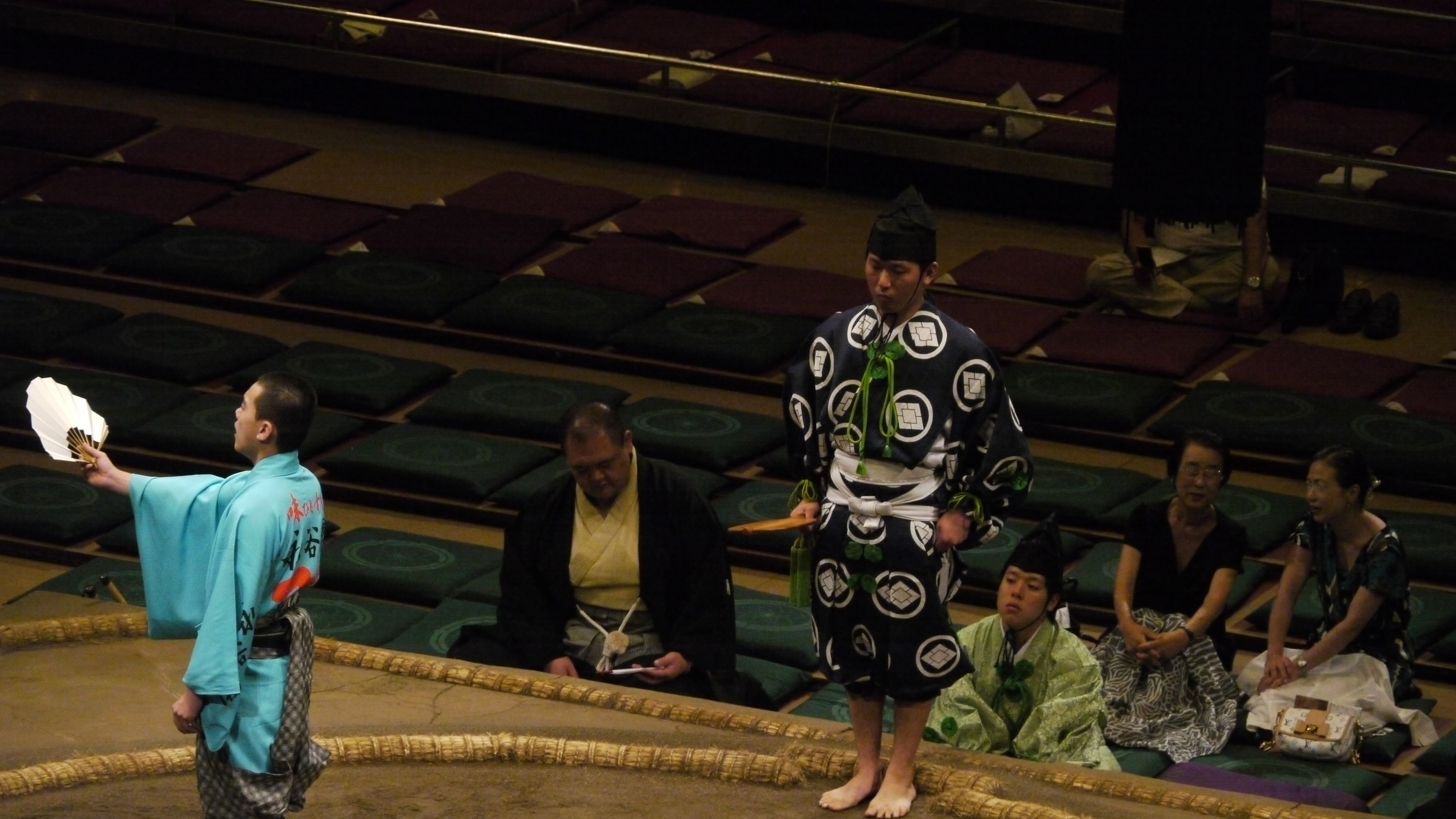
One of the judges seated behind the gyōji is responsible for keeping track of time.

One judge serves as timekeeper, sitting under the black tassel. He is responsible for keeping the pre-bout rituals on schedule, discreetly announcing jikan (時間; time is up) to the gyōji. The referee gives instructions to speed up or slow down the wrestlers' preparations in the ring via the yobidashi.

At the moment the fight is about to begin, it is up to the judges to stop the fight if they find that the wrestlers were incorrectly positioned. More specifically, the judges are responsible for ensuring that the wrestlers' fists touch the ground at the start of the match. During the match, the judges pay particular attention to the feet (which must always remain within the circle of the ring) and the hands (which must not grab the opponent's hair). If a match exceeds four minutes, it is up to the timekeeper to signal the referee to call a water break.

In the event of a kimarite (winning technique) that is difficult to decide for the gyōji tasked with announcing it to the public, it is up to the judges in the video review room to provide counseling. Top division Ura was known as a wrestler who used complicated and rare techniques, making him difficult to keep up with for the judges tasked with defining kimarite.

Like the matches' wrestlers, judges must also maintain a neutral expression while officiating and should not show emotion. However, it is not uncommon to see judges smile or laugh openly when young teenage professionals struggle to perform their tasks melodiously as they go through voice change. The proximity to the ring and the fights is not without risk; judges may be knocked over by wrestlers who fall off the dohyō, and it is not uncommon for judges to have their feet stepped on or their trousers torn by wrestlers making their way to the ring.

=== Banzuke and promotions ===
The judges are involved in establishing the rankings of the wrestlers, known as the banzuke. To do this, they meet on the Wednesday immediately following the end of a tournament. It is widely accepted that the personalities of judges play a major role in the promotions and demotions of wrestlers. In addition, power struggles and influence within the department may also play a role in the final decisions. Deliberations and ranks are decided in secret, the only exceptions being promotions to the ranks of jūryō, ōzeki, or yokozuna, which are the only ones announced on the day of the meeting so that the wrestlers concerned have time to prepare for their new rank.

The gyōji are also involved in the meeting as they act as clerks during the debates. During the meeting, the gyōji serve only as observers and are not invited to speak. Three gyōji are responsible for recording decisions on promotions and demotions, and their work is then used as the basis for the calligraphy known to the public.

If a promising wrestler meets the conditions (more or less or completely) that would allow him to be promoted to ōzeki, it is up to the Judging Department to debate and decide whether the wrestler deserves promotion. The process requires consensus. If they agree on the promotion, the judges send a request to the JSA board of directors for an extraordinary meeting to discuss the decision of the promotion. During the promotion process, the quality of the techniques used in the ring is recognized as an important criterion in the eyes of the Judging Department. In the event of promotion to the rank of yokozuna, the board of directors considers the request of the judges and forwards it to the Yokozuna Deliberation Council. In both cases, it is customary for the board of directors to follow the recommendations of the judges. It is then traditional for a director and a member of the Judging Department to visit the newly promoted wrestler's stable to announce the news, which takes place as part of a formal traditional ceremony.

=== Organizing matches and monitor practices ===
The matches of a tournament are decided by judges during planning meetings, deciding which combinations of wrestlers will compete against each other. As with the deliberations of the banzuke, the gyōji are also involved in the meeting as they act as clerks during the debates. The matches for the first two days are decided two days before the start of the tournament. From the third day onwards, the matches are decided the morning of the day before, meaning that the next day's matches are decided before the results of the same-day matches are known. The fourteenth and fifteenth days are exempt from this practice, and their matches are decided in the evening, after all matches have been completed. During decision-making meetings, matches are recorded on a very long scroll bearing the kanji for mirror (鏡) to symbolize that the organization is free from malice or error. All wrestlers are ranked in banzuke order on the scroll. Above their shikona are listed the wrestlers they have defeated, and below are the wrestlers who have defeated them. The judges plan the matches by placing Go stones on the ring names. All members of the Judging Department play a role in predicting matches, but other toshiyori may be involved without having the authority to sit ringside to judge matches.

Judges are responsible for issuing rules of etiquette to wrestlers in order to regulate behavior and preserve the dignity surrounding professional sumo. To this end, the judges intervene, albeit rarely, at meetings of the rikishi-kai (力士会), the pseudo syndicate grouping together sekitori-ranked wrestlers. Judges may also reinforce their instructions by issuing warnings to the coaches of wrestlers who break the rules. Recent examples of rules enacted by the Judging Department include prohibiting a wrestler suffering from a concussion from continuing a match, even if the outcome of the match is being contested.

== See also ==
- Glossary of sumo terms
- Rikishi
- Gyōji
- Yobidashi
- Tokoyama
