= Heya (sumo) =

Training places in professional sumo

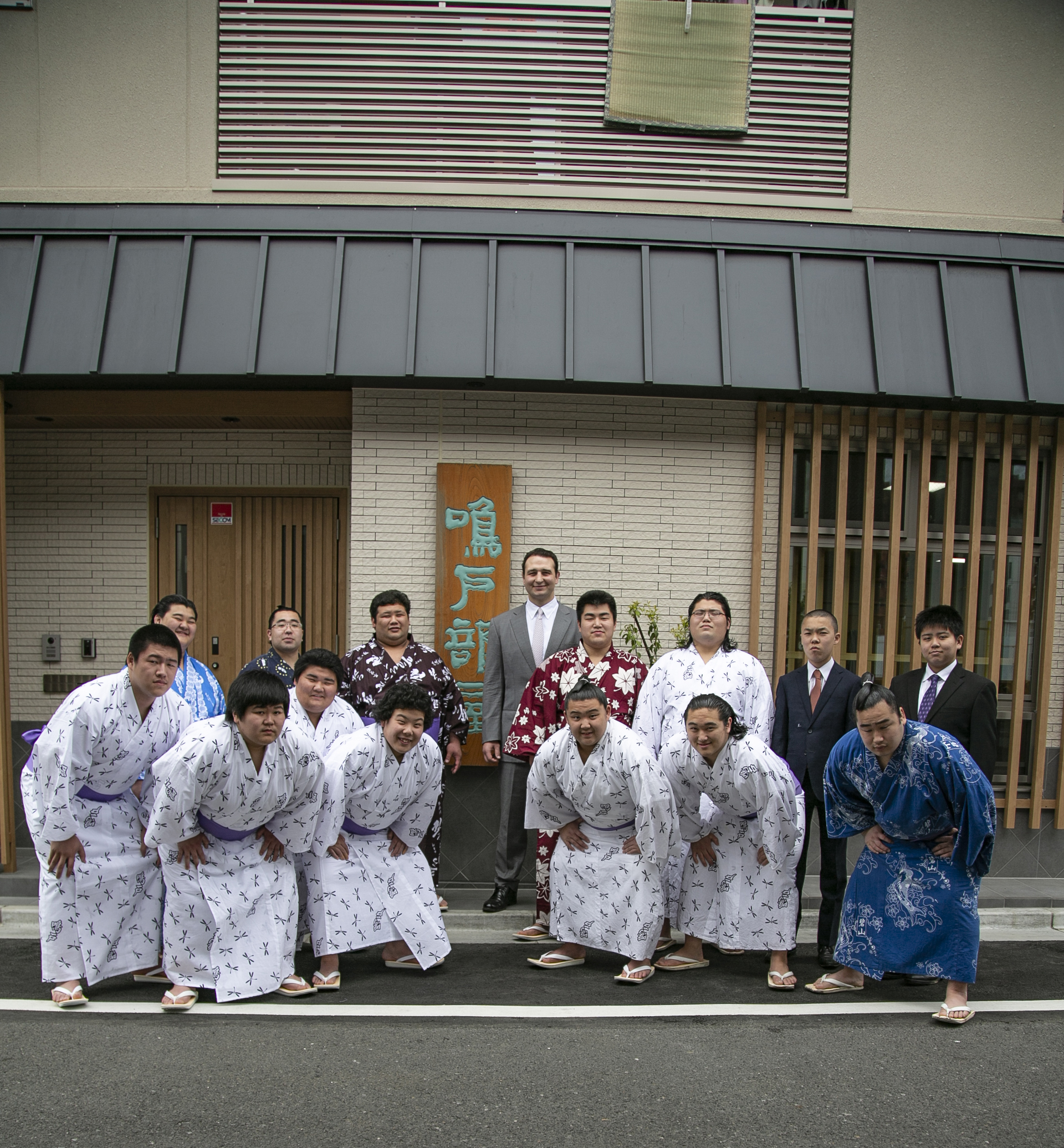
Sumo wrestlers of Naruto stable with, in the centre in suit and tie, stablemaster Naruto (the former Kotoōshū). On the right, in costume, junior-ranked yobidashi and gyōji also belong to the stable.

In professional sumo wrestling, a heya or beya (部屋; lit. 'room') (Note: When coming second in a compound word, heya is pronounced "-beya" due to a Japanese phonological tendency called rendaku. For example, Kokonoe stable is called "Kokonoe-beya" and a sumo stable is referred to as "sumo-beya".) is an organization of wrestlers where they train and live in a "quasi-monastic and militaristic lifestyle". It is most commonly and metaphorically translated in English as "stable", but is also translated as "training quarters", or "fraternity".

The stable system originated in the Genroku period and flourished in the Edo period. It was called into question during the Meiji Restoration, but it has survived to this day. Closer to a medieval fraternity than a modern sports team, a stable is a group that lives, eats, trains, sleeps, and socializes together, under the authority of one or more elders. There are no player trades in professional sumo, so joining a stable is expected to be a lifetime commitment. Of all the staff at the Japan Sumo Association, only toshiyori can open or inherit a heya and manage it, as part of a system regulated by the association. Each heya is financially supported both by the Association and by groups of patrons known as koenkai. All traditional sports professionals (such as gyōji, yobidashi and tokoyama) must belong to a stable, and wrestlers from the same stable are not allowed to fight each other during official tournaments (honbasho).

The Association only permits one foreign-born wrestler per stable. The system excludes women, who remain confined to a role of support and devotion to sumo and its ancestral rules. Although largely independent, the stables belong to clans, called ichimon, that form loose coalitions. The clans traditionally serve to maintain the cohesion of stables linked by family ties, and affect the distribution of influence within the Japan Sumo Association. As of October 2024, there are 45 active stables across five clans. (Note: As of October 2024, the stables are distributed by clans as follow with (from most to least) Nishonoseki (17 stables), followed by Dewanoumi (14), Isegahama (5), Tokitsukaze (5) and Takasago (4).) Stables have long developed recruitment networks, encouraged by subsidies from the association, which create disparities in size, sometimes significant, between heya. The largest and most successful have a completely different training environment from the smaller stables, which are described as being more family-oriented.

Stable buildings typically share the same spatial layout, with the training room (keikoba) as a central focus. This land is considered sacred ground and no one is supposed to walk or sleep above it. Most stable buildings share the same neighborhood in Ryōgoku (Sumida, Tokyo), sumo's traditional heartland, although issues with finding land have led to some newer heya being built in other parts of Tokyo or its suburbs. Although based in Tokyo or its surrounding areas, the stables are required to travel for external tournaments and tours around Japan, relying on a system of accommodation supported by shrines or town halls, linked both by the ties between professional sumo and the Shinto religion and by the economic and social benefits of having professional athletes in nearby areas.

In the daily life of the heya, the distribution of activities is highly hierarchical and governed by the rank of the wrestlers, with those at the bottom of the ranking being assigned the most thankless tasks and the sekitori being exempt from any participation. At the top of the heya hierarchy are the toshiyori, or coaches, who are responsible for training the wrestlers and assigning tasks. Life in the heya is also characterized by a high degree of closeness, with wrestlers having little personal space. In recent years, heya have distanced themselves from traditional communal life practices, improving their transparency, and reusing codes from modern sports teams. Some have also changed their internal organization, allowing wrestlers to be exempt from chores so that they can devote themselves to training, or training stablemasters at universities before they take on their responsibilities. In an effort to open up and popularize the sport, many heya now welcome visitors and forge links with local communities.

In 2004, the Japan Sumo Association recorded a record number of 55 active stables.

== History ==
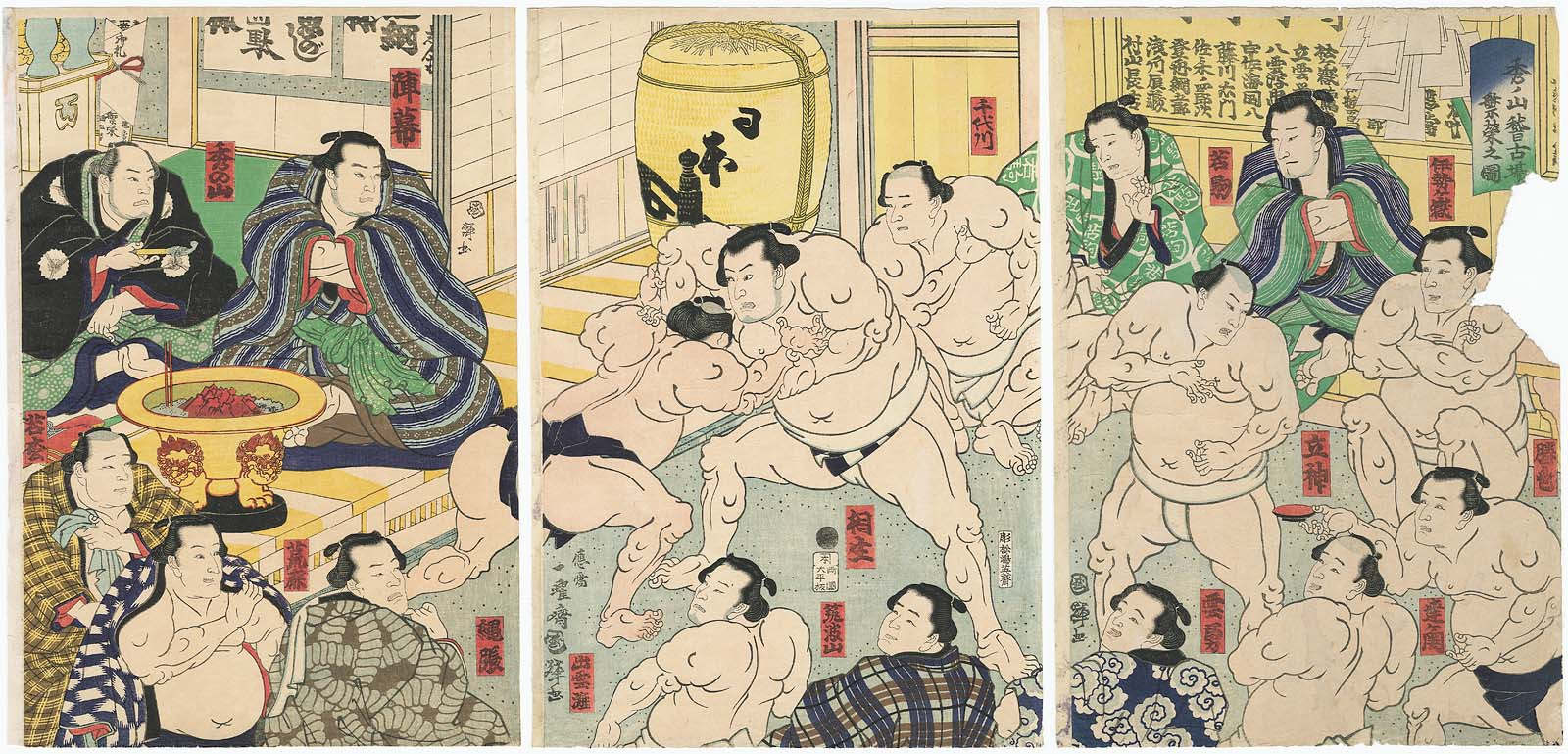
Flourishing Activity at the Practice Ground of Hidenoyama's Stable by Utagawa Kuniteru II (c. 1860)

During the Genroku period, sumo groups concentrated from the countryside to the major cities of Edo, Osaka and Kyoto.These groups consisted of masterless samurai (called rōnin) who had lost their social benefits with the peace established by the Tokugawa shogunate. These rōnin put their martial art skills to use in street sumo tournaments, called tsuji-zumō (辻相撲, tsuji-sumo; lit. 'street-corner wrestling'), for the entertainment of passers-by. A number of street entertainment wrestling groups formed and sometimes toured shrines with benefit sumo performances to raise money for the construction of buildings.

Gradually, the groups self-organised under the leadership of elders, who welcomed the wrestlers into their homes. Their homes took the name of heya (meaning "fraternity house") in reference to the rooms in which these elders met to organise matches during tournaments. During this period, the term heya therefore referred to both the training institutions and the living space of the masters. The system became profitable and was adopted by sumo associations in Osaka and Edo between 1757 and 1792. During the Hōreki era, masters began to inherit the names of their predecessors, and heya were gradually referred to by the name borne by the master. Almost every sumo stable founded within the Edo-based sumo association was created between 1751 and 1781. Edo established itself as a major sumo sports center, and it was common for wrestlers from other major metropolises (such as Kyoto and Osaka) to emigrate and train with the heya of the Edo-based sumo association. Although mostly founded by former wrestlers, some stables dating back to the 17th century were founded by gyōji (referees).

During the Edo period, all wrestlers were officially attached to a stable, but a formal exception existed for wrestlers who benefited from the patronage of local lords, who took the most prominent wrestlers under their wing. These wrestlers, who continued to wrestle for their stable, were considered "borrowed" from the lords rather than officially attached to their heya, thus giving the name kakae-rikishi (抱え力士; lit. 'embraced wrestler' or 'retained wrestler') to the wrestlers and to the system.

During the Meiji Restoration and the abolition of the han system, stables lost the patronage of the lords, who were forbidden to maintain households of their own. With the loss of income security and social status came a period of semi-censorship of sumo. The adoption of Western ideology led to the perception of sumo as unworthy of the new era, as the matches were seen as barbaric and the semi-nudity of the wrestlers shocking. Some stables organized themselves into fire brigades.

In 1943, at the turning point of the Pacific War, sumo competitions were disrupted and Tokyo became the target of intensive bombardments that destroyed many stables. Most of the remaining stables moved to the Tokyo suburbs or neighboring towns to escape the bombing. Wrestlers were either drafted into the army or navy, or incorporated into provincial work units organized by stable.

During the 1970s, the question arose of opening up the toshiyori title to foreign wrestlers, and ultimately allowing them to create stables. The Japan Sumo Association initially declared that it was inconceivable that a foreigner could participate as a trainer because sumo was Japan's national sport. After harsh criticism from the press, the JSA declared that the two rising stars of foreign origin Takamiyama and Kaneshiro would indeed be eligible to become coaches after their retirement. Takamiyama was the first to retire, becoming a coach under the name Azumazeki and founding Azumazeki stable, the first foreign-born sumo wrestler to do so. In 2003, former yokozuna Musashimaru also retired and in 2013 founded Musashigawa stable.

== Organization and running ==
=== Stable ownership ===
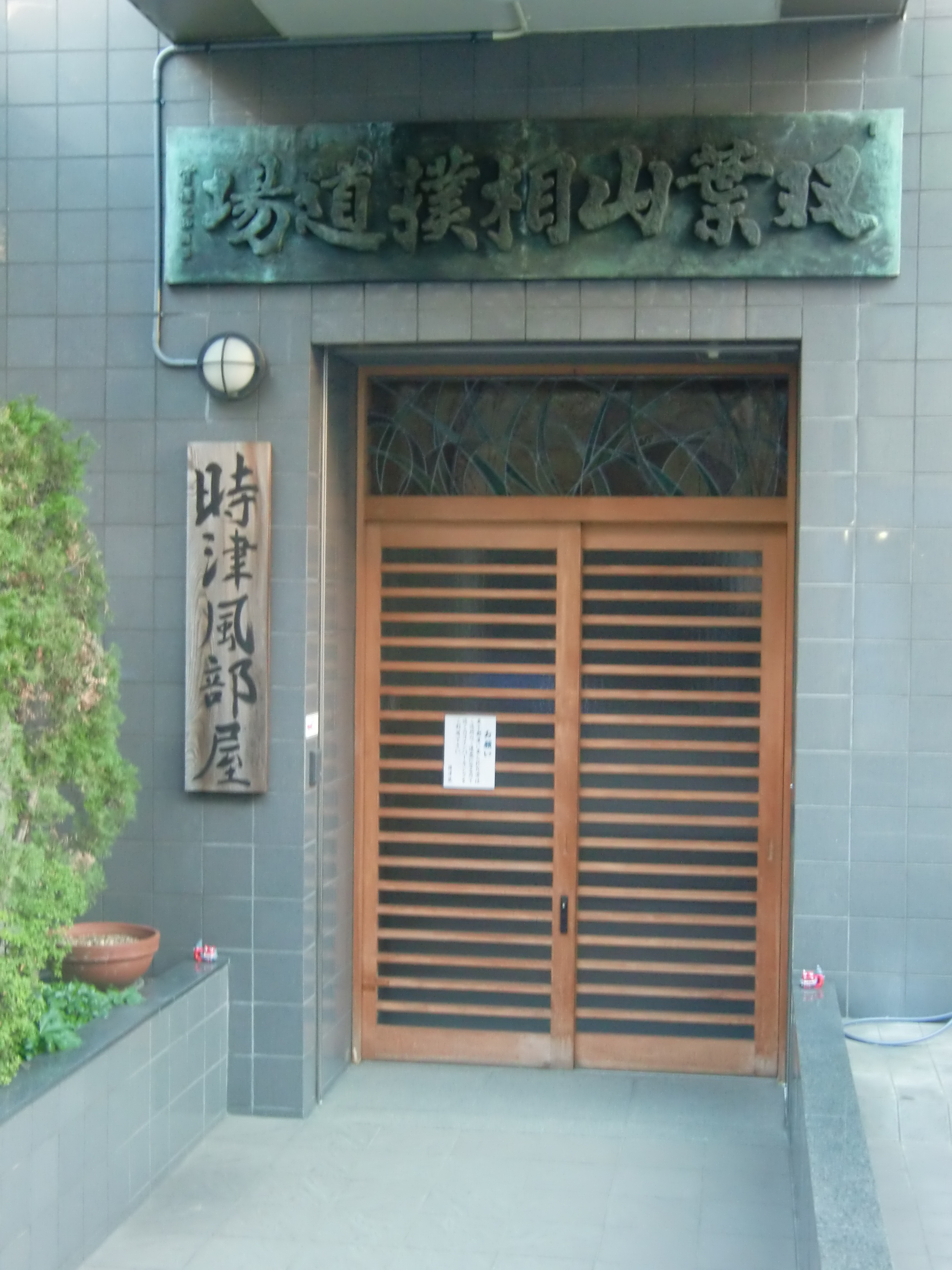
The entrance of Tokitsukaze stable still bears the Futabayama Sumo Dōjō (双葉山相撲道場) sign in honor of the stable's founder (written from right to left)

The approval of the Japan Sumo Association is required to open a new stable or to inherit an existing one. The approval is regularly granted and the association gives its elders a great deal of leeway, but it ultimately has the final say in heya organization. Technically, any retired (Note: Historically, it was also possible to found a stable while still being an active wrestler. This process was allowed by the nimaikansatsu (二枚鑑札) rule, or two-license system, meaning possessing both a wrestler's and a trainer's license.) wrestler who has become a toshiyori by acquiring an elder share in the Japan Sumo Association can open his own stable. The Sumo Association, however, imposes additional requirements for opening stables. Toshiyori who wish to exercise this right must have had career that has either taken them to the ranks of yokozuna or ōzeki, have them held a san'yaku rank for at least twenty-five tournaments, or have been a maegashira for sixty tournaments. There are more relaxed conditions for inheriting a stable when the stablemaster leaves. A toshiyori can take over a stable provided he has competed in at least twelve tournaments in the makuuchi division or twenty tournaments in the jūryō division or higher.

Since only 105 shares exist, there is thus a maximum potential of 105 stables. A heya is always named after the toshiyori kabu (the name of the elder share) owned by its head coach. A stablemaster is obligated to retire and pass on ownership of his heya at age 65. When someone who has not inherited the retiree's elder name takes over a heya, the name of the heya is generally changed to the new owner's elder name.

In most cases, men become stablemasters through inheritance. A stablemaster can choose any successor who meets the eligibility requirements. Most leave their stable to one of its members when they die or retire. His heir will usually change his elder name to take over the reins of the stable. To do so, he must make a traditional payment to the former stablemaster for the elder share, as well as a payment for the building and land. Since the cost is high, sometimes masters sign a contract to make monthly payments or rental fees instead. There are nuances in the inheritance of stables that differ slightly from the classic management of an elder share. Stables are run on the basis of family relationships, and hence a stablemaster is more likely to give his stable to a relative, or to someone who marries into the family.

The other way to become a stablemaster is independence, through the founding of a new stable. Often, new stables are founded by masters who have little chance of inheriting their home stable. The creation of a stable is never immediate. Elders who wish to set one up usually stay with their former stable for a while as a coach, to learn how to manage it. The new stable is usually founded by taking on some of the wrestlers from the old stable. It is common for the new stable to maintain strong links with its original stable. However, the creation of new stables remains a marginal phenomenon, as elders often lack the financial backing to become independent. In the 1990s, rumor had it that founding a stable required around ¥200 million. In the early 2020s, the trend was for stables to close and merge with one another.

=== Finances ===
Until 1950, the stables operated without assistance from the association. In return, the stables divided up the Japanese territory to organize tours and the donations collected went entirely to the stable. Since 1950, stablemasters receive an additional sum with their salary every month to cover the needs of their stable. These include the cost of buying food, maintaining the building and training equipment, and paying for the extra costs of training wrestlers. In addition to this maintenance sum, a fixed sum is paid for any wrestler in the stable who has not reached sekitori status. A so-called "incentive" sum is also paid every tournament month, meaning every two months starting in January, for each wrestler trained to sekitori status. This sum varies according to a wrestler's current rank: the higher he is in the hierarchy, the higher the sum paid to his stable master. In this system, where the big stables receive large sums of money, the distribution of funds is designed as an incentive for elders to recruit and train winning wrestlers. In the wake of a scandal that revealed links between several wrestlers and trainers and organized crime, reforms were put in place forcing stables to publish the list of their patrons and to be able to set up only in buildings whose owners had been previously recognized by the Sumo Association, in order to increase the financial transparency of professional sumo.

Although the association gives money to the stables, they remain financially very challenging to maintain, with costs such as food running into the thousands of US dollars per month. A saying states that a stable is only profitable when it can house ten wrestlers. Stables are therefore largely dependent on support groups. These groups of patrons, known as koenkai, began to emerge during the late and mid-Edo period in Edo and Osaka. The groups grew during the Meiji period, when nobles who had previously formed wrestling groups turned away from the sport. In their place, associations of patrons were formed to award prizes to wrestlers who scored well in tournaments. The first two associations among the oldest known were the hinoshita kai (日下会) and the banzai kai (万歳会), the latter not being linked to any particular stable. The practice of creating a patron's club to support famous wrestlers then developed in the early 20th century. In those days, supporting wrestlers by taking them to lunch or paying for their entertainment was considered a great extravagance. Nowadays, being seen in the company of wrestlers is still an indication of status and wealth. Patron groups can support specific stables or wrestlers. They vary in size according to popularity. It's not unusual for koenkai to be run by powerful financiers or government officials, with a restricted and elitist group membership. Although most of the support and sums paid to the stables remain secret, some relationships are well known, such as the relationship between the old Futagoyama stable (latterly known as the former Takanohana stable) and a Buddhist sect, which is said to have contributed the equivalent of $5 million to the stable.

== The ichimon ==
As in other traditional disciplines such as Noh or Shogi, where players belong to schools which in turn belong to larger groups of traditions, heya belong to groups formed throughout the history of sumo. In professional sumo, these groups are called ichimon (一門; lit. 'clan' or 'family'), a grouping of stables in which each stable must be affiliated. Clans are sometimes referred to as the sports equivalent of a traditional family or a commonwealth. If an elder decides to set up his own stable and he and his former master part on good terms, his stable will be part of the same clan as his original stable. Following the Takanoiwa affair and the dissolution of the Takanohana ichimon in 2018, the total number of clans in the Sumo Association was fixed to five and it was made mandatory for all stables to choose which clan to join, putting an end to the loose system and the autonomy of stables in their choice of alignments.

The ichimon are encouraged to support each other. This support is mainly shown during joint training sessions, called degeiko (出稽古), but also during festivities such as weddings and funerals of a member of the same clan. Similarly, when a promotion is announced, it is customary for members of a clan to attend to congratulate the promoted wrestler. At the end of a tournament, it is customary for the winner to be accompanied in the parade out of the arena by a wrestler from his ichimon, who acts as flag-bearer. After a wrestler is promoted to the rank of yokozuna, it is traditional for the ceremony to create his tsuna (sacred rope belt) to be organized by his stable and those of his ichimon. It is also customary for a yokozuna to perform his ring-entering ceremony accompanied by a tsuyuharai and a tachimochi from his clan.

The organization of the clan system is particularly important within the Japan Sumo Association, as its balance determines the positions of directors and the balance of power within the board of directors ahead of the elections. Shimpan (judges) nominations are also decided within the clan, each ichimon having a number of judges reserved for it among the department's twenty members. A little-shown but important ichimon support is also materialized by the political alliances within the Sumo Association, with the elections held every two years. The ichimon serves as quasi-political groupings, each clan nominating candidates for the ten positions or so that are available on the association's board each election cycle. Each vote is normally along the interests of the ichimon, which explain why the bigger clans more often holds the association's chairmanship.

Of the five current clans, not all enjoy the same influence within the association. For example, the Dewanoumi and Nishonoseki clans each have more influence than the three smallest clans (Tokitsukaze, Isegahama and Takasago) combined.

== Stablemates ==
=== Recruitment and wrestlers ===
Since the 1970s, the largest stables have established scouting networks throughout Japan, supported with the help of retired wrestlers and patron-club members. The process of being recruited by a stable is fairly straightforward, with most heya happy to publish their details and telephone number on their own website. It is also not rare for acquaintances of the coaches or stablemaster, or one of the stable wrestlers, to bring potential apprentices to a specific stable. When on tours, masters always reach out to young wrestlers in an effort to find future professionals. Despite all the efforts made by masters to attract new talent, it is often the case that young wrestlers are motivated to join the stable solely by the reputation and achievements of the current master. Most of the time, the stables ask their new recruits to train for a trial period before accepting a wrestler definitively.

Recruiting new wrestlers has become increasingly difficult. This is mainly due to low financial guarantees, as only wrestlers who have qualified as sekitori can earn a salary. Historically, free food and housing was sufficient compensation to attract many apprentices, but since the 1980s young men are less interested in a career path where only few of them made it far enough to earn any paycheck. The rigors of stable life, typical of the lower ranks of the hierarchy, are also an obstacle. Stablemasters with the best links to school and university programs typically attract more wrestlers, threatening the survival of stables without this type of contact.

The most populous stables in professional sumo are (as of October 2025 and in descending order), Isegahama stable followed by Takasago stable, Oitekaze stable and Tamanoi stable. Only four other stables managed to maintain a roster of more than twenty wrestlers, Sakaigawa stable, Nishonoseki stable, Kise stable and Kokonoe stable. At the other end of the scale, only two stables have fewer than five wrestlers: Kataonami stable with four wrestlers (including two sekitori) and Nishikido stable with three wrestlers. Of all the active stables, twelve had no salaried wrestlers. In terms of proportions, Kise and Oitekaze are the stables with the best ratio of sekitori to total members (six sekitori out of twenty-one wrestlers each). Isegahama stable was previously recognized as having the best ratio, but since the merger of Miyagino stable in March 2024, its number of wrestlers have more than doubled. Isegahama and Kise have the most sekitori (ex aequo) of any stable, with six salaried wrestlers each.

Generally speaking, professional sumo does not allow a wrestler who has decided to retire to return to the sport. Furthermore, there are no player trades in professional sumo. When a wrestler begins his career in a stable, he is expected to stay there until he retires. There are rare exceptions. If the coach who originally scouted a wrestler leaves to found a new heya, he might be permitted to follow. If a heya shuts down—due to the retirement or death of the stablemaster, mismanagement, or financial reasons—the remaining wrestlers are often permitted to transfer to another heya, usually within the same ichimon but not always.

==== Foreign recruits ====
When registering as a wrestler, foreigners must have the support of two guarantors and a work visa. Foreigners who are accepted as apprentices generally find it very difficult to integrate into stable life, and especially to get used to the diet. The Japan Sumo Association caps the number of foreign wrestlers who can enter a professional stable.

Restrictions on the number of foreigners allowed in professional sumo began in 1992, after Ōshima stable recruited six Mongolians at the same time. The Sumo Association's new director Dewanoumi announced that he was considering limiting the number of foreign recruits per stable and to cap it at the level of the entire association. The decision remained informal, but foreign recruitment ceased for a period of around six years. Dewanoumi's decision was later overturned, with the formalization that a limit of only two foreign wrestlers could belong to the same stable. At association level, the total number of foreign wrestlers was set at forty. In 2002, a one foreigner per stable policy was officially adopted, though the ban was not retroactive, so foreigners recruited before the changes were unaffected.

The move has been met with criticism, not least because Japan, with its centuries-old and xenophobic culture, is accustomed to treating foreign wrestlers as gaijin (外人; lit. 'outsiders' or 'aliens'), regardless of their place of birth, reinforcing the difference that the public and the media make between foreign and Japanese wrestlers. Paradoxically, all wrestlers involved in professional sumo are formally treated the same once they have joined the stables, and no distinction is clearly made as to any special treatment for foreigners. John Gunning also proposed another interpretation of the decision, claiming that this rule was not based on racist sentiment but to ensure that foreign rikishi assimilate into sumo culture. He explained, there would be ten Hawaiian wrestlers in the same stable living in their own "little clique," not learning Japanese, so the rule "protects the culture of stables."

Originally, it was possible for a place in a stable to open up if a foreign born wrestler acquired Japanese citizenship. This occurred when Hisanoumi changed his nationality from Tongan at the end of 2006, allowing another Tongan to enter his stable. However, on 23 February 2010 the Sumo Association announced that it had changed its definition of "foreign" to "foreign-born" ('gaikoku shusshin'), meaning that even naturalized Japanese citizens will be considered foreigners if they were born outside of Japan. The restriction on one foreign wrestler per stable was also reconfirmed. This change in policy was also attributed to the actions of former yokozuna Asashōryū, which fueled a growing anti-foreigner feeling within the Sumo Association. As Japanese law does not recognize subcategories of Japanese citizen, it was pointed out that this unique treatment of naturalized citizens may be illegal under Japanese law.

Since 1976, if a foreigner wishes become a toshiyori by acquiring an elder share in the Japan Sumo Association, he must give up his nationality and become a Japanese citizen. In recent years, an increasing number of wrestlers of foreign origin have become elders and founded stables.

=== Stablemates matches ===
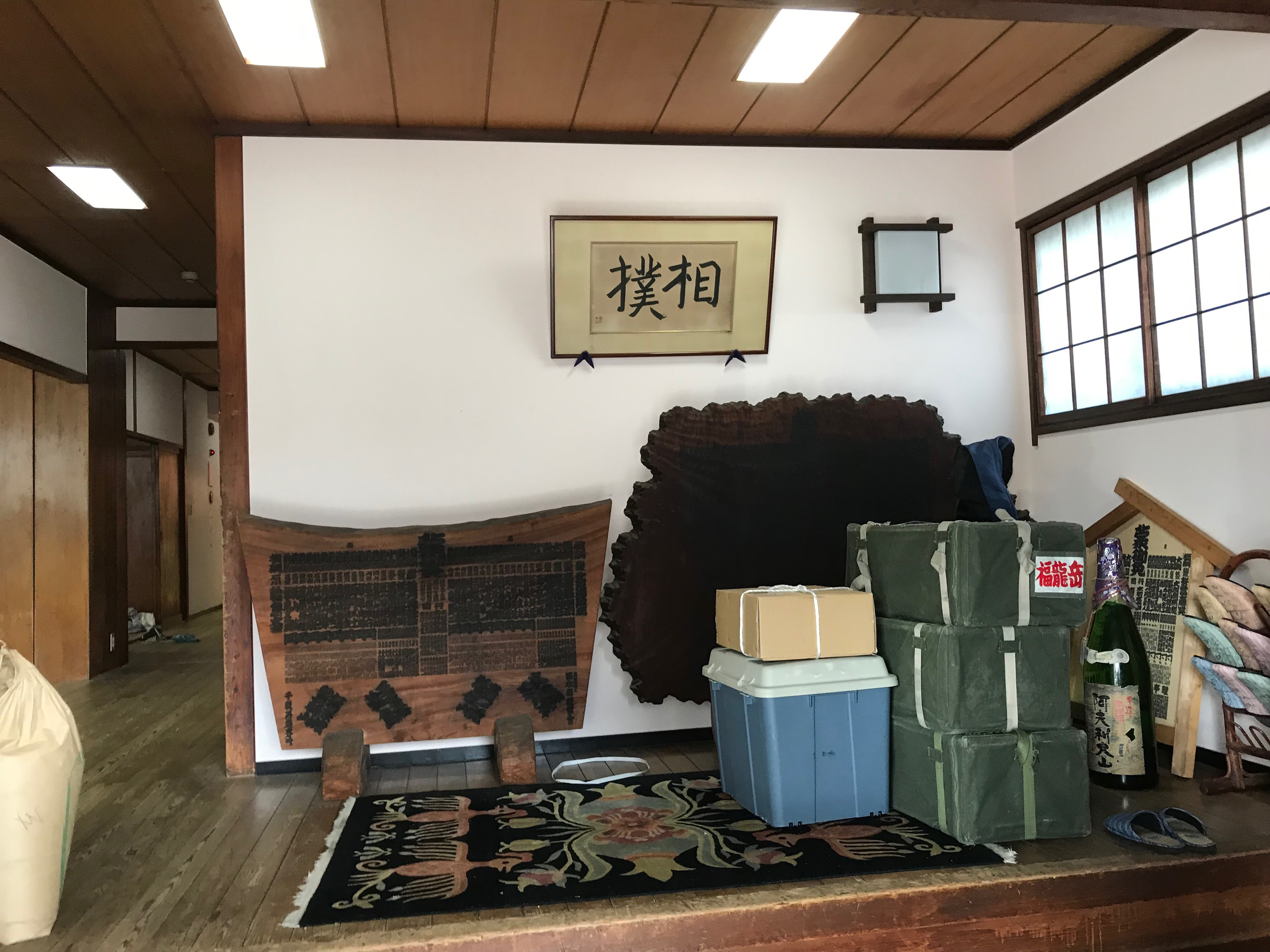
The genkan of Dewanoumi stable

Since stable members live in a brotherhood similar to a family, they are forbidden to fight another member of their stable during tournaments. This rule was not always the norm and during the Edo period, stablemates could compete against each other. The current rule was introduced because of the fear that wrestlers who share the same training, coaches, hobbies and meals would give in to the temptation of wanting to help a stablemate. Since stables are generally created by transferring wrestlers from an original stable, match-ups between wrestlers who used to belong to the same stable are also avoided as much as possible. A special rule nonetheless dictates that wrestlers from the same heya can fight each other in a playoff situation for a yūshō, or divisional championship. Since wrestlers do not compete directly with each other, this system encourages a sense of unity and loyalty between members of a given stable.

This non-confrontation rule is known to frustrate stables that don't have several top-ranked wrestlers. In the world of professional sumo, where there are no player transfers, the no-match rule between stablemates can play a crucial role in allocating yūshō for entire seasons, provided that, with the hazards of stable closures and openings or the training of great wrestlers, a stable is able to count on several competent wrestlers. For example, the rule worked to the advantages of Futagoyama stable's Takanohana, Wakanohana and Takanonami, during the 1994–2000 period, as they never had to fight each other when all three were at the top of the ranking, either ranked at ōzeki or yokozuna. In addition, during Futagoyama's pinnacle, these wrestlers could do without facing five other wrestlers on the makuuchi roster with the presence of Akinoshima, Takatōriki, Misugisato, Takamisugi and Wakashoyo during the 1992–1995 period. During the same period of time, however, Yokozuna Akebono had to face all the wrestlers in the same division. Since Akebono and Wakanohana had close matches, when the latter won against the former it was common to say that Wakanohana provided suppressive fire (援護射撃, engoshageki) for his brother Takanohana, who was often in the title race with his rival Akebono. Recent examples also include Takayasu's promotion to the rank of ōzeki while stablemate Kisenosato was yokozuna or when Terunofuji was also ranked at ōzeki while stablemate Harumafuji was also yokozuna. During the same period of the duo Kisenosato-Takayasu and Harumafuji-Terunofuji, ōzeki Gōeidō and both yokozuna Kakuryū and Hakuhō were to face most makuuchi wrestlers.

=== Women in the heya ===
In the world of stables, there is no place for women with the exception of the stablemaster's wife or family and possibly a maid. In this highly masculine world, a Shōwa era saying held that the birth of a daughter in the midst of a heya was a source of great joy because traditionally marrying his master's daughter allows a wrestler to inherit the heya to which he belongs, ensuring the financial and sporting continuity of the other staff members.

The wife of the stablemaster is known as the okamisan. She is traditionally expected to abandon her career and devote herself entirely to helping her husband. She takes on the role of surrogate mother for the people attached to the stable, imitating the stablemaster's paternal role. Since most young recruits become wrestlers after junior high school, the emotional and physical separation from their families can be very painful, and it is the okamisan's role to comfort and advise them. In the stable, the okamisan is responsible for a wide variety of tasks. She mainly advises recruits and helps with kitchen chores. She is also in charge of management, teaching, accounting, and even banking, since she is often in charge of the young wrestlers savings. She manages the public relations of the stable, whether with the wrestlers' families or the patron's organization. Okamisan play such an important role in the stables that without them many heya would find it difficult to function. Okamisan have organized a group to advise and support each other.

It is not unusual for the okamisan herself to be familiar with the world of stables, and some are the daughters of sumo wrestlers who have become stablemasters in their own right. A recent example included the marriage of former ōzeki Takakeishō to the daughter of former Hokuten'yū in 2020. Historically, most stablemasters' wives came from families managing ryokan or even traditional dancers. Some okamisan were also models or actresses. For example, the wife of Wakashimazu is the former singer Mizue Takada. More unusually, the okamisan of Asakayama and Nishikido are a former pro-wrestler and soprano respectively.

Due to the Shinto roots of professional sumo, women do not have full freedom of movement in the stable. Their actions are subject to the same restrictions as other professional sumo-related events, due to traditions that consider women's bodies impure. Even in the stable, a woman is not allowed to move around the training area, and must remain on the observation platform next to it to converse or watch the wrestlers. Furthermore, unlike other traditional sumo professionals, who are all men, okamisan do not receive a salary despite their important position in the organization of the stables. Because their position is based exclusively on a marital bond, some okamisan faced with the death of their husband are required to hand over their home (the stable) to a successor and leave the building's apartments to take up other activities. This was notably the case for the wife of Asashio III who, after his sudden death, left to run a family chankonabe restaurant in Nagano prefecture.

=== Other personnel ===
Active wrestlers and masters are not the only members of the Japan Sumo Association to be attached to the stables. All the traditional professions affiliated with the association are attached to the stable system.

Wrestlers who have not attained the prerequisites to become a master or who have not been able to secure possession of an elder share may remain with their stable. Their tasks are to supervise the young wrestlers and manage minor jobs for the association. They essentially become contract employees, customarily retaining their old shikona as their professional name. They are separated into two distinct roles: wakaimonogashira (若者頭) and sewanin (世話人). Wakaimonogashira, or "youth leaders", serve as officials of the association. They typically work at their former stables or within the associated ichimon. Wakaimonogashira are tasked with arranging maezumō matches and supervising young sumo wrestlers from makushita and below. They also appear in public next to the dohyō during the honbasho closing ceremony, receiving the trophies given to the tournament winner to return them backstage. There is a maximum of eight wakaimonogashira within the Japan Sumo Association. Sewanin, or "caretakers", work as transportation and storage managers, handling association equipment used for tournaments and regional tours. In addition they deal with miscellaneous, primarily physical tasks. They are instructed by the master of the stable they belong to, or other association members (including wakaimonogashira). There can be only thirteen sewanin within the Japan Sumo Association.

In addition to the former wrestlers, the stables also host gyōji (referee) and yobidashi (handymen). Both groups are involved in the management of their stables during the periods between tournaments, and it is not uncommon for referees to be entrusted with clerical work. Tokoyama (hairdressers) are also affiliated to the stables. Stables that do not have their own tokoyama can turn to hairdressers from other stables belonging to the same ichimon to do their wrestlers' hair, or a communal hairdresser at the tournament. If a tokoyama's stable doesn't have a more experienced hairdresser, a hairdresser from the same ichimon will take over the apprenticeship.

== Life in the stable ==
=== Building ===
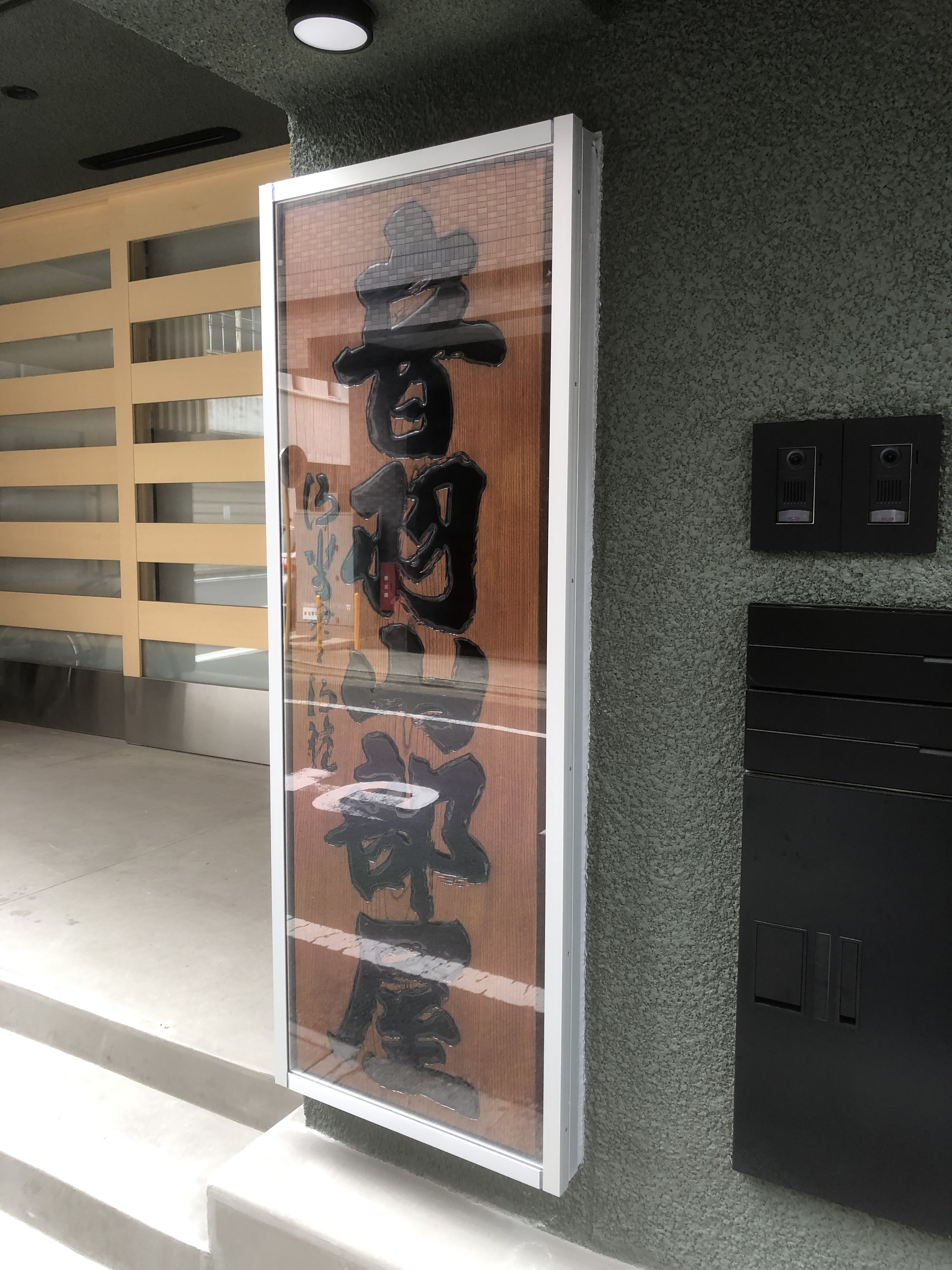
The Otowayama stable wooden nameplate was calligraphed by the head priest of the Kiyomizu-dera (in Kyoto), Mori Kiyonori, who is known for writing the emblematic kanji of the years in Japan.

The entrance to a stable is often marked by a calligraphic wooden nameplate. Some of them are carefully written by famous calligraphers. Most signs are installed vertically. Stables have a great deal of freedom in the signs they choose to install: the Arashio stable's sign was calligraphed to depict a cliffside landscape facing the sea, while the Miyagino stable's sign made the unconventional choice of applying gold leaf to the name, at a total cost of ¥2 million.

Each stable features the same basic layouts, with common rooms that can be used as dormitories, a dining area, communal baths and a training room equipped with a dohyō (called keikoba). Next to it, a wooden or tatami platform is set up so that masters can watch training more comfortably and visitors can observe the training session. The stablemaster lives in his stable, with his quarters on the upper floors. He lives there with his family in an apartment better furnished than the rest of the building. In the common room, personal storage is usually nothing more than a plastic container.

An emblematic feature of stables, the training room (keikoba) is often located on the first floor, next to the entrance. This particularity is often a challenge for architects who work on the construction of stable buildings because this land is considered sacred ground and no one is supposed to walk or sleep above it. Some stables have therefore decided to install their training ring on the top floor. The floor of the training room is entirely covered with earth, and the walls are often clad with wooden planks, installed to absorb the shock of wrestlers who are pushed against the walls during training. In the corners of the room are often teppō, wooden poles for practicing striking. The training room is often equipped with several windows for ventilation, as most stables do not have air conditioning or heating installed in this room. Since the floor is considered sacred ground, a kamidana (a small Shinto altar) is often hung on the wall. Stables traditionally display their members' names and rankings on the wall of their training room. This is done using calligraphic wooden plaques. Some stables decide not to imitate competition rings in order to minimize the risk of injury by removing straw limits, while others install several training dohyō to allow several apprentices to train at the same time.

Until the end of the 1960s, a large number of stable buildings were in a dilapidated state. During the 1970s, many stables began to undertake renovation work, aided by the success of their star wrestlers (such as Taihō for Nishonoseki stable and Takamiyama for Takasago stable). As financing a new stable building is expensive, it's not uncommon for newly independent stablemasters to take up temporary residence in unsuitable buildings before moving again. Onoe stable, for example, converted a narrow garage into a training room. Another method of obtaining a suitable building is to reuse the building of a stable that has previously moved, as was the case for Musashigawa stable, which currently occupies the premises of the now-defunct Nakamura stable.

Most of the stables are located in the district of Ryōgoku of Sumida, Tokyo. Historically, this installation is due to the decision of the Edo authorities to maintain two tournaments per year at the Ekō-in temple, located in this district. Within Ryōgoku, a good half of the stables are located less than two kilometers from the Ryōgoku Kokugikan. Even during the period when the association's headquarters were relocated to the Kuramae neighborhood (in Taitō) with the Kuramae Kokugikan, no stable made the choice to move out of the Ryōgoku district. However, some stables choose to relocate, in particular under the impetus of districts wishing to revitalize their neighborhoods by setting up a sumo institution, which is usually a popular tourist spot. In the 2020s, several stables have chosen to relocate in the neighbourhoods of Shibamata (Katsushika), Hashiba (Taitō) and Rokuchō (Adachi).

=== On tour ===
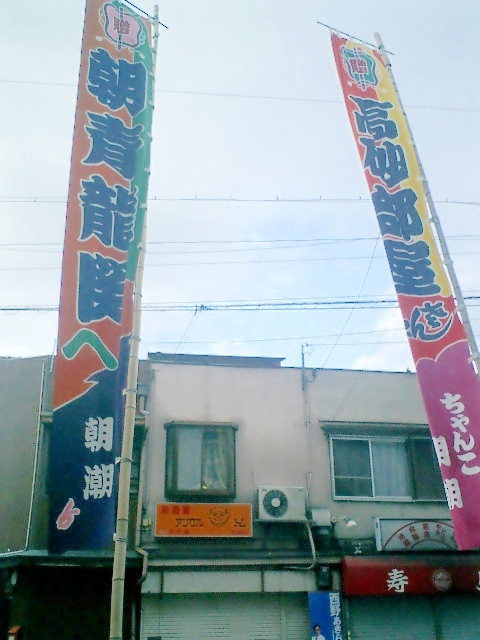
Nobori banners in front of Takasago stable quarters in Higashiōsaka (left bearing the name of Asashōryū and right bearing the name of the stable.

When the stables have to travel outside Tokyo for the year's three external tournaments, they often set up in shrine grounds due to the Shinto origins of sumo. For example, Tatsunami stable is known for being hosted at the Sumiyoshi-taisha during the Osaka tournament, and Miyagino stable at Nanzo-in during the Kyushu tournament. In recent years, however, more and more stables have opted for community centers. The decision to relocate accommodation is often due to requests from sanctuaries who, in accommodating the large stables, often notice damage to temple precincts and buildings. These installations in community centers also raise a number of questions, not least because some municipalities, particularly interested in the presence of wrestlers, often offer a large number of lodgings, some of which are also dedicated to emergency accommodation in the event of natural disasters.

For residents of the communities where the stables are located, it's also an opportunity to take part in activities designed to strengthen ties between residents and wrestlers. During the local tournaments, the relative independence of married wrestlers comes to an end, as they are obliged to stay with the rest of the wrestlers in the dormitory.

During the scandal surrounding the links between certain stables and organized crime, it was revealed that several stables had used a criminal network to find land on which to settle, such as Sakaigawa stable for the Nagoya tournament or Matsugane stable for the Osaka tournament.

=== A strict lifestyle ===
Life in a stable is similar to that of a family home and a paramilitary organization. Stable management is above all autocratic and incorporates elements of communal life. Most wrestlers, and all junior-ranked ones, live in their stable in a dormitory style: training, cleaning, eating, sleeping and socializing together. At the top of the social pyramid, the shishō (師匠; stablemaster) takes on a paternal role. Of all the coaches potentially present in the stable, he alone is the owner of the stable and therefore the highest authority in communal life.

The respect and duties associated with wrestlers depend entirely on their ranking. Upon joining the stable, a young recruit is assigned to a more experienced wrestler. In theory, this mentoring by a senior wrestler is encouraged so that a newcomer is familiar with the codes of stable life. In practice, however, recruits become responsible for so many chores that they can be considered "personal slaves". At the very top of the active wrestlers is the heya-gashira, the highest-ranked wrestler in his stable. In the internal organization of the stables, the hierarchy often implies that successful wrestlers barely out of their twenties have authority over newly recruited teenagers, which regularly creates discipline problems.

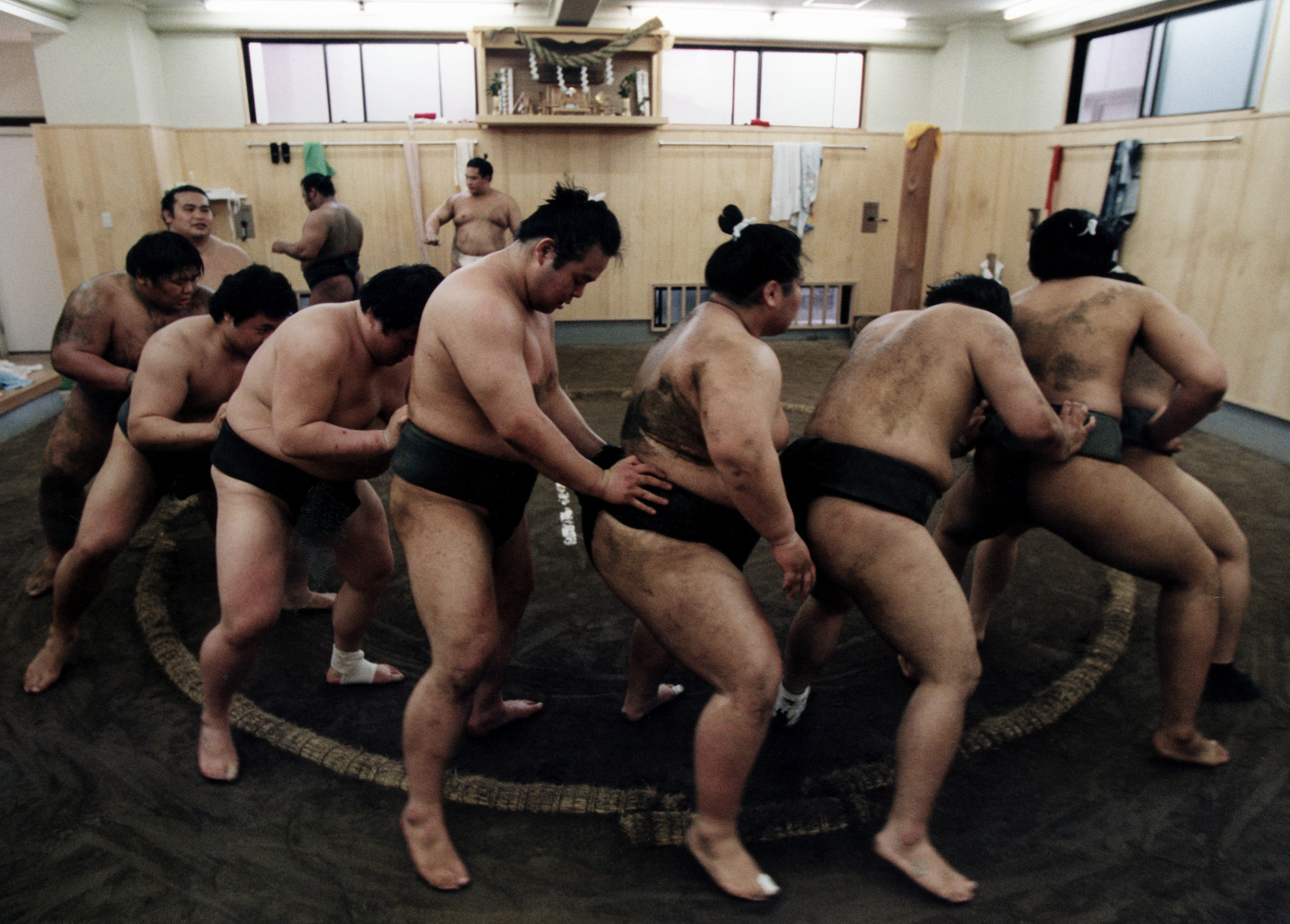
Training session in Tomozuma stable in 1998

The cornerstone of stable life is training (often early in the morning). Wrestlers ranked in the lower divisions get up at dawn (usually around four or five) to do morning chores around the building and stretch in preparation for the daily empty-stomach morning training. The morning exercises done are designed to exhaust wrestlers and strengthen their fighting spirit, and are repeated every morning without exception. Gradually by rank, the wrestlers join in the training and the stablemaster only appears once the sandanme wrestlers have started training. Sekitori-ranked wrestlers always turn up last at training sessions, often around eight o'clock, and their assistants have to temporarily leave the training to help them put on their mawashi. On arrival at the training hall, sekitori are systematically greeted by wrestlers of lower rank.

During the sekitori practice, the stable cooks begin to prepare a meal (usually chankonabe), which is traditionally an imposing dish and the first meal of the day. The chankoban (ちゃんこ番), or meal preparation, is a rotating task that includes shopping the day before, preparing the meal and making sure the kitchen is clean after use. Usually, the cooking brigade is supervised by a senior and experienced low-ranking wrestler, the chanko-cho, who is often referred to as ojii-chan (おじいちゃん; lit. 'grandpa'). Although chankonabe recipes have been homogenized, each stable is known for its specific recipe. After practice, the wrestlers take baths according to their status, with the better ranked beginning to bathe first, so that the sekitori always benefit from a clean bathroom. Wrestlers eat by turns according to rank. The sekitori are served by makushita wrestlers, who are in turn served by sandamme wrestlers, and so on. The lowest ranks, who were up and working before anyone else, must wait until all of the others have finished and gone upstairs to have a siesta-like nap. Within the stable, only wrestlers who have qualified as sekitori have the right to a private room, with the rest of the wrestlers sleeping in a dormitory-like communal room. Since the vast majority of wrestlers live in this room, it often lacks space and can only accommodate a futon and a few personal belongings. Even the sekitori's private rooms can seem small by Western standards. Wrestlers who have obtained the right to marry may move out of the stable to live with their spouse. During the COVID-19 outbreak, sumo stables were particularly closely monitored because of their communal living system, which is particularly conducive to the development of the virus.

During the afternoon hours, the non-sekitori wrestlers often take on other tasks, such as cleaning the entire stable and the baths, emptying the garbage cans or doing the laundry and drying the used mawashi. After these chores, it is not unusual for a stable to be perfectly silent. Afternoon periods are generally devoted to relations with support organizations and fan clubs, hobbies, or taking care of a family, if a wrestler has obtained the right to marry. On the evening of the end of a tournament, the stables organize an uchiage, a party including all stable members and patron groups.

=== New evolutions ===
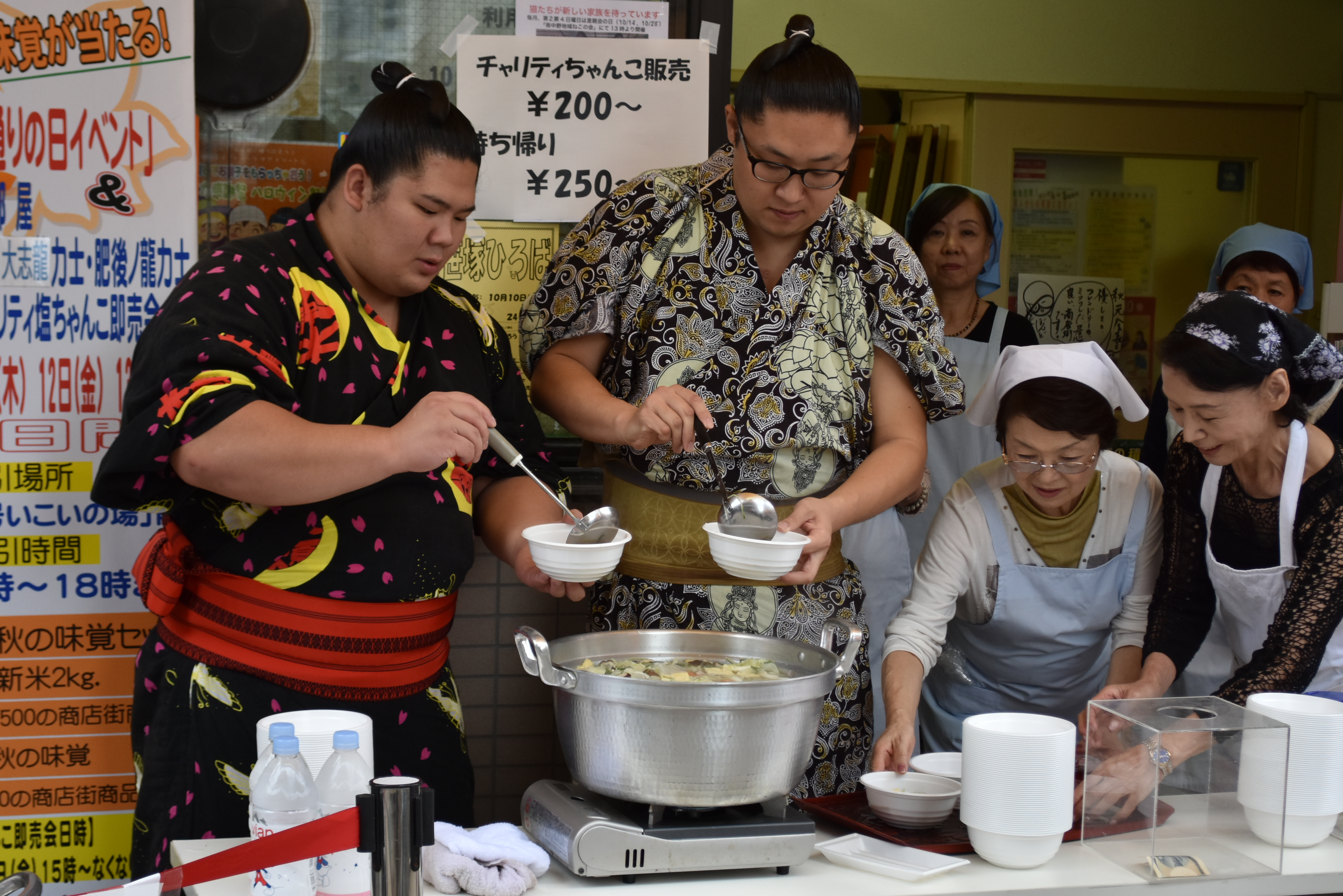
A charity sale of chankonabe (stew) by Kise stable wrestlers (left: Ura, then relegated to sandanme) in 2018

In the 1970s, the male-dominated environment of the stables created a number of problems, including frequent police interventions for public drunkenness, disorderly conduct, brawling, and inappropriate behavior towards women. In recent years, however, the stable system has been gradually reinventing itself. Fans prefer wrestlers with a different image, and the disciplinary regime required by the Sumo Association for its stables is sometimes considered stricter than in the rest of Japanese society.

The new developments involve changes to the traditional hierarchical structure of the stables and in the tasks performed by each individual. It is no longer unusual to see food advisors (like in Nishonoseki stable) or professional cooks (Hidenoyama stable) operating to enable better dietary monitoring of wrestlers. As early as the 1990s, stablemasters and okamisan also began to take part in housekeeping and cooking activities, whereas in previous decades these tasks had been assigned exclusively to low-ranking wrestlers.

Many stablemasters now arrange the buildings of their stables in a less traditional way, in order to make life easier for their wrestlers. Some stablemasters now do sport-related degrees before opening their own stable, such as the former Kisenosato (Waseda University) and Kotoōshū (Nippon Sport Science University).

It is becoming increasingly common for stables to be involved in partnerships and cooperation agreements. These partnerships often aim to cooperate further in a wide range of areas, including tourism, culture, sports, and educational promotion, and work closely to revitalize local communities. This was particularly the case for Ōshima stable, Kokonoe stable and Futagoyama stable that signed a partnership and cooperation agreement with the Katsushika Ward of Tokyo. The Asahiyama stable, with a view to asserting itself as a community center, founded back-to-back an animal shelter and a bakery in 2021. For its part, Oshiogawa stable opted for an apartment complex (the Creative House Bunka) mixing rental apartments with stable quarters. The initiative was taken to strengthen social ties in the neighborhood, and Oshiogawa stable provides access to morning training sessions and organizes chanko dinners for residents and photo sessions with babies.

In contrast to the secretive reputation of professional sumo, it has become common practice for stables to welcome visitors to watch training sessions. Spectators can attend free of charge, although rules vary from stable to stable, as to the size of the group and whether advance notice or a Japanese speaker are required. In addition to occasional visitors, the stables regularly welcome elementary and junior high students during the summer vacations as part of the "Open sumo stable" program organized by the Sumo Association. Finally, a growing number of heya are launching YouTube channels, broadcasting training sessions and introducing the wrestlers who make up their stables. This medium has become popular because it also allows viewers to satisfy their need for sumo content without having to rely on television broadcasts, publications affected by time differences, or the overall lack of ticket availability for the general public.

== See also ==
- Glossary of sumo terms
- List of sumo stables - a list of active heya.
- List of sumo elders
- Yobidashi
- Tokoyama
