= Naki Sumo Crying Baby Festival =

Annual Japanese festival

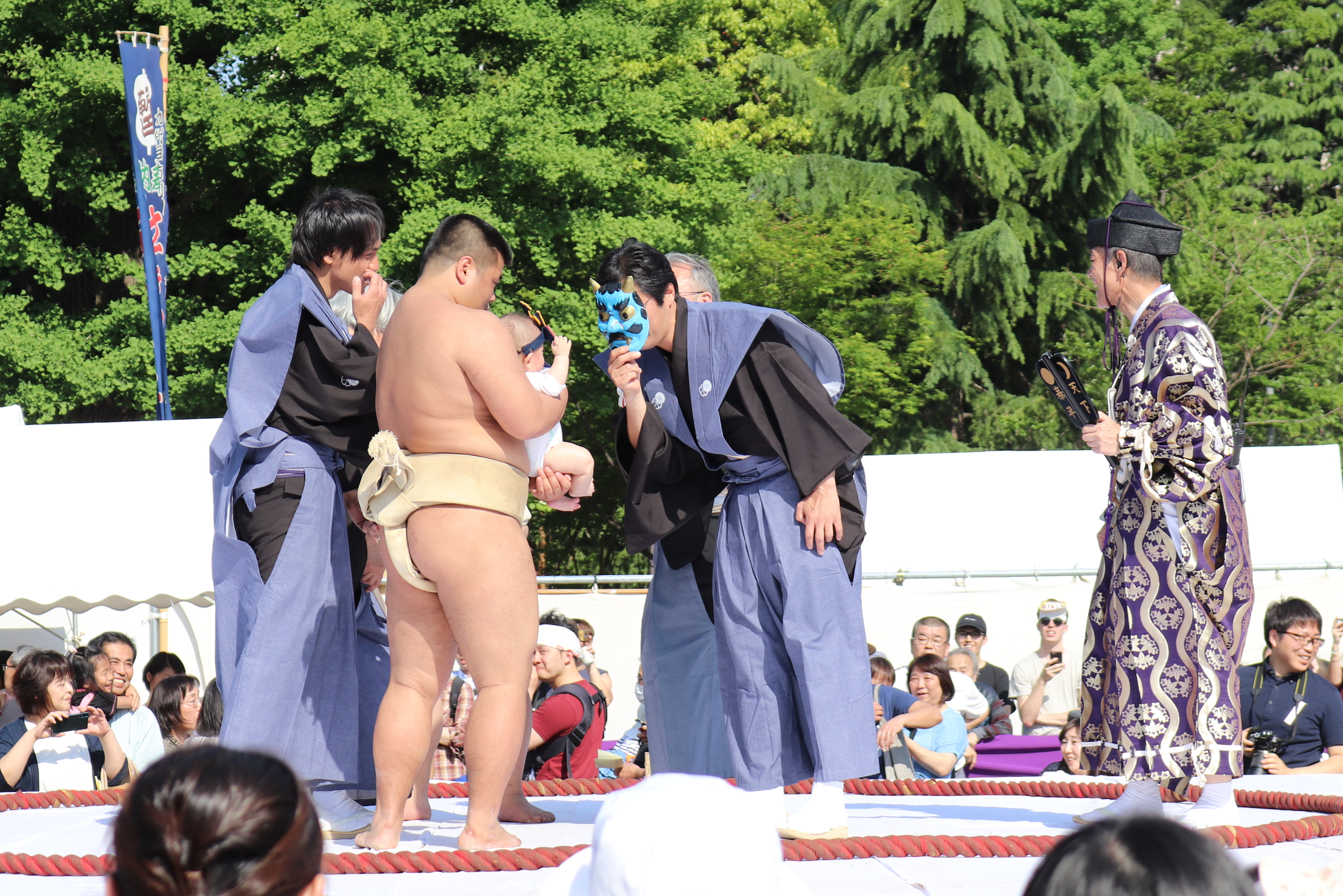
- Naki Sumo at the Sensō-ji in Tokyo, 2018
- Official name: Nakizumo
- Also called: Crying Baby Festival
- Observed by: Japanese people
- Type: religious, cultural
- Significance: During high point of spring, on Children's Day
- Observances: Contest between infants in a sumo ring
- Date: May 5
- Frequency: Annual
- Related to: Children's Day

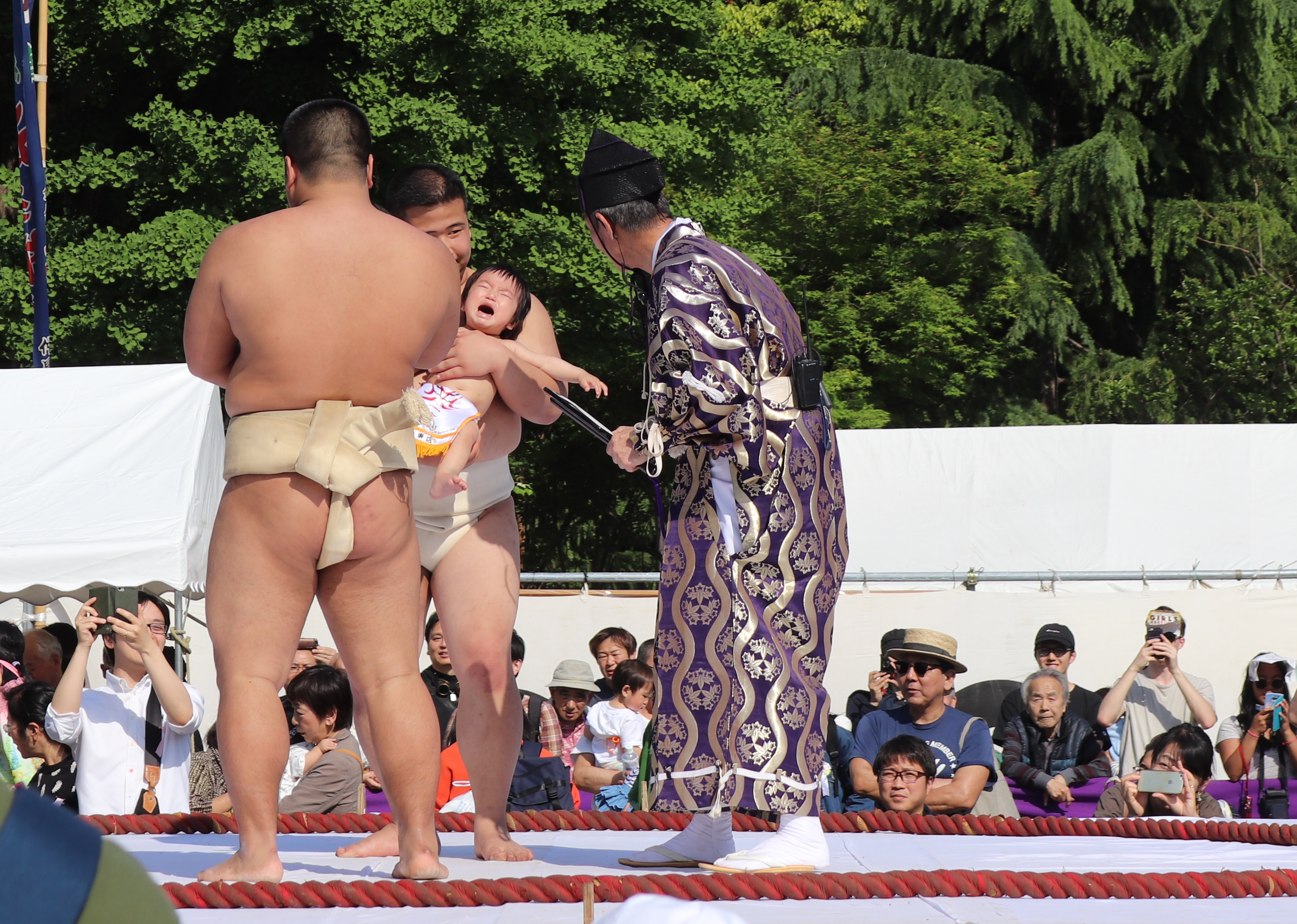
A referee evaluates the strength and volume of each contestant's cry.

The Naki Sumo Crying Baby Festival (Japanese: 泣き相撲, Hepburn: Nakisumo) is an annual Japanese festival in which sumo wrestlers in a sumo ring hold babies in their arms and attempt to make them cry, with upsetting faces and sounds. The first baby to start crying is proclaimed the winner. In Japanese folklore, strong and loud crying is seen as a sign of healthy baby growth and believed to ward off evil spirits.

== History ==
The Naki Sumo Festival has been held throughout Japan for over 400 years. The festival is considered to have origins in the folk belief that the loud cry of an innocent baby has the power to ward off demons or evil spirits. The Japanese proverb naku ko wa sodatsu, meaning "crying babies grow fastest", is an additional source of inspiration for the festival.

== Current practice ==
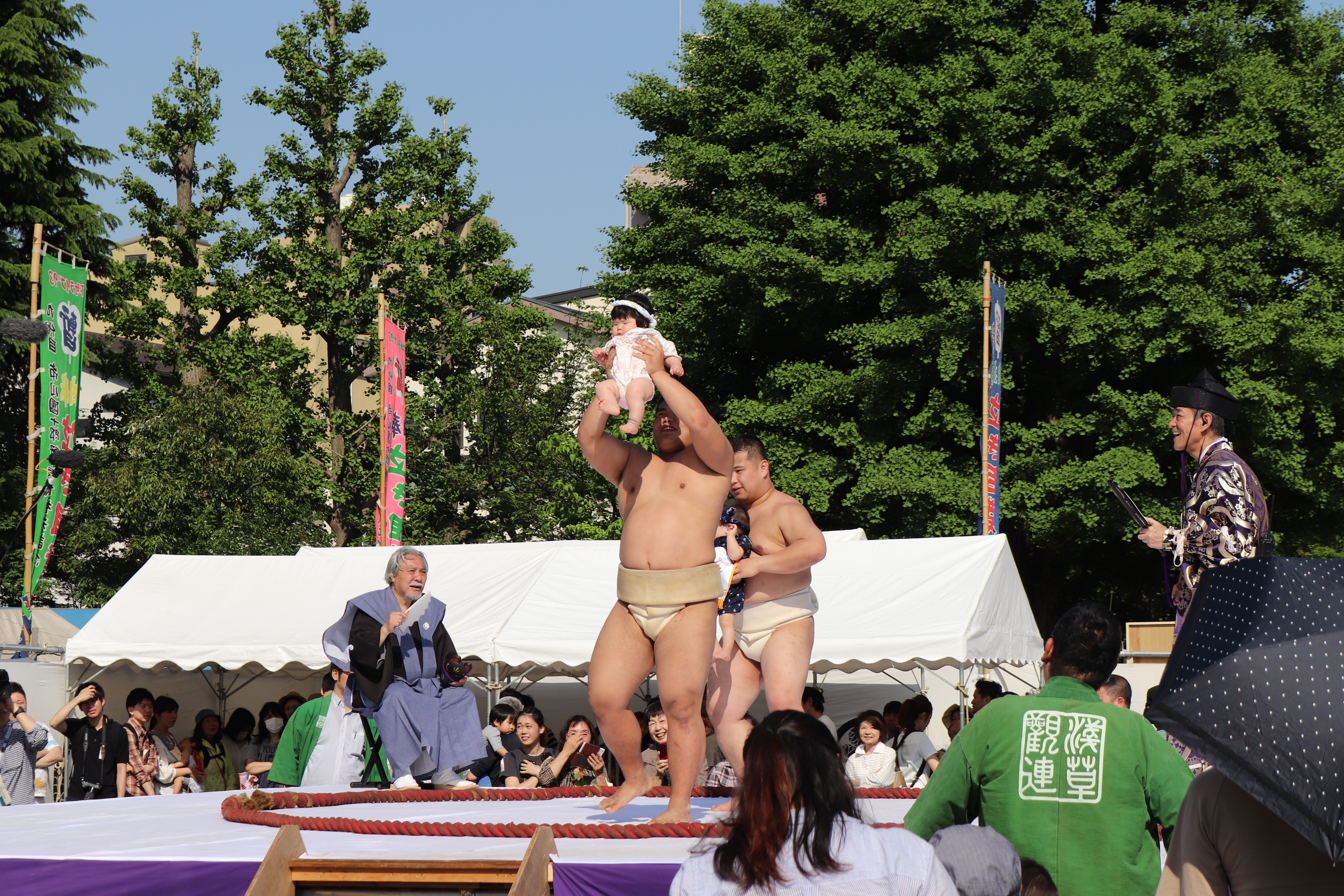
The winning child is raised high in the air by a sumo wrestler at the Sensoji Temple in Asakusa, Tokyo.

The Naki Sumo Festival is held annually at Shinto shrines throughout Japan, most commonly on or around May 5 to coincide with Children's Day at the end of the Golden Week holiday. The specific customs and traditions of each festival vary by location, but the main focus of every festival is a ritualistic prayer for the good health of each baby and a competition between infants held in a sumo wrestling ring.

A Shinto priest opens each festival with rituals to pray for the healthy growth of each baby. The staff at the shrine hand-make four-pronged kabuto helmets for each participant to wear during the crying competition and create commemorative gifts and souvenirs for the parents. Next, the crying baby competition is held outdoors in a handmade sumo ring. Two babies at a time compete in short matches, while held in the arms of professional or student sumo wrestlers. The first child to cry is declared the winner and bestowed with a blessing of good health. If both children cry simultaneously, the baby with the louder or longer cry is typically the victor.

Sumo wrestlers employ a variety of techniques to encourage crying, including bouncing the baby in their arms, making loud noises and funny or scary facial expressions, and chanting "Naki! Naki! Naki!" ("Cry! Cry! Cry!" in English). In some versions of the festival, when neither baby has cried for a number of minutes, referees or judges donning traditional Japanese masks approach the babies and attempt to scare them. At the end of each match, some families and spectators yell out the phrase banzai raku meaning "live long".

The best-known Naki Sumo Festival is held each year in Asakusa, Tokyo, where student sumo wrestlers of the Sensō-ji temple hold the babies in their arms. When the babies begin to cry, the student wrestlers raise the babies higher in the air, which is believed to strengthen the blessing endowed on each crying child. At the Gokoku Shrine in Hiroshima, babies are dressed in kimono and seated facing one another on pillows while a sumo referee encourages the babies to cry. Eligible competitors must be between the ages of 6 months and 18 months at the time of the festival. Around 100 babies compete each year.

The festival is free and open to the public; however, some shrines and temples require that parents submit an application or pay a fee to participate. Some locations are so popular that children are chosen by lottery, and parents will travel across Japan to find a place to participate. While the majority of participants are Japanese, some foreigners have traveled to Japan to partake in the festival. CNN interviewed a Japanese-American couple who flew from New York to attend the festival in Asakusa in 2010.

As a consequence of the COVID-19 pandemic in Japan, many Naki Sumo Festivals scheduled for spring 2020 were cancelled or postponed until fall.
