= Wakanoumi Masateru II =

Japanese sumo wrestler (1945–1995)

Personal information
- Native name: 若ノ海 正照
- Born: Akio Matsuda; October 25, 1945 Ōhasama, Iwate, Japan
- Died: March 31, 1995 (aged 49)
- Height: 1.75 m (5 ft 9 in)
- Weight: 122 kg (269 lb; 19.2 st)

Sport
- Sport: Sumo
- Retired: January, 1978
- Heya: Hanakago
- Record: 493-488-16
- Debut: May, 1961
- Highest rank: Maegashira 2 (January, 1973)
- Elder name: Ōtake
- Championships: 1 (Jūryō)
- Updated on June 2020

Wakanoumi Masateru II (born Akio Matsuda; October 25, 1945 – March 31, 1995) was a sumo wrestler from Ōhasama, Iwate, Japan.

== Career ==
He made his professional debut in May 1961 and was given ex-komusubi Wakanoumi's old shikona when he was promoted to jūryō. However, he had an inauspicious jūryō debut, winning only two of his fifteen matches. After briefly returning to his family name of Matsuda he earned four consecutive winning record in the makushita division to return to jūryō in November 1971. He won the jūryō division yūshō or championship in May 1972 with a 12–3 record. He reached the top makuuchi division in July 1972, after 11 years and two months in sumo and 67 tournaments after his professional debut. His highest rank was maegashira 2. He never managed double-digit wins in a top division tournament, and did not earn any special prizes or gold stars. However, he did defeat ōzeki Takanohana in March 1974. After suffering a dislocated ankle in the summer tour of 1977 he missed the September 1977 tournament and was demoted back to jūryō.

== Retirement from sumo ==
Upon retirement from active competition in January 1978 he became an elder in the Japan Sumo Association under the name Ōtake and worked at Taihō stable (the Ōtake name was owned by Taihō). He left the Sumo Association in May 1992, when the Ōtake elder stock was needed by the retiring Ōzutsu. After leaving sumo he ran a chankonabe restaurant in Tokyo's Kōtō ward and in 1993 appeared semi-regularly as a sumo trainer in the Hirari daytime drama series featured on NHK's Asadora. He died of heart failure in a Shibuya hospital on March 31, 1995, at the age of 49. He is buried in a temple in Hanamaki, Iwate.

== Family ==
Two of his sons were sumo wrestlers - former makushita Kachimori (born 1977) of Isenoumi stable and former jonidan Wakashoho (born 1980) of the Taiho stable. Kachimori now runs a chanko bowl restaurant.

== Fighting style ==
He was a yotsu-sumo wrestler, and his most common winning techniques were yori-kiri (force out), uwatenage (overarm throw) and tsuri-dashi (lift out). He preferred a hidari-yotsu (right hand outside, left hand inside) grip on his opponent's mawashi.

== Career record ==
Wakanoumi Masateru II
Year	January Hatsu basho, Tokyo	March Haru basho, Osaka	May Natsu basho, Tokyo	July Nagoya basho, Nagoya	September Aki basho, Tokyo	November Kyūshū basho, Fukuoka
1961	x	x	(Maezumo)	East Jonokuchi #34; 3–4	West Jonokuchi #14; 3–4	West Jonokuchi #5; 4–3
1962	East Jonidan #54; 1–6	East Jonidan #86; 4–3	West Jonidan #61; 4–3	West Jonidan #35; 2–5	West Jonidan #59; 5–2	West Jonidan #14; 2–5
1963	East Jonidan #37; 3–4	West Jonidan #58; 3–4	West Jonidan #75; 6–1	East Sandanme #96; 4–3	East Sandanme #70; 5–2	East Sandanme #34; 2–5
1964	East Sandanme #55; 2–5	West Sandanme #79; 5–2	West Sandanme #43; 3–4	West Sandanme #46; 4–3	East Sandanme #31; 5–2	East Sandanme #4; 3–4
1965	West Sandanme #10; 5–2	West Makushita #76; 4–3	East Makushita #70; 3–4	East Makushita #75; 6–1	East Makushita #36; 3–3–1	West Makushita #41; 4–3
1966	West Makushita #38; 3–4	East Makushita #44; 3–4	East Makushita #49; 5–2	East Makushita #33; 3–4	West Makushita #39; 4–3	West Makushita #32; 5–2
1967	East Makushita #20; 3–4	West Makushita #23; 5–2	West Makushita #20; 3–4	West Makushita #22; 4–3	West Makushita #18; 3–4	West Makushita #22; 5–2
1968	West Makushita #13; 3–4	East Makushita #16; 2–5	East Makushita #27; 3–4	West Makushita #31; 5–2	West Makushita #21; 5–2	East Makushita #9; 4–3
1969	West Makushita #6; 4–3	East Makushita #4; 2–5	West Makushita #14; 6–1	East Makushita #4; 3–4	West Makushita #6; 3–4	West Makushita #9; 3–4
1970	East Makushita #12; 5–2	West Makushita #6; 3–4	West Makushita #8; 4–3	East Makushita #6; 3–4	East Makushita #9; 4–3	West Makushita #5; 5–2
1971	East Jūryō #13; 2–13	West Makushita #11; 4–3	West Makushita #9; 4–3	East Makushita #7; 5–2	East Makushita #1; 5–2	West Jūryō #11; 9–6
1972	East Jūryō #6; 6–9	West Jūryō #9; 10–5	West Jūryō #3; 12–3; Champion	East Maegashira #10; 8–7	East Maegashira #7; 8–7	East Maegashira #5; 8–7
1973	East Maegashira #2; 4–11	West Maegashira #9; 8–7	East Maegashira #8; 7–8	East Maegashira #10; 8–7	West Maegashira #7; 9–6	West Maegashira #3; 5–10
1974	West Maegashira #5; 8–7	East Maegashira #3; 7–8	West Maegashira #4; 6–9	West Maegashira #8; 8–7	West Maegashira #5; 8–7	East Maegashira #3; 4–11
1975	West Maegashira #10; 2–13	West Jūryō #4; 6–9	West Jūryō #9; 8–7	East Jūryō #6; 8–7	West Jūryō #4; 9–6	East Jūryō #1; 5–10
1976	West Jūryō #5; 8–7	West Jūryō #2; 9–6	West Jūryō #1; 5–10	West Jūryō #6; 8–7	East Jūryō #4; 10–5–P	West Maegashira #11; 7–8
1977	East Maegashira #13; 9–6	West Maegashira #5; 6–9	West Maegashira #8; 8–7	East Maegashira #5; 6–9	East Maegashira #9; Sat out due to injury 0–0–15	East Jūryō #7; 5–10
1978	East Makushita #1; Retired –	x	x	x	x	x
Record given as wins–losses–absences Top division champion Top division runner-up Retired Lower divisions Non-participation Sanshō key: F=Fighting spirit; O=Outstanding performance; T=Technique Also shown: ★=Kinboshi; P=Playoff(s); Divisions: Makuuchi — Jūryō — Makushita — Sandanme — Jonidan — Jonokuchi Makuuchi ranks: Yokozuna — Ōzeki — Sekiwake — Komusubi — Maegashira

== See also ==
- Glossary of sumo terms
- List of past sumo wrestlers
- List of sumo tournament second division champions
