= Shinto origins of sumo =

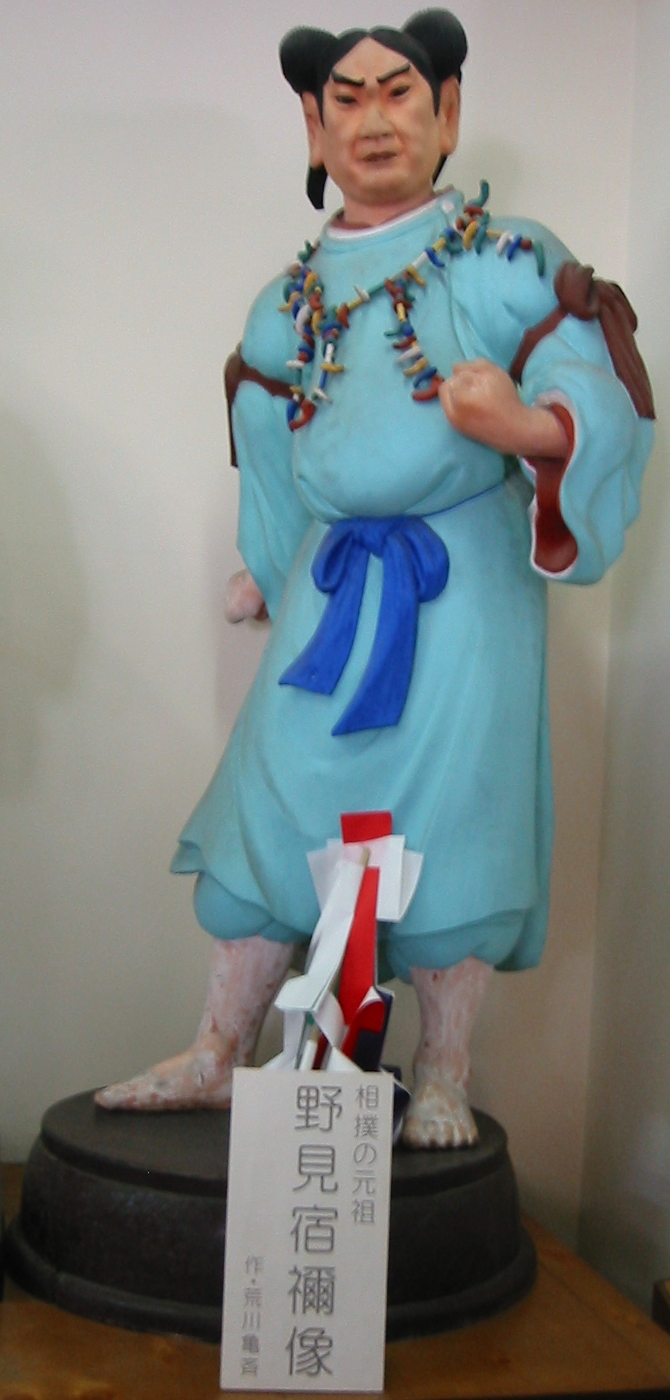
God of sumo, Nomi no Sukune

The Shinto origins of sumo can easily be traced back through the centuries and many current sumo rituals are directly handed down from Shinto rituals. The Shinto religion has historically been used as a means to express Japanese nationalism and ethnic identity, especially prior to the end of World War II. In its association with Shinto, sumo has also been seen as a bulwark of Japanese tradition.

Sumo can be traced back to ancient Shinto rituals to ensure a bountiful harvest and honor the spirits known as kami. In modern times, the canopy over the sumo ring, called the dohyō, is reminiscent of a Shinto shrine, the officiator is dressed in garb very similar to that of a Shinto priest, and the throwing of salt before a bout is believed to purify the ring.

Prior to becoming a professional sport in the Tokugawa period, sumo was originally performed on the grounds of a shrine or temple. The present dohyō, which is still considered sacred, is in honor of the days when matches were held on the sacred grounds of shrines and temples. The roof over the dohyō called yakata originally represented the sky for the purpose of emphasizing the sacred nature of dohyō, which symbolizes the earth. On the day before the beginning of each tournament, the dohyō-matsuri, a ring-blessing ceremony, is performed by sumo officials called gyōji. They are the referees on the dohyō who judge each sumo match. Their elaborate, colorful costumes are based on ceremonial court robes of the Heian period (AD 794 – 1185). Also their black hats are exact copies of the hats worn by Shinto priests depicted in various Heian art. Dressed in the white robes of a Shinto priest, gyōji purify and bless the dohyō in a solemn ceremony during which salt, kelp, dried squid and chestnuts are buried in the center of the dohyō. Observing officials and invited guests drink sake, a traditional Japanese alcoholic drink, as it is offered to each one in turn. The remaining sake is poured over the straw boundary of the dohyō as an offering to the gods. Shinto ritual continues to pervade every aspect of sumo. Before a tournament, two gyōji functioning as Shinto priests enact a ritual to consecrate the newly constructed dohyō.

Each day of the tournament the dohyō-iri, or ring-entering ceremonies performed by the top divisions before the start of their wrestling day are derived from sumo rituals. This ceremony involves them ascending the dohyō, walking around the edge and facing the audience. They then turn and face inwards, clap their hands, raise one hand, slightly lift the ceremonial aprons called kesho-mawashi, and raise both hands, then continue walking around the dohyō as they leave the same way they came in. This clapping ritual is an important Shinto element and reminiscent of the clapping in Shinto shrines designed to attract the attention of the gods. The yokozuna's ring-entering ceremony is regarded as a purification ritual in its own right, and is occasionally performed at Shinto shrines for this purpose. Every newly promoted yokozuna performs his first ring-entering ceremony at the Meiji Shrine in Tokyo.

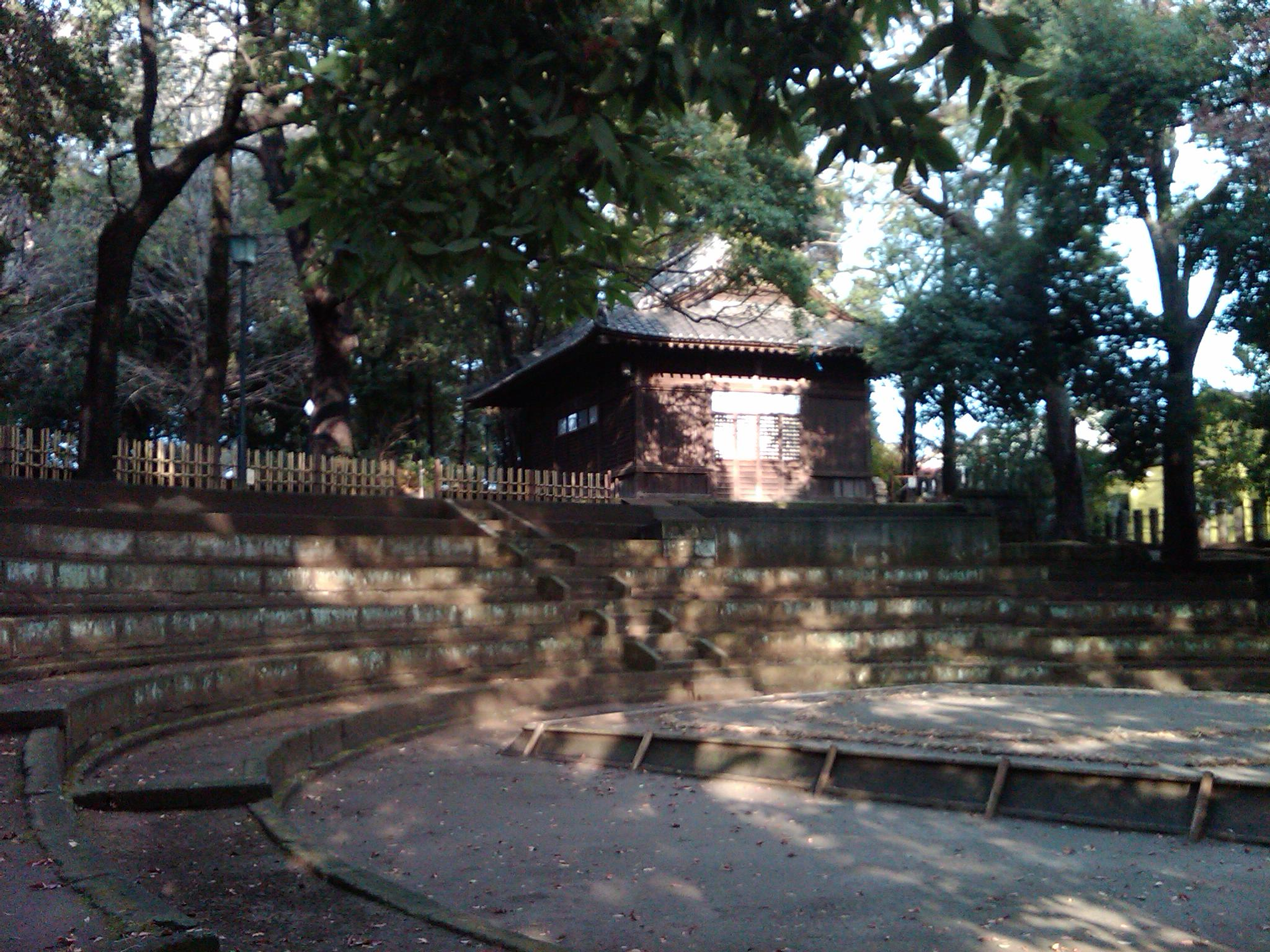
Ceremonial sumo wrestling ring at Setagaya Hachiman shrine in Tokyo
