= Kōtetsuyama =

Kōtetsuyama is a given name. Notable people with the name include:

- Kōtetsuyama Toyoya (1942–1996), Japanese sumo wrestler, former sekiwake
- Kōtetsuyama Keisuke (1956–2018), Japanese sumo wrestler, former komusubi
