= Daiju Hisateru =

Sumo wrestler

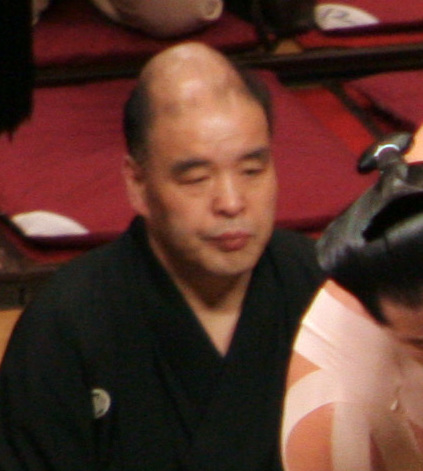

Personal information
- Native name: 大受久晃
- Born: Toshiaki Sakaiya; 19 March 1950 (age 76) Hokkaidō, Japan
- Height: 1.77 m (5 ft 9 1/2 in)
- Weight: 150 kg (330 lb)

Sport
- Sport: Sumo
- Retired: May, 1977
- Heya: Takashima
- Record: 462–388–31
- Debut: March, 1965
- Highest rank: Ōzeki (September, 1973)
- Elder name: Asahiyama
- Championships: 1 (Jūryō)
- Special Prizes: Technique (6); Outstanding Performance (4); Fighting Spirit (1)
- Updated on June 2020

Daiju Hisateru (born 19 March 1950 as Toshiaki Sakaiya) is a former sumo wrestler from Hokkaidō, Japan. His highest rank was ōzeki, but he held the rank for only five tournaments – fewer than any ōzeki in the modern era until Mitakeumi, who held the rank of ōzeki for only four tournaments in 2022. He won eleven sanshō or special prizes during his top division career which lasted from 1970 to 1977. He was the head coach of Asahiyama stable from 1997 until 2015.

== Career ==
Born in Setana, he joined the small Takashima stable run by former ōzeki Mitsuneyama in March 1965. He reached the top makuuchi division in May 1970 after winning the jūryō division championship with a 14–1 record. He was awarded the Technique Prize in his first top division tournament. He was to win a total of eleven special prizes in his career, which at the time was second only to Tsurugamine's fourteen. His six prizes for Technique put him in equal sixth place on the all-time list, as of 2009. In March 1971 he made his san'yaku debut at sekiwake and defeated his first yokozuna, Taihō.

He earned promotion to ōzeki in 1973 after three consecutive double figure scores. He was a runner-up in the May 1973 tournament to Wajima with a score of 11–4 and defeated two more yokozuna, Kotozakura and Kitanofuji (the latter for the first time in twelve attempts). He did even better in July, defeating Kitanofuji again and finishing in third place on 13–2. He had a clean sweep of all three special prizes, the first wrestler ever to achieve this, and ōzeki promotion was confirmed. However, he was unable to prove himself worthy of champion rank. He had to pull out injured from his debut ōzeki tournament and held the rank for only five tournaments before being demoted. He was never able to return, and though he remained at sekiwake for four tournaments he then fell back to the maegashira ranks.

After a 4–11 score in March 1977 he finished his career back in the jūryō division, the first former ōzeki ever to compete at such a low rank. After three straight losses he pulled out of the May 1977 tournament and announced his retirement at the age of just 27.

== Fighting style ==
Daiju was very much an oshi-sumo specialist, preferring pushes and thrusts to the opponent's chest rather than fighting on the mawashi or belt. His most common winning technique by far was oshidashi, a simple push out, which accounted for half his victories at sekitori level.

== Retirement from sumo ==
After his retirement he became an elder of the Japan Sumo Association under the name Tateyama, and worked as a coach at his old stable until it closed in 1982 due to the ill health of his old coach. He then worked at Kumagatani stable until it too shut down in 1996, upon which he was transferred to Tatsunami stable. After twenty years as an assistant coach, in May 1997 he was asked to become head coach of the Asahiyama stable after the sudden death of the previous stablemaster, former komusubi Wakafutase, and he adopted the name Asahiyama. Daimanazuru briefly made the top division in 2006 and Tokusegawa was a member of the stable for a short time after it absorbed Kiriyama stable in 2011, but there were no more sekitori after his retirement. Asahiyama also worked as a judge of tournament bouts. Asahiyama stable was shut down in January 2015 as Asahiyama approached the mandatory retirement age of 65, and he moved to Asakayama stable. He left the Sumo Association in March 2015, opting not to be re-employed for five years for a consultancy role as allowed by a rule change in 2014. Instead the Asahiyama elder name was acquired by former sekiwake Kotonishiki.

He had a pronounced dome on his head, due to him injecting silicone to meet the Sumo Association's height requirements when he was first recruited as a wrestler. It was removed in 2010.

== Career record ==
Daiju Hisateru
Year	January Hatsu basho, Tokyo	March Haru basho, Osaka	May Natsu basho, Tokyo	July Nagoya basho, Nagoya	September Aki basho, Tokyo	November Kyūshū basho, Fukuoka
1965	x	(Maezumo)	West Jonokuchi #20; 5–2	West Jonidan #93; 2–5	East Jonidan #108; 4–3	East Jonidan #64; 6–1
1966	West Jonidan #5; 4–3	West Sandanme #90; 2–5	West Jonidan #15; 5–2	East Sandanme #66; 3–4	West Sandanme #79; 4–3	West Sandanme #44; 6–1
1967	West Sandanme #6; 5–2	West Makushita #80; 4–3	West Sandanme #17; 6–1	West Makushita #42; 5–2	West Makushita #26; 2–5	East Makushita #37; 6–1
1968	East Makushita #17; 6–1	West Makushita #9; 4–3	East Makushita #6; 3–4	East Makushita #9; 3–4	West Makushita #14; 3–4	East Makushita #20; 4–3
1969	East Makushita #16; 4–3	East Makushita #13; 5–2	East Makushita #6; 5–2	East Makushita #2; 6–1	West Jūryō #10; 10–5	East Jūryō #4; 6–9
1970	East Jūryō #9; 12–3	West Jūryō #1; 14–1; Champion	East Maegashira #6; 9–6; T	West Maegashira #1; 6–9	East Maegashira #3; 7–8	West Maegashira #3; 5–6–4
1971	West Maegashira #5; 11–4; T	West Sekiwake #1; 8–7; O	East Sekiwake #1; 8–7; T	West Sekiwake #1; 4–11	West Maegashira #2; 6–9	West Maegashira #4; 8–7
1972	West Maegashira #1; 7–8	East Maegashira #3; 7–8	West Maegashira #4; 8–7	East Maegashira #3; 6–9	East Maegashira #4; 7–8	East Maegashira #6; 9–6
1973	East Maegashira #1; 10–5; T	East Komusubi #1; 10–5; O	East Sekiwake #1; 11–4; OT	East Sekiwake #1; 13–2; FOT	East Ōzeki #1; 2–6–7	West Ōzeki #2; 9–6
1974	West Ōzeki #1; 9–6	East Ōzeki #2; 4–5–6	West Ōzeki #2; 6–9	East Sekiwake #2; 9–6	West Sekiwake #1; 8–7	East Sekiwake #1; 9–6
1975	East Sekiwake #2; 4–11	East Maegashira #4; 8–7	East Maegashira #2; 7–8	West Maegashira #3; 4–2–9	West Maegashira #8; 5–10	East Maegashira #13; 9–6
1976	West Maegashira #7; 11–4	East Maegashira #2; 7–8	East Maegashira #3; 6–9	West Maegashira #6; 6–9	East Maegashira #9; 6–9	East Maegashira #11; 9–6
1977	West Maegashira #5; 6–9	East Maegashira #9; 4–11	West Jūryō #1; Retired; 0–4	x	x	x
Record given as wins–losses–absences Top division champion Top division runner-up Retired Lower divisions Non-participation Sanshō key: F=Fighting spirit; O=Outstanding performance; T=Technique Also shown: ★=Kinboshi; P=Playoff(s); Divisions: Makuuchi — Jūryō — Makushita — Sandanme — Jonidan — Jonokuchi Makuuchi ranks: Yokozuna — Ōzeki — Sekiwake — Komusubi — Maegashira

== See also ==
- Glossary of sumo terms
- List of sumo tournament top division runners-up
- List of sumo tournament second division champions
- List of past sumo wrestlers
- List of ōzeki
