= Teruzakura Hiroyuki =

Japanese sumo wrestler

Personal information
- Native name: 照櫻 弘行
- Born: Hiroyuki Ozaki; 5 December 1947 (age 78) Minoo, Osaka, Japan
- Height: 1.84 m (6 ft 1/2 in)
- Weight: 110 kg (240 lb)

Sport
- Sport: Sumo
- Retired: January, 1976
- Heya: Isegahama
- Record: 371-352-7
- Debut: May, 1964
- Highest rank: Maegashira 7 (September, 1970)
- Elder name: Urakaze
- Championships: 1 (Jonidan)
- Updated on June 2020

Teruzakura Hiroyuki (born 5 December 1947 as Hiroyuki Ozaki) is a former sumo wrestler from Minoo, Osaka, Japan. He made his professional debut in May 1964, and reached the top division in July 1970. He fought for five tournaments in the top division and his highest rank was maegashira 7. He retired in January 1976 and became an elder in the Japan Sumo Association under the name Urakaze, working as a coach at Isegahama stable, Kiriyama stable and Asahiyama stable until reaching the mandatory retirement age of 65 in December 2012. The Urakaze name is now held by former maegashira Shikishima.

== Career record ==
Teruzakura Hiroyuki
Year	January Hatsu basho, Tokyo	March Haru basho, Osaka	May Natsu basho, Tokyo	July Nagoya basho, Nagoya	September Aki basho, Tokyo	November Kyūshū basho, Fukuoka
1964	x	x	(Maezumo)	West Jonokuchi #10; 6–1	West Jonidan #66; 7–0–P; Champion	East Sandanme #35; 3–4
1965	East Sandanme #41; 4–3	East Sandanme #27; 4–3	West Sandanme #20; 4–3	East Sandanme #6; 5–2	West Makushita #83; 3–4	East Makushita #93; 4–3
1966	East Makushita #83; 5–2	East Makushita #63; 2–5	West Makushita #81; 4–3	West Makushita #71; 3–4	East Makushita #81; 6–1	West Makushita #46; 6–1
1967	West Makushita #24; 3–4	West Makushita #27; 5–2	East Makushita #24; 3–4	East Makushita #26; 3–4	West Makushita #32; 5–2	East Makushita #19; 4–3
1968	East Makushita #14; 2–5	East Makushita #31; 5–2	East Makushita #21; 4–3	West Makushita #15; 5–2	East Makushita #8; 3–4	West Makushita #10; 5–2
1969	West Makushita #4; 3–4	East Makushita #7; 4–3	East Makushita #4; 5–2	East Makushita #1; 4–3	West Jūryō #12; 9–6	West Jūryō #9; 9–6
1970	East Jūryō #4; 8–7	East Jūryō #1; 5–10	West Jūryō #4; 10–5	East Maegashira #13; 8–7	West Maegashira #7; 6–9	East Maegashira #10; 7–8
1971	East Jūryō #1; 8–7	East Maegashira #12; 9–6	West Maegashira #8; 4–11	West Jūryō #3; 6–9	West Jūryō #6; 1–12–2	East Makushita #8; 1–6
1972	West Makushita #29; 4–3	West Makushita #25; 5–2	East Makushita #15; 5–2	East Makushita #7; 5–2	West Makushita #1; 5–2	East Jūryō #11; 8–7
1973	East Jūryō #9; 10–5	East Jūryō #2; 6–9	West Jūryō #5; 8–7	West Jūryō #3; 6–9	East Jūryō #8; 8–7	West Jūryō #6; 7–8
1974	East Jūryō #8; 8–7	East Jūryō #5; 6–9	East Jūryō #8; 8–7	West Jūryō #6; 6–9	East Jūryō #9; 8–7	East Jūryō #7; 7–8
1975	West Jūryō #9; 8–7	East Jūryō #8; 7–8	West Jūryō #10; 8–7	East Jūryō #8; 2–13	West Makushita #8; 4–3	East Makushita #6; 2–5
1976	East Makushita #20; Retired; 0–2–5	x	x	x	x	x
Record given as wins–losses–absences Top division champion Top division runner-up Retired Lower divisions Non-participation Sanshō key: F=Fighting spirit; O=Outstanding performance; T=Technique Also shown: ★=Kinboshi; P=Playoff(s); Divisions: Makuuchi — Jūryō — Makushita — Sandanme — Jonidan — Jonokuchi Makuuchi ranks: Yokozuna — Ōzeki — Sekiwake — Komusubi — Maegashira

== See also ==
- Glossary of sumo terms
- List of past sumo wrestlers
