= Daimanazuru Kenji =

Sumo wrestler

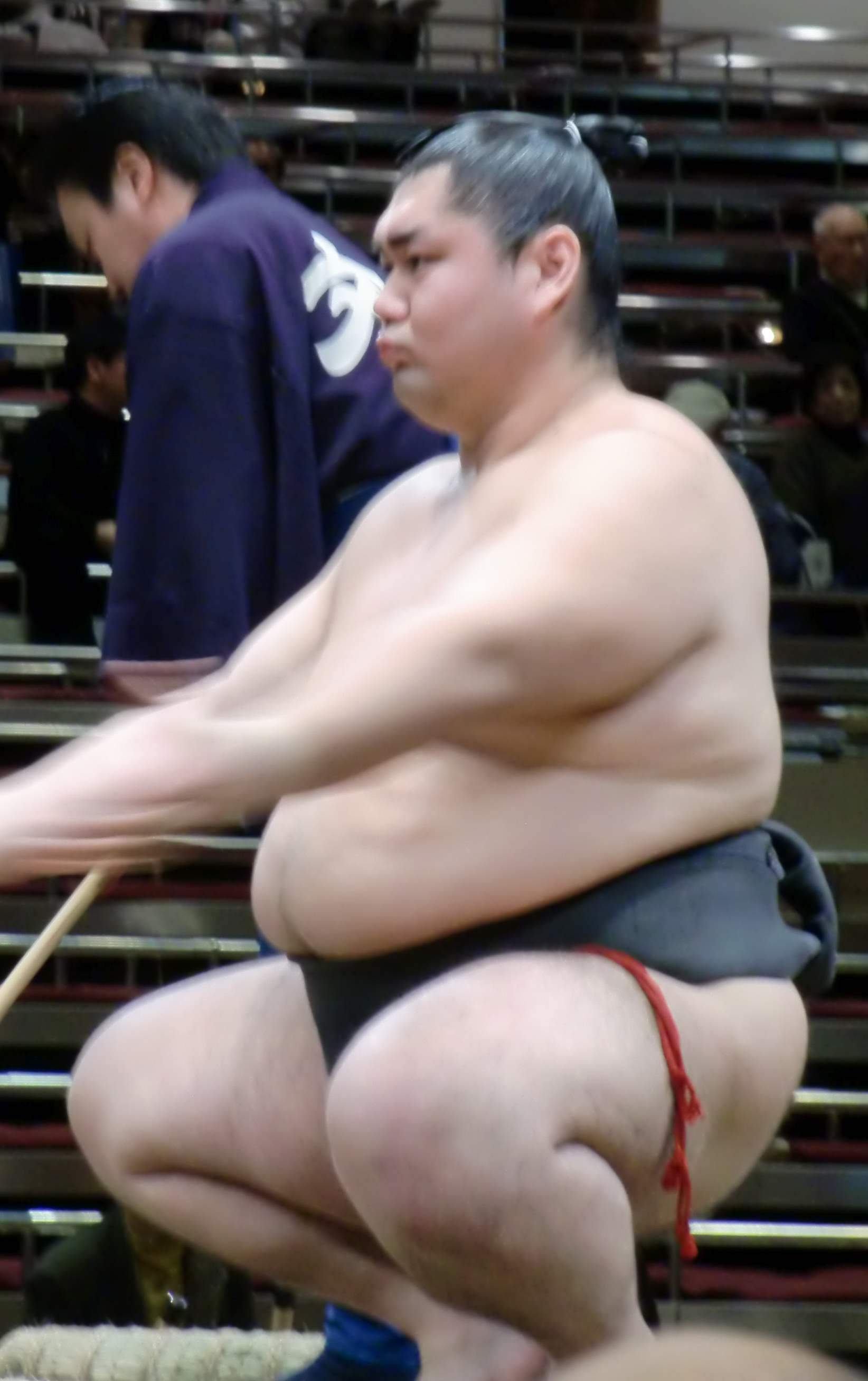
- Daimanazuru during his final tournament in January 2010

Personal information
- Native name: 大真鶴 健司
- Born: Kenji Omae; January 16, 1977 (age 49) Nara, Japan
- Height: 1.89 m (6 ft 2 1/2 in)
- Weight: 170 kg (370 lb)

Sport
- Sport: Sumo
- Retired: January 2010
- Heya: Asahiyama
- Record: 443-436-15
- Debut: May 1992
- Highest rank: Maegashira 16 (July, 2006)
- Championships: 2 (Makushita)
- Updated on January 2010

Daimanazuru Kenji (born January 16, 1977, as Kenji Omae) is a former sumo wrestler from Kawakami, Yoshino District, Nara, Japan. He began his professional career in 1992, and spent a total of 19 tournaments in the top two divisions, peaking at maegashira 16 in 2006. He retired at the end of the January 2010 tournament and chose to work outside of the Japan Sumo Association.

== Career ==
He made his professional debut in May 1992, joining Asahiyama stable, then run by the former wrestler Wakafutase. In 1997 his stablemaster died suddenly and for the remainder of his career he was coached by former ozeki Daiju. He initially fought under his own surname of Omae, before adopting the shikona of Futasewaka in 1994. He switched to his familiar name of Daimanazuru at the beginning of 2000.

He reached sekitori status in November 2003, after more than eleven years in the unsalaried divisions, by winning the makushita tournament championship or yusho with a perfect 7-0 record. He was the first wrestler from Asahiyama stable to be promoted to jūryō since the new head coach took over in 1997. He made his jūryō debut alongside future yokozuna Hakuho. After two losing scores in January and March 2004 he slipped back to makushita, but he returned to jūryō in January 2005. He made steady progress, rising slowly up the jūryō division with a succession of 8-7 scores, which was enough to earn him promotion to the top makuuchi division for the July 2006 tournament. It had taken him 85 tournaments to reach makuuchi from his professional debut, the seventh slowest ever. His single tournament there saw him win only two bouts, against veterans Buyuzan and Tochisakae, and he was demoted straight back to jūryō.

In September 2007 he suffered an eye injury and had to withdraw on the 4th day, resulting in demotion back to the unsalaried makushita division. By July 2008 he had fallen to Makushita 26, the same rung on the ladder as fellow former top division wrestler Takahama. He scored six wins against one loss in that tournament however, and took part in an eight-way playoff for the makushita championship. He missed out on his third title, eliminated in the semifinal stage by Yamamotoyama. Restricted by a nagging shoulder injury, a series of mediocre performances after that saw him fall to Makushita 54 for the January 2010 basho, his lowest rank since entering the makushita division at the end of 1997. Despite recording 4 wins against 3 losses, he announced his retirement after the tournament at the age of 33. He did not fight in enough sekitori tournaments to qualify for a toshiyori (elder) position, and left the sumo world to work in a Tokyo-based firm.

== Fighting style ==
Daimanazuru had a straightforward fighting style, with around 70% of his wins being either yorikiri (force out) or oshidashi (push out). He preferred a migi-yotsu grip on the mawashi, with his left hand outside and right hand inside his opponent's arms.

== Family ==
He announced his engagement in May 2006.

== Career record ==
Daimanazuru Kenji
Year	January Hatsu basho, Tokyo	March Haru basho, Osaka	May Natsu basho, Tokyo	July Nagoya basho, Nagoya	September Aki basho, Tokyo	November Kyūshū basho, Fukuoka
1992	x	x	(Maezumo)	West Jonokuchi #60; 4–3	West Jonokuchi #15; 2–5	West Jonokuchi #28; 3–4
1993	East Jonokuchi #27; 1–6	East Jonokuchi #36; 3–4	West Jonidan #180; 5–2	West Jonidan #126; 2–5	East Jonidan #156; 2–5	West Jonokuchi #4; 5–2
1994	East Jonidan #133; 4–3	West Jonidan #104; 2–5	East Jonidan #136; 4–3	East Jonidan #111; 4–3	West Jonidan #82; 4–3	West Jonidan #57; 6–1
1995	East Sandanme #95; 3–4	East Jonidan #15; 3–4	West Jonidan #32; 5–2	West Sandanme #90; 4–3	East Sandanme #76; 3–4	East Sandanme #91; 3–4
1996	East Jonidan #13; 5–2	East Sandanme #77; 4–3	East Sandanme #57; 3–4	West Sandanme #73; 4–3	West Sandanme #54; 5–2	West Sandanme #24; 4–3
1997	West Sandanme #11; 2–5	East Sandanme #37; 3–4	East Sandanme #57; 5–2	East Sandanme #23; 4–3	West Sandanme #10; 6–1	West Makushita #37; 3–4
1998	East Makushita #49; 4–3	West Makushita #37; 4–3	West Makushita #28; 4–3	West Makushita #23; 3–4	East Makushita #31; 5–2	East Makushita #18; 5–2
1999	East Makushita #8; 2–5	East Makushita #19; 4–3	East Makushita #14; 3–4	West Makushita #19; 3–4	East Makushita #24; 2–5	East Makushita #37; 4–3
2000	East Makushita #32; 3–4	West Makushita #41; 3–4	West Makushita #51; 5–2	West Makushita #36; 5–2	West Makushita #23; 5–2	East Makushita #10; 4–3
2001	West Makushita #7; 4–3	East Makushita #5; 2–5	East Makushita #16; 5–2	East Makushita #11; 2–5	West Makushita #25; 3–4	East Makushita #35; 7–0; Champion
2002	West Makushita #2; 2–5	West Makushita #11; 3–4	East Makushita #14; 2–5	West Makushita #26; 6–1–P	East Makushita #10; 2–1–4	West Makushita #20; 3–4
2003	East Makushita #28; 5–2	East Makushita #15; 5–2	West Makushita #8; 3–4	West Makushita #13; 4–3	West Makushita #9; 3–4	West Makushita #16; 7–0; Champion
2004	West Jūryō #10; 6–9	East Jūryō #13; 5–10	West Makushita #3; 2–5	East Makushita #12; 4–3	East Makushita #9; 6–1	West Makushita #2; 4–3
2005	West Jūryō #14; 8–7	East Jūryō #12; 6–9	East Jūryō #13; 8–7	West Jūryō #7; 8–7	West Jūryō #5; 6–9	West Jūryō #8; 9–6
2006	East Jūryō #4; 8–7	West Jūryō #2; 8–7	West Jūryō #1; 8–7	West Maegashira #16; 2–13	West Jūryō #9; 8–7	West Jūryō #8; 4–11
2007	West Jūryō #14; 8–7	East Jūryō #12; 8–7	West Jūryō #9; 8–7	East Jūryō #6; 6–9	West Jūryō #8; 0–4–11	West Makushita #8; 2–5
2008	West Makushita #19; 3–4	West Makushita #26; 4–3	East Makushita #19; 3–4	West Makushita #26; 6–1–PP	West Makushita #9; 3–4	East Makushita #13; 2–5
2009	East Makushita #31; 4–3	East Makushita #24; 3–4	East Makushita #33; 4–3	East Makushita #27; 3–4	West Makushita #34; 3–4	West Makushita #44; 3–4
2010	West Makushita #54; Retired; 4–3	x	x	x	x	x
Record given as wins–losses–absences Top division champion Top division runner-up Retired Lower divisions Non-participation Sanshō key: F=Fighting spirit; O=Outstanding performance; T=Technique Also shown: ★=Kinboshi; P=Playoff(s); Divisions: Makuuchi — Jūryō — Makushita — Sandanme — Jonidan — Jonokuchi Makuuchi ranks: Yokozuna — Ōzeki — Sekiwake — Komusubi — Maegashira

== See also ==
- Glossary of sumo terms
- List of past sumo wrestlers
