= Kuniyuki =

- Gender: Male

Origin
- Origin: Japanese
- Meaning: Different meanings depending on the kanji used

Kuniyuki (written: 國行 or 圀順) is a masculine Japanese given name. Notable people with the name include:

- Kurosegawa Kuniyuki (黒瀬川 國行; born 1951), Japanese sumo wrestler
- Kuniyuki Takahashi, Japanese DJ and music producer
- Kuniyuki Tokugawa (徳川 圀順; 1886–1969)
