= Hisateru =

- Gender: Male

Origin
- Origin: Japanese
- Meaning: Different meanings depending on the kanji used

Hisateru (written 久晃 or 久照) is a masculine Japanese given name. Notable people with the name include:

- Daiju Hisateru (大受 久晃; born 1950), Japanese sumo wrestler
- Hisateru Hirashima (平島 久照; born 1983), Japanese rugby union player
