= Kōbōyama Daizō =

Japanese sumo wrestler

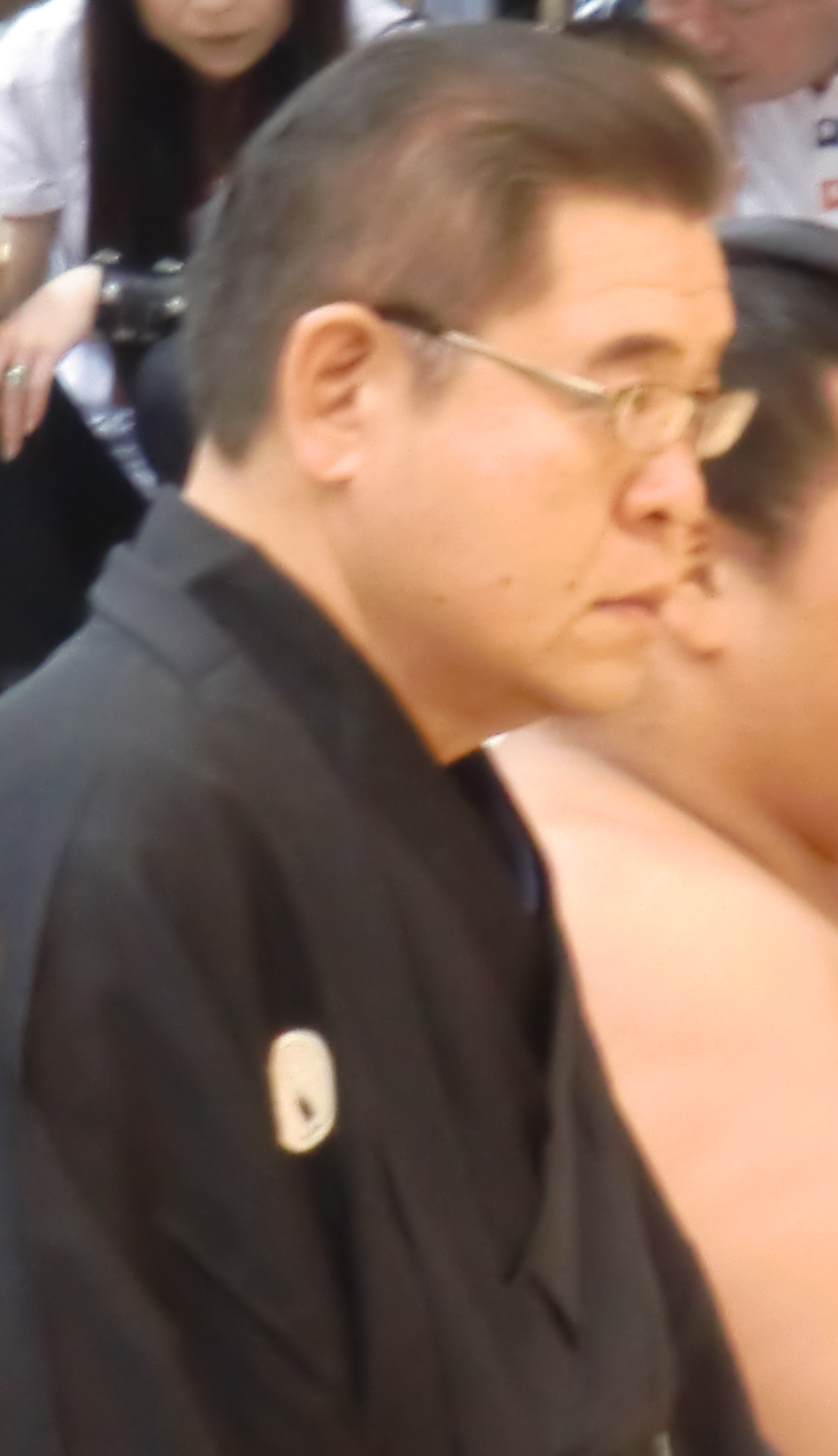

Personal information
- Native name: 髙望山大造
- Born: 蓬田光吉 Kōkichi Yomogida; 15 August 1957 (age 69) Tsukidate, Miyagi, Japan
- Height: 1.79 m (5 ft 10 1/2 in)
- Weight: 135 kg (298 lb; 21.3 st)

Sport
- Sport: Sumo
- Retired: November, 1990
- Heya: Takashima → Kumagatani stable
- Record: 579-606-21
- Debut: March, 1973
- Highest rank: Sekiwake (January, 1984)
- Elder name: Takashima
- Special Prizes: Technique (2)
- Updated on July 2012

Kōbōyama Daizō (born 15 August 1957 as Kōkichi Yomogida) is a former sumo wrestler from Tsukidate, Kurihara, Miyagi Prefecture, Japan. He made his professional debut in 1973 and reached the top makuuchi division in 1981. His highest rank was sekiwake. He earned two special prizes for Technique and was a runner-up in one tournament. He retired in 1990. He is now a sumo coach and ran the Takashima stable from 1993 until 2011. He was elected to the Japan Sumo Association's board of directors in 2018.

== Career ==
He came from a family of beef cattle farmers. He was a Prefectural Junior School Sumo Champion.

He joined Takashima stable at the age of 15 in March 1973, recruited by former ōzeki Mitsuneyama. There were a large number of new recruits in that tournament because of a rule change. Also among them was the future top division wrestler Chikubayama. He made the juryo division in May 1981 at the age of 23. He reached the top makuuchi division for the first time in November 1981, although he was demoted back to juryo after three tournaments. In May 1982 he took part in a playoff for the juryo division championship or yusho and although he was defeated (he would never win a championship in any division) he was promoted back to the top division. He was transferred to Kumagatani stable in the same year upon the retirement of his stablemaster. He was runner-up to Chiyonofuji in July 1982, earning his first special prize for Technique. In November 1983 he won his second Technique prize and was promoted all the way from maegashira 7 to sekiwake, because of the failure of the men above him in the rankings to obtain winning records. This was to be his highest rank. He won only two bouts in this tournament and made the sanyaku ranks only one more time, at komusubi in September 1985. He struggled against the top ranked wrestlers, failing to defeat a yokozuna in 17 attempts, and beating an ozeki only twice in 35 attempts (Asashio and Hokutenyu once each). Nevertheless he was ranked in the top division for 42 straight tournaments from re-entering makuuchi in March 1983, before being finally demoted to the juryo division after the January 1990 tournament.

Koboyama served regularly as the tsuyuharai to Chiyonofuji for the yokozuna's dohyo-iri ceremony, even though the two were not members of the same stable or ichimon.

== Retirement from sumo ==
Kōbōyama continued to fight in the jūryō division until November 1990, when he announced his retirement after demotion to the unsalaried makushita division was certain. His top division record was 312 wins to 344 losses with 16 absences, a winning percentage of .453. He became an elder of the Japan Sumo Association, and re-established the Takashima stable in 1993. The stable closed in June 2011 when its only remaining wrestler retired, and Takashima moved to Kasugayama stable to work as a coach there. After the closure of Kasugayama stable in October 2016 he moved briefly to Oitekaze stable before transferring to Miyagino stable. He had remained close to Miyagino stable's head coach Chikubayama, who he had made his debut alongside, and he had introduced the Mongolian wrestler Ryuo to Miyagino stable after Ryuo was unable to join Takashima stable due to there already being a foreigner present (Fudoyama).

Takashima ran for a seat on the Sumo Association's board of directors in January 2016, but was unsuccessful. However, he was elected on the next occasion in January 2018. After serving for four years with two terms, he did not run for reelection in 2022, and reached the standard retirement age of 65 for oyakata in August of that year. He was re-hired as a consultant for a further five years, and in the same month he transferred to Isenoumi stable.

== Fighting style ==
He liked pushing and thrusting techniques. Unusually, instead of favouring a right or left hand grip he specialised in moro-zashi, or using two hands inside his opponent's arms to grab the mawashi, and was fond of the rare kimarite or technique of tottari, the arm bar throw.

== Career record ==
Kōbōyama Daizō
Year	January Hatsu basho, Tokyo	March Haru basho, Osaka	May Natsu basho, Tokyo	July Nagoya basho, Nagoya	September Aki basho, Tokyo	November Kyūshū basho, Fukuoka
1973	x	(Maezumo)	East Jonokuchi #6; 4–3	West Jonidan #59; 2–5	West Jonidan #84; 5–2	East Jonidan #48; 4–2
1974	West Jonidan #36; 2–5	West Jonidan #61; 4–3	West Jonidan #47; 2–5	West Jonidan #69; 5–2	East Jonidan #33; 4–3	West Jonidan #18; 4–3
1975	West Jonidan #1; 3–4	East Jonidan #12; 3–4	West Jonidan #25; 4–3	West Jonidan #7; 3–4	East Jonidan #24; 6–1	East Sandanme #48; 4–3
1976	East Sandanme #32; 4–3	East Sandanme #19; 4–3	East Sandanme #8; 3–4	East Sandanme #19; 4–3	East Sandanme #8; 3–4	East Sandanme #17; 4–3
1977	East Sandanme #3; 4–3	West Makushita #52; 4–3	East Makushita #41; 2–5	West Sandanme #2; 5–2	East Makushita #44; 4–3	East Makushita #37; 3–4
1978	East Makushita #48; 4–3	West Makushita #35; 5–2	West Makushita #22; 4–3	East Makushita #15; 4–3	East Makushita #12; 2–5	West Makushita #32; 3–4
1979	East Makushita #43; 5–2	West Makushita #26; 4–3	East Makushita #20; 3–4	East Makushita #29; 4–3	East Makushita #21; 4–3	East Makushita #16; 3–4
1980	West Makushita #23; 3–4	East Makushita #33; 3–4	East Makushita #42; 3–4	East Makushita #49; 5–2	West Makushita #29; 6–1	West Makushita #10; 3–4
1981	East Makushita #17; 6–1	West Makushita #4; 5–2	East Jūryō #13; 11–4	East Jūryō #5; 9–6	East Jūryō #1; 8–7	West Maegashira #12; 8–7
1982	West Maegashira #9; 6–9	West Maegashira #11; 5–10	West Jūryō #1; 11–4–P	East Maegashira #11; 11–4; T	West Maegashira #3; 0–3–12	East Jūryō #2; 7–8
1983	East Jūryō #3; 10–5	West Maegashira #12; 9–6	East Maegashira #3; 6–9	West Maegashira #7; 9–6	East Maegashira #2; 5–10	West Maegashira #7; 10–5; T
1984	West Sekiwake #1; 2–13	West Maegashira #7; 8–7	West Maegashira #2; 2–9–4	East Maegashira #14; 9–6	West Maegashira #7; 6–9	West Maegashira #10; 9–6
1985	East Maegashira #4; 5–10	West Maegashira #10; 8–7	East Maegashira #6; 7–8	West Maegashira #7; 9–6	West Komusubi #1; 4–11	East Maegashira #7; 6–9
1986	West Maegashira #12; 9–6	East Maegashira #8; 7–8	East Maegashira #11; 8–7	East Maegashira #7; 7–8	East Maegashira #9; 6–9	East Maegashira #13; 8–7
1987	West Maegashira #9; 8–7	East Maegashira #6; 8–7	West Maegashira #1; 3–12	West Maegashira #7; 6–9	West Maegashira #12; 9–6	East Maegashira #4; 6–9
1988	West Maegashira #5; 8–7	East Maegashira #2; 4–11	East Maegashira #11; 8–7	East Maegashira #7; 6–9	West Maegashira #11; 8–7	West Maegashira #8; 5–10
1989	West Maegashira #13; 8–7	East Maegashira #9; 8–7	West Maegashira #3; 3–12	West Maegashira #12; 8–7	East Maegashira #10; 7–8	West Maegashira #12; 7–8
1990	East Maegashira #14; 3–12	East Jūryō #8; 8–7	West Jūryō #3; 6–9	West Jūryō #6; 7–8	East Jūryō #8; 6–9	West Jūryō #11; Retired; 2–8
Record given as wins–losses–absences Top division champion Top division runner-up Retired Lower divisions Non-participation Sanshō key: F=Fighting spirit; O=Outstanding performance; T=Technique Also shown: ★=Kinboshi; P=Playoff(s); Divisions: Makuuchi — Jūryō — Makushita — Sandanme — Jonidan — Jonokuchi Makuuchi ranks: Yokozuna — Ōzeki — Sekiwake — Komusubi — Maegashira

== See also ==
- List of sumo tournament top division runners-up
- List of past sumo wrestlers
- List of sumo elders
- List of sekiwake
