= Daiju =

Daiju is both a masculine Japanese given name and a Japanese surname. Notable people with the name include:

- Daiju Matsumoto (松本 大樹, born 1977), Japanese footballer
- Daiju Sasaki (佐々木 大樹, born 1999), Japanese footballer
- Daiju Takase (高瀬 大樹, born 1978), Japanese mixed martial arts fighter and kickboxer
- Daiju Hisateru, Japanese sumo wrestler
