= Itai Keisuke =

Japanese sumo wrestler (1956–2018)

Personal information
- Native name: 板井圭介
- Born: Keisuke Itai; 21 March 1956 Ōita, Japan
- Died: 14 August 2018 (aged 62)
- Height: 1.76 m (5 ft 9 1/2 in)
- Weight: 135 kg (298 lb)

Sport
- Sport: Sumo
- Retired: September, 1991
- Heya: Onaruto
- Record: 493-515-98
- Debut: September, 1978
- Highest rank: Komusubi (May, 1989)
- Championships: 2 (Jūryō); 1 (Makushita); 1 (Sandanme); 1 (Jonidan); 1 (Jonokuchi)
- Special Prizes: Outstanding Performance (1); Technique (1)
- Gold Stars: 3 (Ōnokuni)

Itai Keisuke (板井圭介, Itai Keisuke; 21 March 1956 – 14 August 2018) was a Japanese sumo wrestler from Usuki, Oita, Japan. His highest rank was komusubi. He held the record for most consecutive victories from entry into sumo for several years before it was broken by Jōkōryū in 2012. After his retirement, Itai caused controversy by claiming that the outcomes of many of his matches were set by match-fixing.

== Career ==
He played baseball at elementary school but was converted to sumo at Oita Prefectural Ocean Science High School where his older brother was active in the school's sumo team. Despite being scouted by ex-Yoshibayama of the Miyagino stable and solicitations from the Nihon University and Komazawa University sumo teams, he did not think he could make the grade as a pro. Instead, after graduating from high school he worked in the ceramics industry until he was 22. He was active in his company's sumo division and won many national youth competitions as an amateur. He did not turn professional until September 1978 when he joined Onaruto stable, set up by the former sekiwake Kōtetsuyama Toyoya after he left Asahiyama stable. Itai rose up the rankings in record time, winning his first 26 matches, a record at that time for most consecutive victories from entry into sumo. He reached the second jūryō division just six tournaments after his professional debut, and was given the shikona of Kōtetsuyama, after his stablemaster. He was promoted to the top makuuchi division after winning the jūryō championship in July 1980. However he dropped out of his debut makuuchi tournament on the fifth day without even winning one match. He won promotion to the top division once again after winning another jūryō title in March 1981 but once again dropped out of the following tournament, this time after only three days. Struggling with a left knee injury, he fell all the way down to the unsalaried makushita division. In an effort to change his fortunes, he dropped the shikona and reverted to his real surname, which he was to use for the rest of his career.

Itai finally managed to win a top division bout on his third attempt in November 1982, and came through with his first kachi-koshi or winning score in March 1983. He remained in the top division for 50 consecutive tournaments. Although he was short for a sumo wrestler at just 1.76 m (5 ft 9 1/2 in), he was a powerful pusher-thruster, specialising in oshi techniques. He earned three gold stars for defeating yokozuna, all of which were bouts against Onokuni. He defeated Onokuni six times in a row from November 1985 until March 1988 (including when Onokuni was at ōzeki rank) and used fierce harite or slaps to the face (reinforced by strapping around his hands) which knocked Onokuni straight to the ground in one match. However by contrast he lost all 16 bouts against yokozuna Chiyonofuji. His best result in a tournament was 11-4 in March 1989, for which he was awarded two special prizes for outstanding performance and technique. At 33 he was the oldest first-time special prize winner since Shionishiki in May 1959. He earned promotion to komusubi for the following tournament, but only managed three wins in his sanyaku debut and never managed to return to the rank. In the July 1991 tournament, ranked at the bottom of the makuuchi division, he lost every one of his fifteen bouts and was demoted to jūryō. He announced his retirement from sumo three days into the following tournament at the age of 35. Unusually, his professional debut, jūryō debut, makuuchi debut and retirement all took place in the Aki basho held in September.

== Retirement from sumo ==
Itai was unable to purchase or borrow toshiyori kabu, or elder stock upon his retirement and so was unable to remain in the Japan Sumo Association. As a result, his Onaruto stable folded in 1994 when no successor to his old stablemaster could be found. Itai began a new career as a chankonabe restaurant owner.

In February 2000, in a lecture to the Foreign Correspondents' Club of Japan and a string of articles published in the tabloid Shukan Gendai magazine, he claimed that during his active career yaocho, or match-fixing was widespread, with up to 80 percent of bouts being prearranged. Wrestlers who had already secured their kachi-koshi would lose deliberately to those still needing wins, in exchange for points to be collected at later tournaments. Wrestlers who had not accumulated points would have to "buy" victories instead for around $2,000. He said the fixed matches would be arranged through the wrestlers' tsukebito or personal attendants, often in the dressing room shortly before the bout, and "was kind of an ordinary thing." Itai claimed the practice was still continuing today, although to a lesser extent. He said he could tell if a match was fixed just by watching it on TV, and accused ōzeki Chiyotaikai and yokozuna Akebono among others of throwing bouts. The Sumo Association strenuously denied the allegations, with its chairman Tokitsukaze Oyakata threatening Itai with legal action unless he withdraw his claims. Itai, who had joined a religious group called the God Light Association in the 1980s, said he was on a "mission from God" to reveal the truth behind match-fixing. Others pointed out his restaurant business was struggling and he was well paid for his interviews. Itai claimed to have evidence on tape, but it was never produced publicly and the Sumo Association did not in the end go to the courts.

In October 2008 in the Tokyo District Court, Itai appeared for the defence in a lawsuit brought by Kitanoumi, the head of the Sumo Association, against the Shukan Gendai magazine over further match-fixing allegations in its March 10, 2007 issue. He repeated his belief that 75–80 percent of matches were fixed during his active days, and he stated that only three yokozuna, Onokuni, Takanohana and Wakanohana had not thrown bouts in recent times. He claimed that he arranged a fixed match with Kitanoumi in the July 1984 tournament, through an intermediary, for 500,000 yen. He also said he was now working in a glass factory and had no other source of income.

== Death ==
In his later years Itai suffered from diabetes and had a pacemaker fitted. He died on 14 August 2018 after collapsing at his home. He was 62.

== Career record ==
Itai Keisuke
Year	January Hatsu basho, Tokyo	March Haru basho, Osaka	May Natsu basho, Tokyo	July Nagoya basho, Nagoya	September Aki basho, Tokyo	November Kyūshū basho, Fukuoka
1978	x	x	x	x	(Maezumō)	East Jonokuchi #17; 7–0; Champion
1979	West Jonidan #24; 7–0; Champion	East Sandanme #34; 7–0; Champion	East Makushita #29; 6–1	East Makushita #4; 5–2	West Jūryō #12; 9–6	West Jūryō #8; 9–6
1980	East Jūryō #3; 8–7	West Jūryō #2; 6–9	West Jūryō #8; 9–6	East Jūryō #5; 13–2; Champion	East Maegashira #12; 0–5–10	East Jūryō #10; Sat out due to injury 0–0–15
1981	East Jūryō #10; 10–5	East Jūryō #2; 12–3; Champion	West Maegashira #11; 0–3–12	East Jūryō #10; Sat out due to injury 0–0–15	East Jūryō #10; 1–2–12	East Makushita #15; 0–4–3
1982	East Makushita #45; 7–0; Champion	West Makushita #3; 6–1–P	East Jūryō #13; 10–5	East Jūryō #3; 8–7	West Jūryō #2; 10–5	East Maegashira #13; 4–11
1983	East Jūryō #6; 11–4–P	East Maegashira #13; 8–7	East Maegashira #5; 6–9	West Maegashira #8; 8–7	East Maegashira #6; 8–7	West Maegashira #1; 5–10
1984	West Maegashira #7; 8–7	East Maegashira #2; 2–13	East Maegashira #13; 9–6	West Maegashira #7; 9–6	West Maegashira #2; 6–9	East Maegashira #8; 8–7
1985	West Maegashira #4; 6–9	East Maegashira #8; 9–6	East Maegashira #3; 5–10	East Maegashira #7; 7–8	East Maegashira #9; 8–7	West Maegashira #2; 3–8–4
1986	West Maegashira #13; Sat out due to injury 0–0–15	West Maegashira #13; 9–6	West Maegashira #6; 9–6	East Maegashira #1; 2–13	East Maegashira #12; 10–5	East Maegashira #3; 5–10
1987	West Maegashira #10; 9–6	East Maegashira #3; 4–11	West Maegashira #10; 8–7	West Maegashira #4; 6–9	East Maegashira #10; 9–6	East Maegashira #2; 4–11 ★
1988	East Maegashira #10; 8–7	East Maegashira #4; 6–9 ★	West Maegashira #7; 8–7	West Maegashira #2; 3–12	East Maegashira #11; 9–6	West Maegashira #4; 3–12
1989	West Maegashira #10; 8–7	East Maegashira #7; 11–4; OT★	West Komusubi #1; 3–12	East Maegashira #8; 8–7	East Maegashira #5; 6–9	East Maegashira #9; 8–7
1990	East Maegashira #3; 4–11	West Maegashira #12; 9–6	East Maegashira #5; 8–7	West Maegashira #1; 4–11	East Maegashira #9; 8–7	West Maegashira #3; 3–12
1991	West Maegashira #12; 8–7	East Maegashira #9; 8–7	West Maegashira #4; 4–11	East Maegashira #14; 0–15	East Jūryō #9; Retired; 1–2–1	x
Record given as wins–losses–absences Top division champion Top division runner-up Retired Non-participation Jūryō Lower divisions Sanshō key: F=Fighting spirit; O=Outstanding performance; T=Technique Also shown: ★=Kinboshi; P=Playoff(s); Divisions: Makuuchi — Jūryō — Makushita — Sandanme — Jonidan — Jonokuchi Makuuchi ranks: Yokozuna — Ōzeki — Sekiwake — Komusubi — Maegashira

== See also ==
- List of sumo record holders
- Match-fixing in professional sumo
- List of sumo tournament second division champions
- Glossary of sumo terms
- List of past sumo wrestlers
- List of komusubi
