= Mitsuneyama Keiji =

Japanese sumo wrestler

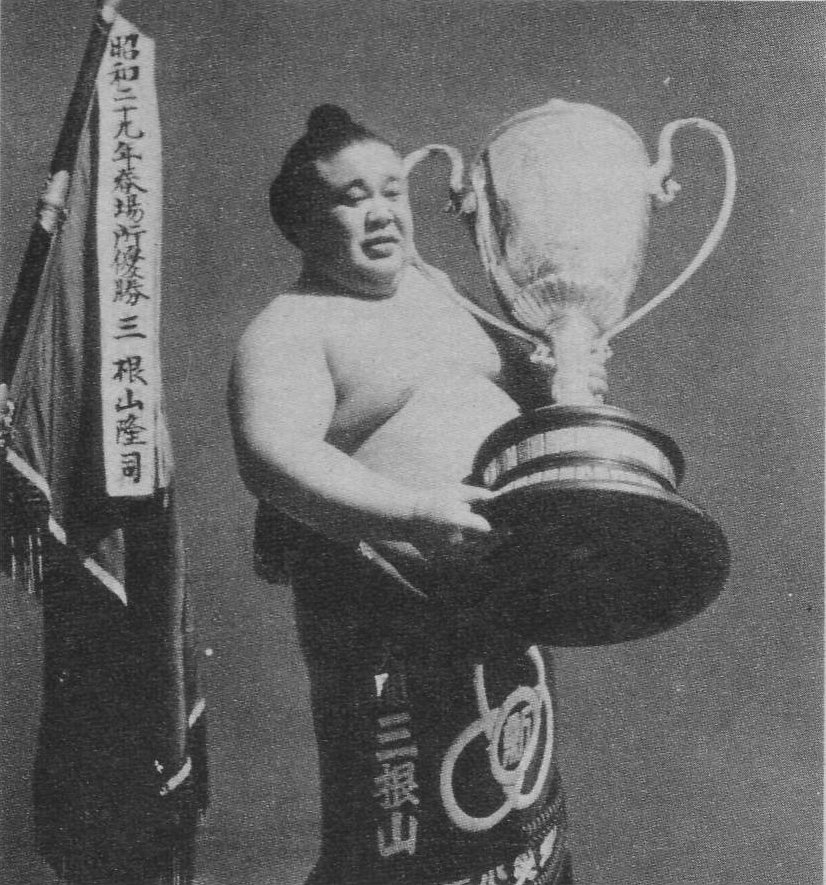
- With the Emperor's Cup in 1954

Personal information
- Native name: 三根山 宝國
- Born: Tōichi Shimamura; 7 February 1922 Tokyo, Japan
- Died: 15 August 1989 (aged 67)
- Height: 1.76 m (5 ft 9 1/2 in)
- Weight: 150 kg (330 lb)

Sport
- Sport: Sumo
- Retired: January 1960
- Heya: Takashima
- Record: 479-389-35
- Debut: May 1937
- Highest rank: Ōzeki (September 1953)
- Elder name: Takashima
- Championships: 1 (Makuuchi); 1 (Jūryō); 1 (Sandanme)
- Special Prizes: Outstanding Performance (5); Fighting Spirit (2)
- Gold Stars: 9 Terukuni (3); Kagamisato (2); Akinoumi; Maedayama; Azumafuji; Chiyonoyama
- Updated on June 2020

Mitsuneyama Keiji, real name Tōichi Shimamura (7 February 1922 – 15 August 1989) was a sumo wrestler from Arakawa, Tokyo, Japan who won the top division yūshō or tournament championship in 1954. His highest rank was ōzeki and he earned nine kinboshi or gold stars for defeating yokozuna when ranked as a maegashira, and seven special prizes. After his retirement in 1960 he was the head coach of Takashima stable.

== Career ==
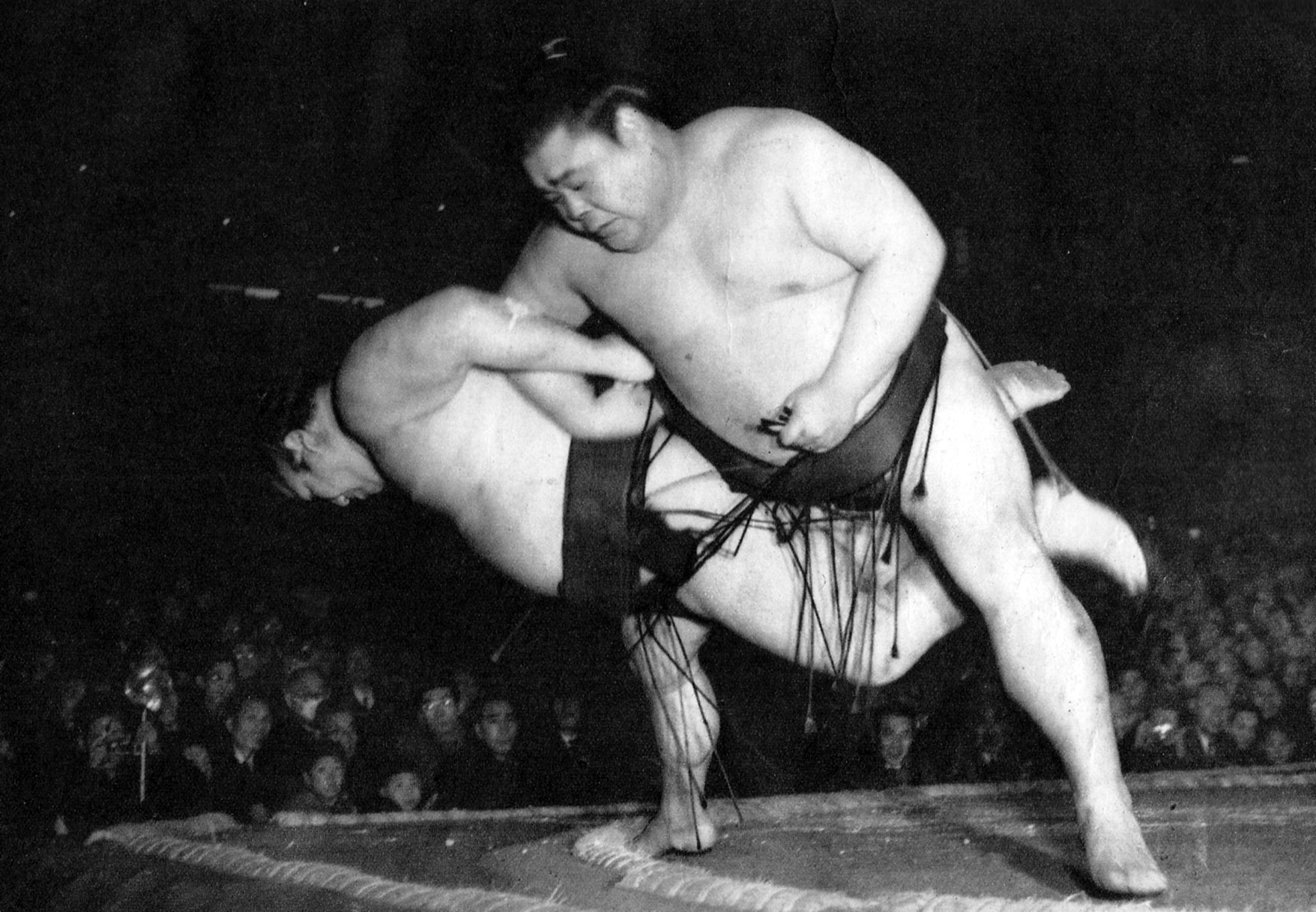
Mitsuneyama in a bout against Nayoroiwa in 1953

He began his professional career in 1937, joining Takashima stable, reaching the top makuuchi division in 1944. He earned nine kinboshi or gold stars for defeating yokozuna whilst ranked as a maegashira, and seven sanshō or special prizes. In 1953, at the age of 31, he was promoted to the second highest rank of ōzeki, after 16 tournaments in the lower san'yaku ranks, ten at sekiwake and six at komusubi. Three tournaments later he took his only top division yūshō or tournament championship, with a 12–3 record. At 32 years and one month he is the sixth oldest first time yūshō winner since World War II, behind Kyokutenhō, Tamawashi, Tamanoumi, Yoshibayama and Takatōriki. He lost the ōzeki rank in 1955, largely due to injuries. He carried on fighting in the maegashira ranks, last under the shikona Mitsuneyama Hōkoku, until January 1960 when he retired at the age of nearly 38.

== Retirement from sumo ==
He remained in the sumo world as a toshiyori or elder of the Japan Sumo Association under the name Kumagatani Oyakata and founded his own Kumagatani stable. In May 1961 he acquired the Takashima elder name and changed the name of the stable to Takashima stable. He produced the top division wrestlers Daiju and Kōbōyama, but resigned due to ill health in 1982, the heya being absorbed into another incarnation of Kumagatani stable founded by the former Yoshinomine. He continued to work as a coach at Kumagatani before leaving the Sumo Association in January 1985. He died in 1989.

== Pre-modern top division record ==
- Through most of the 1940s only two tournaments were held a year and only one tournament was held in 1946. The New Year tournament began and the Spring tournament returned to Osaka tournament in 1953.

Mitsuneyama Keiji
-	Spring Haru basho, Tokyo	Summer Natsu basho, Tokyo	Autumn Aki basho, Tokyo
1944	West Maegashira #12; 11–4	East Maegashira #4; 7–3 ★★	East Maegashira #1; 6–4 ★
1945	Not held	West Komusubi #1; 1–6	West Maegashira #6; 3–7
1946	Not held	Not held	West Maegashira #10; 11–2
1947	Not held	East Komusubi #2; 4–5–1	East Maegashira #2; 8–3 ★
1948	Not held	West Komusubi #1; 7–4	East Sekiwake #1; 4–7
1949	East Maegashira #2; 9–4; O★	West Komusubi #1; 6–8–1	West Maegashira #1; 8–7
1950	West Sekiwake #1; 3–6–6	East Maegashira #2; 8–7 ★	East Komusubi #1; 11–4
1951	East Sekiwake #2; 13–2; O	East Sekiwake #1; 7–8	East Sekiwake #2; 11–4; O
1952	East Sekiwake #1; 8–7	West Sekiwake #1; 11–4; O	East Sekiwake #1; 6–9
Record given as wins–losses–absences Top division champion Top division runner-up Retired Lower divisions Non-participation Sanshō key: F=Fighting spirit; O=Outstanding performance; T=Technique Also shown: ★=Kinboshi; P=Playoff(s); Divisions: Makuuchi — Jūryō — Makushita — Sandanme — Jonidan — Jonokuchi Makuuchi ranks: Yokozuna — Ōzeki — Sekiwake — Komusubi — Maegashira

-	New Year Hatsu basho, Tokyo	Spring Haru basho, Osaka	Summer Natsu basho, Tokyo	Autumn Aki basho, Tokyo
1953	East Komusubi #2; 10–5	East Sekiwake #2; 11–4; F	East Sekiwake #1; 12–3; O	East Ōzeki #2; 8–7
1954	East Ōzeki #2; 10–5	East Ōzeki #1; 12–3	East Ōzeki #1; 10–5	West Ōzeki #1; 5–10
1955	East Ōzeki #1; 9–6	East Ōzeki #1; 3–7–5	West Ōzeki #1; 6–9	East Sekiwake #2; Sat out due to injury 0–0–15
1956	East Maegashira #2; 4–11	West Maegashira #6; 5–10	East Maegashira #13; 9–6	West Maegashira #10; 10–5; F
Record given as wins–losses–absences Top division champion Top division runner-up Retired Lower divisions Non-participation Sanshō key: F=Fighting spirit; O=Outstanding performance; T=Technique Also shown: ★=Kinboshi; P=Playoff(s); Divisions: Makuuchi — Jūryō — Makushita — Sandanme — Jonidan — Jonokuchi Makuuchi ranks: Yokozuna — Ōzeki — Sekiwake — Komusubi — Maegashira

== Modern tournament record ==
- Since the addition of the Kyushu tournament in 1957 and the Nagoya tournament in 1958, the yearly schedule has remained unchanged.

Year	January Hatsu basho, Tokyo	March Haru basho, Osaka	May Natsu basho, Tokyo	July Nagoya basho, Nagoya	September Aki basho, Tokyo	November Kyūshū basho, Fukuoka
1957	East Maegashira #2; 7–8 ★	East Maegashira #3; 5–10	East Maegashira #6; 9–6 ★	Not held	East Maegashira #2; 6–9 ★	West Maegashira #3; 5–10
1958	East Maegashira #8; 5–10	East Maegashira #14; 10–5	West Maegashira #7; 10–5	East Maegashira #2; 7–8	West Maegashira #3; 6–9	East Maegashira #5; 7–8
1959	East Maegashira #6; 6–9	East Maegashira #8; 7–8	West Maegashira #9; 7–8	West Maegashira #10; 8–7	East Maegashira #9; 9–6	East Maegashira #3; 2–13
1960	East Maegashira #13; Retired; 4–4–7	x	x	x	x	x
Record given as wins–losses–absences Top division champion Top division runner-up Retired Lower divisions Non-participation Sanshō key: F=Fighting spirit; O=Outstanding performance; T=Technique Also shown: ★=Kinboshi; P=Playoff(s); Divisions: Makuuchi — Jūryō — Makushita — Sandanme — Jonidan — Jonokuchi Makuuchi ranks: Yokozuna — Ōzeki — Sekiwake — Komusubi — Maegashira

== See also ==
- List of sumo record holders
- List of sumo tournament top division champions
- List of sumo tournament second division champions
- List of past sumo wrestlers
- List of ōzeki
