= Kiriyama stable =

Defunct sumo stable

Kiriyama stable (桐山部屋, Kiriyama-beya) stable (1995–2011) of the Tatsunami group.

It was set up in January 1995 by the former komusubi Kurosegawa, who branched out from the now defunct Isegahama stable and took with him the remaining members of the Onaruto stable which closed at the end of 1994. In 2000 it absorbed Kise stable, and in 2007 its parent Isegahama stable. As of 2009, it had seven wrestlers. In that year the stable also produced its first sekitori, the Mongolian Tokusegawa. It was also the home of the tate-yobidashi, the highest ranking usher.

The stable closed after the January 2011 tournament. On January 27, 2011, the Japan Sumo Association approved the transfer of Kiriyama stable to Asahiyama stable. Eleven people moved to Asahiyama, while Kokichi moved to Tomozuna stable, and gyoji Kiichiro Shikimori and tokoyama Tokosaku moved to Oitekaze stable.

== Owner ==
- 1995–2011: 20th Kiriyama (komusubi Kurosegawa)

== Notable wrestlers ==
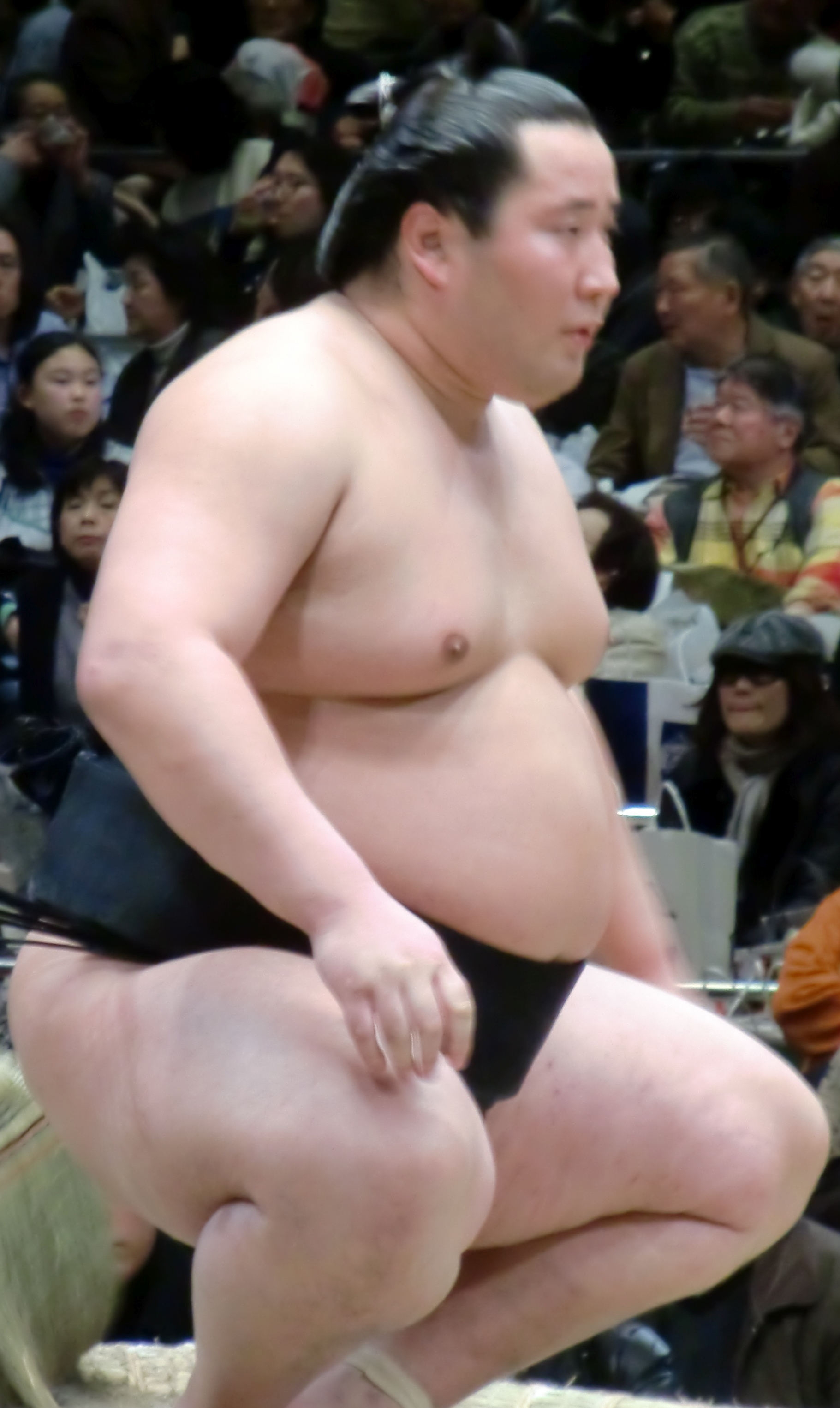
Tokusegawa was Kiriyama stable's first sekitori

- Tokusegawa (maegashira)

== Coach ==
- Urakaze (maegashira Teruzakura)

== Referee ==
- Kiichiro Shikimori (jūryō referee)

== Ushers ==
- Hideo (chief usher)
- Koji (makuuchi usher)

== See also ==
- List of sumo stables
- List of sumo elders
- List of active sumo wrestlers
- List of past sumo wrestlers
- List of years in sumo
- Glossary of sumo terms
