= Takashima stable (1960-1982) =

Defunct sumo stable

Takashima stable (高島部屋, Takashima-beya) (1960–1982) was a sumo stable of the Tatsunami group.

From January 1960 to May 1961 the stable was known as Kumagatani stable. Its head coach was former ōzeki Mitsuneyama. It closed in 1982 with all wrestlers and personnel transferring to the new Kumagatani stable.

== History ==
A previous incarnation of the stable existed from at least 1922, run by former maegashira Hakkozan and continued after his death in 1951 by former komusubi Tomoegata. This version had yokozuna Yoshibayama and Ozeki Mitsuneyama as members. Upon Mitsuneyama's retirement in January 1960 he branched out and founded a stable of his own, then known as Kumagatani stable. In May 1961 he received the more prestigious Takashima toshiyori (Ex-Tomoegata having switched to the Tomozuna name) and changed the name of the stable to match. Thus the March 1961 and May 1961 banzuke both had stables called Takashima, but they were entirely separate entities, the old continuing as Tomozuna stable.

The new Takashima stable would produce its first sekitori in March 1966 following the promotion of Wakahikari to Juryo. But with just a 3–12 record in his Juryo debut the stable would be left without a sekitori again. This would remain the case until the promotion of Daiju to the Juryo division in September 1969. He would quickly rise up the ranks making it to the Makuuchi division in May 1970 and then making his Sanyaku debut at Sekiwake in March 1971. Then in September 1973 he would reach the rank of Ozeki. Daiju would remain the stable's only sekitori until his retirement in May 1977. The Stable would again be without a Sekitori until the promotion of Koboyama to the Juryo division in May 1981. The stable would enter a period of decline after this with the stablemaster's health deteriorating. It deteriorated to such an extent that by 1982 he resigned as head of Takashima stable causing it to merge with another incarnation of Kumagatani stable.

== Owner ==
- 1960–1982: 10th Takashima Toshimasa (ōzeki, Mitsuneyama)

== Notable wrestlers ==
- Daiju (Ozeki)
- Koboyama (Sekiwake)
- Wakahikari (Juryo)

== See also ==
- List of sumo stables
- List of sumo elders
- List of active sumo wrestlers
- List of past sumo wrestlers
- List of years in sumo
- Glossary of sumo terms
