= Tokusegawa Masanao =

Sumo wrestler

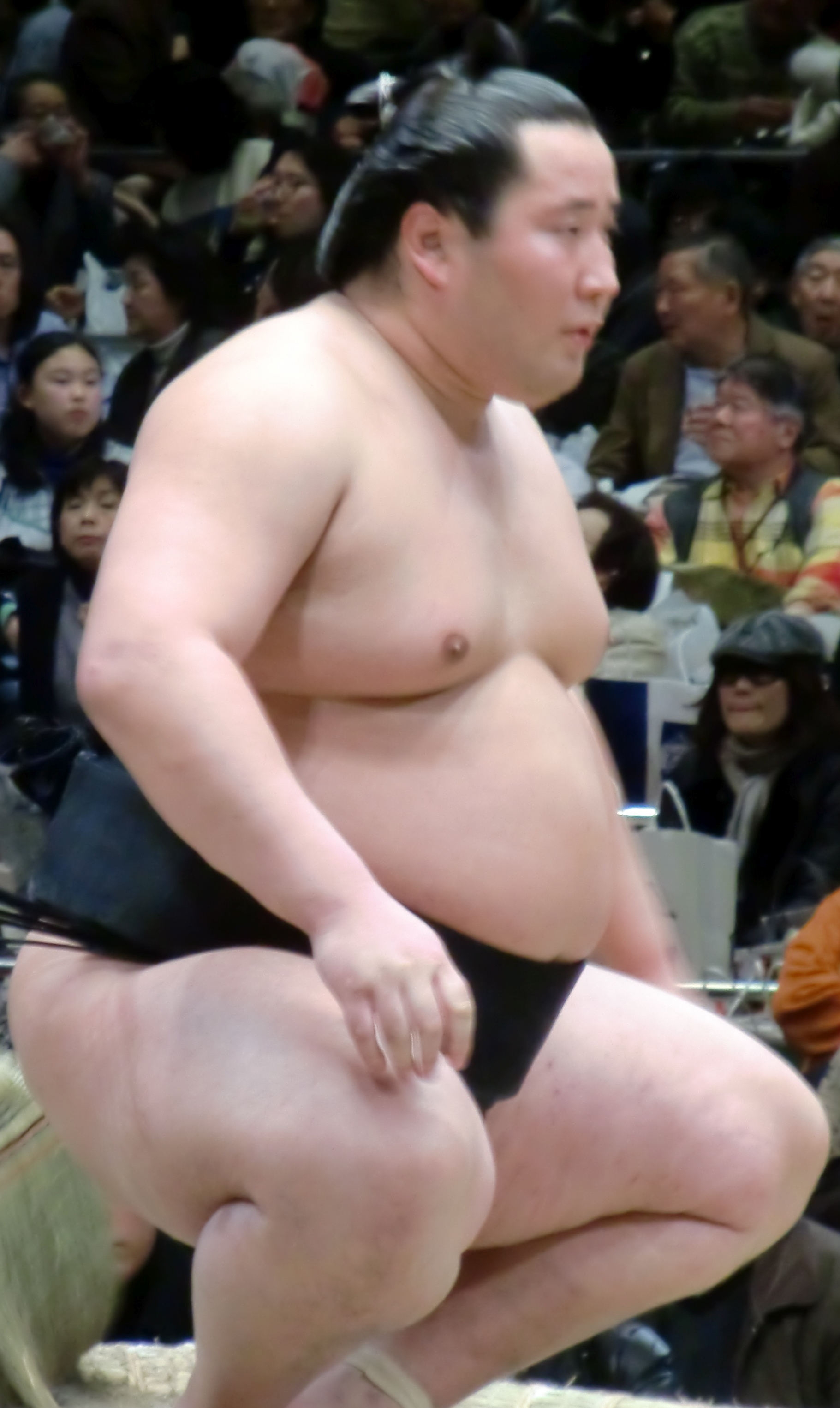

Personal information
- Native name: 德瀬川 正直
- Born: Badamsambuu Ganbold; August 6, 1983 (age 43) Ulan Bator, Mongolia
- Height: 1.90 m (6 ft 3 in)
- Weight: 154 kg (340 lb; 24.3 st)

Sport
- Sport: Sumo
- Retired: April 2011
- Heya: Asahiyama (formerly Kiriyama)
- Record: 223-163-9
- Debut: July 2003
- Highest rank: Maegashira 1 (May 2011)
- Championships: 1 (Makushita); 1 (Sandanme)
- Updated on Jan 2015

Tokusegawa Masano (德瀬川 正直, born August 6, 1983, as Badamsambuu Ganbold) is a former sumo wrestler from Ulan Bator, Mongolia. Joining the professional sport in 2003, he entered the top division for the first time in March 2010, and rose to the top of the maegashira ranks. He was forced to retire by the Japan Sumo Association in 2011 after being found guilty of match-fixing.

== Career ==
Tokusegawa's debut tournament in maezumo was considered a rather ignominious one, as he was cautioned by judges for cursing in Mongolian at a fellow Mongolian wrestler and slapping the wrestler's chest just after losing to him. He soon went on to distinguish himself though, steadily rising through the ranks. Except for a period in early 2005 where he suffered three consecutive losing tournaments while struggling in the sandanme division, he never had two consecutive losing tournaments. He took the sandanme championship in the November 2006 tournament with a 7–0 perfect record. His sumo became even more consistent and after a slow but steady rise to the upper ranks of the makushita division, he took the championship in the May 2009 tournament. As a result, he became the first wrestler from his stable to be promoted to the elite sekitori ranks. It took him only four tournaments to make his way through the second jūryō division, in which he suffered only one losing tournament. He came through with winning records in his first three top makuuchi division tournaments before recording his first make-koshi at maegashira 4 in September 2010. He responded with scores of 8–7 in November (which included a win over ozeki Kotooshu) and 9–6 in January 2011.

After the January 2011 tournament Tokusegawa's Kiriyama stable shut down and he moved with his stablemaster to the affiliated Asahiyama stable.

== Retirement from sumo ==
In April 2011 Tokusegawa was one of 23 wrestlers found guilty of match-fixing after an investigation by the Japan Sumo Association (JSA), and he was forced to retire from sumo. He responded, "I can't accept (this punishment). But what am I supposed to do if I oppose the JSA's decision?" He would have reached a new highest rank of maegashira 1 in the May 2011 tournament.

Following his retirement Tokusegawa returned to his native country and participated in Mongolian wrestling, winning the Western Region Danshig Naadam tournament in 2012.

== Fighting style ==
Tokusegawa was a yotsu-sumo specialist, preferring grappling techniques. His favoured grip on his opponent's mawashi was migi-yotsu (left hand outside, right hand inside) and his most common winning kimarite were yori-kiri and yori-taoshi (force out and down). He also regularly used uwatenage (overarm throw).

== Career record ==
Tokusegawa Masanao
Year	January Hatsu basho, Tokyo	March Haru basho, Osaka	May Natsu basho, Tokyo	July Nagoya basho, Nagoya	September Aki basho, Tokyo	November Kyūshū basho, Fukuoka
2003	x	x	x	(Maezumo)	East Jonokuchi #38; 6–1	West Jonidan #68; 6–1
2004	West Sandanme #96; 6–1	West Sandanme #36; 6–1	West Makushita #51; 3–4	West Sandanme #5; 5–2	West Makushita #44; 1–6	West Sandanme #11; 4–3
2005	West Makushita #59; 3–2–2	West Sandanme #12; 2–5	East Sandanme #37; 3–4	West Sandanme #51; 3–4	West Sandanme #71; 6–1	East Sandanme #15; 3–4
2006	East Sandanme #30; 4–3	West Sandanme #15; Sat out due to injury 0–0–7	East Sandanme #76; 4–3	West Sandanme #56; 4–3	East Sandanme #38; 5–2	East Sandanme #13; 7–0; Champion
2007	West Makushita #13; 4–3	West Makushita #11; 3–4	East Makushita #17; 4–3	West Makushita #12; 5–2	West Makushita #6; 3–4	East Makushita #11; 4–3
2008	West Makushita #7; 2–5	West Makushita #18; 5–2	East Makushita #10; 4–3	West Makushita #7; 4–3	East Makushita #5; 3–4	East Makushita #7; 5–2
2009	West Makushita #3; 3–4	West Makushita #6; 5–2	West Makushita #2; 7–0; Champion	West Jūryō #9; 8–7	East Jūryō #6; 6–9	West Jūryō #8; 10–5–P
2010	East Jūryō #1; 9–6	West Maegashira #13; 8–7	West Maegashira #11; 9–6	West Maegashira #7; 8–7	East Maegashira #4; 6–9	West Maegashira #6; 8–7
2011	West Maegashira #4; 9–6	Tournament Cancelled; 0–0–0	West Maegashira #1; Retired –	x	x	x
Record given as wins–losses–absences Top division champion Top division runner-up Retired Lower divisions Non-participation Sanshō key: F=Fighting spirit; O=Outstanding performance; T=Technique Also shown: ★=Kinboshi; P=Playoff(s); Divisions: Makuuchi — Jūryō — Makushita — Sandanme — Jonidan — Jonokuchi Makuuchi ranks: Yokozuna — Ōzeki — Sekiwake — Komusubi — Maegashira

== See also ==
- Glossary of sumo terms
- List of past sumo wrestlers
- List of Mongolian sumo wrestlers
- List of non-Japanese sumo wrestlers
