= Wakafutase Tadayuki =

Japanese sumo wrestler (1942–1997)

Personal information
- Native name: 若二瀬 唯之
- Born: Tadateru Tojima; February 20, 1942 Nagoya, Aichi, Japan
- Died: May 20, 1997 (aged 55)
- Height: 1.76 m (5 ft 9 1/2 in)
- Weight: 140 kg (310 lb; 22 st)

Sport
- Sport: Sumo
- Retired: March, 1975
- Heya: Onaruto → Asahiyama
- Record: 571-566-0
- Debut: September, 1960
- Highest rank: Komusubi (September, 1968)
- Elder name: Asahiyama
- Championships: 2 (Jūryō); 1 (Jonokuchi)
- Special Prizes: Outstanding Performance (1)
- Gold Stars: 1 (Kashiwado)
- Updated on June 2020

Wakafutase Tadayuki, born Tadateru Tojima (February 20, 1942 – May 20, 1997), was a sumo wrestler and coach from Nagoya, Aichi, Japan. His highest rank was komusubi. He was the head coach of Asahiyama stable from 1975 until his death in 1997.

== Career ==
He made his professional debut in September 1960, and reached the top division in March 1966. He won his only kinboshi in July 1968 when he defeated yokozuna Kashiwado on the opening day. This was also the only tournament in which he received a special prize, for Outstanding Performance. Following this performance he made his sanyaku debut at komusubi, a rank he was to hold three times in total. In January 1972 he was a tournament runner-up with a mere 10–5 record, as the yūshō was won by Tochiazuma with 11–4. (Wakafutase could have been involved in an eight-man playoff had ōzeki Kiyokuni defeated Tochiazuma on the final day.) Wakafutase did not miss a single bout in his career, making 1137 consecutive appearances.

== Retirement from sumo ==
Upon retirement from active competition in March 1975 he became an elder in the Japan Sumo Association. He took over as head coach of Asahiyama stable in October 1975 after the sudden death of the former Futaseyama, and was involved in a dispute with the previous head coach's widow, which led to six Tongan wrestlers at the stable running away and eventually being dismissed by the Sumo Association. This became an international incident with questions in the National Diet and the Sumo Association visiting the King of Tonga to explain, and Asahiyama was punished with a ten percent salary reduction for six months for his poor supervision of the situation. Among the wrestlers he coached were juryo Iwatefuji and Genkai, and maegashira Daihishō. He died suddenly of an acute myocardial infarction while still an active oyakata in May 1997. Daihishō, who by then was the stable's only sekitori, was injured in a bout against Tochinonada the day after Asahiyama's death and was out for two months, unable to attend his funeral. Due to Asahiyama's unexpected death there was no obvious successor available, and former ōzeki Daiju of the affiliated Tatsunami stable was asked to take over.

== Career record ==
Wakafutase Tadayuki
Year	January Hatsu basho, Tokyo	March Haru basho, Osaka	May Natsu basho, Tokyo	July Nagoya basho, Nagoya	September Aki basho, Tokyo	November Kyūshū basho, Fukuoka
1960	x	x	x	x	(Maezumo)	East Jonokuchi #21; 6–1–P; Champion
1961	West Jonidan #68; 4–3	West Jonidan #33; 6–1	West Sandanme #86; 4–3	East Sandanme #64; 3–4	East Sandanme #73; 5–2	West Sandanme #24; 5–2
1962	East Makushita #83; 4–3	West Makushita #73; 7–0–P	East Makushita #25; 3–4	East Makushita #29; 5–2	West Makushita #22; 2–5	West Makushita #33; 5–2
1963	East Makushita #24; 6–1	West Makushita #12; 4–3	West Makushita #8; 2–5	West Makushita #15; 5–2	East Makushita #8; 4–3	West Makushita #6; 5–2
1964	East Makushita #2; 5–2	East Jūryō #17; 8–7	East Jūryō #15; 8–7	West Jūryō #12; 6–9	East Jūryō #17; 7–8	West Makushita #1; 5–2
1965	West Jūryō #17; 8–7	East Jūryō #16; 9–6	East Jūryō #11; 7–8	West Jūryō #13; 8–7	East Jūryō #12; 11–4	West Jūryō #3; 8–7
1966	East Jūryō #3; 10–5	West Maegashira #13; 5–10	West Jūryō #4; 8–7	West Jūryō #1; 10–5	West Maegashira #13; 7–8	East Maegashira #15; 8–7
1967	East Maegashira #14; 5–10	West Jūryō #5; 8–7	West Jūryō #6; 9–6	East Jūryō #3; 12–3; Champion	West Maegashira #10; 11–4	East Maegashira #3; 6–9
1968	West Maegashira #6; 9–6	West Maegashira #1; 3–12	East Maegashira #10; 9–6	East Maegashira #4; 11–4; O★	East Komusubi #2; 8–7	West Komusubi #1; 4–11
1969	East Maegashira #4; 5–10	West Maegashira #7; 8–7	West Maegashira #4; 10–5	West Komusubi #1; 3–12	East Maegashira #6; 7–8	East Maegashira #7; 7–8
1970	East Maegashira #9; 9–6	East Maegashira #3; 2–13	East Maegashira #12; 10–5	East Maegashira #4; 5–10	East Maegashira #7; 9–6	East Maegashira #1; 1–14
1971	West Maegashira #10; 8–7	East Maegashira #7; 9–6	East Maegashira #1; 2–13	West Maegashira #10; 9–6	East Maegashira #5; 6–9	East Maegashira #8; 6–9
1972	East Maegashira #10; 10–5	East Maegashira #4; 5–10	East Maegashira #10; 5–10	West Jūryō #2; 6–9	East Jūryō #5; 8–7	West Jūryō #2; 11–4–P; Champion
1973	West Maegashira #10; 9–6	East Maegashira #5; 4–11	East Maegashira #12; 3–12	West Jūryō #6; 8–7	West Jūryō #4; 8–7	East Jūryō #3; 7–8
1974	West Jūryō #4; 8–7	East Jūryō #2; 7–8	West Jūryō #3; 6–9	West Jūryō #10; 9–6	East Jūryō #3; 6–9	West Jūryō #8; 8–7
1975	East Jūryō #5; 4–11	East Jūryō #13; Retired; 5–10	x	x	x	x
Record given as wins–losses–absences Top division champion Top division runner-up Retired Lower divisions Non-participation Sanshō key: F=Fighting spirit; O=Outstanding performance; T=Technique Also shown: ★=Kinboshi; P=Playoff(s); Divisions: Makuuchi — Jūryō — Makushita — Sandanme — Jonidan — Jonokuchi Makuuchi ranks: Yokozuna — Ōzeki — Sekiwake — Komusubi — Maegashira

== See also ==
- Glossary of sumo terms
- List of past sumo wrestlers
- List of sumo tournament top division runners-up
- List of sumo tournament second division champions
- List of komusubi
