= Kōtetsuyama Toyoya =

Japanese sumo wrestler (1942–1996)

Personal information
- Native name: 高鉄山 豊也
- Born: Konoshin Suga; July 9, 1942 Otaru, Hokkaidō, Japan
- Died: April 14, 1996 (aged 53)
- Height: 1.75 m (5 ft 9 in)
- Weight: 121 kg (267 lb)

Sport
- Sport: Sumo
- Retired: January, 1975
- Heya: Asahiyama
- Record: 661-668-10
- Debut: March, 1957
- Highest rank: Sekiwake (January, 1967)
- Elder name: Ōnaruto
- Championships: 1 (Jūryō)
- Special Prizes: Fighting spirit (1); Technique (1)
- Gold Stars: 2 (Sadanoyama, Taihō)
- Updated on June 2020

Kōtetsuyama Toyoya (高鉄山 豊也) (July 9, 1942 – April 14, 1996), born Kōnoshin Suga (菅 孝之進, Suga Kōnoshin), was a sumo wrestler from Otaru, Hokkaidō, Japan. His highest rank was sekiwake. After his retirement he became an elder of the Japan Sumo Association and the head coach of Onaruto stable.

== Career ==
He made his professional debut in March 1957, joining Asahiyama stable. He won the yūshō or tournament championship with a 13-2 record in the jūryō division in July 1963 and was promoted to the top makuuchi division in the following tournament in September 1963. He was demoted back to jūryō after only two tournaments and changed his shikona to Futasegawa, which had been the fighting name of his stablemaster. He won promotion back to makuuchi in July 1964 but was demoted again, this time after three tournaments. After switching back to the Kotetsuyama name he won promotion to makuuchi for the third time in May 1965 after a 12-3 jūryō runner-up performance, and this time stayed in the top division. He was runner-up to Taihō in March 1966, and won his first sanshō, for Fighting Spirit. In November 1966 he was runner-up for the second time, defeated yokozuna Sadanoyama to earn his first kinboshi, and received the Technique Prize. In the following tournament in January 1967 he was ranked at sekiwake, but scored only 3–12 and never reached the rank again. He is one of the rare examples of a wrestler whose only tournament in the sanyaku ranks was at sekiwake, rather than komusubi (along with Hayateumi and Hokutoriki). He earned a second kinboshi in July 1969 for beating Taihō, and remained a rank-and-file maegashira until March 1971, when a poor 1–14 record saw him demoted back to jūryō. He managed to return to makuuchi in November 1971 but was demoted to jūryō a number of times after that, his last makuuchi appearance coming in January 1974.

== Retirement from sumo ==
He retired in January 1975. He branched out from Asahiyama stable and established the Onaruto stable in October 1975. He produced the top division wrestler Itai, a pusher-thruster like himself who also briefly used the Kōtetsuyama shikona, and the lightweight jūryō wrestler Ishinriki. He was married to a ballet instructor. Onaruto stable closed in December 1994 and he left the Japan Sumo Association.

== Death ==
He died in somewhat mysterious circumstances in 1996, a month before claims he made about match-fixing in sumo were published in a book called Yaocho. The co-writer of the book died within hours of Onaruto, in the same hospital. Police found no evidence of foul play, but Onaruto's wrestler Itai later said his boss had links to a major yakuza crime syndicate.

== Fighting style ==
Kotetsuyama was short for a sumo wrestler at 175cm, but was known for the power of his pushing attack. He was very much an oshi-sumo specialist, who preferred pushing and thrusting at his opponents to fighting on the mawashi or belt. His most common winning kimarite or techniques at sekitori level were oshi-dashi (push out), tsuki-otoshi (thrust over) and hataki-komi (slap down).

== Career record ==
- The Nagoya tournament was first held in 1958.

Kōtetsuyama Toyoya
Year	January Hatsu basho, Tokyo	March Haru basho, Osaka	May Natsu basho, Tokyo	July Nagoya basho, Nagoya	September Aki basho, Tokyo	November Kyūshū basho, Fukuoka
1957	x	(Maezumo)	Shinjo; 2–1	Not held	West Jonidan #117; 5–3	East Jonidan #61; 2–6
1958	East Jonidan #71; 6–2	East Jonidan #45; 4–4	East Jonidan #43; 4–4	East Jonidan #37; 5–3	West Jonidan #22; 4–4	East Jonidan #20; 5–3
1959	East Jonidan #6; 3–5	East Jonidan #9; 6–2	East Sandanme #87; 5–3	West Sandanme #72; 5–3	East Sandanme #60; 6–2	West Sandanme #28; 7–1
1960	East Makushita #79; 5–3	East Makushita #66; 5–3	East Makushita #54; 3–5	West Makushita #59; 4–3	West Makushita #48; 6–1	East Makushita #30; 3–4
1961	West Makushita #4; 6–1	East Makushita #18; 2–5	East Makushita #31; 2–5	West Makushita #43; 5–2	East Makushita #30; 5–2	East Makushita #18; 5–2
1962	East Makushita #10; 4–3	West Makushita #6; 2–5	West Makushita #15; 3–4	West Makushita #17; 5–2	East Makushita #13; 6–1	West Makushita #4; 5–2
1963	West Jūryō #18; 9–6	West Jūryō #12; 8–7	East Jūryō #7; 9–6	West Jūryō #2; 13–2–P; Champion	East Maegashira #13; 7–8	East Maegashira #14; 5–10
1964	West Jūryō #2; 7–8	West Jūryō #4; 10–5	East Jūryō #2; 10–5	East Maegashira #14; 7–6–2	East Maegashira #15; 8–7	East Maegashira #15; 6–9
1965	West Jūryō #2; 8–7	West Jūryō #2; 12–3–P	East Maegashira #12; 8–7	West Maegashira #9; 8–7	East Maegashira #8; 6–9	West Maegashira #10; 9–6
1966	East Maegashira #6; 6–9	West Maegashira #9; 11–4; F	West Maegashira #2; 4–11	East Maegashira #6; 9–6	West Maegashira #1; 5–10	West Maegashira #4; 12–3; T★
1967	West Sekiwake #1; 3–12	West Maegashira #4; 8–7	East Maegashira #3; 5–10	East Maegashira #4; 7–8	West Maegashira #5; 8–7	West Maegashira #2; 6–9
1968	West Maegashira #5; 8–7	West Maegashira #2; 4–11	West Maegashira #7; 8–7	East Maegashira #3; 2–13	East Maegashira #11; 9–6	East Maegashira #8; 7–8
1969	West Maegashira #9; 10–5	East Maegashira #4; 5–10	West Maegashira #8; 8–7	East Maegashira #4; 6–9 ★	West Maegashira #5; 8–7	East Maegashira #2; 4–11
1970	East Maegashira #10; 9–6	West Maegashira #3; 5–10	West Maegashira #7; 6–9	East Maegashira #10; 7–8	West Maegashira #11; 8–7	East Maegashira #6; 7–8
1971	East Maegashira #8; 7–8	West Maegashira #10; 1–14	West Jūryō #7; 6–9	West Jūryō #11; 11–4	East Jūryō #2; 9–6	East Maegashira #12; 4–11
1972	West Jūryō #3; 9–6	West Maegashira #12; 9–6	West Maegashira #3; 5–10	East Maegashira #8; 8–7	East Maegashira #5; 8–7	East Maegashira #2; 3–12
1973	East Maegashira #11; 4–11	West Jūryō #4; 11–4–P	East Maegashira #13; 2–13	West Jūryō #8; 9–6	West Jūryō #3; 9–6	East Jūryō #1; 10–5
1974	East Maegashira #11; 3–12	West Jūryō #5; 6–9	East Jūryō #9; 9–6	East Jūryō #2; 4–11	West Jūryō #10; 9–6	West Jūryō #5; 5–10
1975	East Jūryō #12; Retired; 0–7–8	x	x	x	x	x
Record given as wins–losses–absences Top division champion Top division runner-up Retired Lower divisions Non-participation Sanshō key: F=Fighting spirit; O=Outstanding performance; T=Technique Also shown: ★=Kinboshi; P=Playoff(s); Divisions: Makuuchi — Jūryō — Makushita — Sandanme — Jonidan — Jonokuchi Makuuchi ranks: Yokozuna — Ōzeki — Sekiwake — Komusubi — Maegashira

== See also ==
- Glossary of sumo terms
- List of past sumo wrestlers
- List of sumo tournament top division runners-up
- List of sumo tournament second division champions
- List of sekiwake
