= Kurosegawa Kuniyuki =

Japanese sumo wrestler

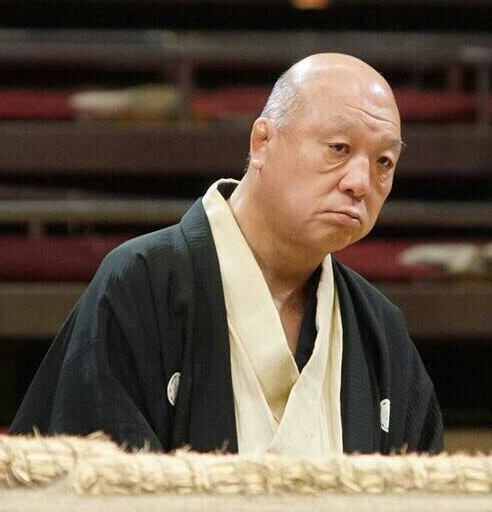

Personal information
- Native name: 黒瀬川 國行
- Born: Kensaku Sakai; 13 May 1951 (age 75) Higashimurayama, Tokyo, Japan
- Height: 1.84 m (6 ft 1/2 in)
- Weight: 133 kg (293 lb)

Sport
- Sport: Sumo
- Retired: May, 1984
- Heya: Isegahama
- Record: 561-563-11
- Debut: January, 1966
- Highest rank: Komusubi (January, 1980)
- Elder name: Kiriyama
- Championships: 1 (Jūryō); 1 (Makushita)
- Gold Stars: 3 Mienoumi (2); Wajima
- Updated on August 2012

Kurosegawa Kuniyuki (born 13 May 1951 as Kensaku Sakai) is a former sumo wrestler from Higashimurayama, Tokyo, Japan. He made his professional debut in January 1966, and reached the top division in May 1978. His highest rank was komusubi. He retired in May 1984 and became an elder in the Japan Sumo Association under the name Kiriyama. In 1995 he branched out from Isegahama stable and established his own Kiriyama stable, which shut down in 2011. He reached the mandatory retirement age of 65 in May 2016, but was re-hired by the Sumo Association for five years as a consultant. In September 2016 he was re-appointed as a judge of tournament bouts, following the demotion of Kasugayama. He left the Sumo Association upon turning 70 in May 2021.

== Career record ==
Kurosegawa Kuniyuki
Year	January Hatsu basho, Tokyo	March Haru basho, Osaka	May Natsu basho, Tokyo	July Nagoya basho, Nagoya	September Aki basho, Tokyo	November Kyūshū basho, Fukuoka
1966	(Maezumo)	(Maezumo)	East Jonokuchi #28; 2–5	West Jonokuchi #15; 3–4	West Jonokuchi #7; 5–2	West Jonidan #43; 3–4
1967	West Jonidan #55; 3–4	West Jonidan #63; 4–3	West Jonidan #74; 0–1–6	West Jonidan #114; 5–2	West Jonidan #62; 4–3	East Jonidan #35; 3–4
1968	East Jonidan #50; 5–2	West Jonidan #8; 2–5	East Jonidan #25; 3–4	West Jonidan #30; 5–2	East Sandanme #87; 4–3	West Sandanme #70; 3–4
1969	East Sandanme #76; 4–3	West Sandanme #56; 3–4	East Sandanme #62; 3–4	West Sandanme #69; 6–1	West Sandanme #28; 2–5	East Sandanme #47; 6–1
1970	East Sandanme #10; 5–2	East Makushita #45; 3–4	East Makushita #51; 2–5	East Sandanme #8; 2–5	West Sandanme #26; 5–2	East Sandanme #3; 4–3
1971	East Makushita #51; 5–2	West Makushita #34; 2–5	West Makushita #54; 4–3	West Makushita #50; 4–3	East Makushita #45; 6–1	East Makushita #18; 2–5
1972	West Makushita #33; 3–4	East Makushita #39; 3–4	East Makushita #45; 4–3	West Makushita #39; 7–0; Champion	East Makushita #4; 2–5	West Makushita #13; 2–5
1973	East Makushita #27; 4–3	East Makushita #23; 5–2	West Makushita #11; 6–1	East Makushita #3; 2–5	West Makushita #14; 4–3	East Makushita #12; 1–6
1974	West Makushita #38; 3–4	West Makushita #46; 4–3	West Makushita #37; 5–2	East Makushita #22; 4–3	West Makushita #17; 5–2	East Makushita #11; 4–3
1975	West Makushita #8; 3–4	West Makushita #14; 5–2	East Makushita #7; 5–2	East Makushita #2; 3–4	West Makushita #5; 3–4	East Makushita #10; 6–1
1976	East Makushita #2; 4–3	West Makushita #1; 6–1	West Jūryō #11; 7–8	West Jūryō #12; 8–7	East Jūryō #11; 6–9	West Jūryō #13; 9–6
1977	East Jūryō #7; 8–7	East Jūryō #5; 7–8	West Jūryō #6; 7–8	West Jūryō #8; 2–13	East Makushita #9; 5–2	West Makushita #3; 6–1
1978	East Jūryō #12; 11–4–P; Champion	West Jūryō #2; 9–6	West Maegashira #13; 9–6	East Maegashira #7; 5–10	West Maegashira #12; 9–6	East Maegashira #8; 6–9
1979	West Maegashira #10; 8–7	West Maegashira #5; 6–9	West Maegashira #7; 9–6	East Maegashira #2; 6–9	East Maegashira #6; 9–6	East Maegashira #1; 8–7
1980	West Komusubi #1; 6–9	East Maegashira #2; 5–10 ★★	East Maegashira #7; 8–7	East Maegashira #2; 3–12 ★	West Maegashira #10; 8–7	West Maegashira #3; 6–9
1981	East Maegashira #9; 7–8	East Maegashira #11; 6–8–1	East Maegashira #14; 6–9	East Jūryō #3; 6–9	East Jūryō #9; 9–6	West Jūryō #5; 10–5
1982	West Maegashira #13; 8–7	East Maegashira #8; 8–7	West Maegashira #3; 8–7	West Komusubi #1; 5–10	East Maegashira #4; 4–11	West Maegashira #11; 6–9
1983	East Maegashira #14; 4–11	West Jūryō #7; 10–5	West Jūryō #2; 7–8	West Jūryō #3; 7–8	West Jūryō #5; 8–7	East Jūryō #4; 6–9
1984	West Jūryō #7; 7–8	East Jūryō #8; 6–9	East Jūryō #11; Retired; 2–5–4	x	x	x
Record given as wins–losses–absences Top division champion Top division runner-up Retired Lower divisions Non-participation Sanshō key: F=Fighting spirit; O=Outstanding performance; T=Technique Also shown: ★=Kinboshi; P=Playoff(s); Divisions: Makuuchi — Jūryō — Makushita — Sandanme — Jonidan — Jonokuchi Makuuchi ranks: Yokozuna — Ōzeki — Sekiwake — Komusubi — Maegashira

== See also ==
- Glossary of sumo terms
- List of past sumo wrestlers
- List of sumo elders
- List of sumo tournament second division champions
- List of komusubi
