= Asahiyama stable =

Defunct sumo stable

Coordinates: 35.6908°N 139.8226°E

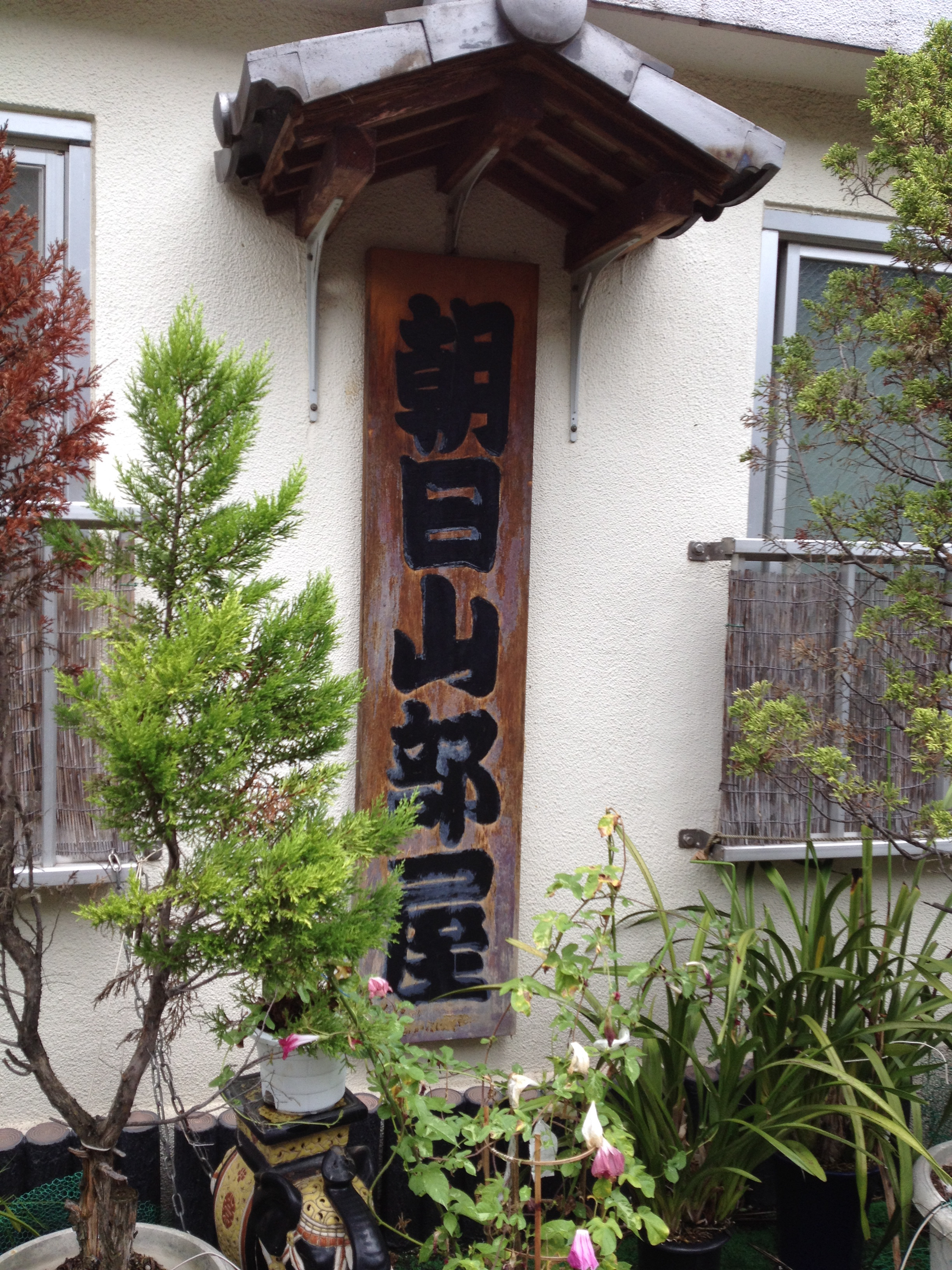

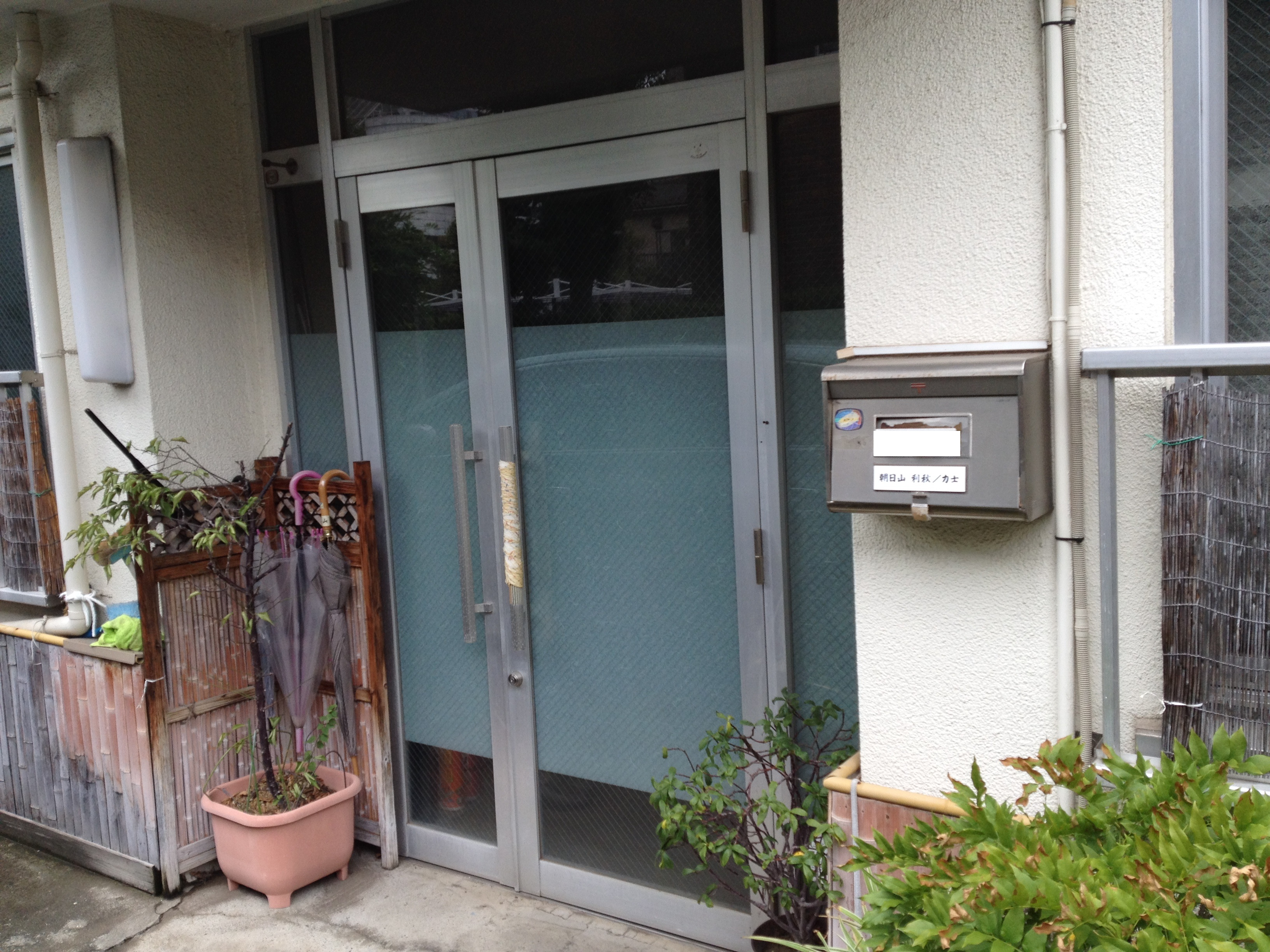
Entrance to the stable

Asahiyama stable (朝日山部屋, Asahiyama-beya) (1896–2015) was a sumo stable of the Isegehama group. It had a long history. It closed its doors in January 2015, and its staff and wrestlers transferred to other stables.

== History ==
In its active period, Asahiyama stable was one of the oldest continually-running stables in sumo, dating back to 1896. At the time of its closing it was the only stable still in existence that could trace its lineage back directly to the days of the once-rival Osaka sumo organization where it had a strong base, producing the 28th yokozuna Ōnishiki Daigorō in 1918. During the 1970s the stable was home to six Tongan wrestlers (including Sione Vailahi and Tonga Fifita) recruited by former maegashira Futaseyama, but when he died in 1975 they were caught up in a succession dispute between former maegashira Ryūō and the man who eventually became the new head, komusubi Wakafutase. They sided with Futaseyama's widow, who preferred Ryūō to take over, and were ultimately dismissed by the Japan Sumo Association. As a result of the controversy sumo officials had to fly to Tonga to explain themselves to the country's king, Tāufaʻāhau Tupou IV. Wakafutase led the stable until his death in 1997. He was succeeded by former ōzeki Daiju.

When Daiju reached retirement age in 2015 with no clear successor, the stable was closed. A number of staff and coaches and all of the active wrestlers (all being in the unsalaried divisions) transferred to Isegahama stable (the head stable of the same ichimon), while all other remaining staff transferred to Asakayama stable.

== Ring name conventions ==
Many wrestlers in the later years at this stable took ring names or shikona that began with the character 大 (read: dai), meaning large, in deference to their coach and the stable's owner, the former Daiju.

== Owner ==
- 1997–2015: 18th Asahiyama Toshiaki (yakuin taigū iin, ōzeki, Daiju, born 1950)
- 1975–1997: 17th Asahiyama Tadayuki (komusubi, Wakafutase, 1942–1997)
- 1963–1975: 16th Asahiyama Shōgo (maegashira 2, Futaseyama, 1921–1975)
- 1959–1963: 15th Asahiyama Shirōemon (sekiwake, Kōzuzan, 1919–1963)
- 1943–1959: 14th Asahiyama Shirōemon (sekiwake, Futasegawa, 1916–1959)
- 1918–1943: 13th Asahiyama Shirōemon (ōzeki Futasegawa)
- 1916–1918: 12th Asahiyama Daigorō (28th yokozuna Ōnishiki, 1883–1943)
- 1896–1916: 11th Asahiyama Shirōemon (maegashira Iwagatani)

== Notable wrestlers ==
- Kōtetsuyama (sekiwake, 1942–1996)
- Ryūō (maegashira 1, 1945–2015)
- Tokusegawa (maegashira 1, born 1983)
- Daihishō (maegashira 10, born 1973)
- Daimanazuru (maegashira 10, born 1977)
- Oniarashi (jūryō 7, born 1977)
- Yujiro Shirakawa (jonidan 99, born 1976) – became an actor and a singer.

== Notable staff ==
- Kiriyama Kuniyuki (iin, komusubi, Kurosegawa, born 1951)
- Shiraiwa (wakaimonogashira, jūryō 7, 1957–2022)
- Takarakuni (sewanin, maegashira 2, born 1956)
- Hideo (tate-yobidashi, Hidehito Yamaki, born 1949)

== See also ==
- List of sumo stables
- List of sumo elders
- List of active sumo wrestlers
- List of past sumo wrestlers
- List of years in sumo
- Glossary of sumo terms
