= Rise of nationalism in Europe =

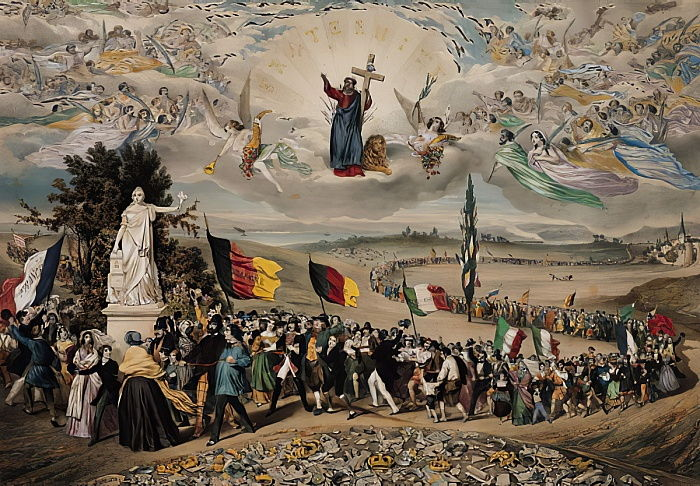
The Dream of Worldwide Democratic and Social Republics – The Pact Between Nations, a print prepared by Frédéric Sorrieu, 1848

In Europe, the emergence of nationalism was stimulated by the French Revolution and the Napoleonic Wars. American political science professor Leon Baradat has argued that "nationalism calls on people to identify with the interests of their national group and to support the creation of a state – a nation-state – to support those interests". Nationalism was the ideological impetus that, in a few decades, transformed Europe. Rule by monarchies and foreign control of territory was replaced by self-determination and newly formed national governments. Some countries, such as Germany and Italy were formed by uniting various regional states with a common "national identity". Others, such as Greece, Serbia, Bulgaria, and Poland were formed by uprisings against the Ottoman or Russian Empires. Romania is a special case, formed by the unification of the principalities of Moldavia and Wallachia in 1859 and later gaining independence from the Ottoman Empire in 1878.

== Background ==
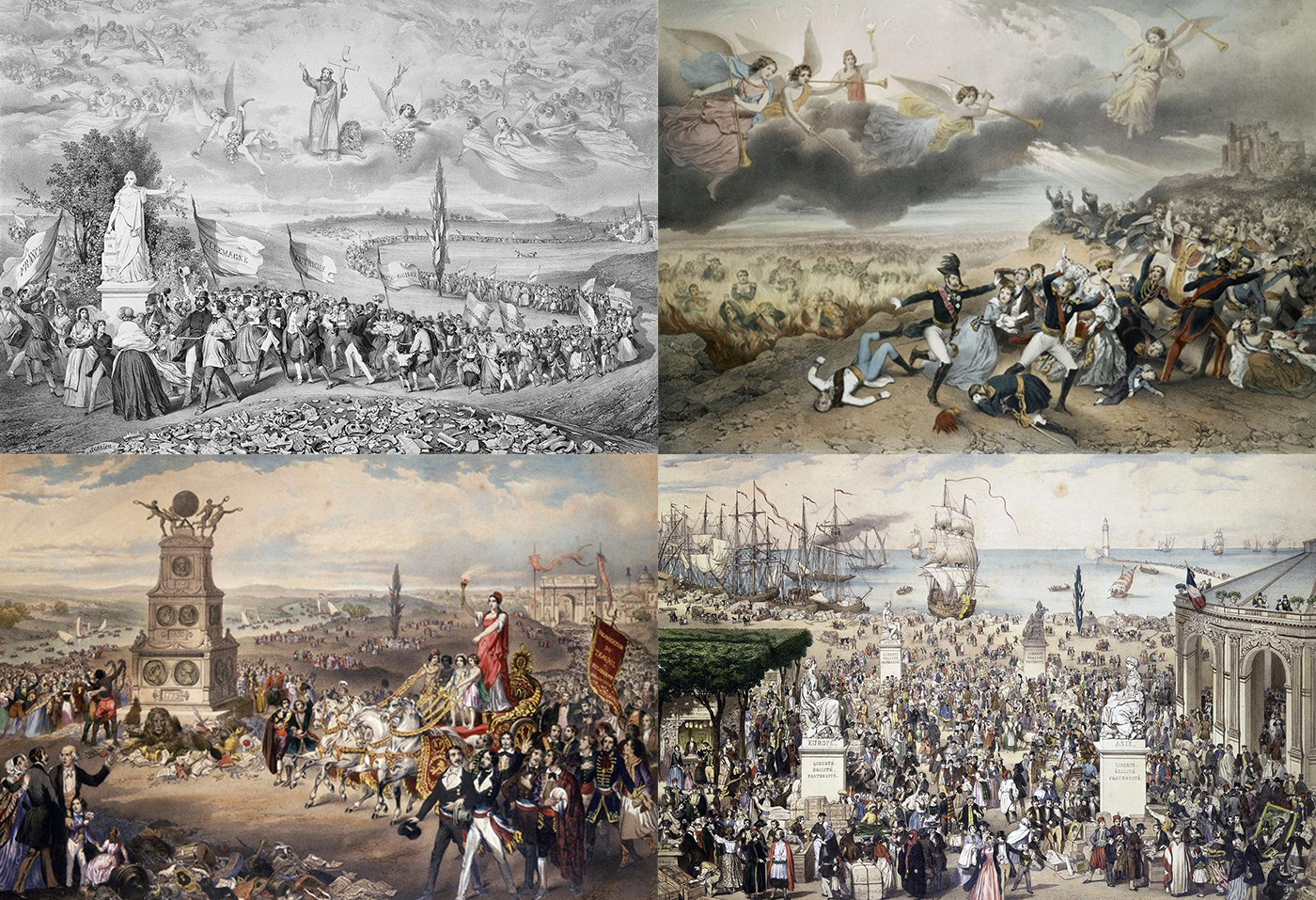
La République universelle démocratique et sociale, painted by Frédéric Sorrieu in 1848. Top left: Le Pacte; top right: Le Prologue, Bottom left: Le Triomphe; bottom right: Le Marché

National awakening also grew out of an intellectual reaction to the Enlightenment that emphasized national identity and developed an authentic view of cultural self-expression through nationhood. The key exponent of the modern idea of the nation-state was the German G. W. Friedrich Hegel. The French Revolution, although primarily a republican revolution, initiated a movement toward the modern nation-state and also played a key role in the birth of nationalism across Europe where radical intellectuals were influenced by Napoleon and the Napoleonic Code, an instrument for the political transformation of Europe. "Its twin ideological goals, nationalism and democracy, were given substance and form during the tumultuous events beginning at the end of the eighteenth century." Revolutionary armies carried the slogan of "liberty, equality, brotherhood" and ideas of liberalism and national self-determinism. He argued that a sense of nationality was the cement that held modern societies together in the age when dynastic and religious allegiance was in decline. In 1815, at the end of the Napoleonic Wars, the major powers of Europe met at the Congress of Vienna and tried to restore the old dynastic system as far as possible, ignoring the principle of nationality in favour of "legitimism", the assertion of traditional claims to royal authority. With most of Europe's peoples still loyal to their local province or city, nationalism was confined to small groups of intellectuals and political radicals. Furthermore, political repression, symbolized by the Carlsbad Decrees published in Austria in 1819, pushed nationalist agitation underground.

=== Pre-1848 revolutions ===
- 1789, French Revolution, national assembly.
- 1797, Napoleon establishes Sister Republics in Italy
- 1804–15, Serbian Revolution against the Ottoman Empire
- 1814, Norwegian independence attempt against Denmark-Norway and future Sweden & Norway, aftermath of the Napoleonic Wars (including War on independence)
- 1821–29, Greek War of Independence against the Ottoman Empire
- 1830, Croatian national revival
- 1830–31, Belgian Revolution, Revolution in Poland and Lithuania
- 1846, Uprising in the Greater Poland

== The struggle for independence ==
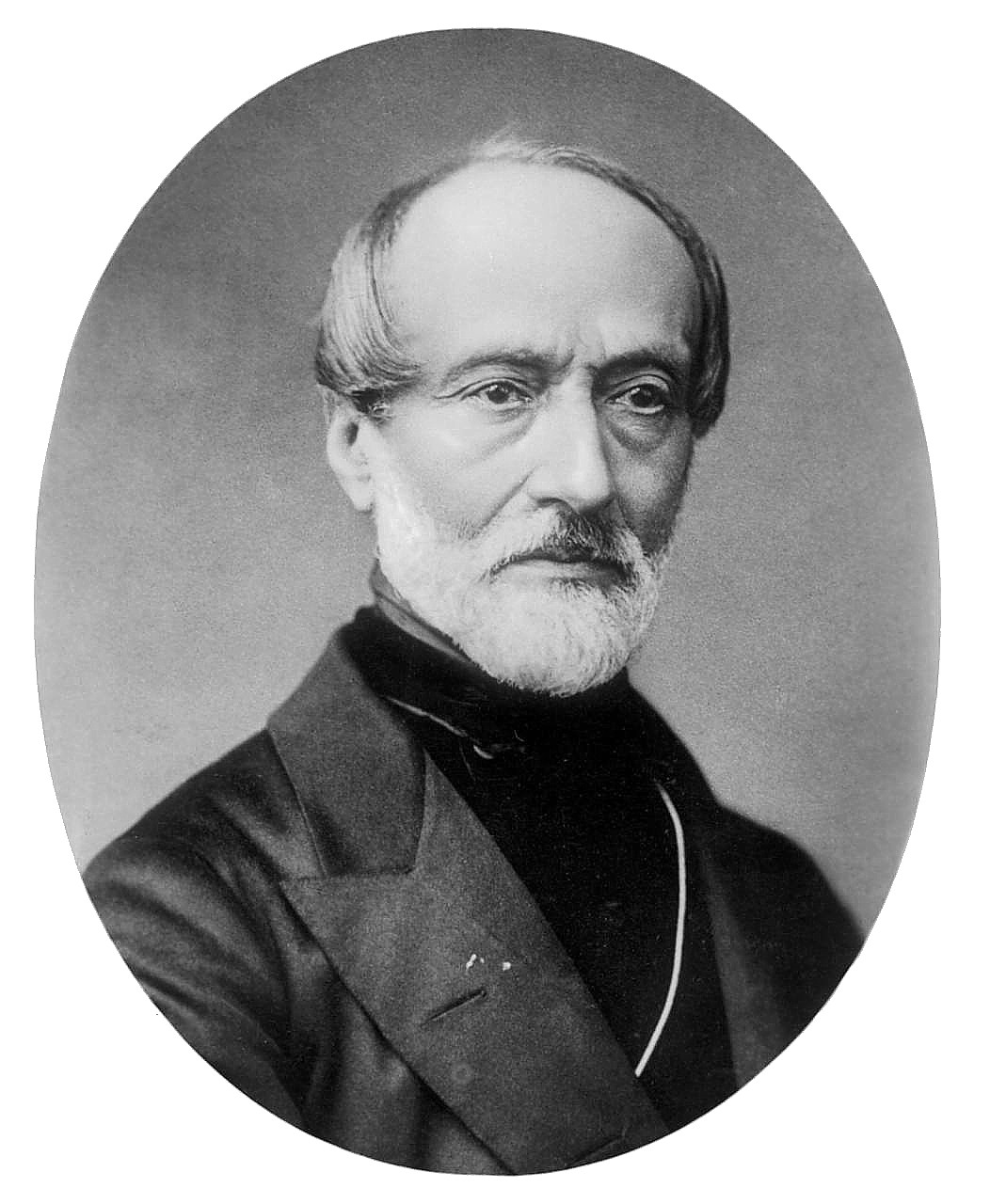
Giuseppe Mazzini, campaigner for Italian unification. His thoughts influenced many politicians of a later period, among them Woodrow Wilson, David Lloyd George, Mahatma Gandhi, Golda Meir and Jawaharlal Nehru.

A strong resentment of what came to be regarded as foreign rule began to develop. In Ireland, Italy, Belgium, Greece, Poland, Hungary, and Norway local hostility to alien dynastic authority started to take the form of nationalist agitation. The first revolt in the Ottoman Empire to acquire a national character was the Serbian Revolution (1804–17), which was the culmination of Serbian renaissance which had begun in Habsburg territory, in Sremski Karlovci. The eight-year Greek War of Independence (1821–29) against Ottoman rule led to an independent Greek state, although with major political influence of the great powers. The Belgian Revolution (1830–31) led to the recognition of independence from the Netherlands in 1839. Over the next two decades nationalism developed a more powerful voice, spurred by nationalist writers championing the cause of self-determination. The Poles attempted twice to overthrow Russian rule in 1831 and 1863. In 1848, revolutions broke out across Europe, sparked by severe famine and economic crisis and mounting popular demand for political change. In Italy, Giuseppe Mazzini used the opportunity to encourage a war mission: "A people destined to achieve great things for the welfare of humanity must one day or other be constituted a nation."

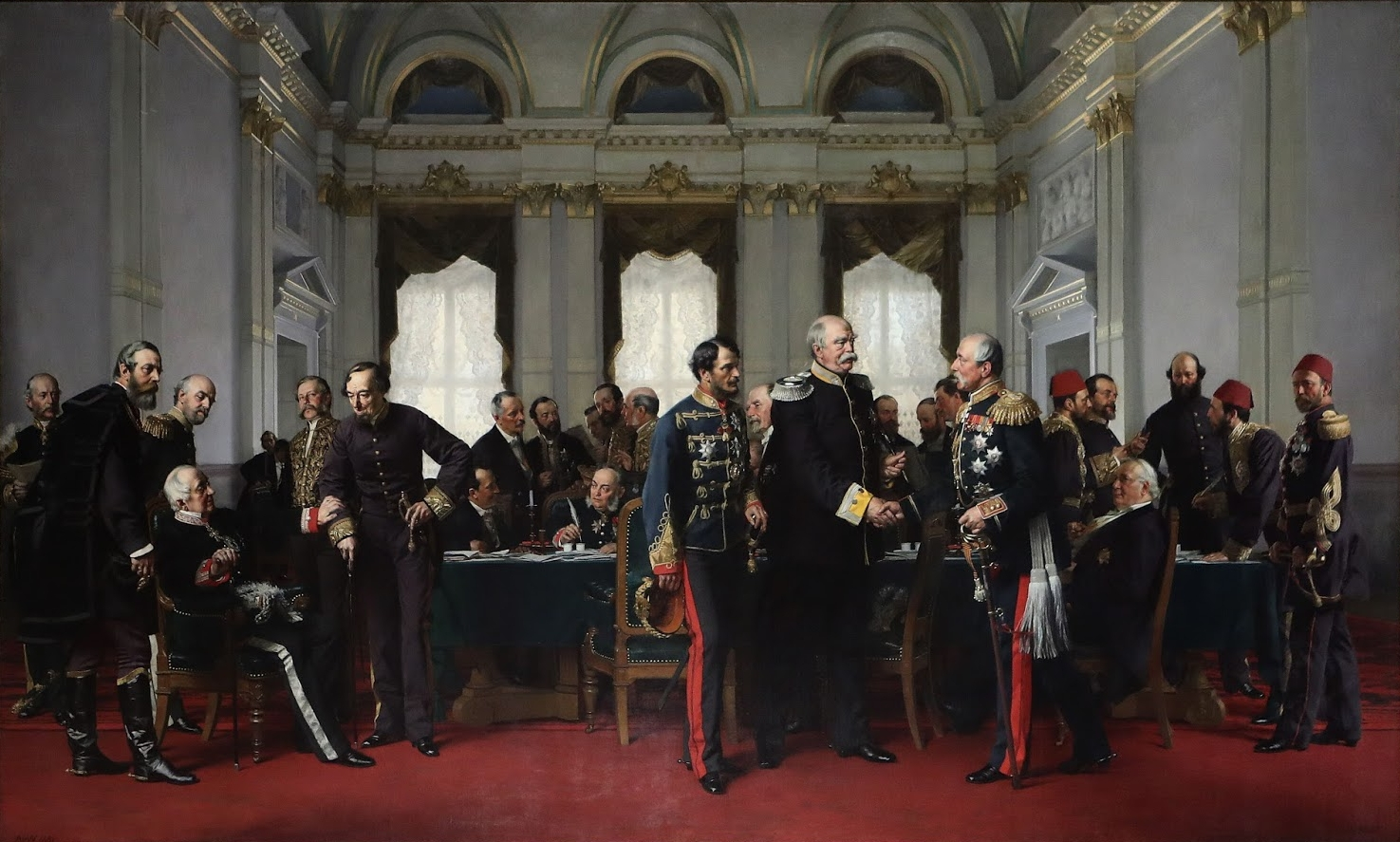
Congress of Berlin 1878

In Hungary, Lajos Kossuth led a national revolt against Habsburg rule; in Transylvania, Avram Iancu led successful revolts in 1846. The 1848 crisis had given nationalism its second full public airing, and in the thirty years that followed no fewer than seven new national states were created in Europe. This was partly the result of the recognition by conservative forces that the old order could not continue in its existing form. Conservative reformers such as Cavour and Bismarck made common cause with liberal political modernizers to create a consensus for the creation of conservative nation-states in Italy and Germany. In the Habsburg monarchy a compromise was reached with Hungarians in 1867 which led to the establishment of the Dual Monarchy. Native history and culture were rediscovered and appropriated for the national struggle. Following a conflict between Russia and Turkey, the Great Powers met at Berlin in 1878 and granted independence to Romania, Serbia and Montenegro and limited autonomy to Bulgaria.

== Nationalism's growth and export ==
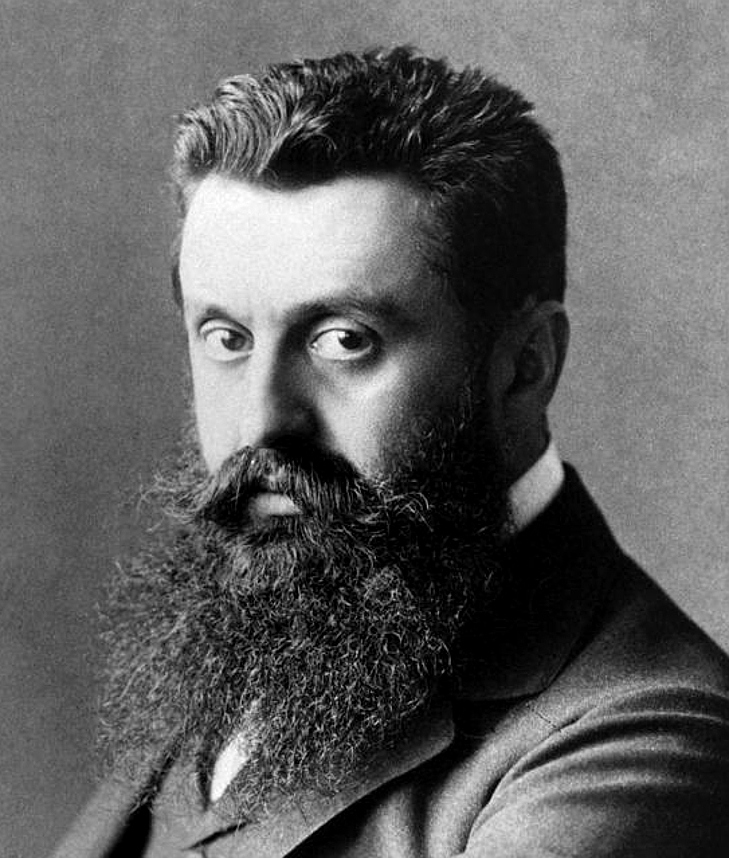
Theodor Herzl

The invention of a symbolic national identity became the concern of racial, ethnic or linguistic groups throughout Europe as they struggled to come to terms with the rise of mass politics, the decline of the traditional social elites, popular discrimination and xenophobia. Within the Habsburg monarchy the different peoples developed a more mass-based, radical and exclusive form of nationalism. This developed even among the Germans and Magyars, who actually benefited from the power-structure of the empire. On the European periphery, especially in Ireland and Norway, campaigns for national independence became more strident. In 1905, Norway won independence from Sweden, but attempts to grant Ireland a kind of autonomy foundered on the national divisions on the island between the Catholic and Protestant populations. The Polish attempts to win independence from Russia had previously proved to be unsuccessful, with Poland being the only country in Europe whose autonomy was gradually limited rather than expanded throughout the 19th century, as a punishment for the failed uprisings; in 1831 Poland lost its status as a formally independent state and was merged into Russia as a real union country and in 1867 she became nothing more than just another Russian province. Faced with internal and external resistance to assimilation, as well as increased xenophobic anti-Semitism, radical demands began to develop among the stateless Jewish population of eastern and central Europe for their own national home and refuge. In 1897, inspired by the Hungarian-born Jewish nationalist Theodor Herzl, the First Zionist Congress was held in Basle, and declared their national 'home' should be in Palestine. By the end of the period, the ideals of European nationalism had been exported worldwide and were now beginning to develop, and both compete and threaten the empires ruled by colonial European nation-states. Anti-colonial intellectuals in Africa and Asia had adopted the nation-state concept for their own revolutionary means and started treating their multiethnic homelands as single countries.

Now, within the modern era, nationalism continues to rise in Europe, but in the form of anti-globalization. In a study recently conducted, researchers found that Chinese import shock from globalization leads to uneven adjustment costs being spread across regions of Europe. In response, there has been an increase in support for nationalist and radical-right wing parties in Europe that promote anti-globalist policies.

== Revolutionary organizations of Europe ==
- Serb revolutionary organizations
- Greek revolutionary organizations
- Albanian revolutionary organizations
- Internal Macedonian Revolutionary Organization

== See also ==
- Communitarianism
- Cultural competence
- Cultural identity
- Expansionism
- Identity politics
- Irish nationalism
- National flag
- National personification
- Romantic nationalism
- Society of United Irishmen
- Nation state
- Wars of national liberation
- Populism in Europe
