= Kosturino =

Kosturino may refer to:

- Kosturino, Bulgaria
- Kosturino, North Macedonia
