= Svidovica =

Svidovica Свидовица
- Village
- Location within North Macedonia
- Coordinates: 41.390165°N 22.697366°E
- Country: North Macedonia
- Region: Southeastern
- Municipality: Strumica

Population (2021)
  - Total: 292
- Time zone: UTC+1 (CET)
  - Summer (DST): UTC+2 (CEST)
- Website: .

Svidovica (Macedonian: Свидовица) is a village in the municipality of Strumica, North Macedonia. It used to be part of the former municipality of Kukliš.

== Demographics ==
According to the 2002 census, the village had a total of 325 inhabitants. Ethnic groups in the village include:

- Macedonians 309
- Turks 16

As of 2021, the village of Svidovica has 292 inhabitants and the ethnic composition was the following:

- Macedonians – 247
- Turks – 10
- Persons Without Data – 35
