= Raborci =

Raborci Раборци
- Village
- Location within North Macedonia
- Coordinates: 41.396817°N 22.600177°E
- Country: North Macedonia
- Region: Southeastern
- Municipality: Strumica

Population (2021)
  - Total: 77
- Time zone: UTC+1 (CET)
  - Summer (DST): UTC+2 (CEST)
- Website: .

Raborci (Macedonian: Раборци) is a village in the municipality of Strumica, North Macedonia. It used to be part of the former municipality of Kukliš.

== Demographics ==
According to the 2002 census, the village had a total of 105 inhabitants. Ethnic groups in the village include:

- Macedonians 105

As of 2021, the village of Raborci has 77 inhabitants and the ethnic composition was the following:

- Macedonians – 1.104
- Albanians – 1
- others – 1
- Person without Data - 11
