= Dorlombos =

Dorlombos Дорломбос
- Village
- Location within North Macedonia
- Coordinates: 41.338501°N 22.670335°E
- Country: North Macedonia
- Region: Southeastern
- Municipality: Strumica

Population (2021)
  - Total: 52
- Time zone: UTC+1 (CET)
  - Summer (DST): UTC+2 (CEST)
- Website: .

Dorlombos (Macedonian: Дорломбос) is a village in the municipality of Strumica, North Macedonia. It used to be part of the former municipality of Kukliš.

== Demographics ==
As of the 2021 census, Dorlombos had 52 residents with the following ethnic composition:

- Turks 49
- Others 2
- Persons for whom data are taken from administrative sources 1

According to the 2002 census, the village had a total of 117 inhabitants. Ethnic groups in the village include:

- Turks 117
