= Rič =

Rič Рич
- Village
- Location within North Macedonia
- Coordinates: 41.443009°N 22.519993°E
- Country: North Macedonia
- Region: Southeastern
- Municipality: Strumica

Population (2021)
  - Total: 315
- Time zone: UTC+1 (CET)
  - Summer (DST): UTC+2 (CEST)
- Website: .

Rič (Macedonian: Рич) is a village in the municipality of Strumica, North Macedonia.

== Demographics ==
According to the 2002 census, the village had a total of 382 inhabitants. Ethnic groups in the village include:

- Macedonians 381
- Serbs 1

As of 2021, the village of Rich has 315 inhabitants and the ethnic composition was the following:

- Macedonians – 291
- Person without Data - 24
