= Dobrejci =

Dobrejci Добрејци
- Village
- Location within North Macedonia
- Coordinates: 41.460041°N 22.651506°E
- Country: North Macedonia
- Region: Southeastern
- Municipality: Strumica

Population (2002)
  - Total: 1,764
- Time zone: UTC+1 (CET)
  - Summer (DST): UTC+2 (CEST)
- Website: .

Dobrejci (Macedonian: Добрејци) is a village in the municipality of Strumica, North Macedonia.

== Demographics ==
According to the 2002 census, the village had a total of 1,764 inhabitants. Ethnic groups in the village include:

- Macedonians 1,764

As of 2021, the village of Dobrejci has 1.507 inhabitants and the ethnic composition was the following:

- Macedonians – 1.373
- Turks – 1
- others – 4
- Person without Data - 129
