= Popčevo =

Popčevo Попчево
- Village
- Location within North Macedonia
- Coordinates: 41.415193°N 22.591480°E
- Country: North Macedonia
- Region: Southeastern
- Municipality: Strumica

Population (2021)
  - Total: 221
- Time zone: UTC+1 (CET)
  - Summer (DST): UTC+2 (CEST)
- Website: .

Popčevo (Macedonian: Попчево) is a village in the municipality of Strumica, North Macedonia.

== Demographics ==
According to the 2002 census, the village had a total of 343 inhabitants. Ethnic groups in the village include:

- Macedonians 342
- Others 1

As of 2021, the village of Popchevo has 221 inhabitants and the ethnic composition was the following:

- Macedonians – 203
- others – 1
- Person without Data - 17
