= Romantic nationalism =

Type of nationalism

Liberty Leading the People, embodying the Romantic view of the French Revolution of 1830, also known as the July Revolution; its painter Eugène Delacroix also served as an elected deputy

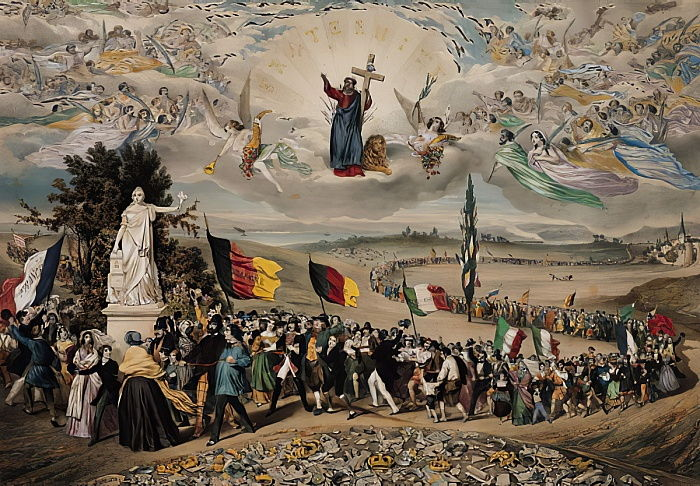
The Dream of Worldwide Democratic and Social Republics – The Pact Between Nations, a print prepared by Frédéric Sorrieu, 1848

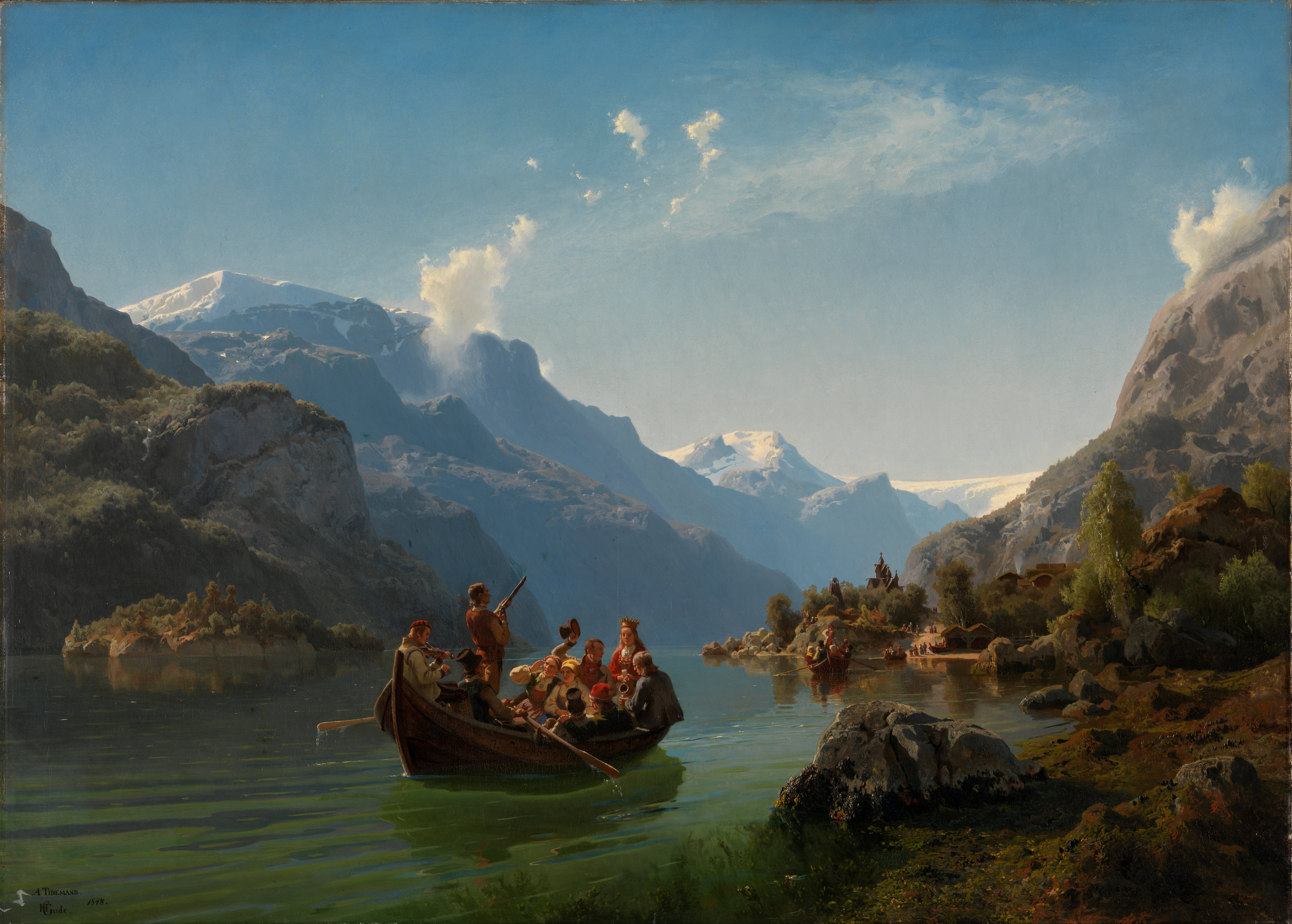
Brudeferd i Hardanger (Bridal procession in Hardanger), a monumental piece within Norwegian romantic nationalism. Painted by Hans Gude and Adolph Tidemand.

Romantic nationalism (also national romanticism, organic nationalism, identity nationalism) is the form of nationalism in which the state claims its political legitimacy as an organic consequence of the unity of those it governs. This includes such factors as language, race, ethnicity, culture, religion, and customs of the nation in its primal sense of those who were born within its culture. It can be applied to ethnic nationalism as well as civic nationalism. Romantic nationalism arose in reaction to dynastic or imperial hegemony, which assessed the legitimacy of the state from the top down, emanating from a monarch or other authority, which justified its existence. Such downward-radiating power might ultimately derive from a god or gods (see the divine right of kings and the Mandate of Heaven).

Among the key themes of Romanticism, and its most enduring legacy, the cultural assertions of romantic nationalism have also been central in post-Enlightenment art and political philosophy. From its earliest stirrings, with their focus on the development of national languages and folklore, and the spiritual value of local customs and traditions, to the movements that would redraw the map of Europe and lead to calls for self-determination of nationalities, nationalism was one of the key issues in Romanticism, determining its roles, expressions and meanings. Romantic nationalism, resulting from this interaction between cultural production and political thought, became "the celebration of the nation (defined in its language, history and cultural character) as an inspiring ideal for artistic expression; and the instrumentalization of that expression in political consciousness-raising".

Historically in Europe, the watershed year for romantic nationalism was 1848, when a revolutionary wave spread across the continent; numerous nationalistic revolutions occurred in various fragmented regions (such as Italy) or multinational states (such as the Austrian Empire). While initially the revolutions fell to reactionary forces and the old order was quickly re-established, the many revolutions would mark the first step towards liberalisation and the formation of modern nation states across much of Europe.

== Brief history ==
=== Nationalism and revolution ===
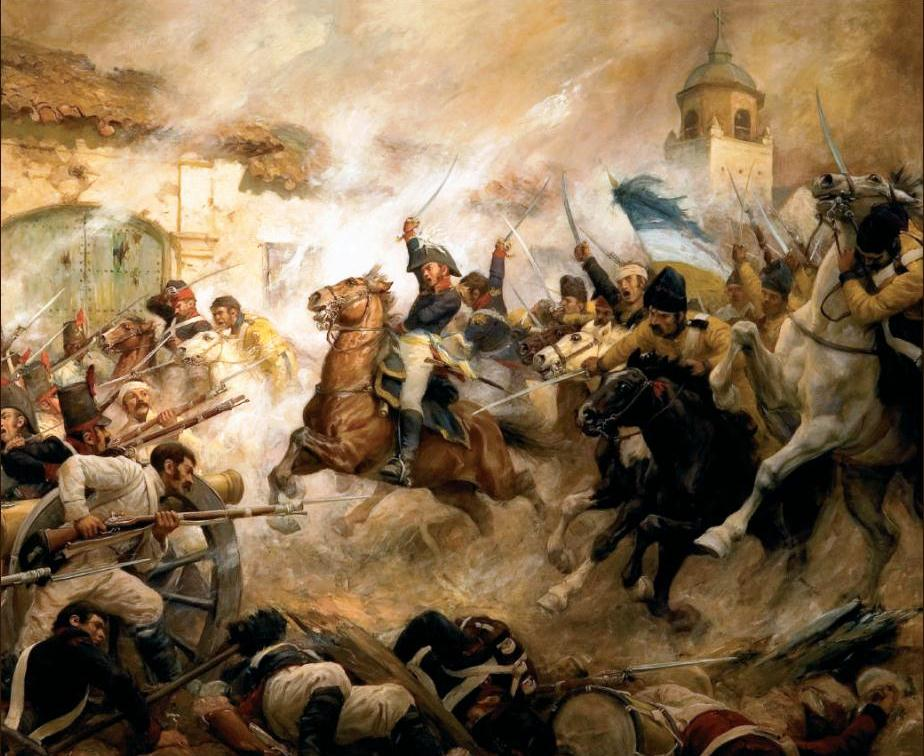
Romanticized painting of the Battle of Rancagua during the Chilean War of Independence by Pedro Subercaseaux

In the Balkans, Romantic views of a connection with classical Greece, which inspired Philhellenism infused the Greek War of Independence (1821–30), in which the Romantic poet Lord Byron died of high fever. Rossini's opera William Tell (1829) marked the onset of the Romantic opera, using the central national myth unifying Switzerland; and in Brussels, a riot (August 1830) after an opera that set a doomed romance against a background of foreign oppression (Auber's La Muette de Portici) sparked the Belgian Revolution of 1830–31, the first successful revolution in the model of Romantic nationalism. Verdi's opera choruses of an oppressed people inspired two generations of patriots in Italy, especially with "Va pensiero" (Nabucco, 1842). Under the influence of romantic nationalism, among economic and political forces, both Germany and Italy found political unity, and movements to create nations similarly based upon ethnic groups. It would flower in the Balkans (see for example, the Carinthian Plebiscite, 1920), along the Baltic Sea, and in the interior of Central Europe, where in the eventual outcome, the Habsburgs succumbed to the surge of Romantic nationalism.

In Norway, romanticism was embodied, not in literature, but in the movement toward a national style, both in architecture and in ethos. Earlier, there was a strong romantic nationalist element mixed with Enlightenment rationalism in the rhetoric used in North America, in the American colonists' declaration of independence from Great Britain and the drafting of the U.S. Constitution of 1787, as well as the rhetoric in the wave of rebellions, inspired by new senses of localized identities, which swept the American colonies of Spain, one after the other, from the May Revolution of Argentina in 1810.

=== Conservatism and revolution in the 19th century ===
Following the ultimate collapse of the First French Empire with the fall of Napoleon, conservative elements took control in Europe, led by the Austrian noble Klemens von Metternich, ideals of the balance of power between the great powers of Europe dominated continental politics of the first half of the 19th century. Following the Congress of Vienna, and subsequent Concert of Europe system, several major empires took control of European politics. Among these were the Russian Empire; the restored French monarchy; the German Confederation, under the dominance of Prussia; the Austrian Empire; and the Ottoman Empire.

The conservative forces held sway until the Revolutions of 1848 swept across Europe and threatened the old order. Numerous movements developed around various cultural groups, who began to develop a sense of national identity. While initially, all of these revolutions failed, and reactionary forces would re-establish political control, the revolutions marked the start of the steady progress towards the end of the Concert of Europe under the dominance of a few multi-national empires and led to the establishment of the modern nation state in Europe; a process that would not be complete for over a century and a half. Central and Eastern Europe's political situation was partly shaped by the two World Wars, while many national identities in these two regions formed modern nation states when the collapse of the Soviet Union and the multinational states Yugoslavia and Czechoslovakia led to numerous new states forming during the last decade of the 20th century.

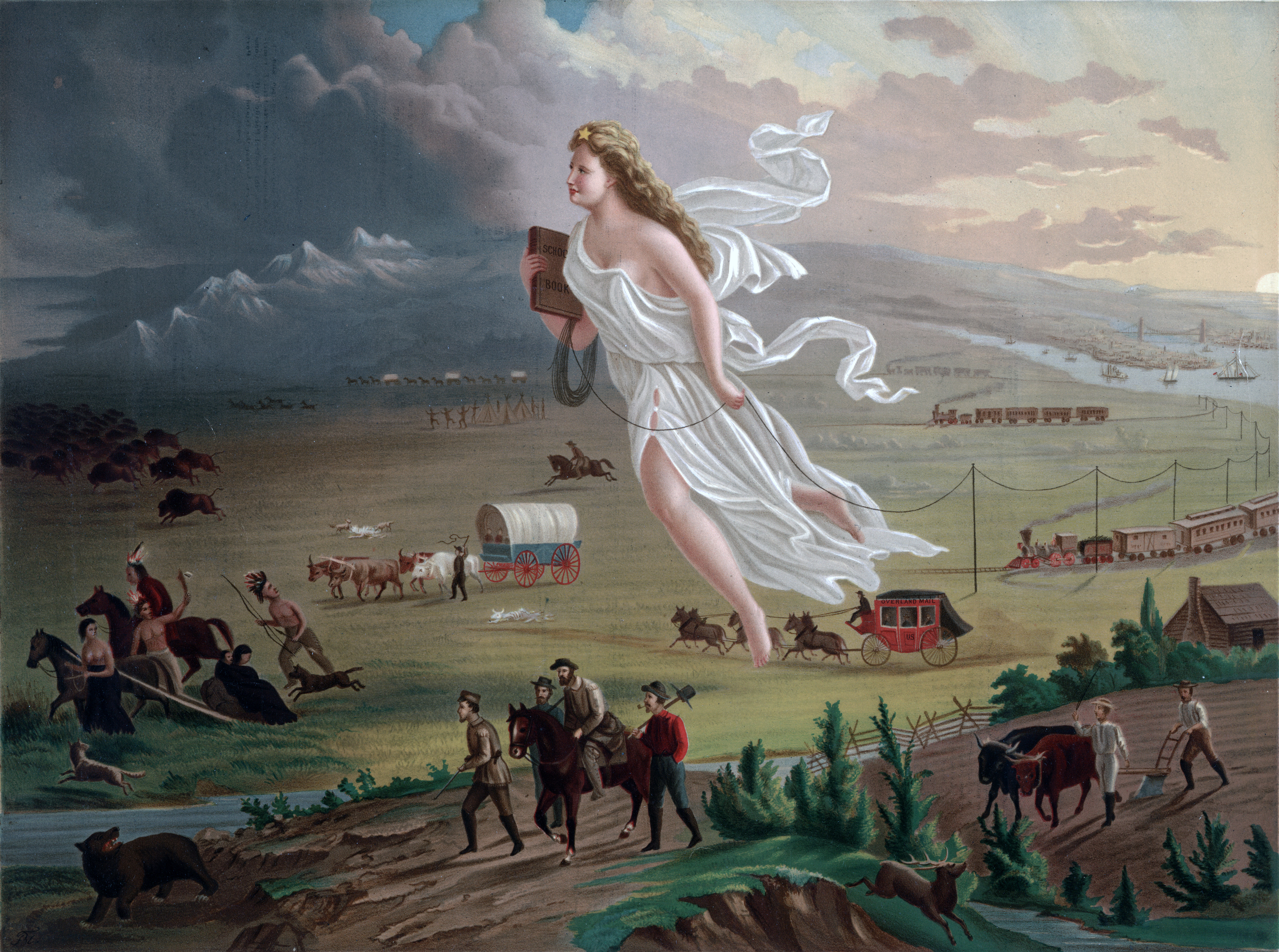
John Gast, American Progress, (circa 1872) celebrates U.S. romantic nationalism in the form of westward expansion – an idea known as "Manifest Destiny".

=== Folk culture ===
Romantic nationalism inspired the collection of folklore by such people as the Brothers Grimm. The view that fairy tales, unless contaminated from outside literary sources, were preserved in the same form over thousands of years, was not exclusive to Romantic Nationalists, but it fit in well with their views that such tales expressed the primordial nature of a people.

The Brothers Grimm were criticized because their first edition was insufficiently German, and they followed the advice. They rejected many tales they collected because of their similarity to tales by Charles Perrault, which they thought proved they were not truly German tales; Sleeping Beauty survived in their collection because the tale of Brynhildr convinced them that the figure of the sleeping princess was authentically German. They also altered the language used, changing each "Fee" (fairy) to an enchantress or wise woman, every "prince" to a "king's son", every "princess" to a "king's daughter". Discussing these views in their third editions, they particularly singled out Giambattista Basile's Pentamerone as the first national collection of fairy tales, and as capturing the Neapolitan voice.

The work of the Brothers Grimm influenced other collectors, both inspiring them to collect tales and leading them to similarly believe that the fairy tales of a country were particularly representative of it, to the neglect of cross-cultural influence. Among those influenced were the Russian Alexander Afanasyev, the Norwegians Peter Christen Asbjørnsen and Jørgen Moe, and the Australian Joseph Jacobs.

=== National epics ===
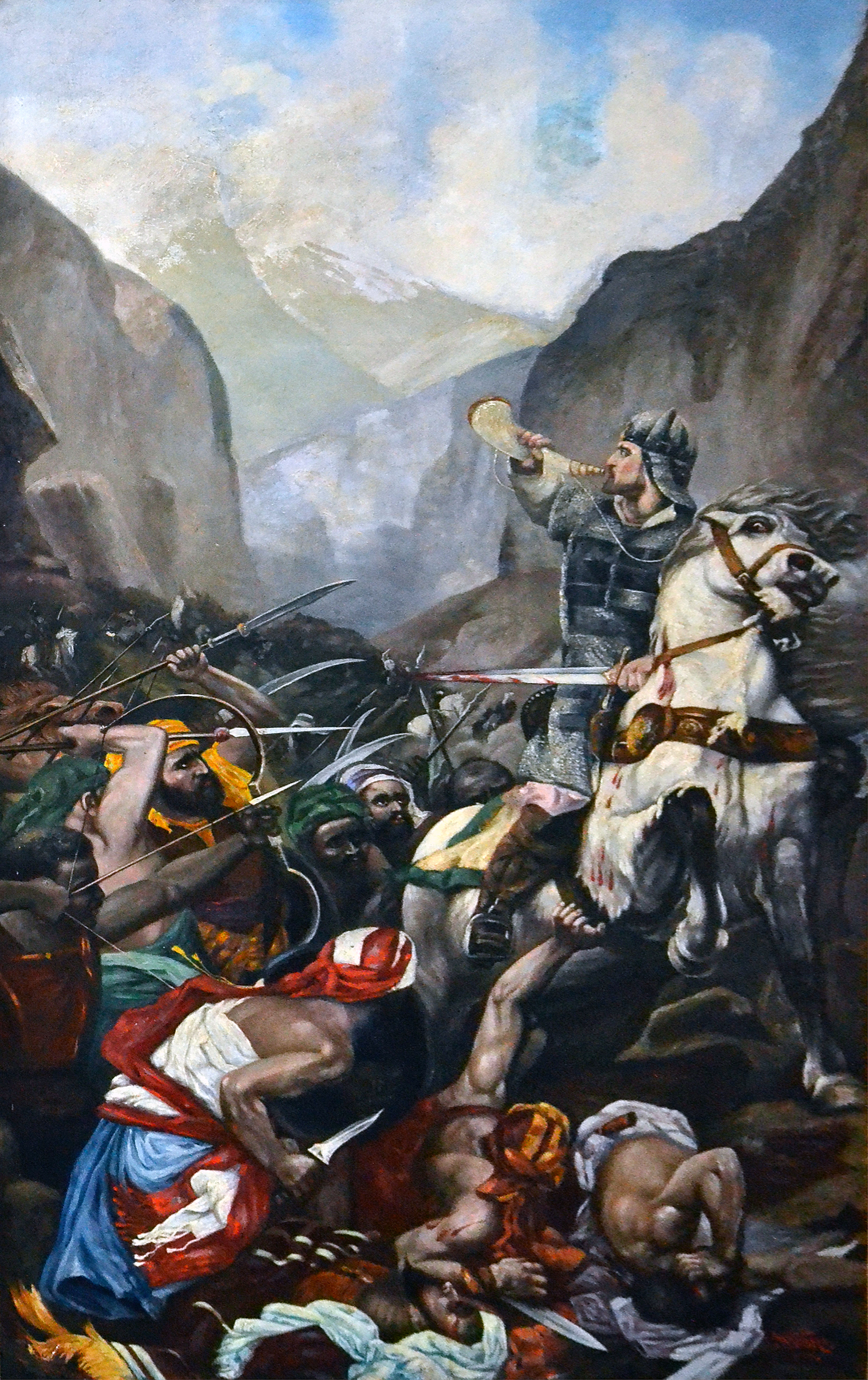
A painting of an episode from the Song of Roland, a French national epic

The concept of a "national epic", an extensively mythologized legendary work of poetry of defining importance to a certain nation, is another product of Romantic nationalism. The "discovery" of Beowulf in a single manuscript, first transcribed in 1818, came under the impetus of Romantic nationalism, after the manuscript had lain as an ignored curiosity in scholars' collections for two centuries. Beowulf was felt to provide people self-identified as "Anglo-Saxon" with their missing "national epic", just when the need for it was first being felt: the fact that Beowulf himself was a Geat was easily overlooked. The pseudo-Gaelic literary forgeries of "Ossian" had failed, finally, to fill the need for the first Romantic generation.

The first publication of The Tale of Igor's Campaign coincided with the rise in Russian national spirit in the wake of the Napoleonic wars and Suvorov's campaigns in Central Europe. The unseen and unheard Song of Roland had become a dim memory, until the antiquary Francisque Michel transcribed a worn copy in the Bodleian Library and put it into print in 1837; it was timely: French interest in the national epic revived among the Romantic generation. In Greece, the Iliad and Odyssey took on new urgency during the Greek War of Independence. Amongst the world's Jewish community, the early Zionists considered the Bible a more suitable national epic than the Talmud.

Many other "national epics", epic poetry considered to reflect the national spirit, were produced or revived under the influence of Romantic nationalism: particularly in the Russian Empire, national minorities seeking to assert their own identities in the face of Russification produced new national poetry – either out of whole cloth, or from cobbling together folk poetry, or by resurrecting older narrative poetry. Examples include the Estonian Kalevipoeg, Finnish Kalevala, Polish Pan Tadeusz, Latvian Lāčplēsis, Armenian Sasuntzi Davit by Hovhannes Tumanyan, Georgian The Knight in the Panther's Skin and Greater Iran, Shahnameh.

== German Romantic nationalism ==
The Romantic movement was essential in spearheading the upsurge of German nationalism in the 19th century and especially the popular movement aiding the resurgence of Prussia after its defeat to Napoleon in the 1806 Battle of Jena. Johann Gottlieb Fichte's 1808 Addresses to the German Nation, Heinrich von Kleist's fervent patriotic stage dramas before his death, and Ernst Moritz Arndt's war poetry during the anti-Napoleonic struggle of 1813–15 were all instrumental in shaping the character of German nationalism for the next one-and-a-half century in a racialized ethnic rather than civic nationalist direction. Romanticism also played a role in the popularization of the Kyffhäuser myth, about the Emperor Frederick Barbarossa sleeping atop the Kyffhäuser mountain and being expected to rise in a given time and save Germany) and the legend of the Lorelei (by Brentano and Heine) among others.

The Nazi movement later appropriated the nationalistic elements of Romanticism, with Nazi chief ideologue Alfred Rosenberg writing: "The reaction in the form of German Romanticism was therefore as welcome as rain after a long drought. But in our own era of universal internationalism, it becomes necessary to follow this racially linked Romanticism to its core, and to free it from certain nervous convulsions which still adhere to it." Joseph Goebbels told theatre directors on 8 May 1933, just two days before the Nazi book burnings in Berlin, that: "German art of the next decade will be heroic, it will be like steel, it will be Romantic, non-sentimental, factual; it will be national with great pathos, and at once obligatory and binding, or it will be nothing."

Of this phenomenon, the Soviet literary scholar Naum Berkovsky wrote:

German fascism extracted Romanticism from the naphthalene of the past, established its ideological kinship with it, included it in its canon of forerunners, and after some cleansing on racial grounds, absorbed it into the system of its ideology and thereby gave this trend, which in its time was not apolitical, a purely political and topical meaning ... Schelling, Adam Müller and others thanks to the fascists again became our contemporaries, though in the specific sense in which every corpse taken out of its century-old coffin for any need becomes a "contemporary". In his book The Tasks of National Socialist Literary Criticism, Walther Linden, who revised the history of German literature from a fascist point of view, considers the most valuable for fascism that stage in the development of German Romanticism when it freed itself from the influences of the French Revolution and thanks to Adam Müller, Görres, Arnim and Schelling began to create truly German national literature on the basis of German medieval art, religion and patriotism.

This made scholars and critics like Fritz Strich, Thomas Mann and Victor Klemperer, who before the war were supporters of Romanticism, to reconsider their stance after the war and the Nazi experience and to adopt a more anti-Romantic position.

Heinrich Heine parodied such Romantic modernizations of medieval folkloric myths in the "Barbarossa" chapter of his large 1844 poem Germany. A Winter's Tale:

Forgive, O Barbarossa, my hasty words!
I do not possess a wise soul
Like you, and I have little patience,
So, please, come back soon, after all!

Retain the old methods of punishment,
If you judge the guillotine unpleasant:
The sword for the nobleman, and the cord
For the townsman and vulgar peasant.

But, do switch things around, now and then:
Peasants and townsmen should die by the sword,
And noblemen should hang on a rope.
We’re all the creatures of the Lord!

Bring back the laws of Charles the Fifth,
With the hanging courts restoration,
And divide the people, as before,
Into guild, estate and corporation.

Restore the old Holy Roman Empire,
As it was, whole and immense.
Bring back all its musty junk,
And all its foolish nonsense.

The Middle Ages I’ll endure,
If you bring back the genuine item;
Just rescue us from this bastard state,
And from its farcical system,

From that mongrel chivalry,
Such a nauseating dish
Of Gothic fancies and modern deceit,
That is neither flesh nor fish.

Shut down all the theatres,
And chase their comedians pack,
Who parody the olden days.
O, Emperor, do come back!

== Polish nationalism and messianism ==
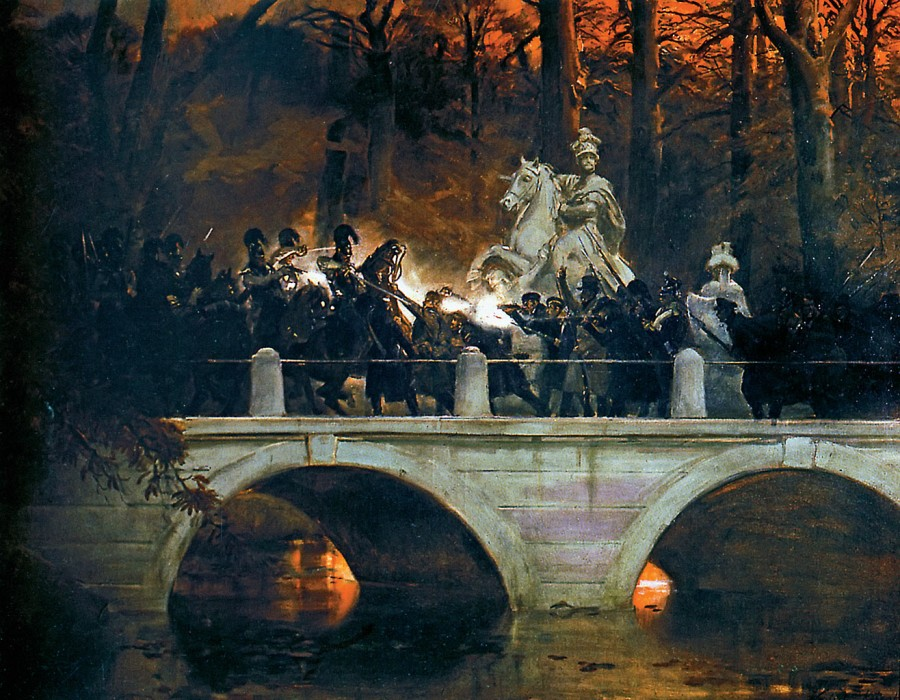
The November Uprising (1830–31), in the Kingdom of Poland, against the Russian Empire

Romanticism played an essential role in the national awakening of many Central European peoples lacking their own national states, not least in Poland, which had recently failed to restore its independence when Russia's army crushed the Polish Uprising under Nicholas I. Revival and reinterpretation of ancient myths, customs and traditions by Romantic poets and painters helped to distinguish their indigenous cultures from those of the dominant nations and crystallise the mythography of Romantic nationalism. Patriotism, nationalism, revolution and armed struggle for independence also became popular themes in the arts of this period. Arguably, the most distinguished Romantic poet of this part of Europe was Adam Mickiewicz, who developed an idea that Poland was the Messiah of Nations, predestined to suffer just as Jesus had suffered to save all the people. The Polish self-image as a "Christ among nations" or the martyr of Europe can be traced back to its history of Christendom and suffering under invasions. During the periods of foreign occupation, the Catholic Church served as bastion of Poland's national identity and language, and the major promoter of Polish culture. The partitions came to be seen in Poland as a Polish sacrifice for the security for Western civilization. Adam Mickiewicz wrote the patriotic drama Dziady (directed against the Russians), where he depicts Poland as the Christ of Nations. He also wrote "Verily I say unto you, it is not for you to learn civilization from foreigners, but it is you who are to teach them civilization ... You are among the foreigners like the Apostles among the idolaters". In Books of the Polish Nation and Polish Pilgrimage Mickiewicz detailed his vision of Poland as a Messias and a Christ of Nations, that would save mankind. Dziady is known for various interpretation. The most known ones are the moral aspect of part II, individualist and romantic message of part IV, as well as deeply patriotic, messianistic and Christian vision in part III of the poem. Zdzisław Kępiński, however, focuses his interpretation on Slavic pagan and occult elements found in the drama. In his book Mickiewicz hermetyczny he writes about hermetic, theosophic and alchemical philosophy on the book as well as Masonic symbols.

== Arts ==
Church of the Savior on Blood, St Petersburg, 1883–1907

After the 1870s "national romanticism", as it is more usually called, became a familiar movement in the arts. Romantic musical nationalism is exemplified by the work of Bedřich Smetana, especially the symphonic poem "Vltava". In Scandinavia and the Slavic parts of Europe especially, "national romanticism" provided a series of answers to the 19th-century search for styles that would be culturally meaningful and evocative, yet not merely historicist. When a church was built over the spot in St Petersburg where Tsar Alexander II of Russia had been assassinated, the "Church of the Savior on Blood", the natural style to use was one that best evoked traditional Russian features (illustration, left). In Finland, the reassembly of the national epic, the Kalevala, inspired paintings and murals in the National Romantic style that substituted there for the international Art Nouveau styles. The foremost proponent in Finland was Akseli Gallen-Kallela (illustration, below right).

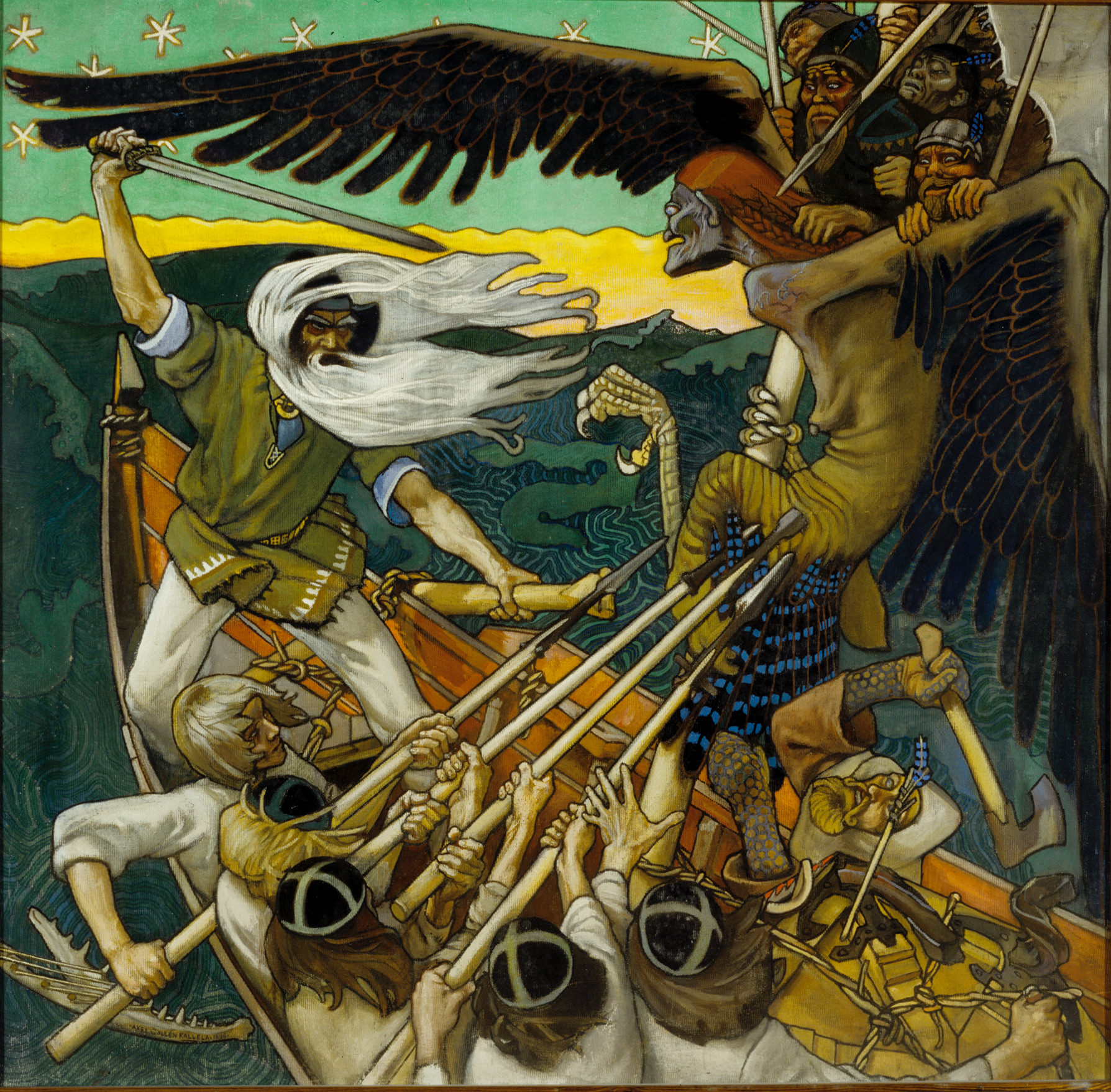
The Defense of the Sampo, Akseli Gallen-Kallela, 1896

By the turn of the century, ethnic self-determination had become an assumption held as being progressive and liberal. There were romantic nationalist movements for separation in Finland, Estonia, Latvia and Lithuania, the Kingdom of Bavaria held apart from a united Germany, and Czech and Serb nationalism continued to trouble Imperial politics. The flowering of arts which drew inspiration from national epics and song continued unabated. The Zionist movement revived Hebrew, and began immigration to Eretz Yisrael, and Welsh and Irish tongues also experienced a poetic revival.

=== Claims of primacy or superiority ===
At the same time, linguistic and cultural nationality, colored with pre-genetic concepts of race, bolstered two rhetorical claims used to this day: claims of primacy and claims of superiority. Primacy is the claimed inalienable right of a culturally and racially defined people to a geographical terrain, a "heartland" (a vivid expression) or homeland. Richard Wagner notoriously argued that those who were ethnically different could not comprehend the artistic and cultural meaning inherent in national culture. Identifying "Jewishness" even in musical style, he specifically attacked the Jews as being unwilling to assimilate into German culture, and thus unable to truly comprehend the mysteries of its music and language. Sometimes "national epics" such as the Nibelunglied have had a galvanizing effect on social politics.

=== Twentieth-century political developments ===
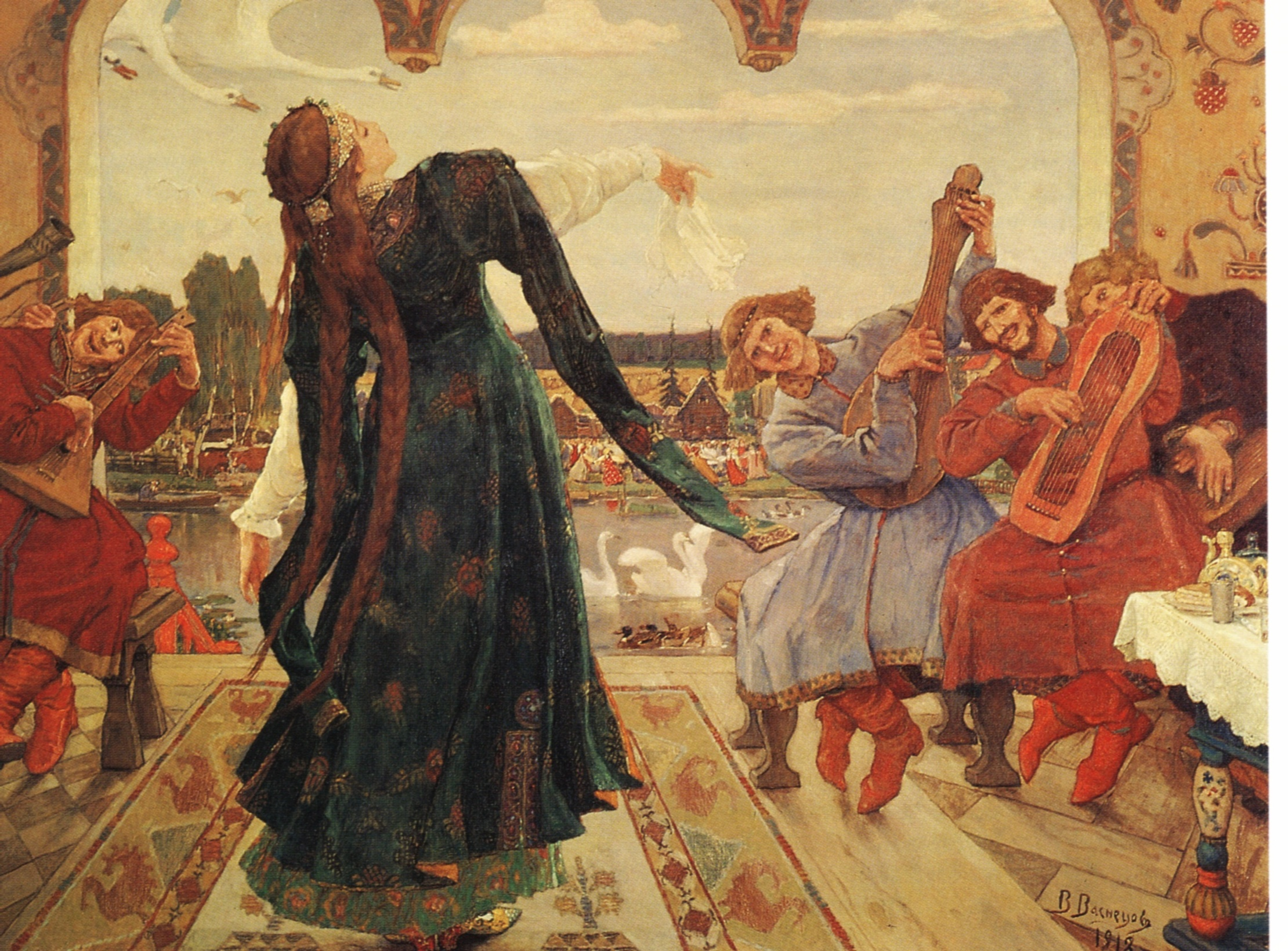
Frog Tsarevna, by Viktor Vasnetsov, 1918

In the first two decades of the 20th century, Romantic Nationalism as an idea was to have crucial influence on political events. Following the Panic of 1873 that gave rise to a new wave of antisemitism and racism in the German Empire politically ruled by an authoritarian, militaristic conservatism under Otto von Bismarck and in parallel with the Fin de siècle (which was also reflected to a degree in the contemporary art movements of symbolism, the Decadent movement, and Art Nouveau), the racialist völkisch movement which grew out of romantic nationalism in Germany in the late 19th century.

The rising nationalistic and imperialistic tensions between the European nations throughout the Fin de siècle period eventually erupted in the First World War. After Germany had lost the war and undergone the tumultuous German Revolution, the völkisch movement drastically radicalized itself in Weimar Germany under the harsh terms of the Treaty of Versailles, and Adolf Hitler would go on to say that "the basic ideas of National-Socialism are völkisch, just as the völkisch ideas are National-Socialist".

== See also ==
- Britishness
- Chosen people / People of God
- Civil religion
- Classical radicalism
- Conservatism
- Danish Golden Age
- Englishness
- Ethnic nationalism
- German question
- Gothicism
- Hindutva
- Historiography and nationalism
- Jews as the chosen people
- Norwegian romantic nationalism
- Pochvennichestvo
- Polytheistic reconstructionism
- Scandinavism
- Musical nationalism
- Nationalism
- National anthem
- National epic
- National treasure
- Patriotism
- Rise of nationalism in Europe

== Sources ==
- Adam Zamoyski; Holy Madness: Romantics, Patriots and Revolutionaries 1776-1871; (Weidenfeld & Nicolson, 1999);
- Johann Gottlieb Fichte, Thirteenth Address, Addresses to the Gerrnan Nation, ed. George A. Kelly (New York: Harper Torch Books, 1968).
- Encyclopedia of Romantic Nationalism in Europe, ed. Joep Leerssen (2 vols.; Amsterdam University Press, 2018) ISBN 9789462981188
