= Building of the Assembly of the Municipality of Strumica =

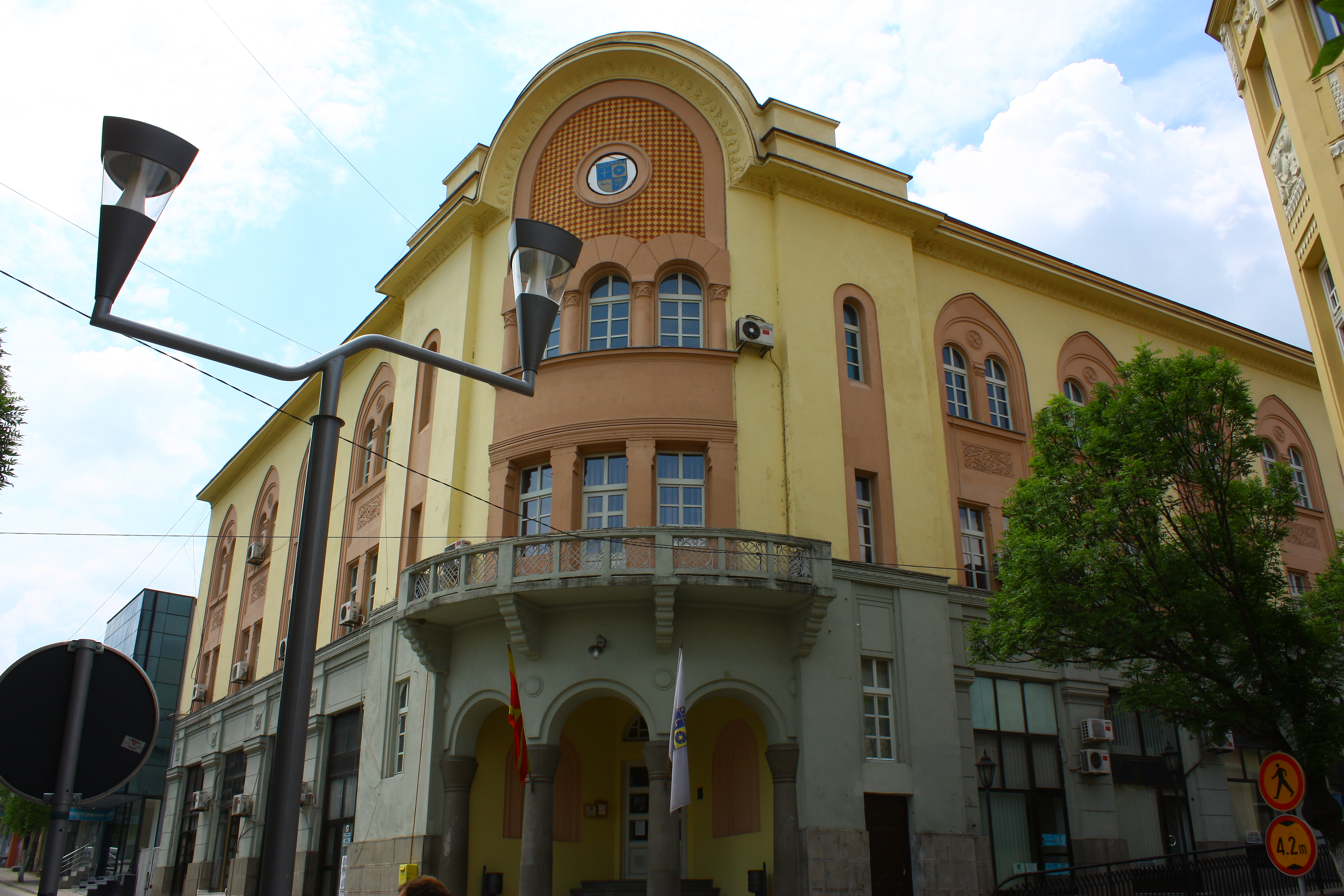
- The building in May 2011

- Location within North Macedonia
- Former names: Municipality House (Општински дом)

General information
- Type: Government building
- Location: 1 Sando Masev, Strumica, North Macedonia
- Coordinates: 41°26′13.7″N 22°38′13.5″E
- Construction started: 1926
- Completed: 1931
- Client: Strumica Municipality

The Building of the Assembly of the Municipality of Strumica (Macedonian: Зграда на Собранието на општина Струмица) is the seat of the Strumica Municipality and a cultural heritage of North Macedonia.

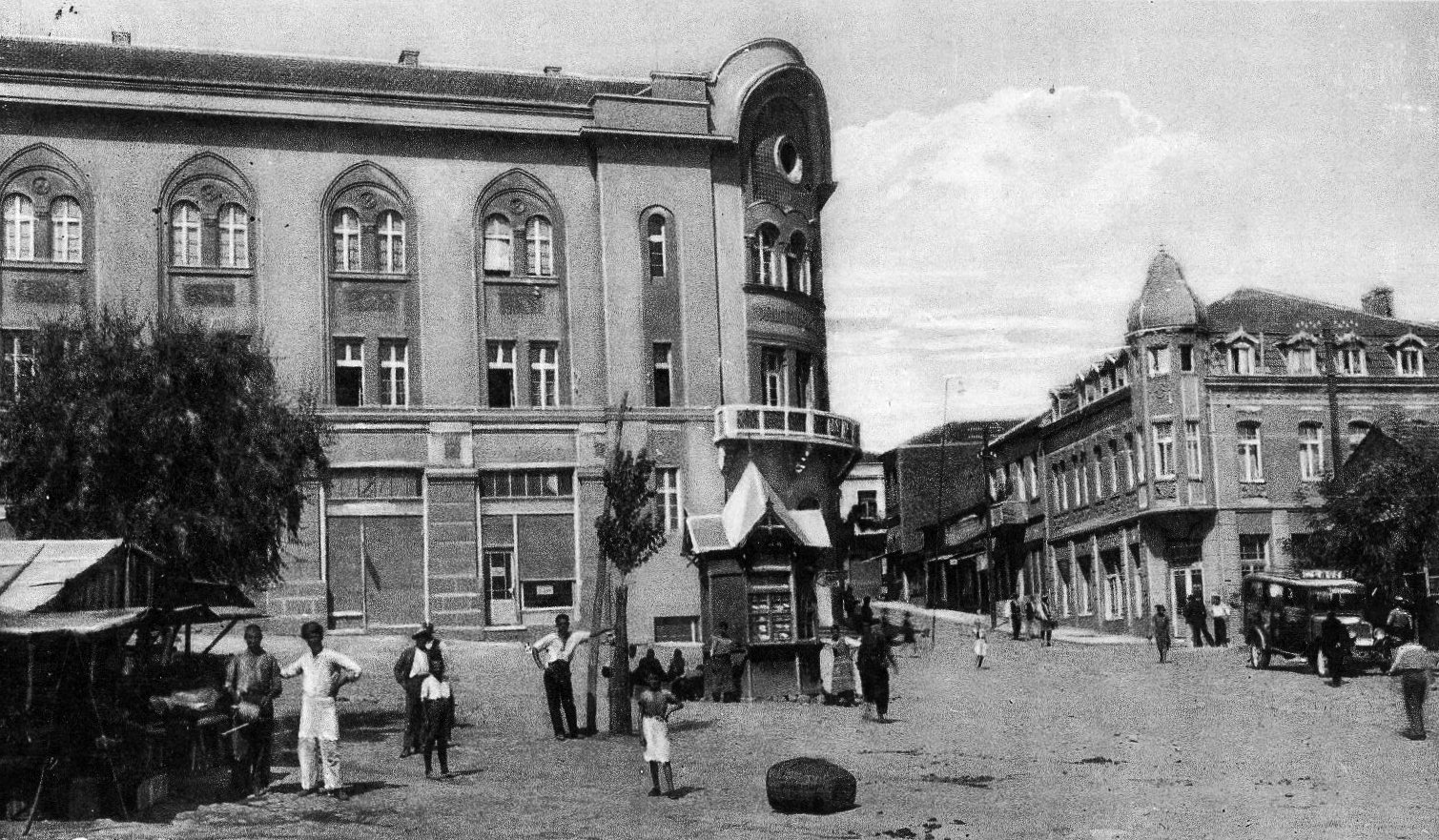
Postcard of the city center, looking towards the building, c. 1930s.

During the early years of Yugoslavia, the local government of Strumica did not yet have its own seat. The construction of the Municipality House (Serbian: Општински дом) officially started in 1926 when the foundations were laid.
