= Čepeli =

Čepeli Дабиље
- Village
- Location within North Macedonia
- Coordinates: 41°22′23″N 22°32′53″E
- Country: North Macedonia
- Region: Southeastern
- Municipality: Strumica

Population (2021)
  - Total: 0
- Time zone: UTC+1 (CET)
  - Summer (DST): UTC+2 (CEST)
- Website: .

Čepeli (Macedonian: Чепели) is a village in the municipality of Strumica, North Macedonia.

== Demographics ==
According to the statistics of Vasil Kanchov ("Macedonia, Ethnography and Statistics") from 1900, 460 inhabitants, all Turks, lived in Čepeli. According to Dimitar Gadzhanov, in 1916, 1,017 Turks lived in Čepeli. According to a German map issued in 1941, based on the 1931 census, the village had 550 Turks. Since the 1971 census, the village of Čepeli has no inhabitants.
