= Battle of Krivolak =

1915 battle

Coordinates: 41.5272°N 22.1208°E

- Part of Balkans Theatre of World War I
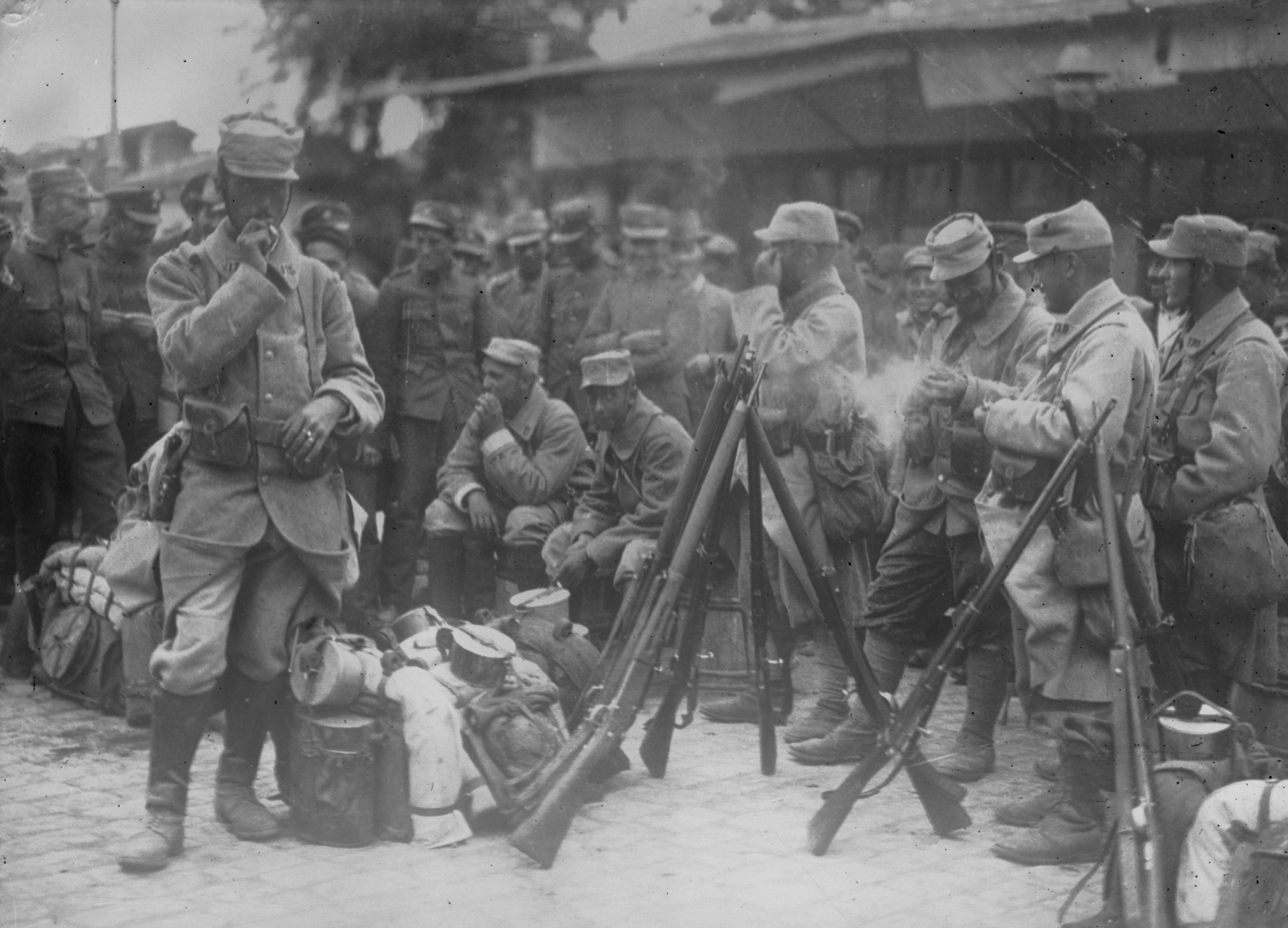
- French soldiers resting in Thessaloniki, 1915
| Date | 21 October – 22 November 1915 |
| Location | Krivolak, Kingdom of Serbia (present-day North Macedonia) |
| Result | Bulgarian victory |

Belligerents
| Bulgaria | France |

Commanders and leaders
| (Tsardom of Bulgaria (1908–1946)) Georgi Todorov; (Tsardom of Bulgaria (1908–1946)) Stefan Bogdanov | (French Third Republic) Maurice Sarrail; (French Third Republic) Maurice Bailloud; (French Third Republic) C. de Lardemelle |

Units involved
| (Tsardom of Bulgaria (1908–1946)) 2nd Army: 11th Division | (French Third Republic) 57th Division; (French Third Republic) 122nd Division; (French Third Republic) 156th Division |

Strength
| 1 army | 3 divisions |

Casualties and losses
| 5,877 | 3,161; 10 artillery pieces lost; 12 machine guns lost; 36 ammunition wagons captured |

The Battle of Krivolak (in Bulgarian: Криволашко сражение, Битка при Криволак) was a World War I battle, fought between 21 October and 22 November 1915. It was fought in the initial stage of the Macedonian campaign, in the Balkans Theatre. On 21 October, Bulgarian troops attacked the French-held positions near the Strumica rail station, at the time part of the Kingdom of Serbia (present-day North Macedonia), starting the battle. Fighting continued until 22 November, when two Serbian divisions failed to capture Skopje, thus rendering the continuation of Entente offensive operations dangerous and forcing the French to evacuate their forces from the region.

The Entente defeat at Krivolak and the follow-up battle of Kosturino led to the complete withdrawal of Allied forces from Serbia, thus enabling the Central Powers to re-open the Berlin to Constantinople rail line. The Allies, in the meantime, consolidated their defenses in Greece.

== Prelude ==
The 28 June 1914, assassination of Austro-Hungarian heir presumptive Archduke Franz Ferdinand precipitated Austria-Hungary's declaration of war against Serbia. The conflict quickly attracted the involvement of all major European countries, pitting the Central Powers against the Entente coalition and starting World War I. After the entry of the Ottoman Empire into the war on the side of the Central Powers (November 1914), the decisive factor in the Balkans became the attitude of Bulgaria. Bulgaria occupied a strategically important position on the Serbian flank, and its intervention on either side of the belligerents would be decisive. Bulgaria and Serbia had fought each other twice in the previous thirty years: in the Serbo-Bulgarian War of 1885 and the Second Balkan War of 1913. Bulgaria had suffered defeat in 1913, and the Bulgarian government and people generally felt that Serbia had stolen land which rightfully belonged to Bulgaria. While the Allies could only offer Bulgaria small territorial concessions from Serbia and neutral Greece, the Central Powers' promises appeared far more enticing, offering to cede most of the land, which Bulgaria claimed. With the Allied defeats at the Battle of Gallipoli (April 1915 to January 1916) and the Russian defeat at Gorlice-Tarnów (May to September 1915) demonstrating the Central Powers' strength, King Ferdinand signed a treaty with Germany and on 21 September 1915, Bulgaria began mobilizing for war.

After the victory of the Serbian army in the Battle of Kolubara in December 1914, the Serbian front saw a lull until the early autumn of 1915. Under the command of Field Marshal August von Mackensen, the Austro-Hungarian Balkan Army, the German 11th Army and river flotillas on the Danube and the Sava began an offensive on 6 October 1915, the largest offensive against Serbia. By September 1915, despite the extreme sacrifice of the Serbian army, the Austro-Hungarian Balkan Army, having crossed the rivers Sava and Drina and the German 11th army after crossing the Danube, occupied Belgrade, Smederevo, Požarevac and Golubac, creating a vast bridgehead south of the Sava and Danube rivers, and forcing Serbian forces to withdraw to southern Serbia. On 15 October 1915, two Bulgarian armies attacked, overrunning Serbian units, penetrating the valley of the South Morava river near Vranje up to 22 October 1915. The Bulgarian forces occupied Kumanovo, Štip, and Skopje and prevented the withdrawal of the Serbian army to the Greek border and Salonika.

The Allies had repeatedly promised to send military forces to Serbia, but nothing had materialized for a year. But with Bulgaria's mobilization to its south, the situation for Serbia became desperate. The developments finally forced the French and the British to send a small expedition force of two divisions to help Serbia. But even these arrived too late in the Greek port of Salonika to impact the operations. The main reason for the delay was the lack of available Allied forces due to the critical situation in the Western Front. The Entente used Greek neutrality as an excuse, although they could have used the Albanian coast to rapidly deploy reinforcements and equipment during the first 14 months of the war. (As the Serbian Marshal Putnik had suggested, the Montenegrin army gave adequate cover to the Albanian coast from the north—at a safe distance from any Bulgarian advance in the south in the event of a Bulgarian intervention.) The Entente was also delayed due to protracted secret negotiations to bring Bulgaria into the Allied camp, which would have alleviated Serbia's need for Franco-British help.

In the event, the lack of Allied support sealed the fate of the Serbian army. Against Serbia, the Central Powers marshalled the Bulgarian Army, a German army, and an Austro-Hungarian Army, all under the command of Field Marshal Mackensen. The Germans and Austro-Hungarians began their attack on 7 October with a massive artillery barrage, followed by attacks across the rivers. Then, on 11 October, the Bulgarian army attacked from two directions, one from the north of Bulgaria towards Niš, the other from the south towards Skopje. It rapidly broke through the weaker Serbian forces, which tried to block its advance. With the Bulgarian breakthrough, the Serbian position became hopeless; their main army in the north faced either encirclement and enforced surrender or retreat.

Marshal Putnik ordered a full Serbian retreat, southwards and westwards through Montenegro and into Albania. The Serbs faced great difficulties: terrible weather, poor roads and the need for the army to help the tens of thousands of civilians who retreated with them. Only c. 125,000 Serbian soldiers managed to reach the Adriatic coast and embark on Italian transport ships that carried the army to Corfu and other Greek islands before it travelled on to Thessaloniki. Marshal Putnik had to be carried around during the entire retreat; he died just over a year later in a French hospital.

== Battle ==
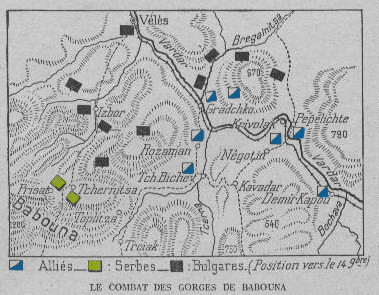
Battle of Krivolak, November 1915, showing the Allied advance northwards.

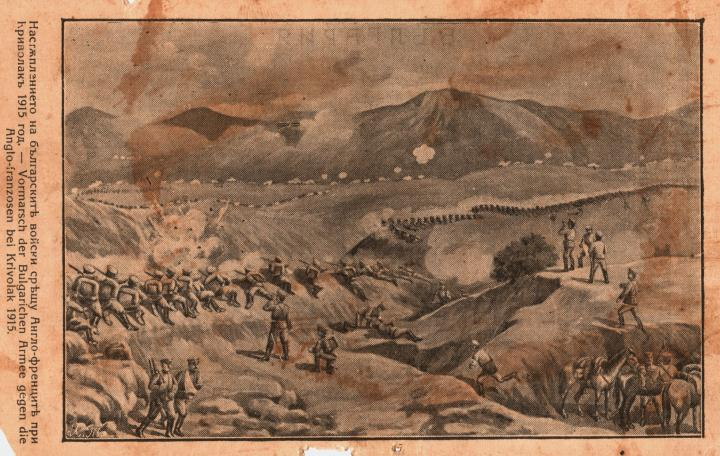
Bulgarian postcard depicting the battle.

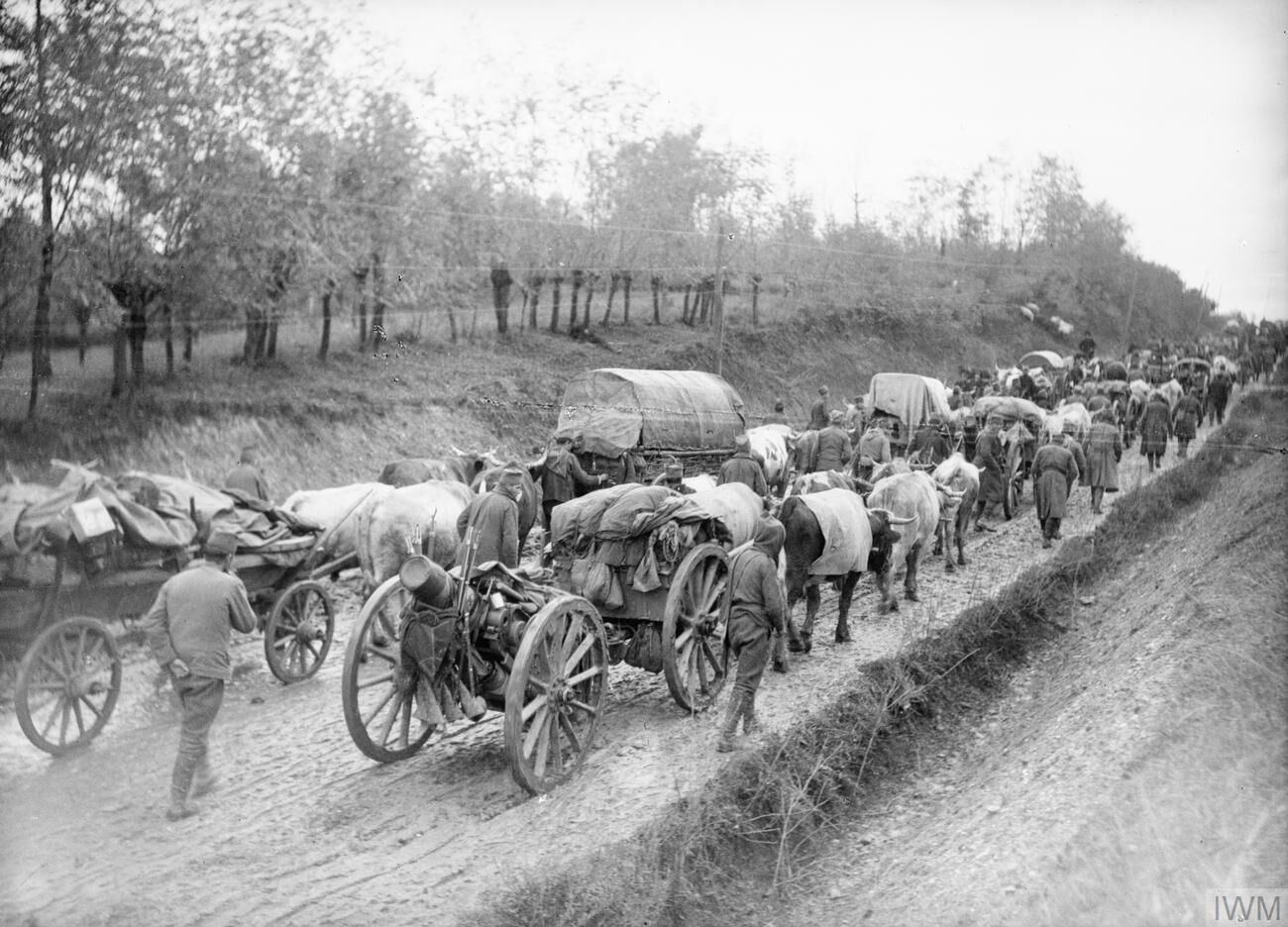
The retreat of the Serbian army at the end of October 1915.

The French and British divisions marched north from Thessaloniki in October 1915 under the joint command of the French General Maurice Sarrail and British General Bryan Mahon. From the 15–16 October, the French 57th, 122nd and 156th divisions, including two regiments of Chasseurs d'Afrique and one of Zouaves, reached the Gevgelija and Strumica rail stations. (Note: The Gevgelija and Strumica rail stations are not to be confused with the towns of Gevgelija and Strumica located elsewhere.) On 20 October, the French divisions reached Krivolak on the Vardar river, while the British occupied the strategically important area between the Kosturino Pass, Vardar and lake Doiran. This advance aided the retreating Serbian army, as the Bulgarians had to concentrate larger forces on their southern flank to deal with a possible invasion of their territory. The French command then became aware of the Bulgarian presence in the Babuna Pass between Veles and Bitola and attempted to reach a group of Serbian soldiers located northwest of the pass.

On 21 October, the 14th Bulgarian Regiment moved down from Strumica towards the Strumica rail station aiming at destroying a nearby railway bridge and unexpectedly encountered a French force. The Bulgarians were repulsed from the railway and also driven out of Rabrovo 7 miles (11 km) to the east as the French consolidated their control over 30 miles (48 km) of railway up to the Demir Kapija station. By 24 October, the 2nd Bulgarian army under Generals Georgi Todorov and Stefan Bogdanov had seized Veles and Kumanovo, cutting off the bulk of the retreating Serbs from the French. By the 27 October, the 57th Division had established a semi–circular bridgehead around Karahojali east of the Vardar, covering a 15 miles (24 km) line between Gradec and Krivolak. On 2 November, two flying bridges were thrown over the Vardar, facilitating the supply of the new positions. On 3 November, a French detachment thwarted an attempt by three Bulgarian brigades to storm the bridges. Lacking training and adequate cover, the Bulgarian infantry mowed down as they charged, resulting in 3,000 casualties. On the same day, the 156th Division captured the villages of Dorlobos and Kajali.

Finding the terrain impracticable for field artillery, the 57th and 122nd Divisions abandoned it at Karahojali, instead advancing towards Veles to strike the Bulgarian rear. On 5 November Kamen Dol, Debrista and the Gradsko rail station fell into French hands. The push ended on 7 November when the two divisions were repelled near the Monastery of Archangel, a Bulgarian stronghold. On 6 November, the 156th Division attacked Fortin Bulgare and Hill 526, south of Kosturino. The assault failed, with a Bulgarian counterattack securing Dorlobos. On 9 November, Sirkovo and Krusevica were occupied by the French. Around the same time, the Bulgarian command shifted from pursuing the retreating Serbians to combating the French forces. The 156th Division faced Mount Belasica while covering the Vardar Valley up to Gradec. Two regiments of the 57th Division held the railway from Gradec to Karahojali. The 122nd Division and two regiments of the 57th Division were in control of the territory from Gradsko station to the Vozarci bridgehead on the left bank of the Crna river, faced by six Bulgarian regiments.

On 10 November, the French charge on the Monastery of Archangel was met with an almost simultaneous Bulgarian counterattack. The monastery was held, but the French seized the nearby Dolno Cicevo and Gorno Cicevo villages, the latter on the evening of the following day. On 11 November, a second French attack on Fortin Bulgare and Hill 526 fared better, capturing the two positions and forcing the Bulgarian batteries on the Kosturino–Strumica road to fall back. On the night of 11 November, General Charles de Lardemelle commanding the 122nd Division evacuated the two Cicevos. On the morning of 12 November, General Stefan Bogdanov ordered an offensive on Mrzen, Gradsko and the two Cicevos, believing that they were still occupied by the Allies, by the afternoon Krusevica and Grasko had been conquered by the Bulgarians. To the west, the French reached the outskirts of Ormanli and Kosturino, halting after receiving news of Bulgarian reinforcements at Mount Belasica. On 13 November, a renewed Bulgarian attack made limited gains on both flanks of the front. The French government then ordered General Sarrail to halt all operations and fall back to Bitola, due to the hostility of some Greek officials, which dangerously exposed the French rear to a potential Greek attack.

The front remained quiet until 20 November, when the 5th Bulgarian Division moved down the Prilep–Vozarci road, capturing the Vozarci bridgehead. On 22 November, two Serbian divisions launched an abortive assault on Skopje, and the Serbian defeat removed the need for further Entente offensives in Vardar Macedonia, enabling the French to evacuate their forces from the region. The battle resulted in 5,877 Bulgarians killed, wounded or missing. French losses amounted to 3,161 killed, wounded or missing.

== Aftermath ==
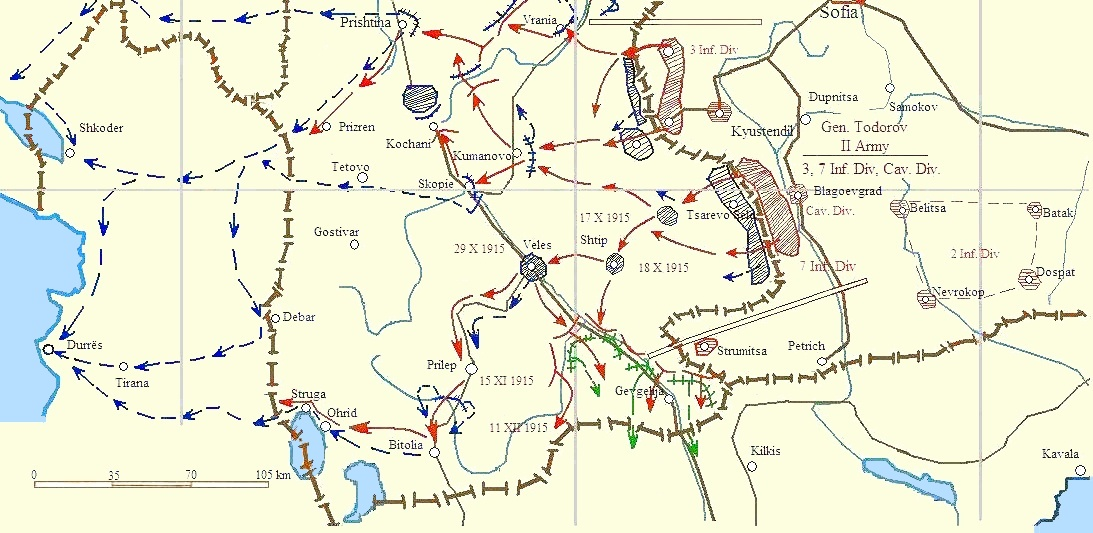
Operations of the Second Bulgarian Army in 1915.

The British had, in the meantime, only encountered small bands of Bulgarian deserters, who informed them that the 2nd Bulgarian Army under General Georgi Todorov had been reinforced at Strumica. On 26 November, the French forces that were previously in touch with the British at the Kajali ravine began their evacuation, dangerously exposing the left flank of the 10th (Irish) Division. Expecting Greece to remain inert, Bulgaria was now able to launch a fresh offensive with its 120 battalions against the 50 that the Allies had at their disposal. On the morning of the 4 December, the Bulgarians built trestle bridges across the Crna river and rapidly occupied Bitola.

On 4 December, Bulgaria commenced an artillery barrage on British positions along the Kosturino ridge. The artillery preparation continued until 6 December, when it was augmented. The bombardment reached its peak at 2:30 p.m., while concentrating on the Rocky Peak position south of Ormanli, which was held by the Connaught Rangers. Half an hour later, small bands of Bulgarian troops began the Battle of Kosturino when they attempted to make their way down the ridge, in front of the British trench, before being stopped at 60 yards (55 m) from the wire. The Bulgarians briefly overran Rocky Peak before the Royal Irish Fusiliers drove them back in hand-to-hand fighting. At dusk, the Rocky Peak was reinforced by half a company and a machine gun. The 6th Royal Dublin Fusiliers were transferred to Kajali, with three more companies heading towards Hasanli.

At 1:00 p.m. on 11 December, the 11th Bulgarian Division seized Bogdanci, cutting the local telephone line and capturing an ammunition depot. The Allies had selected the Doiran train station as their new objective in preparation for a complete evacuation toward Salonika. The 9th battalion King's Own Royal Regiment remained isolated from the rest of the Allies, only beginning its withdrawal at 12:45 a.m. on 12 December. An hour later, the battalion encountered a battalion of soldiers resting by the roadside, belatedly realizing that they were Bulgarians. The resulting bayonet charge led to the death or capture of 122 British soldiers. By evening, the evacuation of the Entente troops into Greece was complete, with the 10th Irish and the 57th, 122nd and 156th French divisions crossing the border. Greek border guards assured the Allies they would oppose any Bulgarian attempt to cross. An Allied spy later confirmed that Bulgaria had no intention of breaching the border, halting 1.2 miles (2 km) short instead.

=== Analysis ===
The battle was a clear, albeit incomplete, victory for the Central Powers. This resulted in them opening the railway line from Berlin to Constantinople, allowing Germany to prop up its weaker partner, the Ottoman Empire. Despite the Central Powers' victory, the Allies managed to save a part of the Serbian army, which, although battered, seriously reduced and almost unarmed, escaped destruction and, after reorganizing, resumed operations six months later. The Allies (using the moral excuse of saving the Serbian army) managed to replace the impossible Serbian front with a viable one established in Macedonia (albeit by violating the territory of Greece, a neutral country), which would prove key to their final victory three years later. The Allies were able to concentrate on fortifying the so-called Entrenched Camp in preparation for a large-scale Bulgarian invasion of Greece and an impending assault on Salonika.

=== Casualties ===
The battle at Kosturino and the subsequent evacuation of the Allies resulted in 1,209 British casualties, including 99 killed, 386 wounded, 724 missing, and ten artillery pieces. French casualties amounted to 1,804 killed, wounded or missing, along with 12 machine guns and 36 ammunition wagons. The number of Bulgarian losses during the battle is estimated to be greater than that of the Allies, with at least 400 falling dead on 9 December.

=== Subsequent operations ===
Following the failure of the August Offensive at the Dardanelles, the Gallipoli Campaign drifted into a stalemate. Ottoman success began to affect public opinion in the United Kingdom, with news discrediting Ian Standish Monteith Hamilton's performance being smuggled out by journalists like Keith Murdoch and Ellis Ashmead-Bartlett. General Stopford also contributed to the overall gloom. The prospect of evacuation was raised on 11 October 1915, but Hamilton resisted the suggestion, fearing damage to British prestige. He was dismissed as commander shortly afterwards and replaced by Lieutenant General Sir Charles Monro. Autumn and winter brought relief from the heat but also led to gales, blizzards and flooding, resulting in men drowning and freezing to death, while thousands suffered frostbite. After consulting with the commanders of VIII Corps at Helles, IX Corps at Suvla, and Anzac, Sir Herbert Kitchener agreed with Monro and the British Cabinet in early December, confirmed the decision to evacuate.

Suvla and Anzac were to be evacuated in late December, the last troops leaving before dawn on 20 December. Troop numbers had been slowly reduced since the 7 December, and ruses, such as William Scurry's self-firing rifle, rigged to fire by water dripped into a pan attached to the trigger, were used to disguise the Allied departure. At Anzac Cove, troops maintained silence for an hour or more until curious Ottoman troops ventured to inspect the trenches, where the Anzacs opened fire. The final British troops departed from Lancashire Landing around 04:00 on 8 January 1916. The Newfoundland Regiment was chosen to be a part of the rearguard, finally withdrawing from Gallipoli on 9 January 1916.

== See also ==
- Kingdom of Yugoslavia

== Sources ==
- Albertini, Luigi (1953). Origins of the War of 1914. Vol. II. Oxford: Oxford University Press. OCLC 168712.
- Bernede, Alain (1998). "The Gardeners of Salonika: The Lines of Communication and the Logistics of the French Army of the East, October 1915–November 1918". War & Society. 16 (1): 43–59. doi:10.1179/072924798791201129.
- Broadbent, Harvey (2005). Gallipoli: The Fatal Shore. Camberwell, Victoria: Viking/Penguin. ISBN 978-0-670-04085-8.
- Carlyon, Les (2001). Gallipoli. Sydney: Pan Macmillan. ISBN 978-0-7329-1089-1.
- DiNardo, Richard L. (2015). Invasion: The Conquest of Serbia, 1915. Santa Barbara: Praeger. ISBN 9781440800924.
- Falls, C. (1996) [1933]. Military Operations Macedonia: From the Outbreak of War to the Spring of 1917. History of the Great War Based on Official Documents by Direction of the Historical Section of the Committee of Imperial Defence. Vol. I (Imperial War Museum and Battery Press ed.). London: HMSO. ISBN 978-0-89839-242-5.
- Fischer, Fritz (1967). Germany's Aims in the First World War. New York: W. W. Norton. ISBN 978-0-393-09798-6.
- Gordon-Smith, Gordon (1920). From Serbia to Yugoslavia Serbia's Victories, Reverses and Final Triumph, 1914–1918. New York: G.P. Putnam's Sons. ISBN 978-5519466608.
- Nicholson, Gerald W. L. (2007). The Fighting Newfoundlander. Carleton Library Series. Vol. 209. McGill-Queen's University Press. ISBN 978-0-7735-3206-9.
- Korsun, Nikolay (1939). Балканский фронт мировой войны 1914–1918 гг [Balkan Front of the World War 1914–1918] (in Russian). Moscow: Boenizdat. OCLC 7970969.
- Travers, Tim (2001). Gallipoli 1915. Stroud: Tempus. ISBN 978-0-7524-2551-1.
- Villari, Luigi (1922). The Macedonian Campaign. London: T. Fisher Unwin. OCLC 6388448.
- Wahlert, Glenn (2008). Exploring Gallipoli: An Australian Army Battlefield Guide. Australian Army Campaign Series. Vol. 4. Canberra: Army History Unit. ISBN 978-0-9804753-5-7.
- Willmott, H. P. (2003). World War I. New York: Dorling Kindersley. ISBN 978-0-7894-9627-0. OCLC 52541937.
