= Prosenikovo =

Village in North Macedonia

Prosenikovo Просениково
- Village
- Location within North Macedonia
- Coordinates: 41.459317°N 22.682275°E
- Country: North Macedonia
- Region: Southeastern
- Municipality: Strumica

Population (2021)
  - Total: 1,223
- Time zone: UTC+1 (CET)
  - Summer (DST): UTC+2 (CEST)
- Website: .

Prosenikovo (Macedonian: Просениково) is a village in the municipality of Strumica, North Macedonia.

== Demographics ==
According to the 2002 census, the village had a total of 1,550 inhabitants. Ethnic groups in the village include:

- Macedonians 1,543
- Serbs 5
- Others 2

As of 2021, the village of Prosenikovo has 1.223 inhabitants and the ethnic composition was the following:

- Macedonians – 1.104

Albanians – 1

- Serbs – 2
- others – 12
- Person without Data - 104
