= Memešli =

Memešli Мемешли
- Village
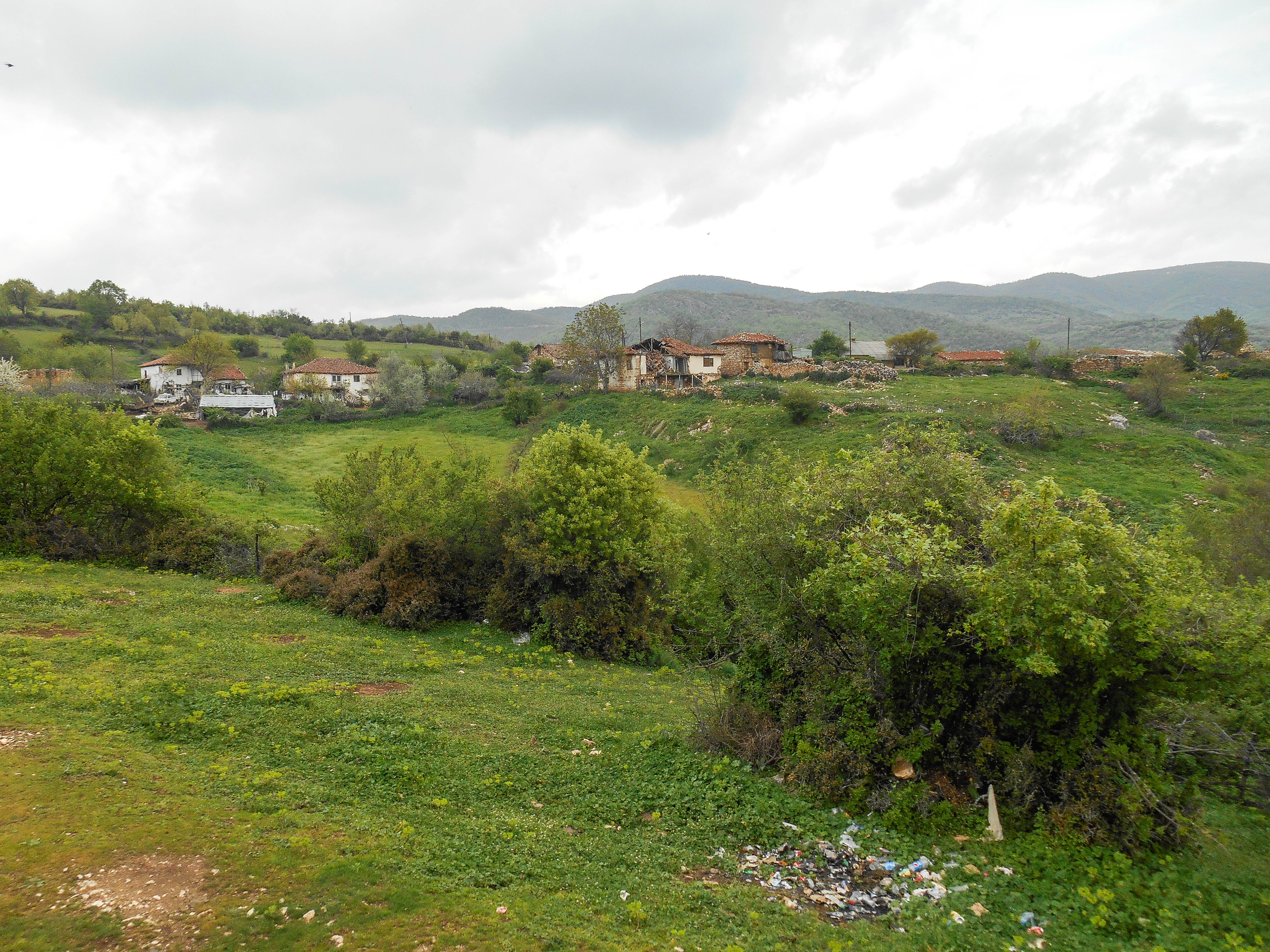

- Location within North Macedonia
- Country: North Macedonia
- Region: Southeastern
- Municipality: Strumica

Population (2021)
  - Total: 16
- Time zone: UTC+1 (CET)
  - Summer (DST): UTC+2 (CEST)
- Website: .

Memešli (Macedonian: Мемешли) is a village in the municipality of Strumica, North Macedonia.

== Demographics ==
According to a German map issued in 1941, based on the 1931 census, the village had 550 Turks.

According to the 2002 census, the village had a total of 44 inhabitants.

According to the 2021 census, the village had a total of 16 inhabitants, 15 in whom were Turks.
