= Kukliš =

Village near Strumica, North Macedonia

Kukliš Куклиш
- Village
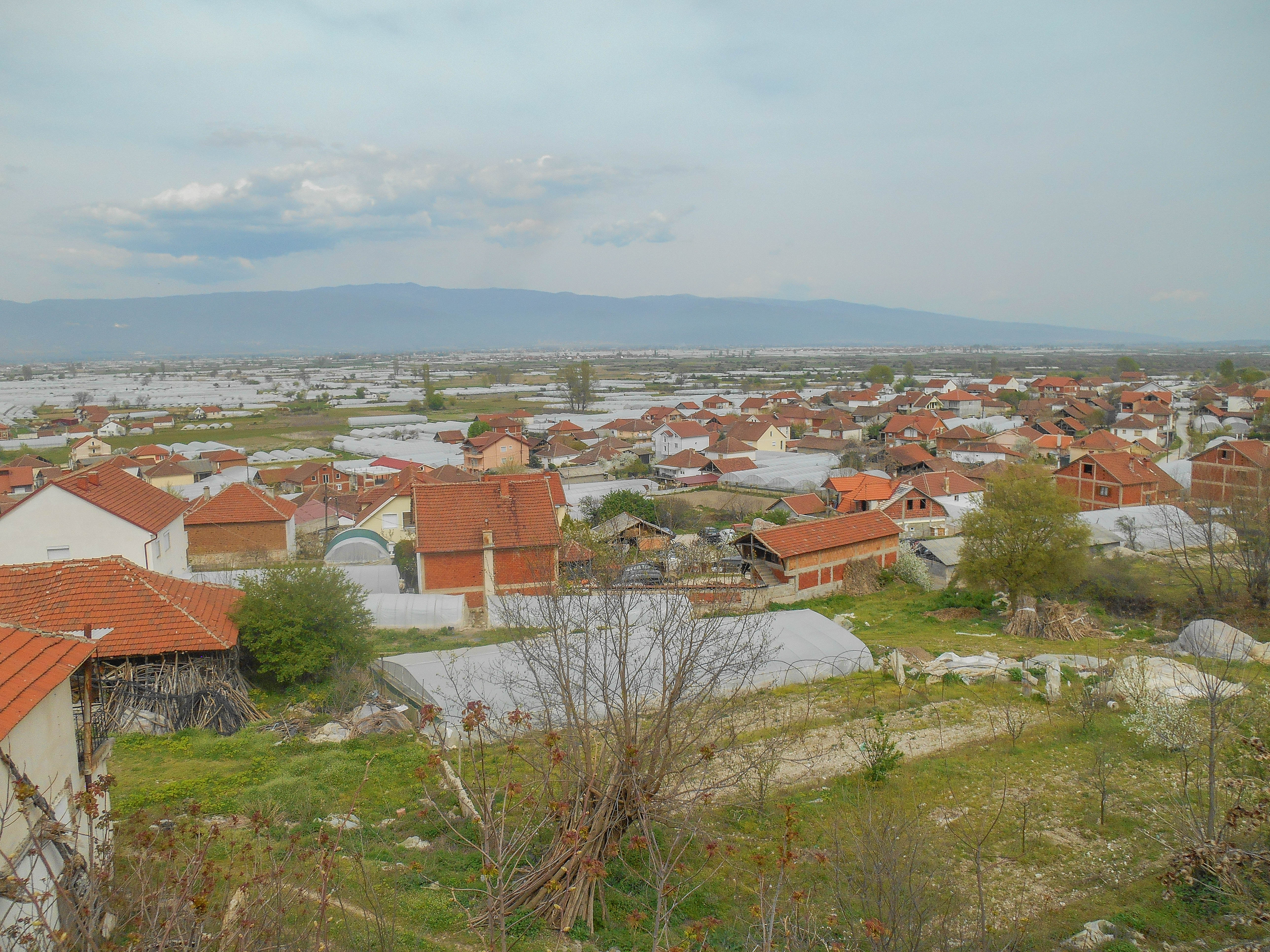
- View of the village

- Location within North Macedonia
- Coordinates: 41°24′N 22°40′E
- Country: North Macedonia
- Region: Southeastern
- Municipality: Strumica
- Elevation: 235 m (771 ft)

Population (2021)
  - Total: 2,172
- Time zone: UTC+1 (CET)
  - Summer (DST): UTC+2 (CEST)

Kukliš (Macedonian: Куклиш) is a village in Strumica Municipality, North Macedonia, on the northern foothills of Belasica in the Podgorje oblast. It was the seat of the former Kukliš Municipality. As of 2021, Kukliš has a population of 2,172.

== Etymology ==
The name Куклиш comes from the Slavic word кукла, meaning "doll".

== History ==
According to Ethnographie des vilayets d'Andrinople: de Monastir, et de Salonique, which was published in 1878, the village had 100 houses and a population of 306 males, all of whom were recorded as Bulgarians. (Note: In the 19th century, the Slavs of Macedonia were generally referred to by outsiders and by themselves as "Bulgarians". A distinct Macedonian national identity developed mainly during the 20th century and is the majority identity in today’s Republic of North Macedonia. See Modern Greece: A History since 1821 by John S. Koliopoulos, Thanos M. Veris. p. 48.)

In the 1880s and 1890s, villagers from Kukliš left the Ecumenical Patriarchate of Constantinople to join the Bulgarian Exarchate. As a result, the main Kukliš church, built in 1862, also became part of the Exarchate.

An illegal route connecting Drvoš, Dabilja, Sačevo, and Kosturino passed through the village and was used to transport chetas, insurgents, weapons, ammunition, and mail.

In 1900, according to statistics collected by Vasil Kanchov in Macedonia. Ethnography and Statistics, the village had a population of 700, all of whom were recorded as Bulgarians.

In 1905, according to statistics collected by Dimitar Mishev in La Macédoine et sa Population Chrétienne, the village had a population of 904, all recorded as Bulgarians and Exarchists.

There was a local IMRO committee in the village founded by Hristo Chernopeev and Mihail Dumbalakov in 1909.

=== 1905 attack on Kukliš ===
On 3 February 1905, Ottoman forces discovered that Krastyo Georgiev Novoselski and his cheta of 15 men were in the village, likely due to betrayal. Ottoman troops and about 150 bashi-bazouks engaged in battle with them, after which the cheta managed to escape. The Ottomans then looted the village and set it on fire. 64 of the 105 houses in the village were burned, and the local church and school were also looted and burned.

=== 1912 attack on Kukliš ===
In October 1912 during the First Balkan War, as Serbian and Bulgarian forces were approaching Strumica, local chetas aided them. The Ottomans, in retaliation for the actions of the chetas, bombarded Kukliš with cannons and set the village on fire, with 20 peasant casualties overall.

=== Kukliš during World War II ===
Kukliš had its first National Liberation Committee in March 1944, as well as the first one in the Strumica region.

== Geography ==
Kukliš is located in the southwestern part of the Strumica valley, on the northern foothills of Belasica in Podgorje in the vicinity of Srpska Reka, 4 km (2.5 mi) away from Strumica. The village sits on a plain at an elevation of 235 m (771 ft) above sea level. The surrounding fields have mostly alluvial and clayey–sandy soils. There are also nuclear raw materials in its area, including uranium oxide.

== Demographics ==
The population of Kukliš from the 1948 census to the 2021 census is as follows: (Note: In the 2021 census, there are 93 "persons for whom the data has been obtained from administrative sources".)

Population by census year
Year	Population	Macedonians	Serbs	Albanians	Others
1948	1,317	—	—	—	—
1953	1,442	1,440	0	0	2
1961	1,786	1,781	4	0	1
1971	2,057	2,053	4	0	0
1981	2,382	2,373	7	0	2
1991	2,555	2,546	7	0	2
1994	2,517	2,515	2	0	0
2002	2,532	2,529	2	0	1
2021	2,172	2,074	—	2	

== Administrative status ==
On 22 September 1996, Kukliš Municipality was officially established. However, the municipality was later merged into Strumica Municipality on 17 August 2004.
