= Dabilje =

Dabilje Дабиље
- Village
- Location within North Macedonia
- Coordinates: 41.443261°N 22.690595°E
- Country: North Macedonia
- Region: Southeastern
- Municipality: Strumica

Population (2002)
  - Total: 1,946
- Time zone: UTC+1 (CET)
  - Summer (DST): UTC+2 (CEST)
- Website: .

Dabilje (Macedonian: Дабиље) is a village in the municipality of Strumica, North Macedonia.

== Demographics ==
According to the 2002 census, the village had a total of 1,946 inhabitants. Ethnic groups in the village include:

- Macedonians 1,940
- Serbs 5
- Others 1
