= Charles de Lardemelle =

French general (1867–1935)

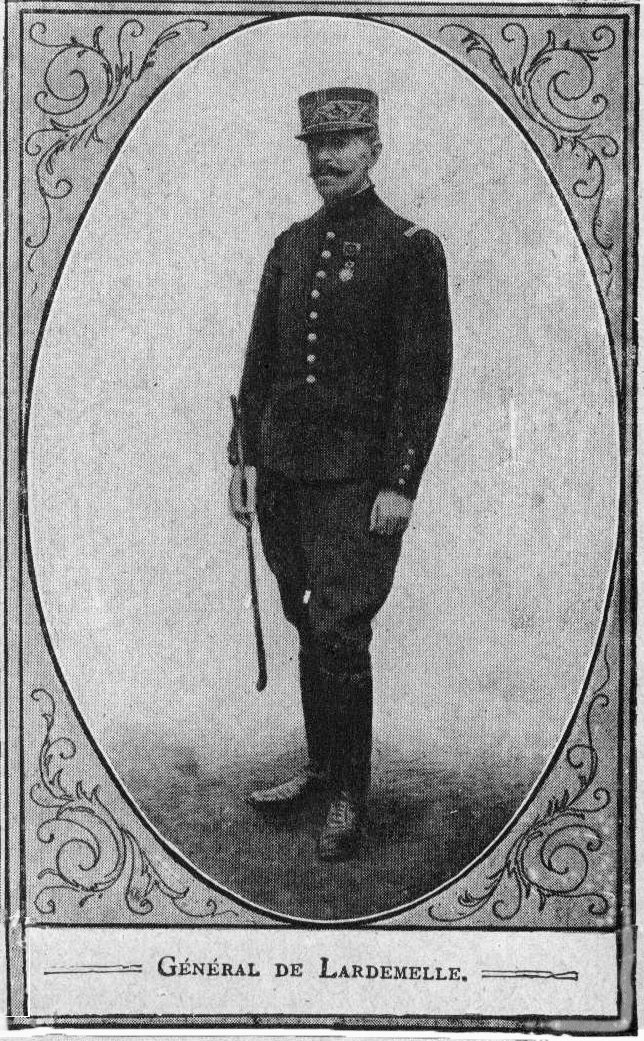
- Born: 5 May 1867; Metz, Moselle, French Empire
- Died: 28 December 1935 (aged 68); Paris, French Republic
- Military career
- Allegiance: France
- Branch: French Army
- Service years: 1885 – 1929
- Rank: Division General
- Commands: 122nd Infantry Division; 74th Reserve Infantry Division; 41st Infantry Division; 6th Corps
- Conflicts: Boxer Rebellion: Battle of Peking; World War I: Battle of Krivolak

Charles de Lardemelle (5 May 1867 – 28 December 1935) was a French general who participated in the First World War.

== Biography ==
Coming from a family of career soldiers, Charles Marie de Lardemelle was born in Metz on 5 May 1867. He is the son of Louis Marie de Lardemelle and Anne de Turmel, nephew of General Georges de Lardemelle. His family having opted for French nationality after the annexation of Alsace-Lorraine, he studied in Nancy then in Saint-Cyr. Assigned as a second lieutenant in Verdun in 1887, he prepared for the École militaire and was promoted to captain in 1896. He became the officer order of General Félix Jean-Marie Hervé who was commander of the 6th army corps.

In 1900, Lardemelle was assigned to the staff of the French Indochina troops. He then participated in the Boxer Rebellion and participated in the Battle of Peking. Back in France, he continued his career in various garrisons. In 1913, he was appointed Chief of Staff of the 1st Corps in Lille.

== World War I ==
During the First World War, Lardemelle participated in World War I, before taking the Head of Staff of the 5th Army. He became a brigadier general in 1915 and took command of the 122nd Infantry Division in the Balkans. On 20 November 1915 he retired from the Cerna loop and was replaced by General Gérôme. Back in France the following year, he took command of the 74th Division. He then participated in various operations in Châlons-en-Champagne and in the Meuse, until victory.

Major General Lardemelle took command of the 7th District in Besançon at 1919. In 1922, he became governor of Metz, a post he kept until 1929. He died in Paris on 28 December 1935.

== Awards ==
- Legion of Honour, Knight on 11 July 1901, Officer on 10 April 1915, Commander on 16 June 1920 and Grand Officer on 11 July 1928.
- 1901 China expedition commemorative medal (April 1902)
- Croix de guerre 1914–1918
- Inter-allied Victory Medal
- 1914–1918 Commemorative war medal

=== Foreign Awards ===
- Belgium: Croix de guerre
- Empire of Japan: Order of the Rising Sun (August 1900)
- Russian Empire: Order of Saint Anna (January 1903)
- Spain: Cross of Military Merit
- Tunisia: Order of Glory (December 1902)

== Bibliography ==
- Pierre Brasme (2008). Éditions Pierron (ed.). Charles de Lardemelle (1867-1935): the last of the great generals of Metz (in French). Paris. p. 266. ISBN 978-2-7085-0348-9..
- Émile Reibell; Gaston Billotte; Charles Eugène Charet (1936). Berger-Levrault (ed.). General de Lardemelle (1867-1935). p. 29..
