= Cheta (armed group) =

Armed Anti-Ottoman band in Ottoman Empire

A cheta (Albanian: çeta; Aromanian: ceatã; Bulgarian: чета; Greek: τσέτης; Macedonian: чета; Romanian: ceată; Turkish: çete; Serbian: чета, romanized: četa), in plural chetas, were irregular armed bands present throughout the 19th-century and very early 20th-century Ottoman Empire, particularly in Anatolia and the Balkans.

== Context and terminology ==
In the late Ottoman Empire, armed rebellions became common occurrences. These rebellions often saw irregular armed bands of rebels, known as chetas, take on the Ottoman Army. Cheta (četa) is a Slavic word meaning 'troop', with a proto-Slavic origin; cognate words exist in most Slavic languages. The term was also used as a synonym for members of the Special Organization in the Ottoman empire.

The leader of Slavic chetas were generally referred to as a voivoda. Leaders of Greek chetas referred to them as the kapetan or kapetanios. The members of chetas were generally called 'chetniks', though members of Bulgarian chetas were known as Komitadjis, while members of Greek chetas have been referred to as Armatoles, Klepht, Andartes, or Makedonomachoi (in the period of the Macedonian Struggle)

== Notable occurrences ==
During the Macedonian Struggle of 1893 to 1912 chetas of Bulgarians, Greeks, Serbs, Aromanians and Albanians fought against each other and against the Ottoman Army, vying for ideological and ethnic dominance in the territory. This was during a time when increasingly harsh Ottoman crackdowns indicated that reform and reconciliation of the Ottoman state with the various nationalist groups seemed increasingly less likely.

Muslim chetas were active in Asia Minor after World War I. They were notorious for their assaults on Christian Orthodox Armenians, Greeks, and Assyrians during the late Ottoman genocides of c. 1913 to c. 1924. The term was also used as a synonym for members of the Ottoman Empire's Special Organization (active c. 1913 to 1920).

== Gallery ==
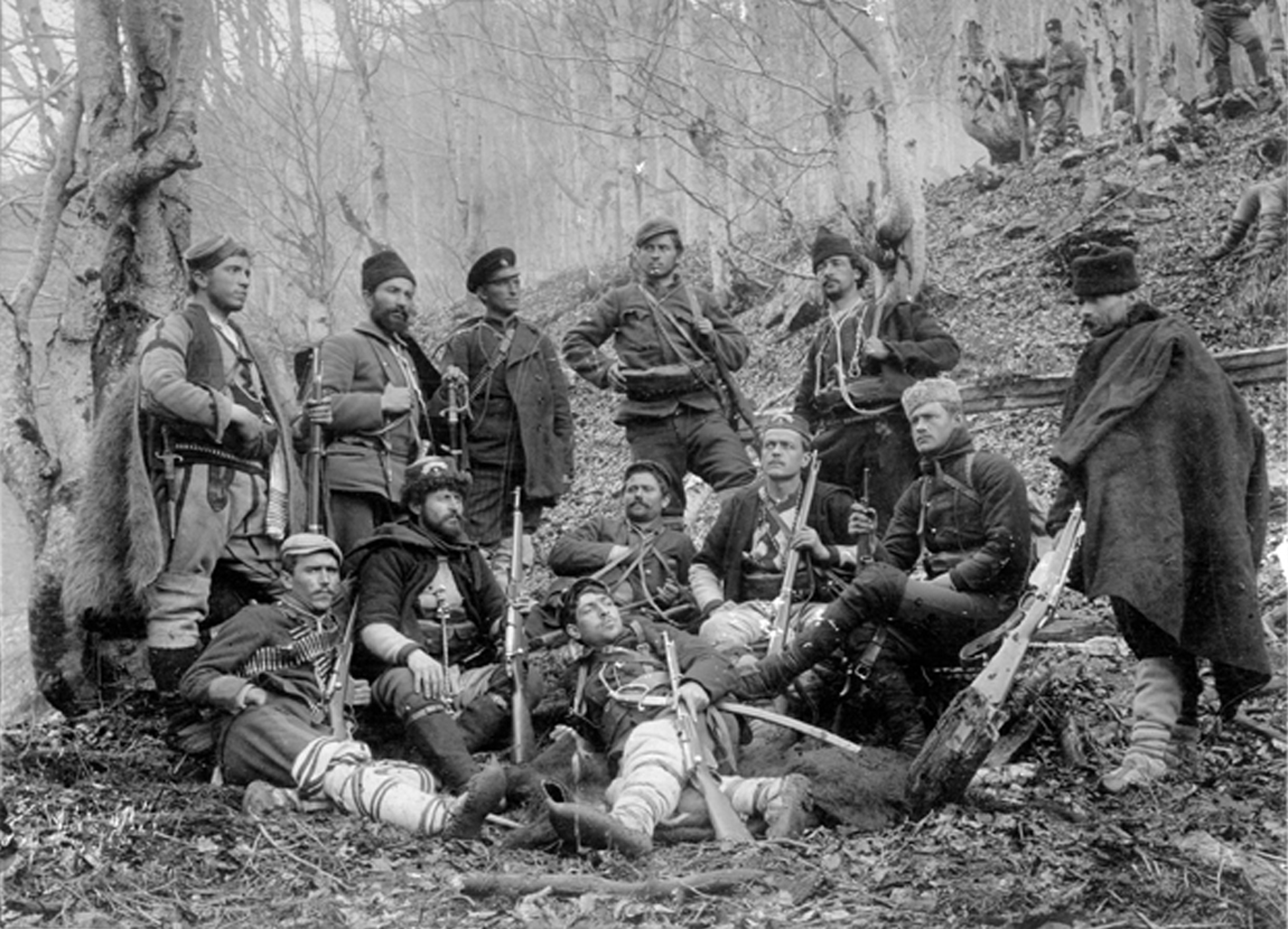
Internal Macedonian-Adrianople Revolutionary Organization cheta in Osogovo (March 1903).

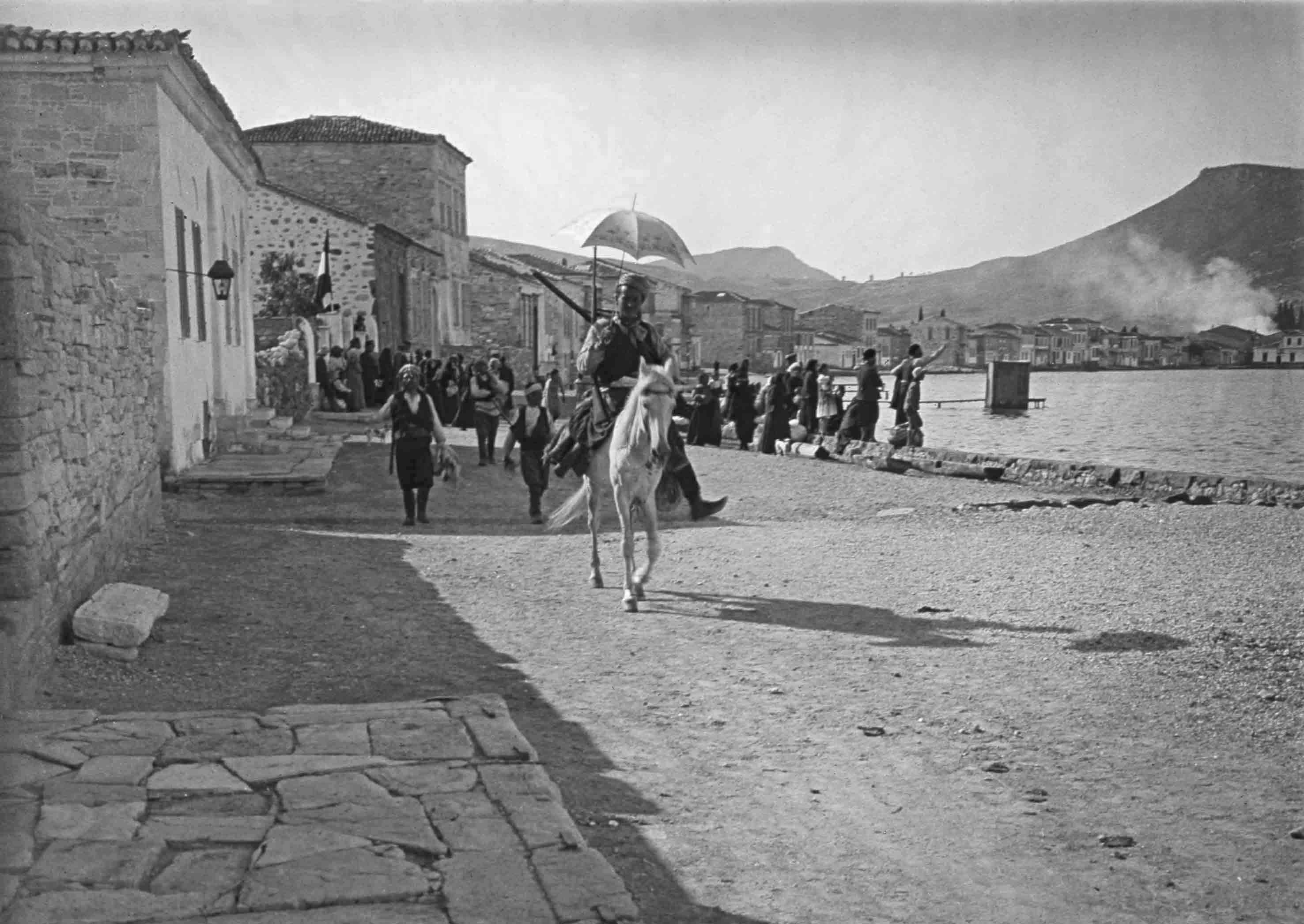
Çetes parading with loot in Phocaea (modern-day Foça, Turkey) on 13 June 1914. In the background are Greek refugees and burning buildings.

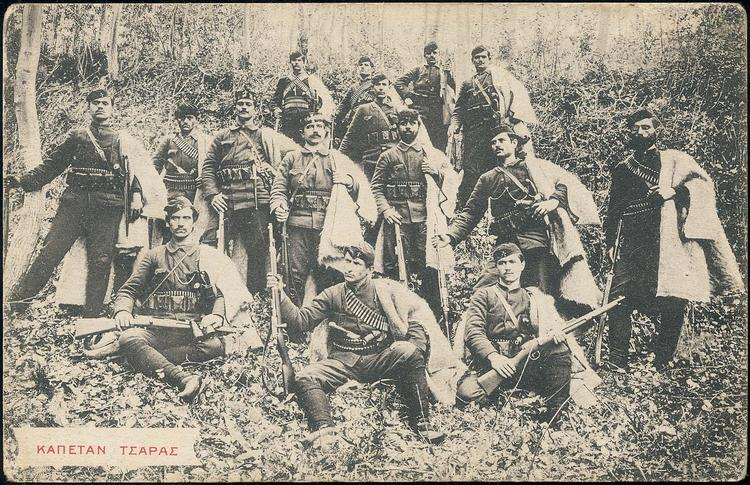
Kapetan Tzaras and his cheta during the Macedonian Struggle

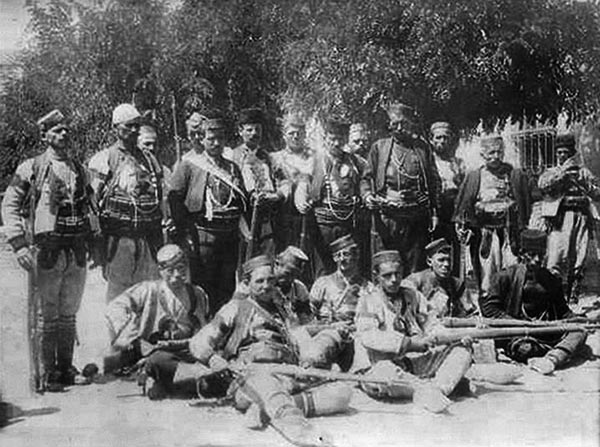
Serb chetniks in 1908

== See also ==
- Albanian revolutionary organizations
- Armenian fedayi
- Bashi-bazouk
- Hajduk
- Kachaks
- Kuva-yi Milliye
- Serbian Chetnik Organization
- Serbian nationalism
- Supreme Macedonian-Adrianople Committee
- Zeybeks
