= Kosturino, North Macedonia =

Kosturino Костурино
- Village
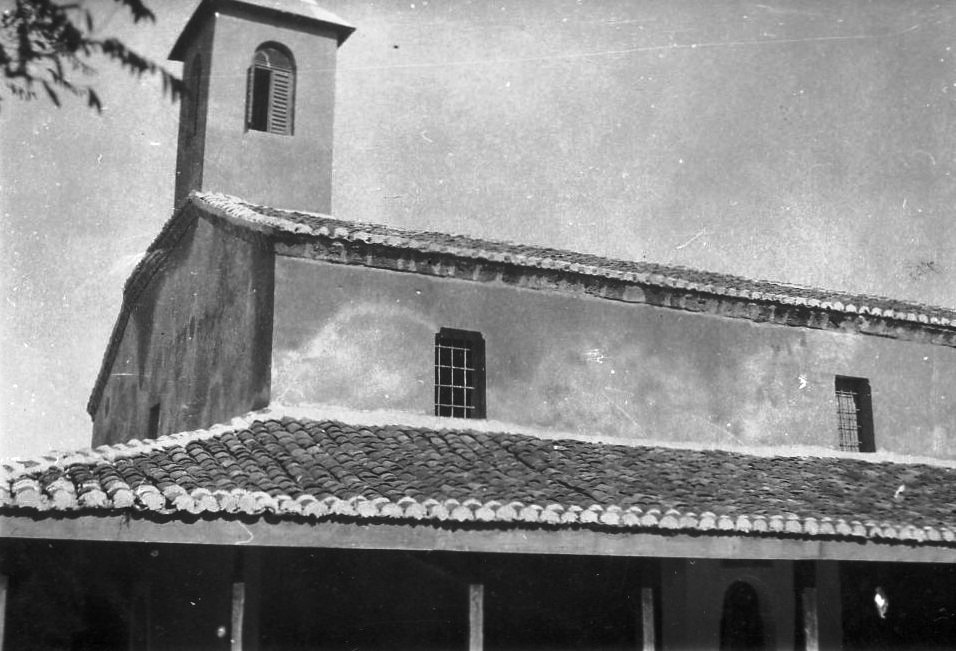
- St. Demetrious Church in the village Kosturino, Kingdom of Yugoslavia, 1931

- Location within North Macedonia
- Coordinates: 41°21′26″N 22°36′34″E
- Country: North Macedonia
- Region: Southeastern
- Municipality: Strumica
- Elevation: 506 m (1,660 ft)

Population (2002)
  - Total: 1,280
- Time zone: UTC+1 (CET)
  - Summer (DST): UTC+2 (CEST)
- Website: www.strumica.gov.mk

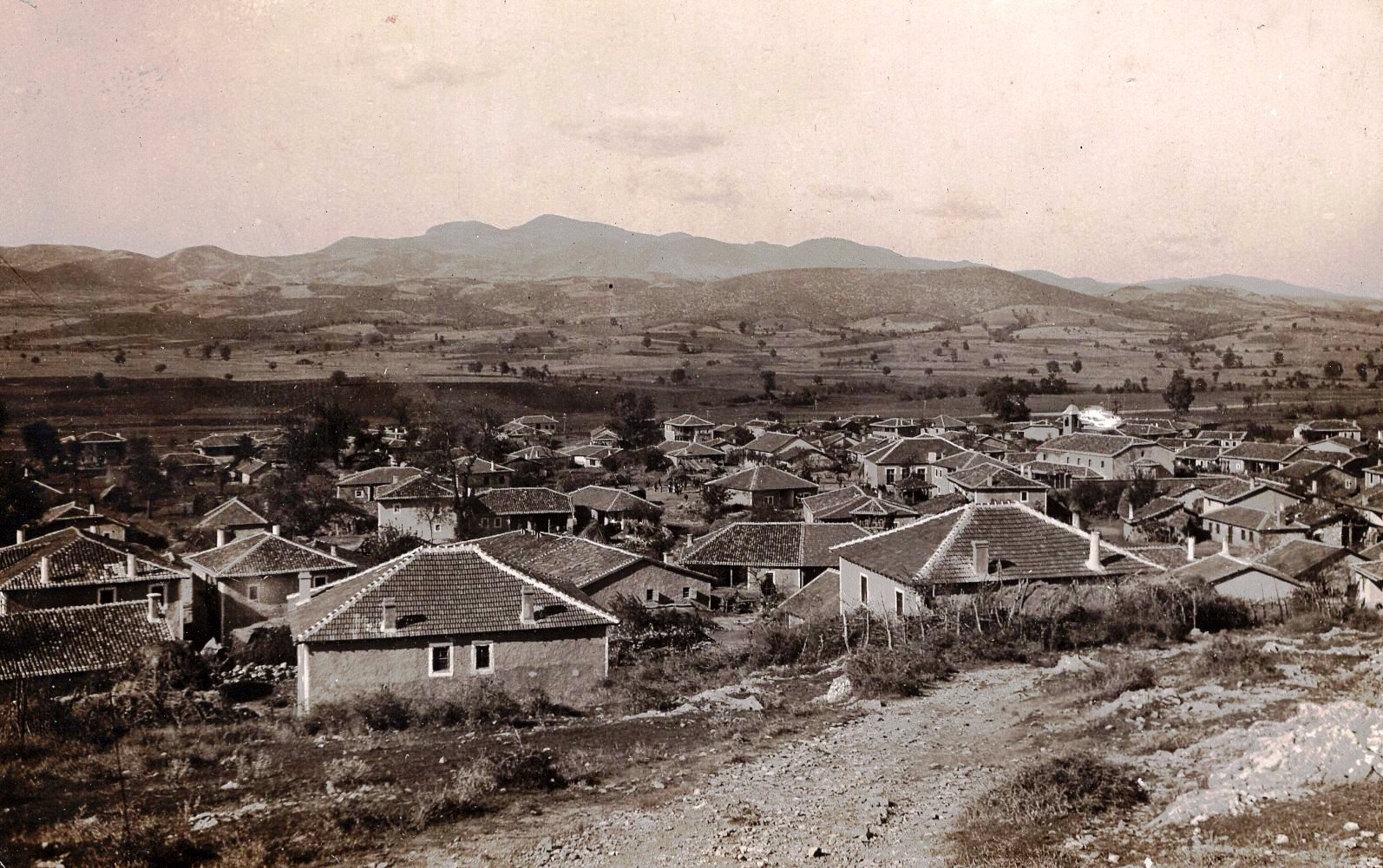
Village Kosturino, Kingdom of Yugoslavia, 1931

Kosturino (in Macedonian Костурино) is a village in the municipality of Strumica, North Macedonia. It used to be part of the former municipality of Kukliš.

The village and the mountains around it were the scene of the Battle of Kosturino between Bulgarians and a combined force of British and French troops in December 1915.

== Demographics ==
According to the 2002 census, the village had a total of 1,280 inhabitants. Ethnic groups in the village include:

- Macedonians 1,276
- Turks 1
- Serbs 2
- Others 1

As of 2021, the village of Kosturino has 895 inhabitants and the ethnic composition was the following:

- Macedonians – 803
- Albanians – 4
- Serbs – 2
- others – 3
- Person without Data - 83
