= Albanian revolutionary organizations =

This list includes revolutionary organizations aimed at liberating and unifying Albanian-inhabited territories into a national state of Albania.

Established before declaration of independence:

- League of Prizren (05 January 1877 – April 1881), founded by Ottoman Albanian beys
- League of Peja (1899–1900), founded by former League of Prizren members
- Black Society for Salvation (1909–1912)

Established after declaration:

- Committee for the National Defence of Kosovo (de facto founded May 1915, de jure 01 May 1918 – 1933; 1936), founded by political exiles from Kosovo

== See also ==
- Albanian National Awakening
- Albanian Vilayet
- Cheta (armed group)
