= Frédéric Sorrieu =

French painter

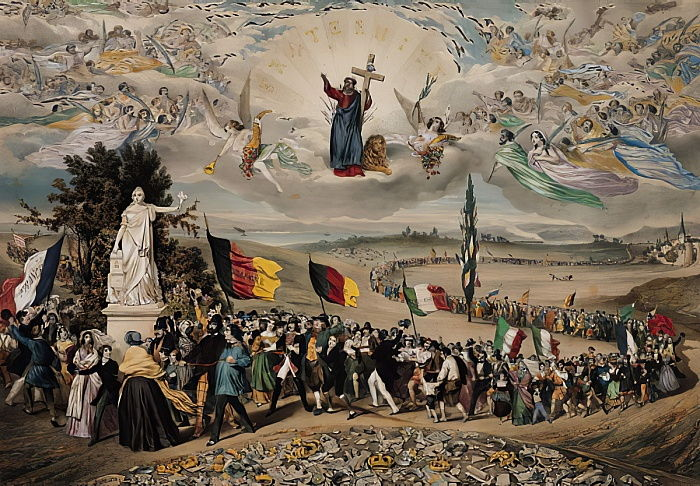
- La République universelle démocratique et sociale – The Pact between nations, a print prepared by Frédéric Sorrieu in 1848. It depicts Sorrieu's utopian vision of democratic national states.
- Born: 17 January 1807; Paris, France
- Died: 25 September 1887 (aged 80); Seine-Port, France
- Works: La République universelle démocratique et sociale Le Suffrage universel dédié à Ledru-Rollin
- Movement: Nationalism in France; Universal male suffrage

Frédéric Sorrieu (French: [fʁedeʁik sɔʁjø]; 17 January 1807 – 26 September 1887) was a French engraver, printmaker, and draughtsman. He was notable for his works testifying the liberal and nationalist revolutions in France and in Europe. One of his works, La République universelle démocratique et sociale, depicts Sorrieu's utopian vision of democratic national states.

== Works ==
=== La République universelle démocratique et sociale ===
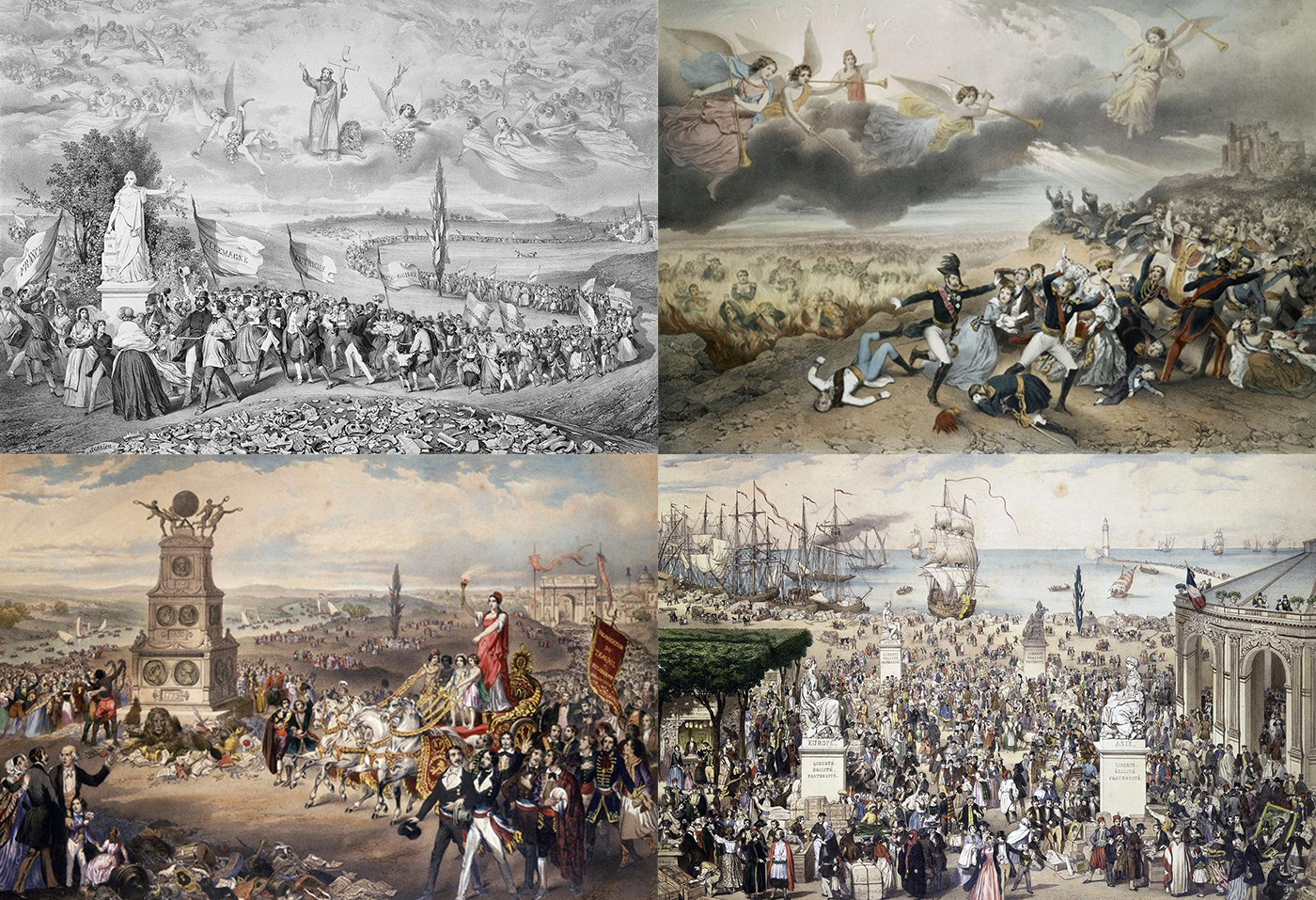
La République universelle démocratique et sociale, painted by Frédéric Sorrieu in 1848. Top left: Le Pacte, Top right: Le Prologue, Bottom left: Le Triomphe, Bottom right: Le Marché

La République universelle démocratique et sociale (The universal democratic and social republic) was a series of four gouache lithographs presenting forty-eight utopias and Sorrieu's utopian vision.

Le Pacte illustrates the nationalist dimension of the spring of the people: a procession of European nations (in which people of all sexes, ages and social classes mingle) marches past a tree of freedom, then a statue of the allegory of the Republic. Nations are identifiable by their flags (French, German, Italian, Hungarian ) and their traditional costumes. In 17th century The decay of monarchs is symbolized by a soil littered with royal attributes. From the heavens above, Christ, saints and angels gaze upon the scene. They have been used by the artist to symbolise fraternity among the nations of the world.

This theme is repeated in Le Prologue : Sorrieu represents the divine power (angels surrounding a deified Republic) dispersing the mad rulers, called to join their predecessors and condemned to burn in the flames of hell (where we already recognize Louis XVI, Marie Antoinette, and Napoleon). A castle in ruins in the background symbolizes the collapse of the feudal system.

Le Triomphe represents the République universelle (universal republic) as a living goddess carried by a rich quadriga whose reins are entrusted to children from four continents. The quadriga was from Paris symbolized by some monuments (Arc de Triomphe, Assembly, column of the Bastille and Panthéon) that comes along with a procession, which goes to an imaginary monument celebrating the three French revolutions. At his feet, a slave freed from his chains represents the abolition of slavery, while a lion, symbol of the strength of the sovereign people, crushes military rags and manifests peace.

Finally, Le Marché represents the utopia of the abolition of all customs barriers. This image is surprising in two ways: by its archaic side - the market is represented as a caravanserai, boats dock banks without docks or pontoons (which is impossible) - and the free-trade idea that he defends, a very minor idea in France as in Europe of 1848.

=== Le Suffrage universel dédié à Ledru-Rollin ===
Suffrage universel dédié à Ledru-Rollin (first image) was lithography which pays tribute to French statesman Alexandre Auguste Ledru-Rollin for establishing universal male suffrage in France in 1848, following the French Revolution of 1848.
