= Strumica Municipality =

Municipality of North Macedonia

Coordinates: 41.43°N 22.66°E

Municipality of Strumica Општина Струмица
- Urban municipality
- Flag Coat of arms

- Country: North Macedonia
- Region: Southeastern
- Municipal seat: Strumica

Government
  - Mayor: Kostadin Kostadinov (SDSM)

Population
  - Total: 49,995
  - Density: 170/km^{2} (440/sq mi)
- Time zone: UTC+1 (CET)
- Postal code: 2400
- Area code: 34
- Vehicle registration: SR
- Website: http://www.strumica.gov.mk

Strumica (Macedonian: Струмица [ˈstrumitsa]) is a municipality located in the eastern part of North Macedonia. Strumica is also the name of the city where the municipal seat is found. Strumica Municipality is part of the Southeastern Statistical Region.

== Geography ==
The municipality borders Valandovo Municipality to the southwest, Konče Municipality to the northwest, Vasilevo and Bosilovo municipalities to the north, Novo Selo Municipality to the east and Greece to the southeast.

== Demographics ==
According to the 2021 North Macedonia census, this municipality has 49,995 inhabitants. Ethnic groups in the municipality include:

	2002		2021	
	Number	%	Number	%
TOTAL	54,676	100	49,995	100
Macedonians	50,258	91.92	38,949	77.91
Turks	3,754	6.87	3,927	7.85
Roma	147	0.27	218	0.44
Serbs	185	0.34	99	0.2
Albanians	3	0.005	22	0.04
Vlachs	3	0.005	10	0.02
Bosniaks	6	0.01	3	0.01
Other / Undeclared / Unknown	320	0.58	287	0.57
Persons for whom data are taken from administrative sources			6,480	12.96
