= Radoviš Municipality =

Municipality of North Macedonia

Coordinates: 41.634373°N 22.466734°E

Municipality of Radoviš Општина Радовиш
- Urban municipality
- Flag Coat of arms

- Country: North Macedonia
- Region: Southeastern
- Municipal seat: Radoviš

Government
  - Mayor: Ljupche Pochivalec (VMRO-DPMNE)

Area
  - Total: 497.48 km^{2} (192.08 sq mi)

Population
  - Total: 24,122
- Time zone: UTC+1 (CET)
- Postal code: 2420
- Area code: 32
- Vehicle registration: RA
- Website: Official website

Radoviš Municipality (Macedonian: Општина Радовиш) is a municipality in eastern North Macedonia. Radoviš is the name of the city where the municipal seat is found. This municipality is part of the Southeastern Statistical Region.

== History ==
The city of Radoviš was mentioned for the first time in 1019 during the reign of the Gramotata of the Byzantium Tsar Vasilie the second (which was the name of the city during the Middle Ages. At this time in history, Radoviš an important center for regional trade, craftsmanship and mining.

The name Radoviš is connected with the Medieval Duchess "Rada" from Slavic origin, who used to live in the fortress above the city, the remains of which still exist.

During the 14th century Radoviš and Konče came under Serbian Rule, and in 1361, Tsar Uros stayed in Radoviš.

During the 19th and 20th centuries Radoviš and surrounding regions where influenced by historical events related to the Razlovo, Kresnensko and Ilinden Uprising along with the events related to the Balkan, First and Second World Wars.

During Turkish Hegemony in Macedonia in the 16th century, the Micro region was populated by a nomadic Turkish population called the Yörüks, an ethnic group that still exists to this day in this part of the world.

== Demographics ==
=== Ethnic affiliation ===
According to the 2021 North Macedonia census, this municipality has 24,122 inhabitants. Ethnic groups in the municipality include:

	2002		2021	
	Number	%	Number	%
TOTAL	28,244	100	24,122	100
Macedonians	23,752	84.1	17,278	71.63
Turks	4,061	14.38	4,013	16.64
Roma	271	0.96	261	1.08
Serbs	71	0.25	25	0.1
Albanians	8	0.03	24	0.09
Vlachs	26	0.1	14	0.06
Bosniaks	1	0.003	2	0.01
Other / Undeclared / Unknown	54	0.177	74	0.31
Persons for whom data are taken from administrative sources			2,431	10.08

=== Demographic trends ===
- Live births by ethnic affiliation of mother, 2010-2021

	Macedonians		Albanians		Turks		Roma		Others		TOTAL
Year	Births	%	Births	%	Births	%	Births	%	Births	%	Births
2010	231	62.60	8	2.17	119	32.25	9	2.44	2	0.54	369
2011	201	63.81	4	1.27	95	30.16	14	4.44	1	0.32	315
2012	224	59.89	7	1.87	116	31.02	25	6.68	2	0.53	374
2013	241	67.51	6	1.68	86	24.09	21	5.88	3	0.84	357
2014	227	68.58	2	0.60	84	25.38	18	5.44	0	0.00	331
2015	247	68.80	5	1.39	88	24.51	15	4.18	4	1.11	359
2016	227	69.63	5	1.53	83	25.46	11	3.37	0	0.00	326
2017	177	58.61	8	2.65	87	28.81	28	9.27	2	0.66	302
2018	193	61.66	4	1.28	88	28.12	26	8.31	2	0.64	313
2019	161	64.14	3	1.20	65	25.90	21	8.37	1	0.40	251
2020	137	52.69	12	4.62	93	35.77	18	6.92	0	0.00	260
2021	128	59.26	1	0.46	63	29.17	23	10.7	1	0.46	216
2022	110	58.82	1	0.05	57	30.48	17	9.09	2	1.06	187

== Local government ==
The mayor of Radoviš is elected directly through a local election. The current mayor is Ljupche Pochivalec. He won the local election in 2025. The party that won the local election in 2025 was VMRO-DPMNE.

== Culture ==
The cultural institutions that operate in the municipality of Radoviš are the culture center "Aco Karamanov", library "Braka Miladinovci", and three amateur drama studios.

During the year several events take place in the municipality of Radoviš such as the Radoviš cultural summer, children's folklor festival "Oro veselo", gajda injevo, and Aco Karamanov poetry meetings.

== Religion ==
Holy Trinity Orthodox church in Radoviš

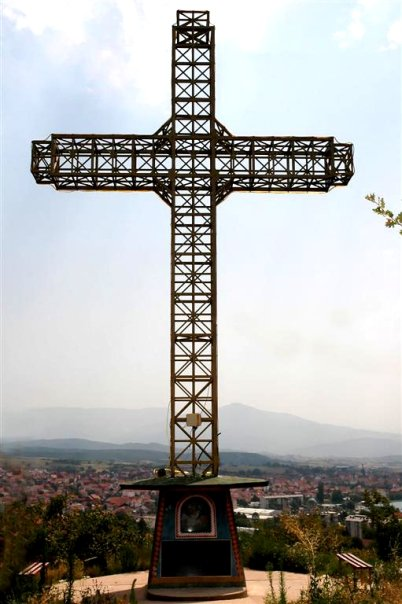
Holy Trinity Orthodox church in Radoviš

Municipality Radoviš is a mainly Orthodox, with minorities of Muslims, Protestants and Catholics.

There are three Eastern Orthodox churches, the new one Holy Trinity, the old one St.Ilija, and St. King Constantine and Queen Heena from the 18th century. There are also Orthodox monasteries such as those of St. Archangel Michael, St. Pantaleon and St. George.

There are also various Protestant churches, such as two Methodist churches, a Baptist church and a Jehovah's Witnesses Kingdom Hall; as well as two mosques.

Religion according to the 2002 Macedonia census and 2021 North Macedonia census:

	2002		2021	
	Number	%	Number	%
TOTAL	28,244	100	24,122	100
Orthodox	23,675	83.8	11,008	71.3
Christians / Protestants	3	0.01	6,159	71.3
Catholics	13	0.05	24	71.3
Islam	4,354	15.4	4,470	18.5
Others	199	0.70	30	0.12
Persons for whom data are taken from administrative sources	n/a	n/a	2,431	10.1

== Transport ==
Radoviš is linked with the neighbour cities Štip and Strumica by road.

Roads:

The national road M6 passes near Radoviš. It is the only way to arrive in the city. To the north the closest city is Štip (37 km from Radoviš), and to the south Strumica (29 km). Radoviš is 121 km far from the capital Skopje.

Airports:

The closest airport is Skopje International Airport located near the capital Skopje, 108 km north from Radoviš.

Taxis and Buses:

The Radoviš bus station is located on the boulevard Alexander Makedonski, it is 500 meters far from the city center. The bus station connects the city with the capital Skopje, Bitola, Prilep and the neibourgh cities. Taxis are all over the city. The price for a drive in the city is about 1.14 euro or 70 Macedonian denars. Taxis can also drive to the villages or to other Macedonian cities.

== Media and communications ==
There is only one private television channel - TV Kobra, also one cable TV operator - Telecabel, DVB-T (MPEG-4) - Vip TV, DirectToHome TV - TotalTV, Internet Providers (Cable, ADSL, WDSL, WiFi) and WiFi hotspots across the city. The three national mobile operators have full 4G coverage.

== Sport and leisure ==
The people in Radoviš, especially its youngest inhabitants, like sports. Favorite sports are Football, Basketball, Handball, Fishing, etc. Radoviš has its own Football club: FK Detonit Plachkovica, Handball club: RK Radoviš, also and Fishing club: Carp-Radoviš,. "Lebari" are the supporters of the Radoviš sport clubs. The supporters club "Lebari" (Macedonian: Лебари) was formed in 1991. They generally support all clubs in Radoviš, and mostly wear green and yellow symbols, which are the group colours.

In the past and now, Radoviš carries the attribute of a sports city. It can be called "The metropolis of wrestling in free and Greco-Roman style" in Europe and worldwide after Radoviš' favorite club BK "Bučim-Radovis" won the titles "European Club Champion in 1995" and "World Club Champion in 1996". The final competition for those titles as well as for other tournaments such as "Balkan Championship in Wrestling, Free and Greco-Roman Style" 1991 and "Macedonian Pearl" were held in the Sport Center in Radoviš "25 Maj".

The new sport center Šampion (Macedonian: Спортски Центар и Ресторан Шампион - Радовиш) was built in 1999, and consists of: Olympic swimming pool, small swimming pool, tennis courts, basketball courts, table tennis facility, handball court, soccer fields, gym and a restaurant.

== Schools and education ==
=== Elementary education ===
- OOU Krste Petkov Misirkov - Radoviš with about 1300 students, from 6 to 14 years old.
- OOU Nikola Karev - Radoviš with about 1100 students, from 6 to 14 years old.

=== Secondary education ===
- SOU Kosta Susinov - Radoviš with about 1200 students from 15 to 18 years old, where students can choose among these programs: Gymnasium, Metallurgy technician, and Electro-technician for Computer Technics and Automatics.

=== Higher education ===
- Faculty of Electrical engineering, part of the Goce Delčev University of Štip.

== Economy and industry ==
The economy of Municipality Radoviš runs through several activities such as: Mining, Building and Construction, Agriculture, Livestock Farming, Business and Trading, Tourism and Hospitality, Banking, Insurance, Health Industry, Crafts, Services, Transportation and traveling agencies.

The industry in Radoviš consists of several factories such as:

- Bučim (Бучим) - the only active mine in the Municipality of Radoviš and the only mine for copper and gold in North Macedonia. Bučim employs about 500 people. It is one of the most important industrial object in Radoviš and a driving force of the Radoviš industry and economy. The mine (directly and indirectly) contributed significantly to the initiation of other industrial activities such as the building industry, business, hospitality industry, transport and others.

- Jakatabak - for purchasing, manufacturing and processing of tobacco

- Jaka 80 - for manufacturing of pharmaceutical, cosmetic and nutritional products

- Šik Plačkovica - a company that produces cooked and uncooked beech materials and final products made of it

- Best Food TI - that processes vegetables and fruits

- Mlekara Gjorgievi Radoviš, formerly Kooperant - A company for purchasing and production of milk and milk products

- Textile & clothing factories (Mardi, Koneli, Markos and some others)

In the metal manufacturing industry the most important capacities are: Metalpromet and Semi

Building and Construction in Radoviš is an important industrial activity:

- TEHNIKA is the largest building company. Besides "Tehnika" there are many other entrepreneurs in the building industry. Their activities are mainly focused toward the individual building of residential housing and building of small industrial objects as well as weekend houses.

Other activities in the municipality of Radoviš are banking, insurance, transportation, travel, taxi-services and hospitality industry.

== People ==
Some notable people born in Radoviš are:

- Aco Karamanov - poem writer
- Milka Eftimova - opera singer
- Kosta Tsipushev
- Sibel Redzep
- Vasko Todorov - TV show artist

== International relations ==
=== Twin towns – Sister cities ===
Radoviš is twinned with:

- Selçuk, Turkey
- Velika Plana, Serbia

== Climate ==
The climate of Municipality Radoviš is moderate Mediterranean-Continental. With hot and dry summers. Winters are characteristic for their coldness, wetness and the snow falls very often. Average annual temperatures range from 12.5 to 13.0 °C in the valley and at the highest parts of the mountain ranges up to 7.5 °C (45 °F). The warmest months are July and August, when the temperatures are usually above 31 °C (88 °F), and often reach 40 °C (104 °F), and the average is 23 °C (73 °F). The coldest month is January with an average temperature of 1.2 °C (34 °F).

The average annual precipitation is 563 mm, with large fluctuations from year to year, but there is a difference between the mountain and the valley. As to the annual sum of sunshine hours, the region has 2326 sunshine hours per year, 6.4 hours per day, and 112 sunny days a year.

== Inhabited places ==
• Radoviš (seat) • Ali Koč • Ali Lobasi • Bučim • Češme Maale • Ćoselija • Damjan • Držani • Durutlija • Hudaverlija • Injevo • Jargulica • Kalauzlija • Kaluđerica • Karadžalar • Karalobosi • Kodžalija • Kozbunar • Novo Selo • Oraovica • Papavnica • Podareš • Pogulevo • Pokrajčevo • Prnalija • Rakliš • Sariđol • Smilanci • Suldurci • Supurge • Šaintaš • Šipkovica • Šturovo • Topolnica • Voislavci • Zleovo
