= List of people from Radoviš =

Below is a list of notable people born in Radoviš, North Macedonia or its surroundings.

- Dragan Gjorgiev
- Aco Karamanov
- Milka Eftimova
- Dragi Kocev
- Kosta Manev
- Sibel Redzep
- Kirčo Susinov
- Jovica Trajčev
- Kosta Tsipushev
