= Suldurci =

Suldurci Сулдурци
- Village
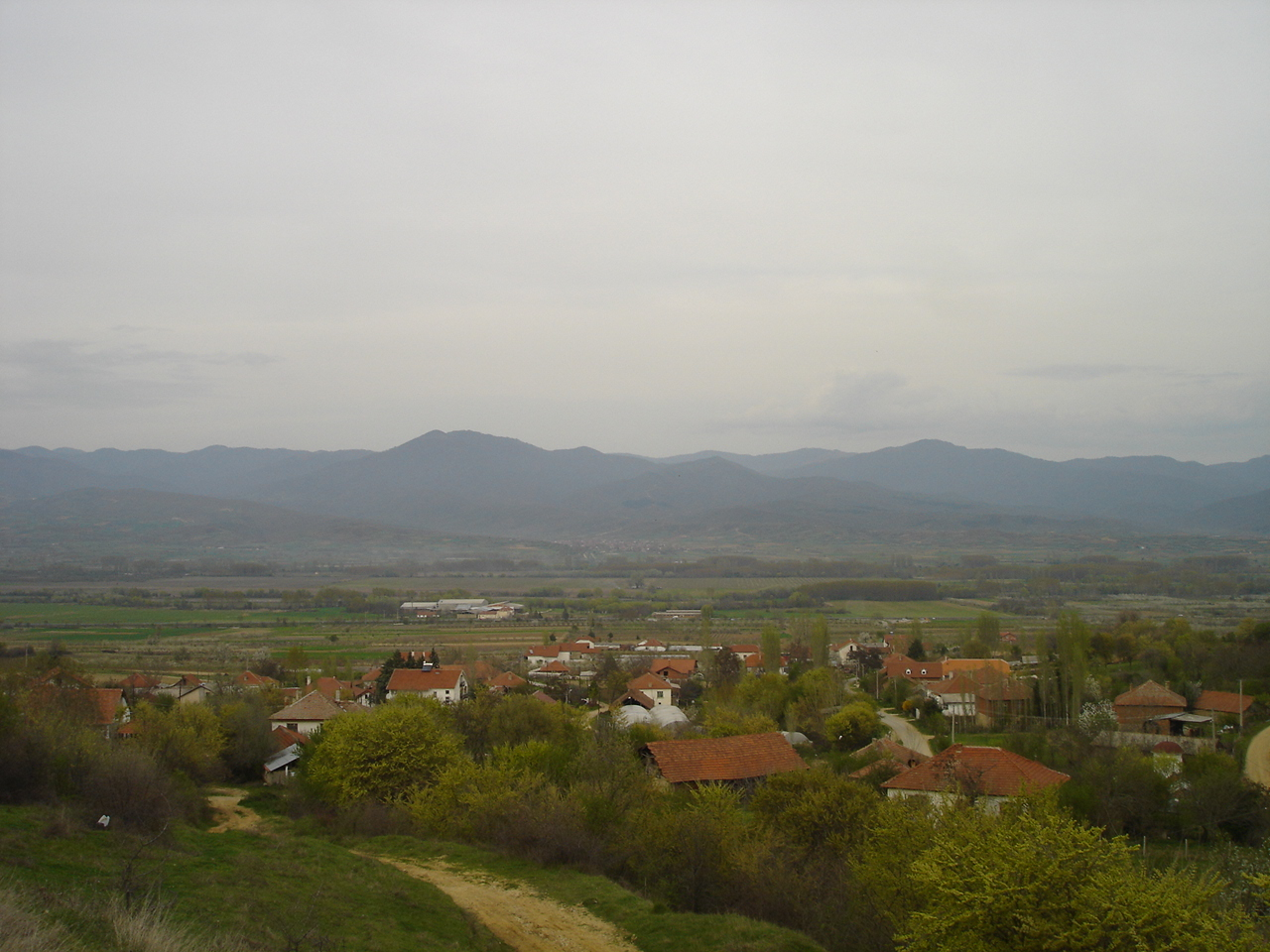
- View of the village

- Location within North Macedonia
- Coordinates: 41.583841°N 22.485847°E
- Country: North Macedonia
- Region: Southeastern
- Municipality: Radoviš

Population (2002)
  - Total: 228
- Time zone: UTC+1 (CET)
  - Summer (DST): UTC+2 (CEST)
- Website: .

Suldurci (Macedonian: Сулдурци) is a village in the municipality of Radoviš, North Macedonia.

With a 2021 population of

195- 2021 Source

In terms of demographics there are approximately three Albanians, the rest Macedonians and Mixed( more info can be found from the government concerns us 2021)

Notable places close by:

Notable places nearby include Iskaznik, a natural spring.

Two churches St.Elias and sulurci monetary.

It is right north of the Смрдеш

Neighbouring:

voislavci;

Kalugerica( kaluđerica)

In the common folklore the village got its name by the Turkish name Sulidur or Suldur, which was the name of a tax collector who had died there by being thrown off a cliff and who had cursed the village to not have more than 70 families.

== Demographics ==
According to the 2002 census, the village had a total of 228 inhabitants. Ethnic groups in the village include:

- Macedonians 228

As of 2021, the village of Suldurci has 195 inhabitants and the ethnic composition was the following:

- Macedonians – 174
- Albanians – 1
- Person without Data - 20
