= Zleovo =

Zleovo Злеово
- Village
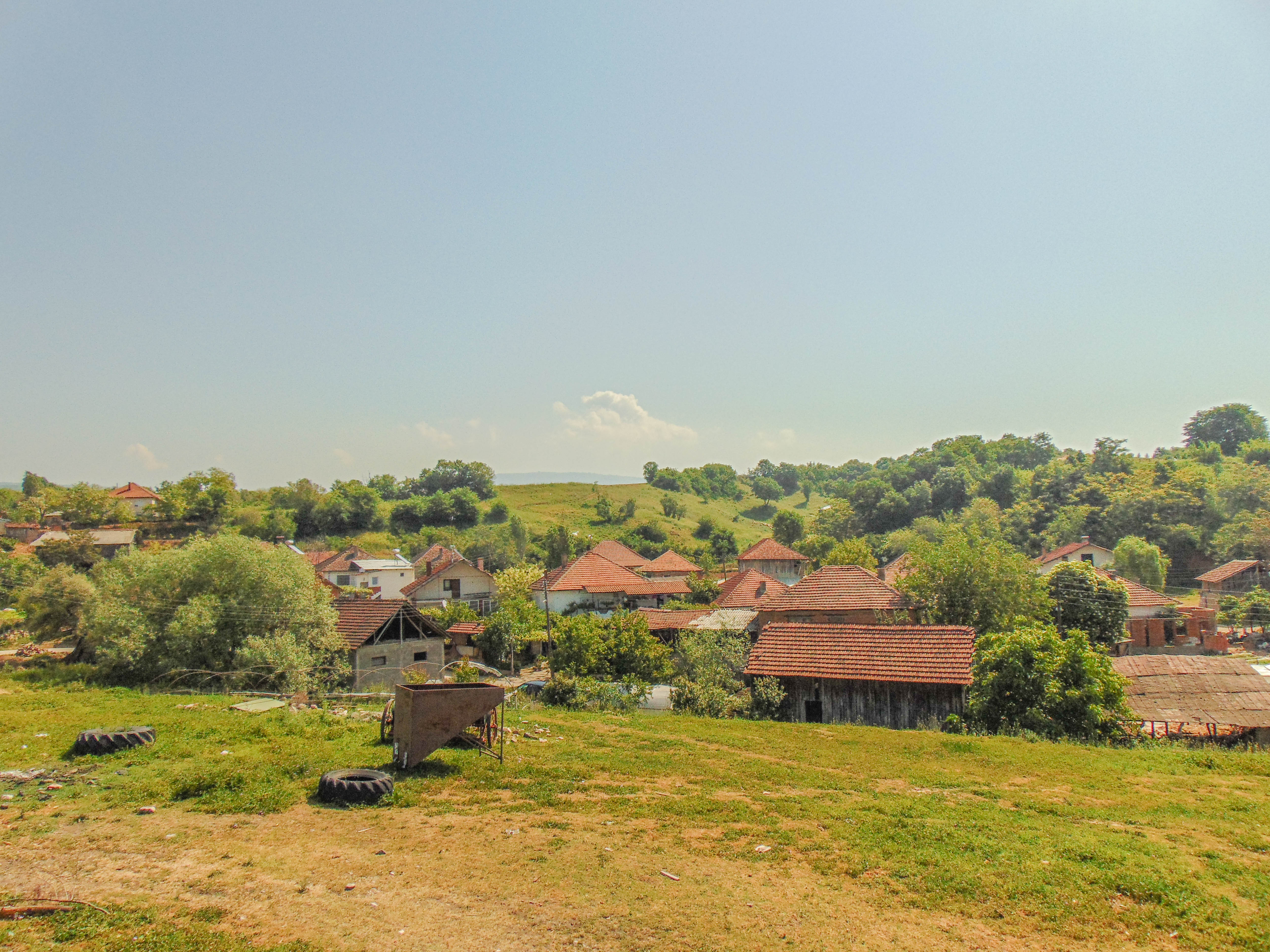
- View of the village

- Location within North Macedonia
- Coordinates: 41.555470°N 22.599875°E
- Country: North Macedonia
- Region: Southeastern
- Municipality: Radoviš

Population (2002)
  - Total: 928
- Time zone: UTC+1 (CET)
  - Summer (DST): UTC+2 (CEST)
- Website: .

Zleovo (Macedonian: Злеово) is a village in the municipality of Radoviš, North Macedonia. It used to be part of the former municipality of Podareš.

== Demographics ==
According to the 2002 census, the village had a total of 928 inhabitants. Ethnic groups in the village include:

- Macedonians 924
- Serbs 3
- Others 1

As of 2021, the village of Zleovo has 683 inhabitants and the ethnic composition was the following:

- Macedonians – 647
- others – 4
- Person without Data - 32
