= Jargulica =

Jargulica can refer to:

- Jargulica, Radoviš, a village in Radoviš Municipality, North Macedonia
- Jargulica, Valandovo, a village in Valandovo Municipality, North Macedonia
