= Rakliš =

Rakliš Раклиш
- Village
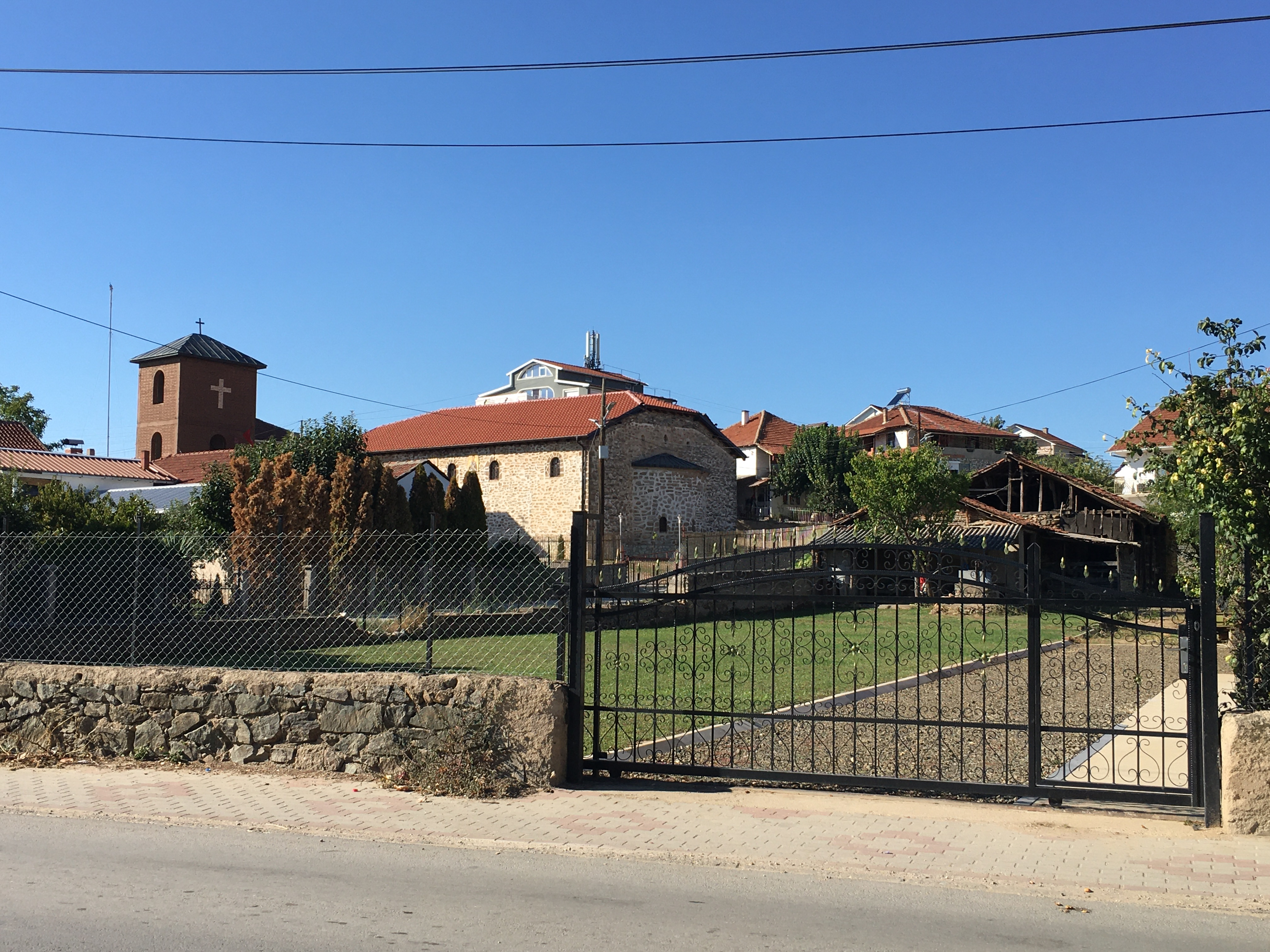
- View of the village

- Location within North Macedonia
- Country: North Macedonia
- Region: Southeastern
- Municipality: Radoviš

Population (2002)
  - Total: 570
- Time zone: UTC+1 (CET)
  - Summer (DST): UTC+2 (CEST)
- Website: .

Rakliš (Macedonian: Раклиш) is a village in the municipality of Radoviš, North Macedonia. It is located roughly 2 km from the centre of Radoviš.

== Demographics ==
According to the 2002 census, the village had a total of 570 inhabitants. Ethnic groups in the village include:

- Macedonians 561
- Turks 1
- Serbs 2
- Others 6

As of 2021, the village of Raklish has 559 inhabitants and the ethnic composition was the following:

- Macedonians – 509
- Turks - 11
- Romani - 3
- Albanians – 1
- others – 3
- Person without Data - 32

== Churches ==
- Sv. Konstantin I Elena (18th century)
