= Pokrajčevo =

Pokrajčevo Покрајчево
- Village
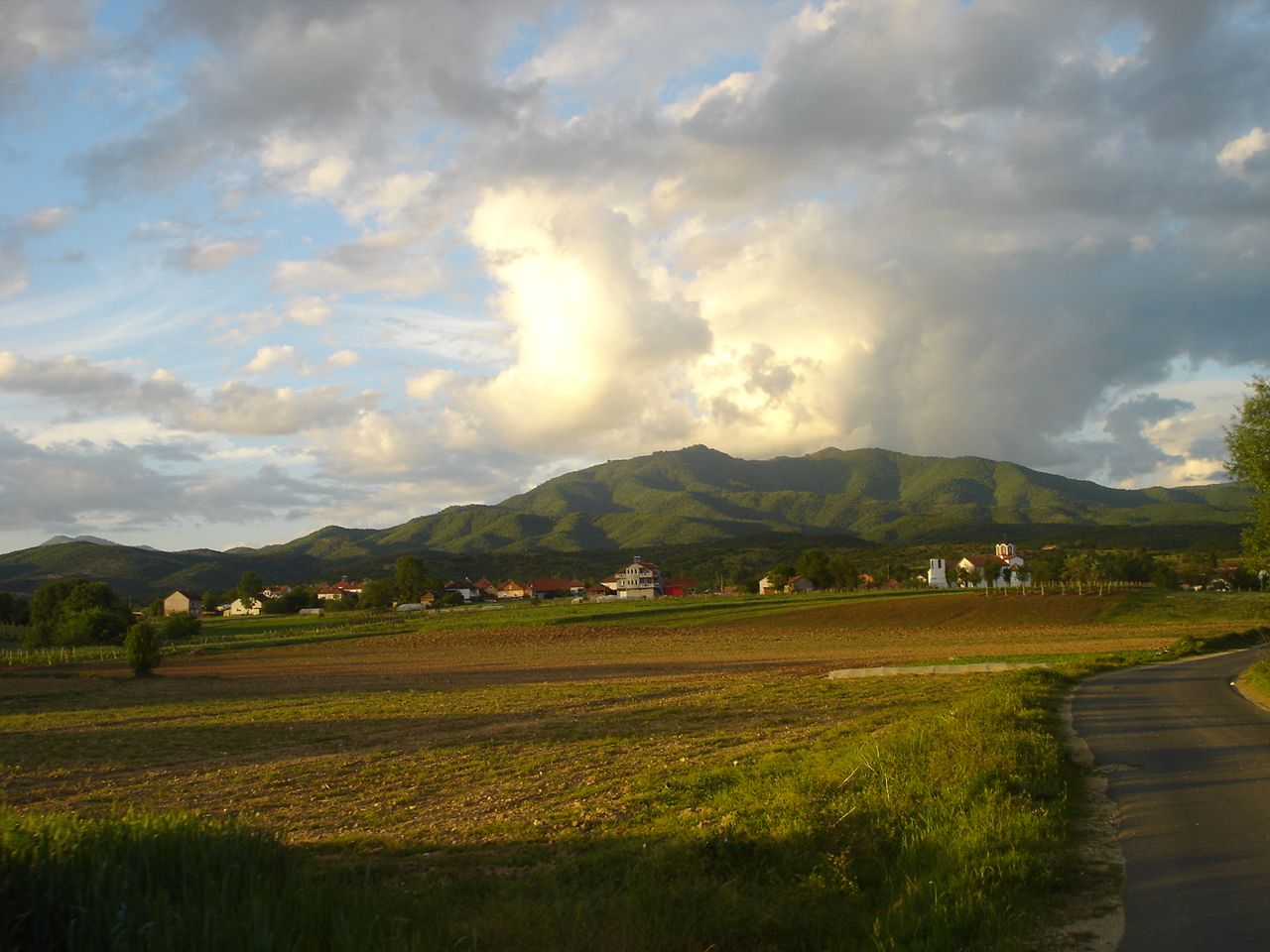
- View of the village

- Location within North Macedonia
- Coordinates: 41.573358°N 22.572147°E
- Country: North Macedonia
- Region: Southeastern
- Municipality: Radoviš

Population (2002)
  - Total: 434
- Time zone: UTC+1 (CET)
  - Summer (DST): UTC+2 (CEST)
- Website: .

Pokrajčevo (Macedonian: Покрајчево) is a village in the municipality of Radoviš, North Macedonia. It used to be part of the former municipality of Podareš.

== Demographics ==
According to the 2002 census, the village had a total of 434 inhabitants. Ethnic groups in the village include:

- Macedonians 434

As of 2021, the village of Pоkrajchevo has 319 inhabitants and the ethnic composition was the following:

- Macedonians – 298
- Person without Data - 21
