= Topolnica, Radoviš =

Topolnica Тополница
- Village
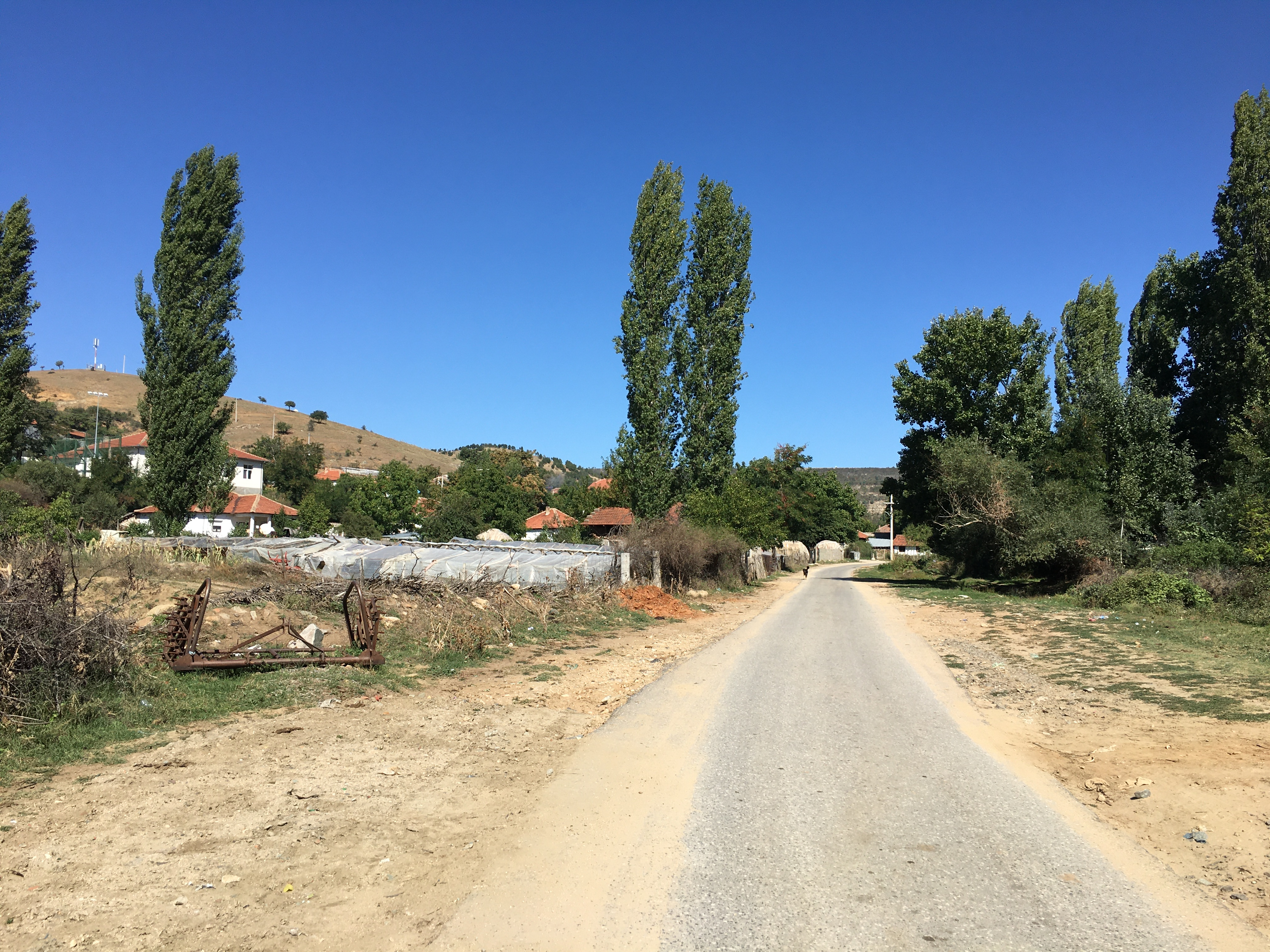
- View of the village

- Location within North Macedonia
- Coordinates: 41.656886°N 22.377870°E
- Country: North Macedonia
- Region: Southeastern
- Municipality: Radoviš

Population (2002)
  - Total: 562
- Time zone: UTC+1 (CET)
  - Summer (DST): UTC+2 (CEST)

Topolnica (Macedonian: Тополница) is a village in the municipality of Radoviš, North Macedonia.

== Demographics ==
According to the 2002 census, the village had a total of 562 inhabitants. Ethnic groups in the village include:

- Macedonians 55
- Turks 499
- Albanians 7
- Others 1

As of 2021, the village of Topolnica has 414 inhabitants and the ethnic composition was the following:

- Turks - 380
- Albanians – 4
- Bosniaks – 2
- Person without Data - 28
