= SOU Kosta Susinov – Radoviš =

SOU "Kosta Susinov" - Radoviš
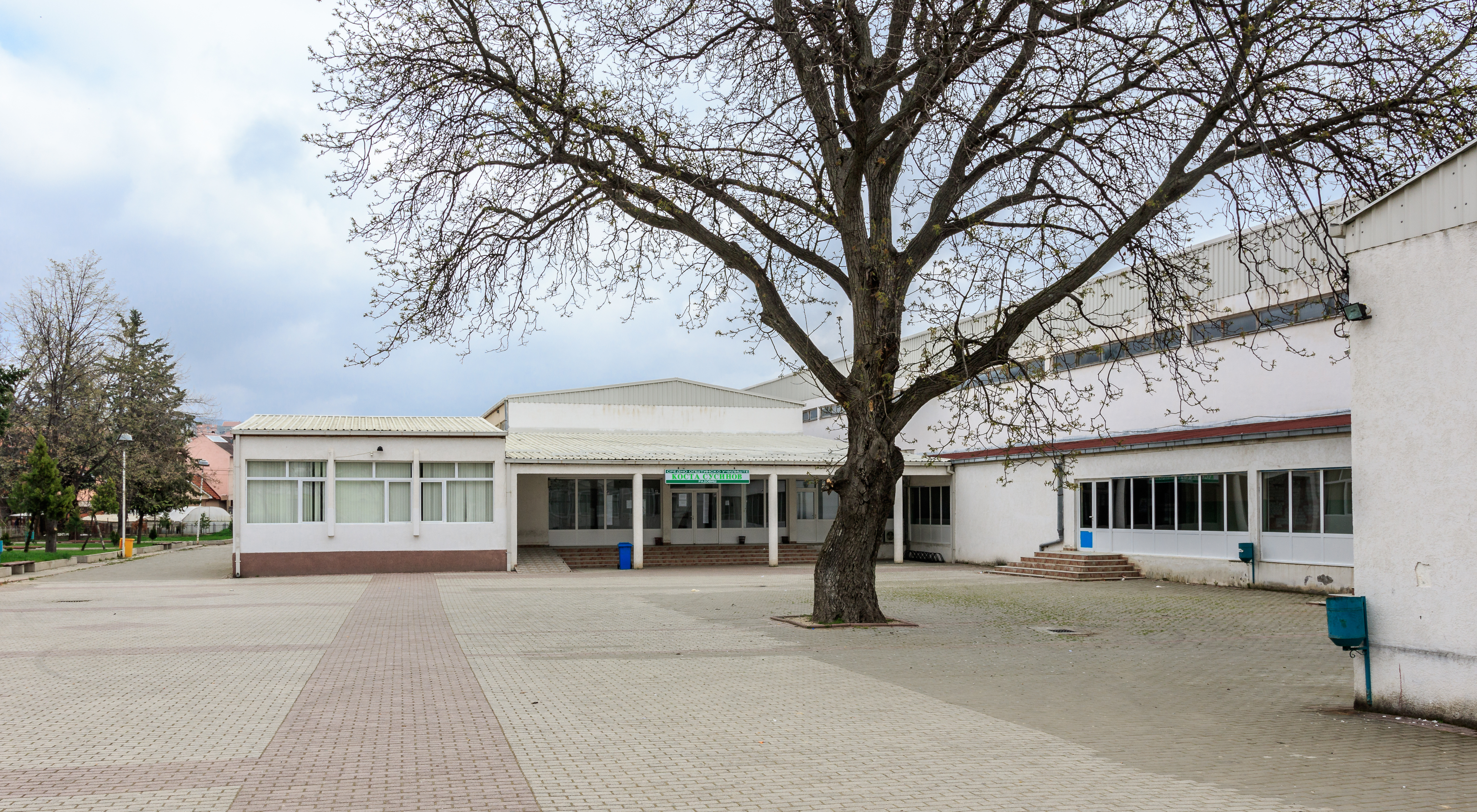
- Radoviš; North Macedonia

Information
- Type: Public secondary school
- Grades: 1 – 4 year
- Enrollment: ~1200
- Nickname: Gymnasium
- Website: http://kostasusinov.schools.edu.mk/

SOU "Kosta Susinov" - Radoviš (Macedonian: СОУ „Коста Сусинов“ - Радовиш), is a secondary school in Radoviš, North Macedonia. The school educate students from grade 9 to grade 12, which counts for year 1 to year 4 (15–18 years of age students), and it is equivalent to a Freshman, Sophomore, Junior and Senior year of High school studies in some other parts of the world such as the United States. School usually begins in early September of each year and ends in early June. During the excess two and a half months, the students are given summer vacation to rest from the school year.

== Programs ==
Students enrolled in the school choose one of these programs:

- Gymnasium
- Metallurgy technician
- Electro-technician for Computer Technics and Automatics

== See also ==
- Education in North Macedonia
- Radoviš
