= Ali Koč =

Ali Koč Али Коч
- Village
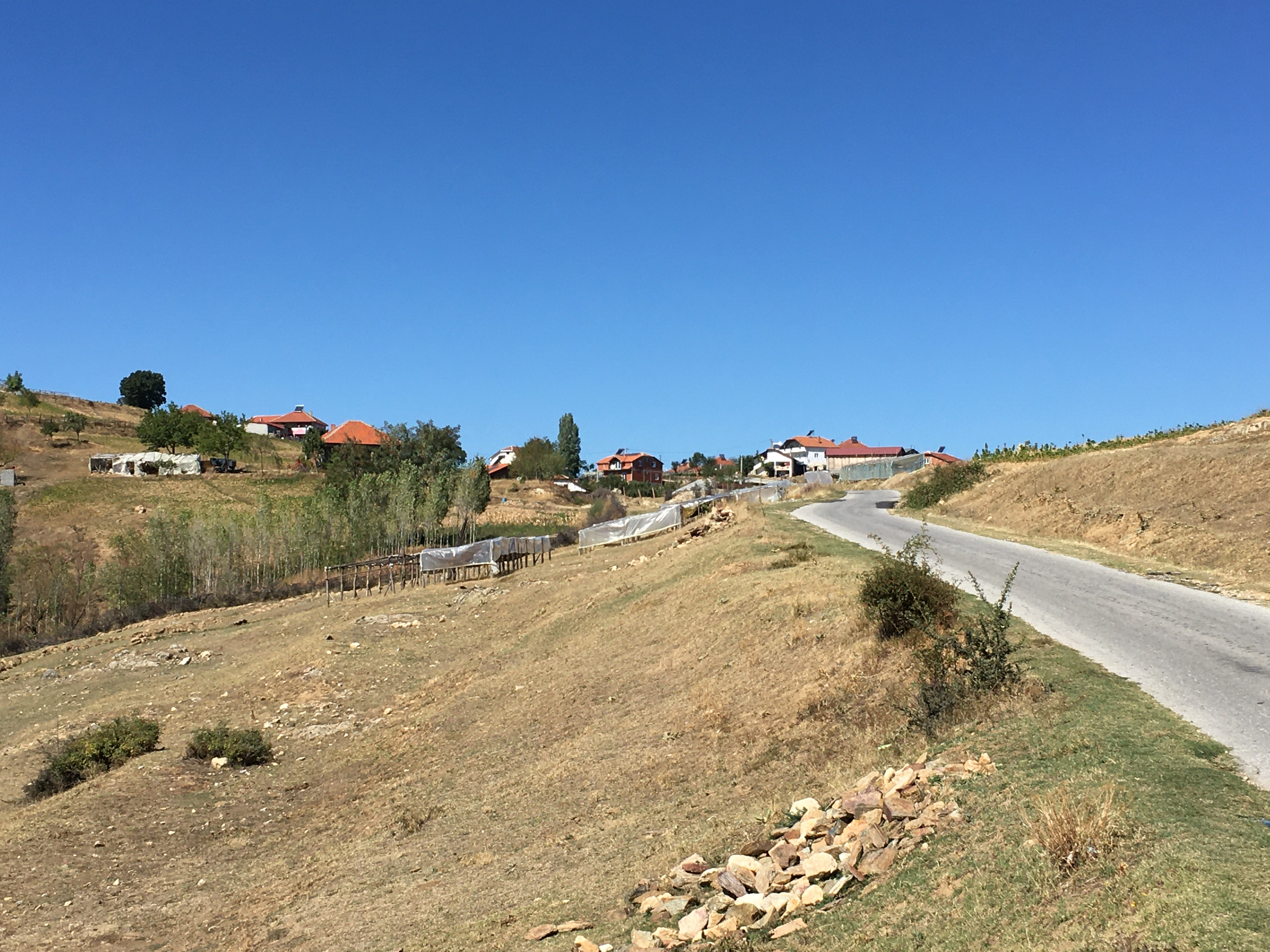
- View of the village

- Location within North Macedonia
- Coordinates: 41.679351°N 22.428565°E
- Country: North Macedonia
- Region: Southeastern
- Municipality: Radoviš

Population (2021)
  - Total: 393
- Time zone: UTC+1 (CET)
  - Summer (DST): UTC+2 (CEST)
- Website: .

Ali Koč (Macedonian: Али Коч) is a village in the municipality of Radoviš, North Macedonia.

== Popular culture ==
In 2023 the movie DJ Ahmet was filmed in Ali Koč

== Demographics ==
According to the 2002 census, the village had a total of 328 inhabitants. Ethnic groups in the village include:

- Turks 328

As of 2021, the village of Аli Koch has 393 inhabitants and the ethnic composition was the following:

- Turks – 387
- Person without Data - 6
