= Jargulica, Radoviš =

Jargulica Јаргулица
- Village
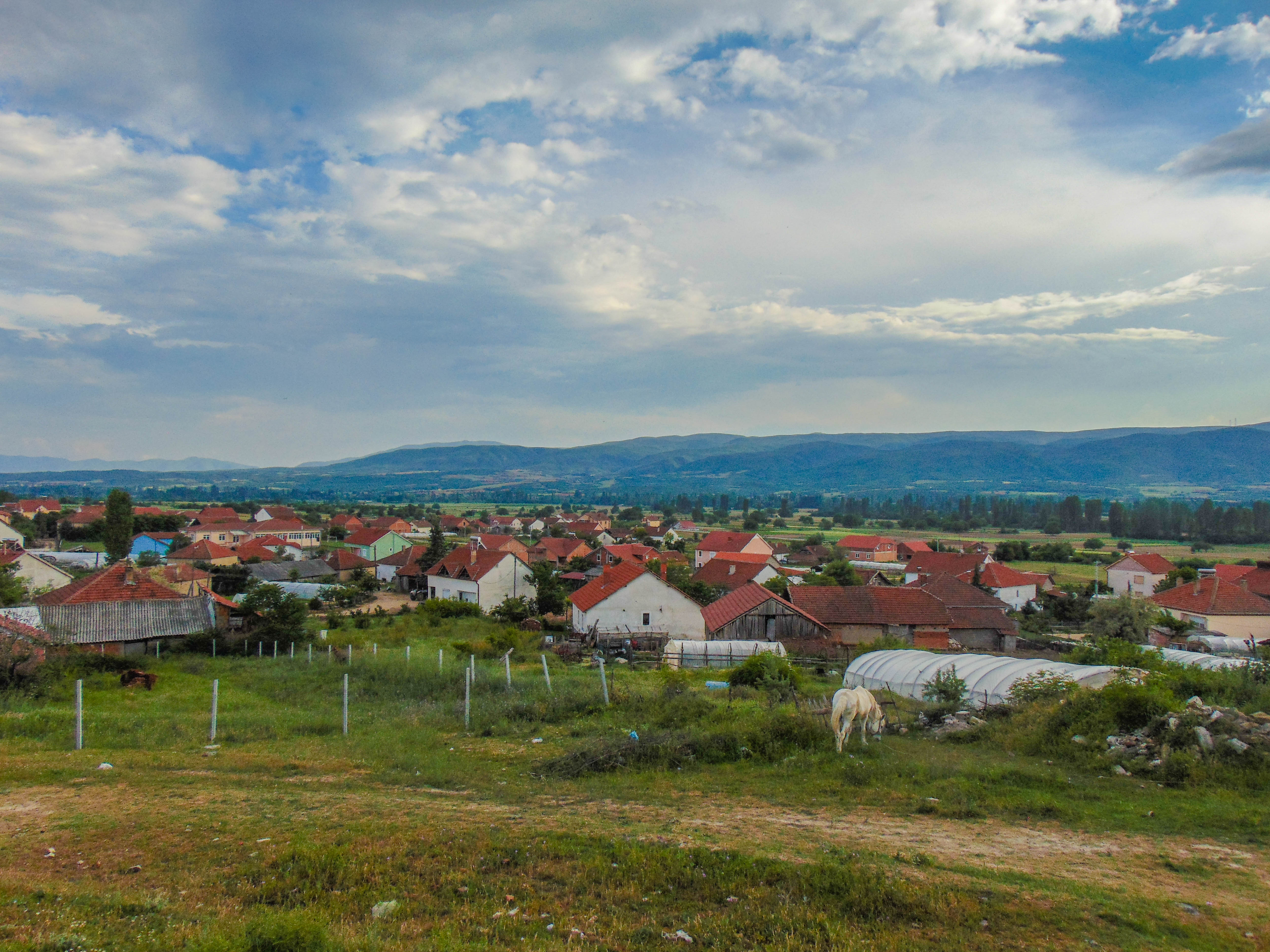
- View of the village

- Location within North Macedonia
- Country: North Macedonia
- Region: Southeastern
- Municipality: Radoviš

Population (2002)
  - Total: 818
- Time zone: UTC+1 (CET)
  - Summer (DST): UTC+2 (CEST)
- Website: .

Jargulica (Macedonian: Јаргулица) is a village in the municipality of Radoviš, North Macedonia. It is located 12 kilometres (7.5 mi) from Radoviš. It used to be part of the former municipality of Podareš.

== Demographics ==
According to the 2002 census, the village had a total of 818 inhabitants. Ethnic groups in the village include:

- Macedonians 816
- Turks 2

As of 2021, the village of Јargulica has 628 inhabitants and the ethnic composition was the following:

- Macedonians – 567
- Person without Data - 61
