= Kalauzlija, Radoviš =

Kalauzlija Калаузлија
- Village
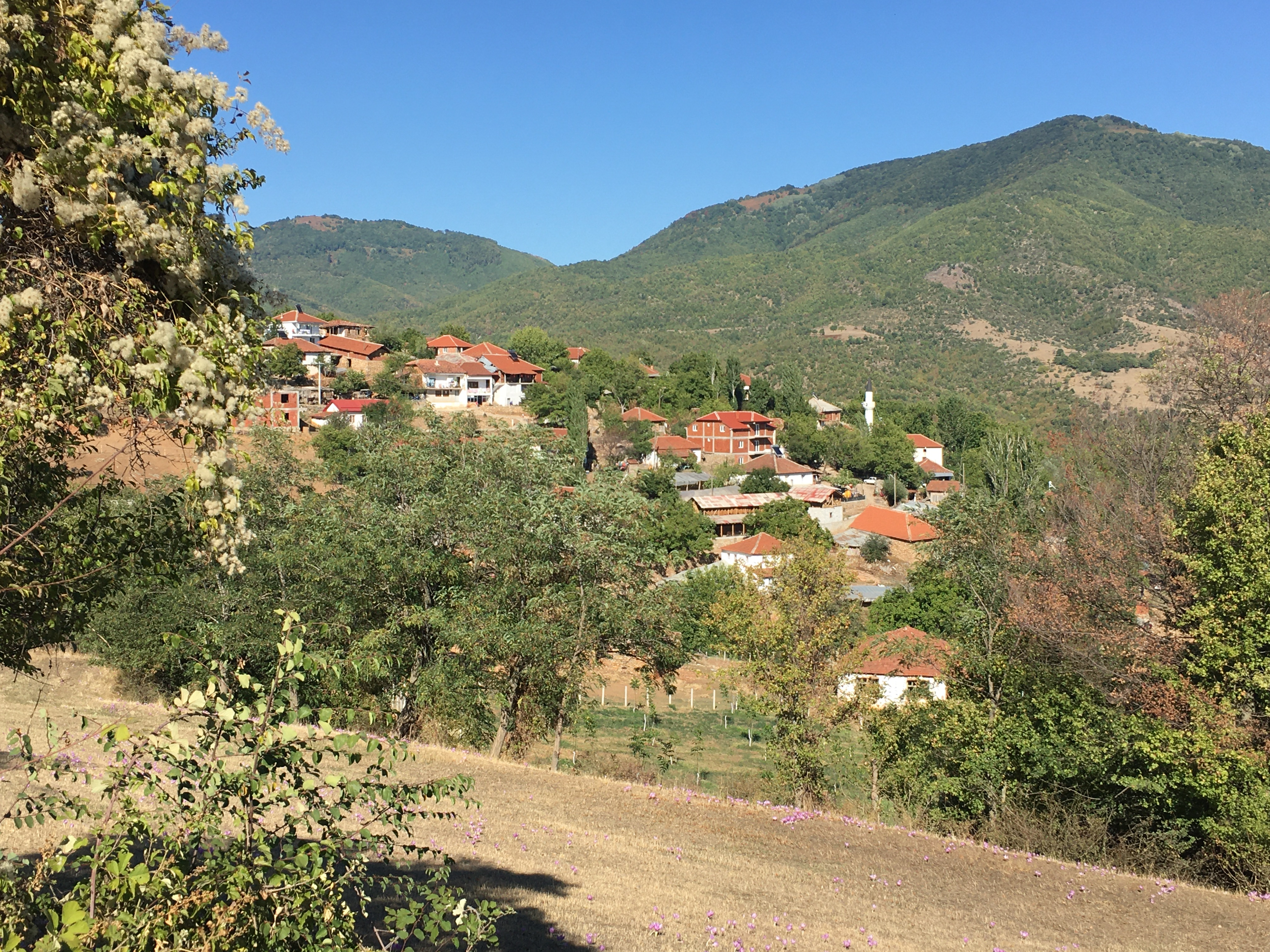
- View of the village

- Location within North Macedonia
- Coordinates: 41.669799°N 22.493785°E
- Country: North Macedonia
- Region: Southeastern
- Municipality: Radoviš

Population (2002)
  - Total: 279
- Time zone: UTC+1 (CET)
  - Summer (DST): UTC+2 (CEST)
- Website: .

Kalauzlija (Macedonian: Калаузлија) is a village in the municipality of Radoviš, North Macedonia.

== Demographics ==
According to the 2002 census, the village had a total of 279 inhabitants. Ethnic groups in the village include:

- Turks 279

As of 2021, the village of Кalauzlija has 351 too3 inhabitants and the ethnic composition was the following:

- Turks – 341
- Person without Data - 10
