= Bučim =

Bučim Бучим
- Village
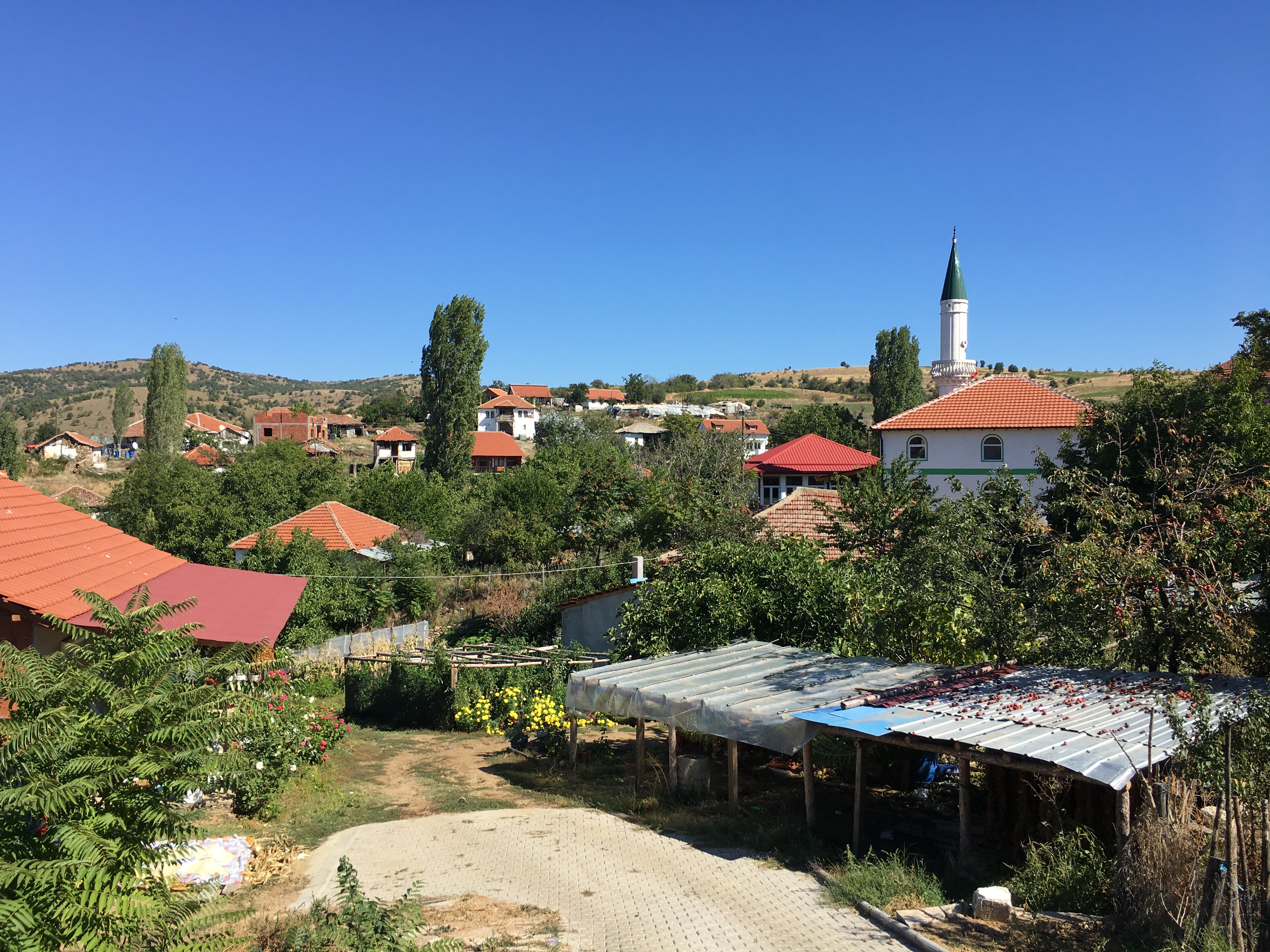
- View of the village

- Location within North Macedonia
- Coordinates: 41.670163°N 22.339621°E
- Country: North Macedonia
- Region: Southeastern
- Municipality: Radoviš

Population (2021)
  - Total: 400
- Time zone: UTC+1 (CET)
  - Summer (DST): UTC+2 (CEST)
- Website: .

Bučim (Macedonian: Бучим) is a village in the municipality of Radoviš, North Macedonia.

== Demographics ==
According to the 2002 census, the village had a total of 320 inhabitants. Ethnic groups in the village include:

- Turks 320

As of 2021, the village of Buchim has 400 inhabitants and the ethnic composition was the following:

- Turks – 388
- Person without Data - 12
