= Prnalija, Radoviš =

Prnalija Прналија
- Village
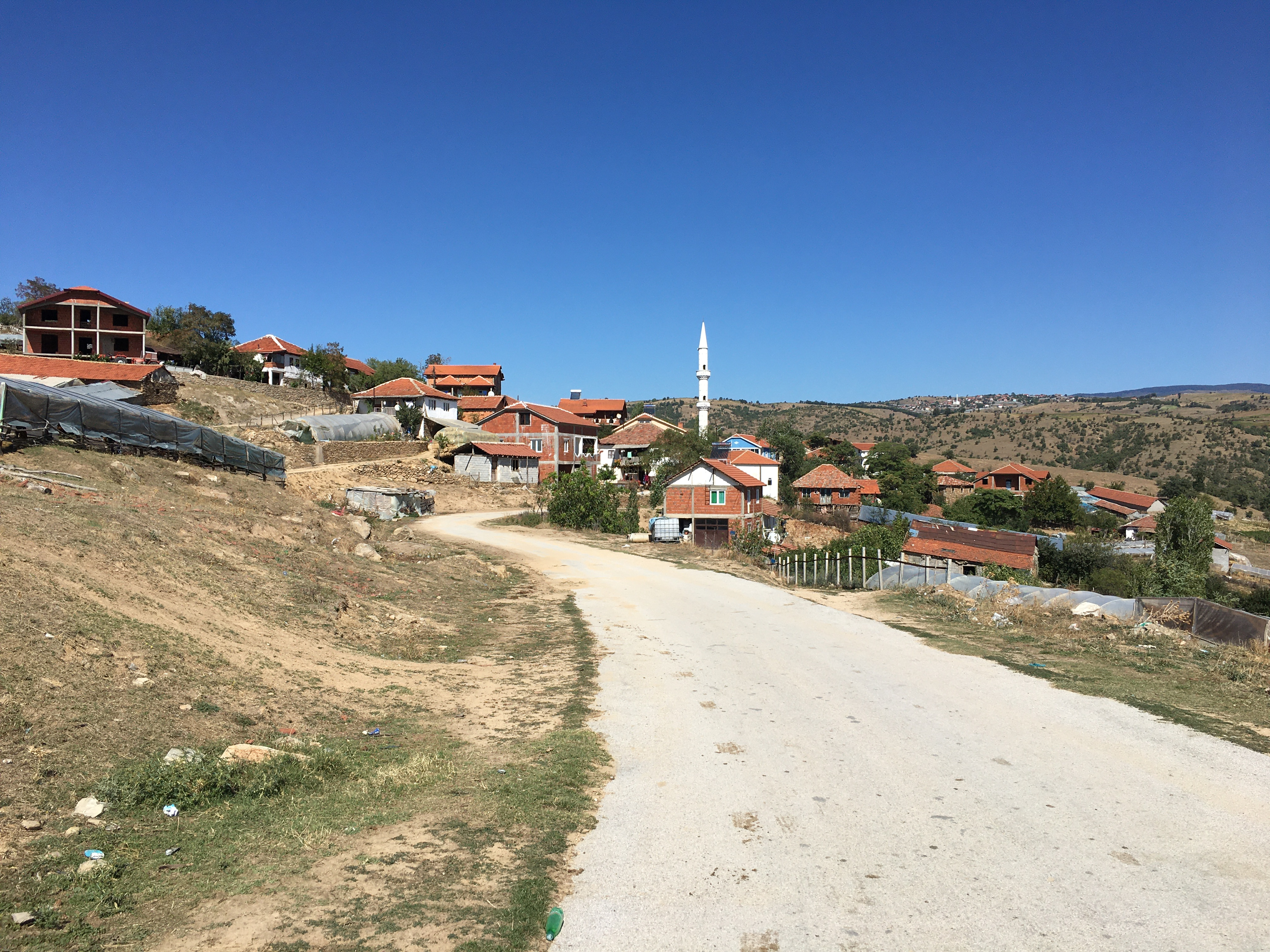
- View of the village

- Location within North Macedonia
- Coordinates: 41.660931°N 22.412945°E
- Country: North Macedonia
- Region: Southeastern
- Municipality: Radoviš

Population (2002)
  - Total: 122
- Time zone: UTC+1 (CET)
  - Summer (DST): UTC+2 (CEST)
- Website: .

Prnalija (Macedonian: Прналија) is a village in the municipality of Radoviš, North Macedonia.

== Demographics ==
According to the 2002 census, the village had a total of 122 inhabitants. Ethnic groups in the village include:

- Turks 122

As of 2021, the village of Prnalija has 153 inhabitants and the ethnic composition was the following:

- Turks - 149
- Albanians – 1
- Person without Data - 3
