= Damjan, Radoviš =

Damjan Дамјан
- Village
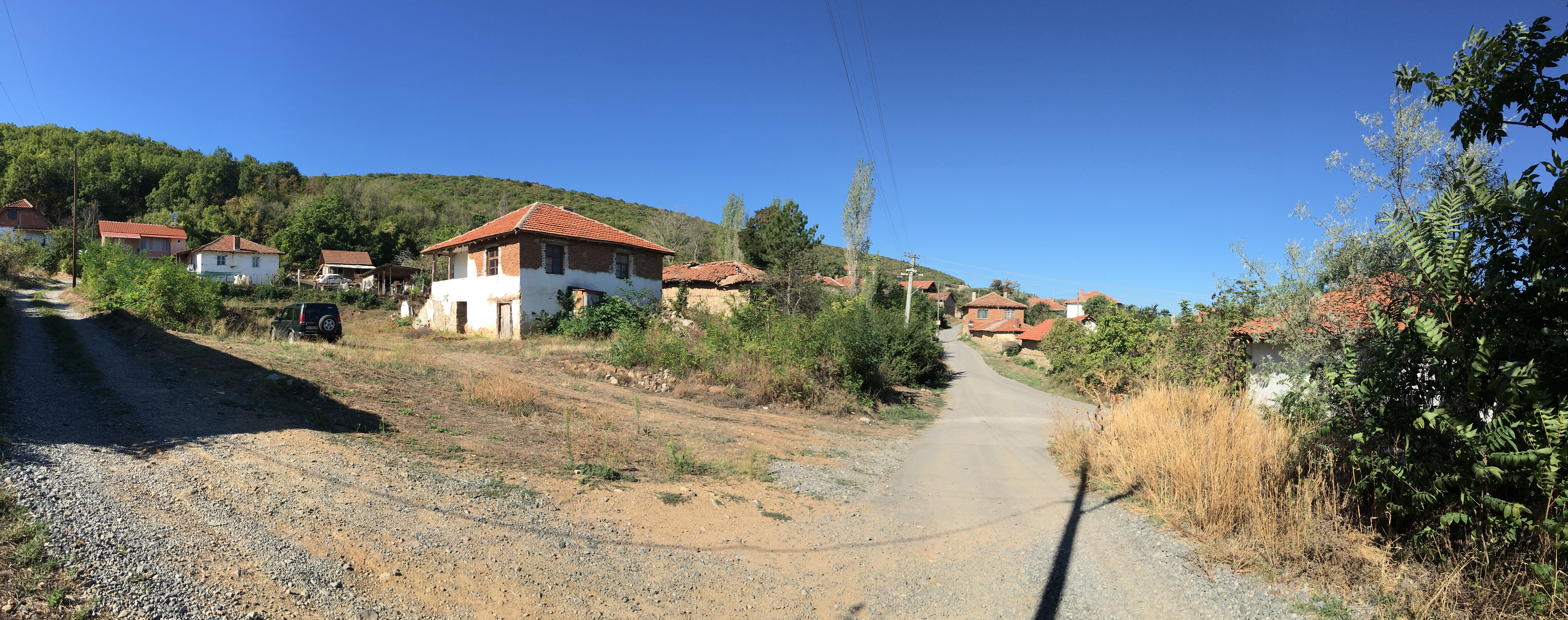
- Panoramic view of the village

- Location within North Macedonia
- Coordinates: 41.613299°N 22.360435°E
- Country: North Macedonia
- Region: Southeastern
- Municipality: Radoviš

Population (2021)
  - Total: 175
- Time zone: UTC+1 (CET)
  - Summer (DST): UTC+2 (CEST)
- Website: .

Damjan (Macedonian: Дамјан) is a village in the municipality of Radoviš, North Macedonia.

== Demographics ==
According to the 2002 census, the village had a total of 311 inhabitants. Ethnic groups in the village include:

- Macedonians 304
- Aromanians 6
- Others 1

As of 2021, the village of Damjan has 175 inhabitants and the ethnic composition was the following:

- Macedonians – 149
- Aromanians – 3
- Person without Data - 23
