= Kodžalija =

Kodžalija Коџалија
- Village
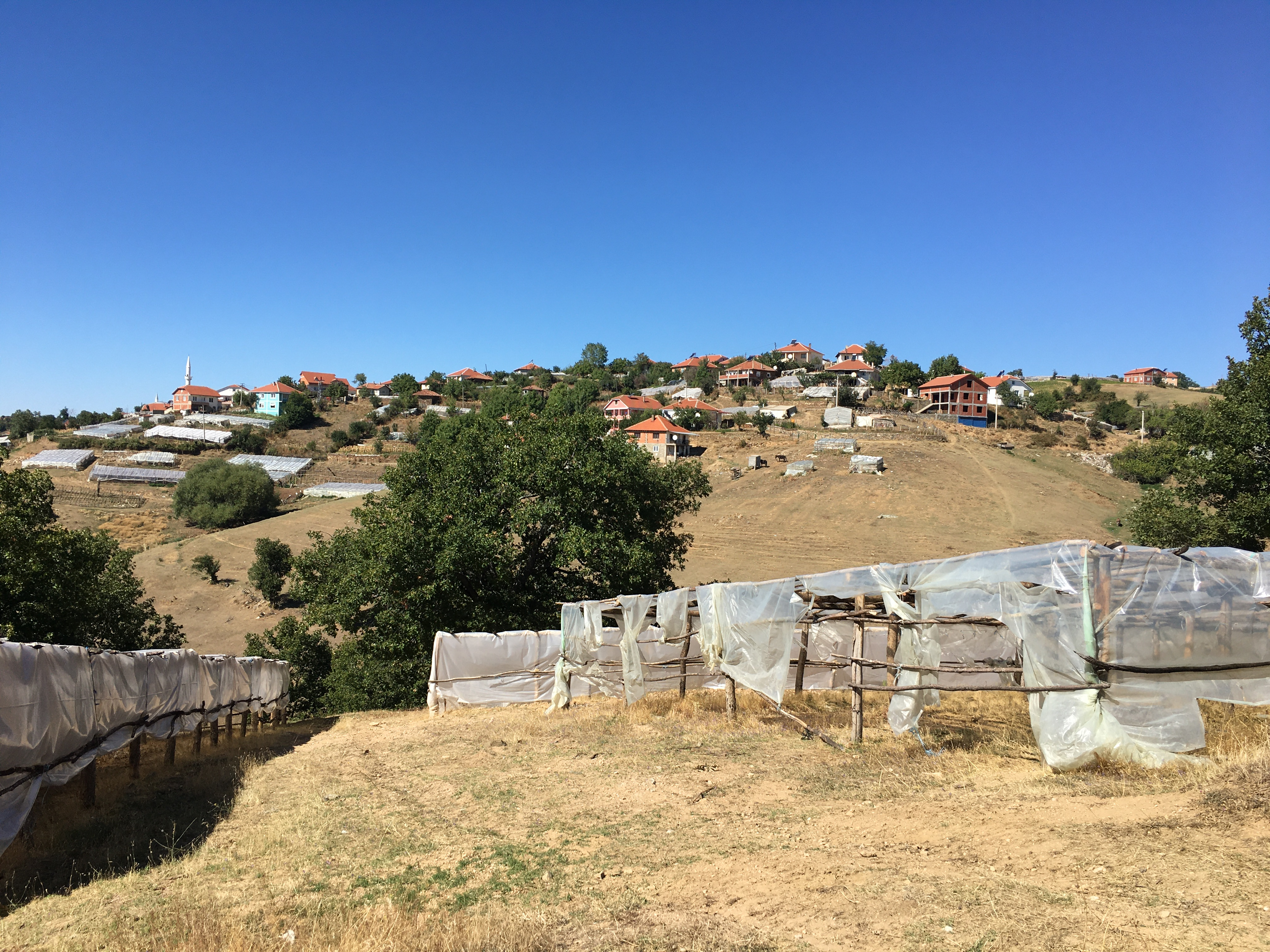
- View of the village

- Location within North Macedonia
- Coordinates: 41.688826°N 22.420193°E
- Country: North Macedonia
- Region: Southeastern
- Municipality: Radoviš

Population (2002)
  - Total: 478
- Time zone: UTC+1 (CET)
  - Summer (DST): UTC+2 (CEST)
- Website: .

Kodžalija (Macedonian: Коџалија) is a village in the municipality of Radoviš, North Macedonia.

== Popular culture ==
In 2023 the movie DJ Ahmet was filmed in Kodžalija

== Demographics ==
According to the 2002 census, the village had a total of 478 inhabitants. Ethnic groups in the village include:

- Turks 478
