= DJ Ahmet =

2025 film by Georgi M. Unkovski

- International promotional poster
- Macedonian: Диџеј Ахмет
- Directed by: Georgi M. Unkovski
- Written by: Georgi M. Unkovski
- Produced by: Ivan Unkovski; Ivana Shekutkoska
- Starring: Arif Jakup; Agush Agushev; Dora Akan Zlatanova; Aksel Mehmet; Selpin Kerim; Atila Klince
- Cinematography: Naum Doksevski
- Edited by: Michal Reich
- Music by: Alen Sinkauz; Nenad Sinkauz
- Production companies: Cinema Futura; Alter Vision; Backroom Production; 365 Films; Analog Vision; Film House Bas Celik; Sektor Film
- Release dates: 23 January 2025 (Sundance); 18 July 2026 (North Macedonia)
- Running time: 99 minutes
- Countries: North Macedonia; Czech Republic; Serbia; Croatia
- Languages: Turkish; Macedonian; English
- Budget: €978,000

DJ Ahmet (Macedonian: Диџеј Ахмет) is a 2025 drama film directed and written by Georgi M. Unkovski. A co-production of North Macedonia, Czech Republic, Serbia, and Croatia, it follows the life of Ahmet (Arif Jakup), a 15-year-old boy in rural North Macedonia.

The film had its world premiere at the World Cinema Competition section of the 2025 Sundance Film Festival on 23 January, where it won the section's Audience Award. It was theatrically released in North Macedonia on 18 July 2026.

== Synopsis ==
The film is centered around the life of 15-year-old boy, Ahmet, who falls in love for the first time, desires to be a DJ, and contends with the conservatism of his rural village in North Macedonia.

== Cast ==
- Arif Jakup as Ahmet
- Agush Agushev as Naim
- Dora Akan Zlatanova as Aya
- Aksel Mehmet
- Selpin Kerim
- Atila Klince as The Muezzin

== Production ==
Following Unkovski's 2019 short film and 2020 Sundance entry, Sticker, DJ Ahmet took five years to create with numerous difficulties in funding and production. Initially being turned down shortly before the COVID-19 pandemic. Financing took place from 2021 to 2023. Most of the film's production was then completed in the two years leading up to its Sundance Film Festival premiere. Principal photography took 36 days near the end of 2023; filming took place in the villages of Kodžalija, Ali Koč, and Skopje. Post-production followed for a year.

The film's budget was 978,000 euros. It was supported by the North Macedonia Film Agency, Eurimages, the Croatian Audiovisual Centre, Film Center Serbia, the Czech Film Fund, and the South Eastern Europe Cinema Network.

== Release ==
On December 11, 2024, Films Boutique announced that it had acquired international rights for DJ Ahmet.

DJ Ahmet premiered at the 2025 Sundance Film Festival on January 23, 2025. It was also shown at the 72nd Sydney Film Festival It competed for Heart of Sarajevo award in the Competition Programme - Feature Film at the 31st Sarajevo Film Festival in August 2025. It was also showcased at the 53rd Norwegian International Film Festival in Prespektiver section on 16 August 2025.

It competed in the Stockholm Competition of the 2025 Stockholm International Film Festival on November 5, 2025.

== Critical reception ==
On the review aggregator website Rotten Tomatoes, 91% of 22 critics' reviews are positive.

The Hollywood Reporter lauded the "solid naturalistic performances" of the film's cast, with particular attention to Jakup, and stated it "has a slick, crowd-pleasing quality that could entice streamers or select distributors. The film playfully critiques certain Muslim customs, but never in a demeaning way, while providing a heartwarming coming-of-age narrative that’s a tad predictable."

ScreenAnarchy lauded Unkovski as a "smart director" and said that the film "is both wildly exotic and completely down to earth, tied to a specific culture yet dealing with universally recognizable problems. It's an auspicious debut."

In a review for Variety, Carlos Aguilar praised the film as a "revelation" that "seamlessly straddles the line between laugh-out-loud crowd-pleaser and art-house gem with affecting gravitas". He highlighted Unkovski’s perceptive writing, which contrasts youth plugged into the modern world with the weight of tradition, and called Jakup’s lead performance "quietly soulful". Visually, Aguilar noted the film’s "striking visuals and vibrant color".

== Accolades ==
Award	Ceremony date	Category	Recipient(s)	Result	Ref.
Sundance Film Festival	2 February 2025	World Cinema Grand Jury Prize: Dramatic	DJ Ahmet	Nominated	
Sundance Film Festival	2 February 2025	World Cinema Dramatic - Audience Awards	DJ Ahmet	Won	
Sundance Film Festival	2 February 2025	World Cinema Dramatic Special Jury Award for Creative Vision	DJ Ahmet	Won	
Milwaukee Film Festival	14 May 2025	Emerging Fiction Jury Award	DJ Ahmet	Nominated	
Milwaukee Film Festival	14 May 2025	Emerging Fiction Jury Award - Special Mention	DJ Ahmet	Won	
Seattle International Film Festival	25 May 2025	New Directors Competition Grand Jury Prize	DJ Ahmet	Nominated	
Seattle International Film Festival	25 May 2025	New Directors Competition Special Jury Mention	DJ Ahmet	Won	
Sydney Film Festival	15 June 2025	Sydney Film Prize	DJ Ahmet	Nominated	
Sydney Film Festival	15 June 2025	GIO Audience Awards - Best International Feature	DJ Ahmet	Runner-up	
Sarajevo Film Festival	22 August 2025	Heart of Sarajevo	DJ Ahmet	Nominated	
Cinéfest Sudbury International Film Festival	25 September 2025	Outstanding International Feature	DJ Ahmet	Won	
