= Radoviš =

Radoviš Радовиш (Macedonian)
- City
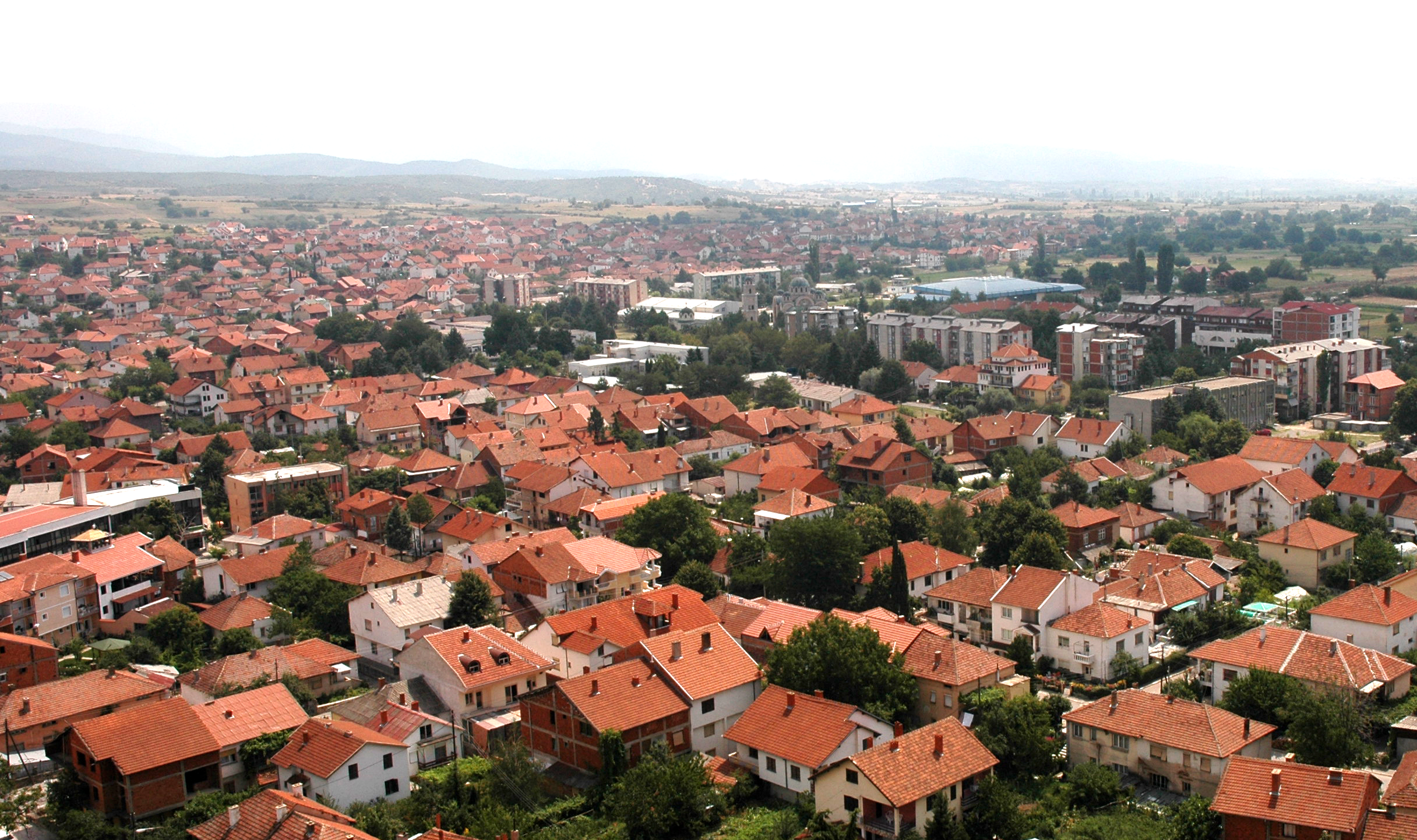
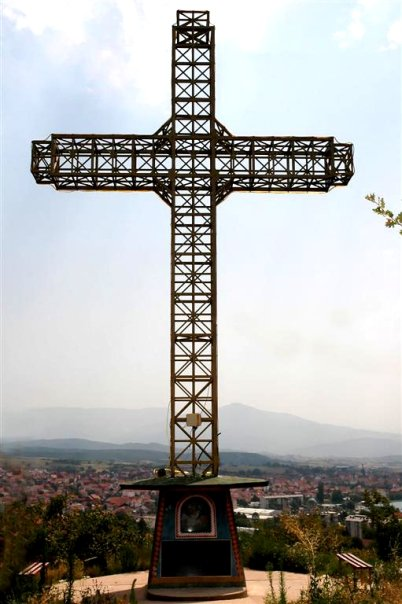
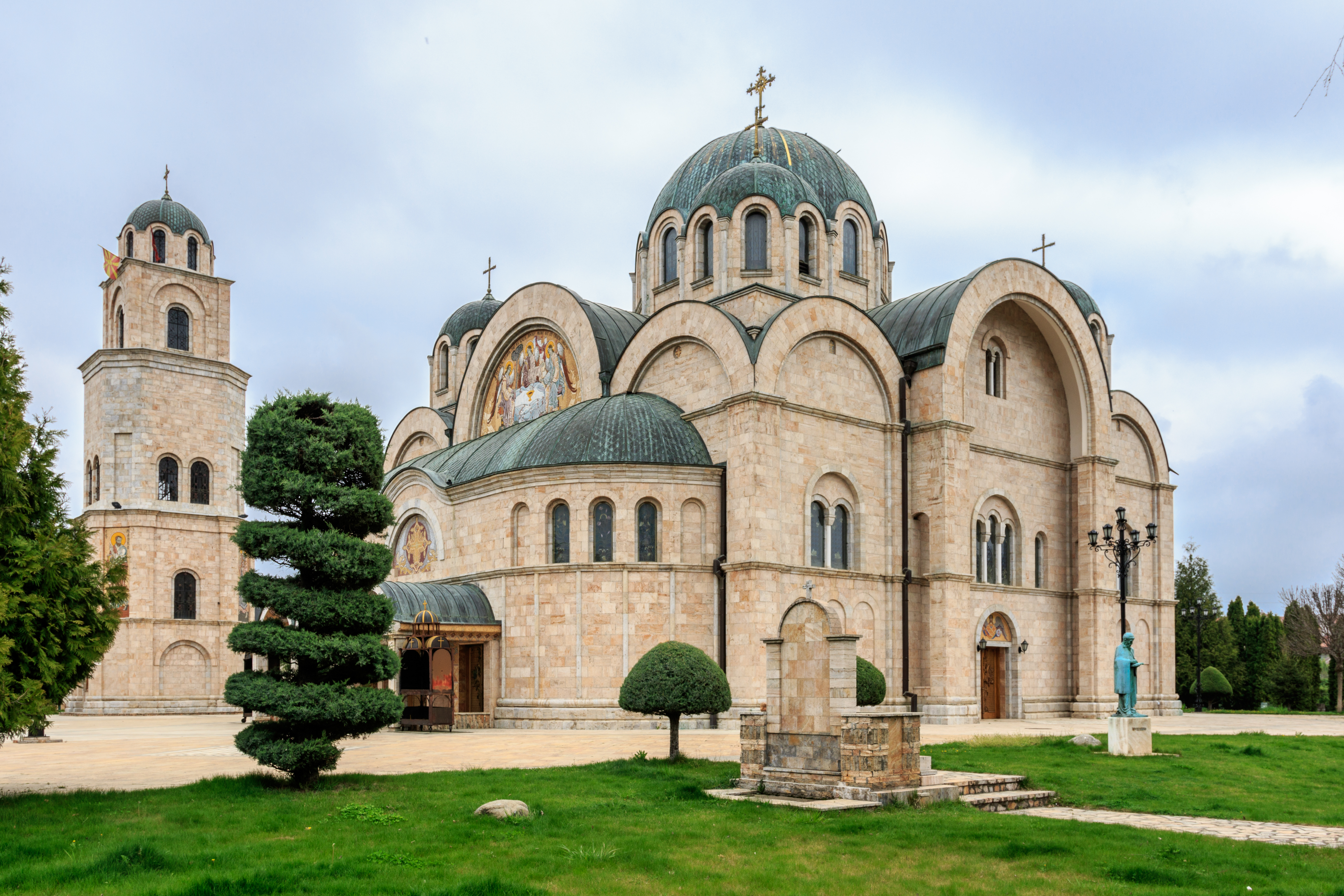
- From the top, View of Radoviš, Radoviš Cross, Holy Trinity Church

- Flag Coat of arms

- Location in North Macedonia
- Coordinates: 41°38′10″N 22°28′0″E
- Country: North Macedonia
- Region: Southeastern
- Municipality: Radoviš

Government
  - Mayor: Ljupche Pochivalec (VMRO-DPMNE)

Area
  - Total: 12 km^{2} (4.6 sq mi)
- Elevation: 380 m (1,250 ft)

Population (2002)
  - Total: 16,223
  - Density: 43.32/km^{2} (112.2/sq mi)
- Time zone: UTC+1 (CET)
  - Summer (DST): UTC+2 (CEST)
- Post codes: 2420, 2421
- Area code: 032 (+389 32)
- Vehicle registration: RA
- Patron saint: Saint Spaso of Radoviš
- Climate: Cfa
- Website: radovis.gov.mk

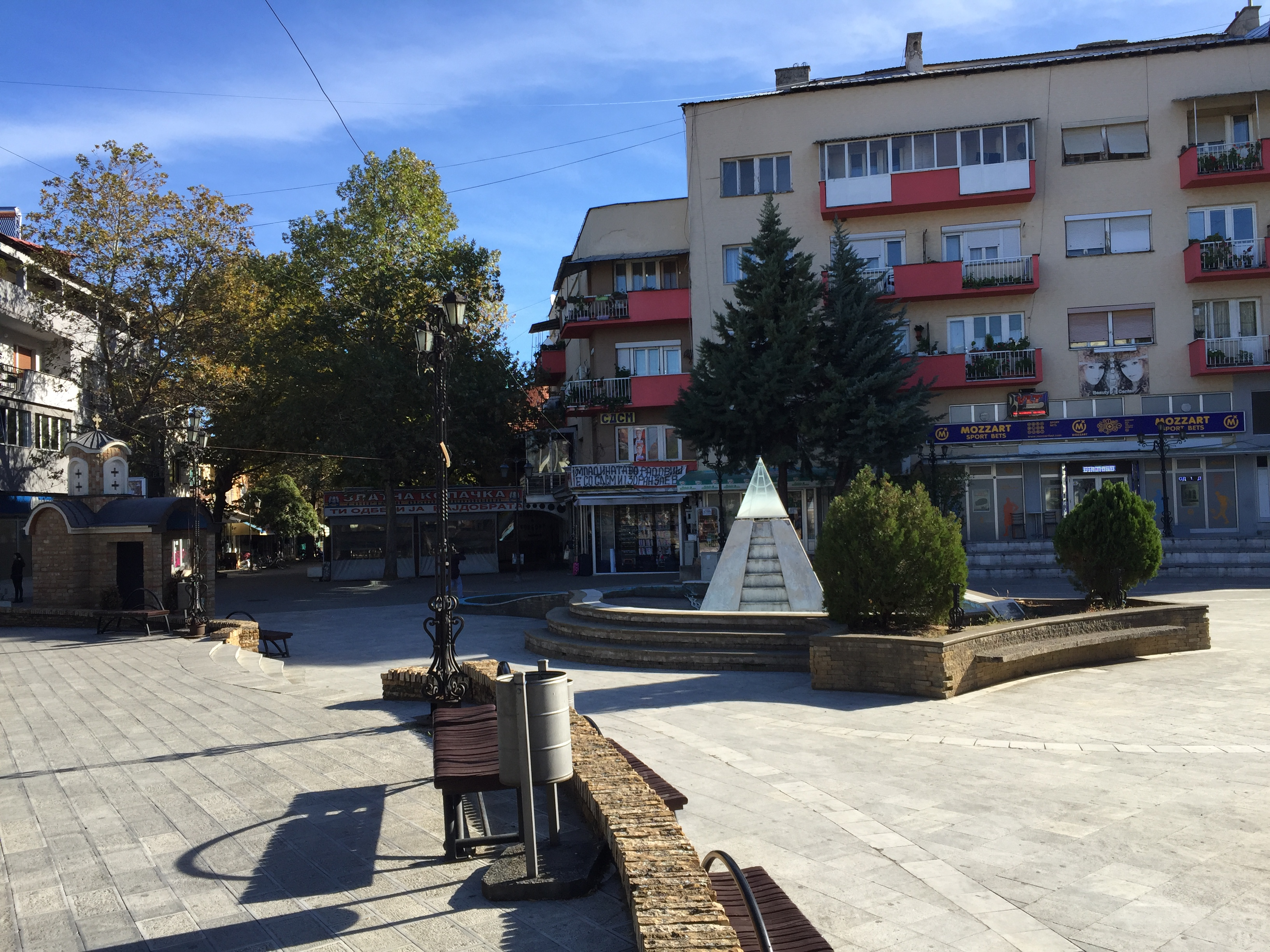
Radoviš Centre

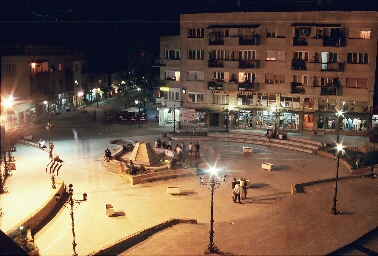
Radoviš

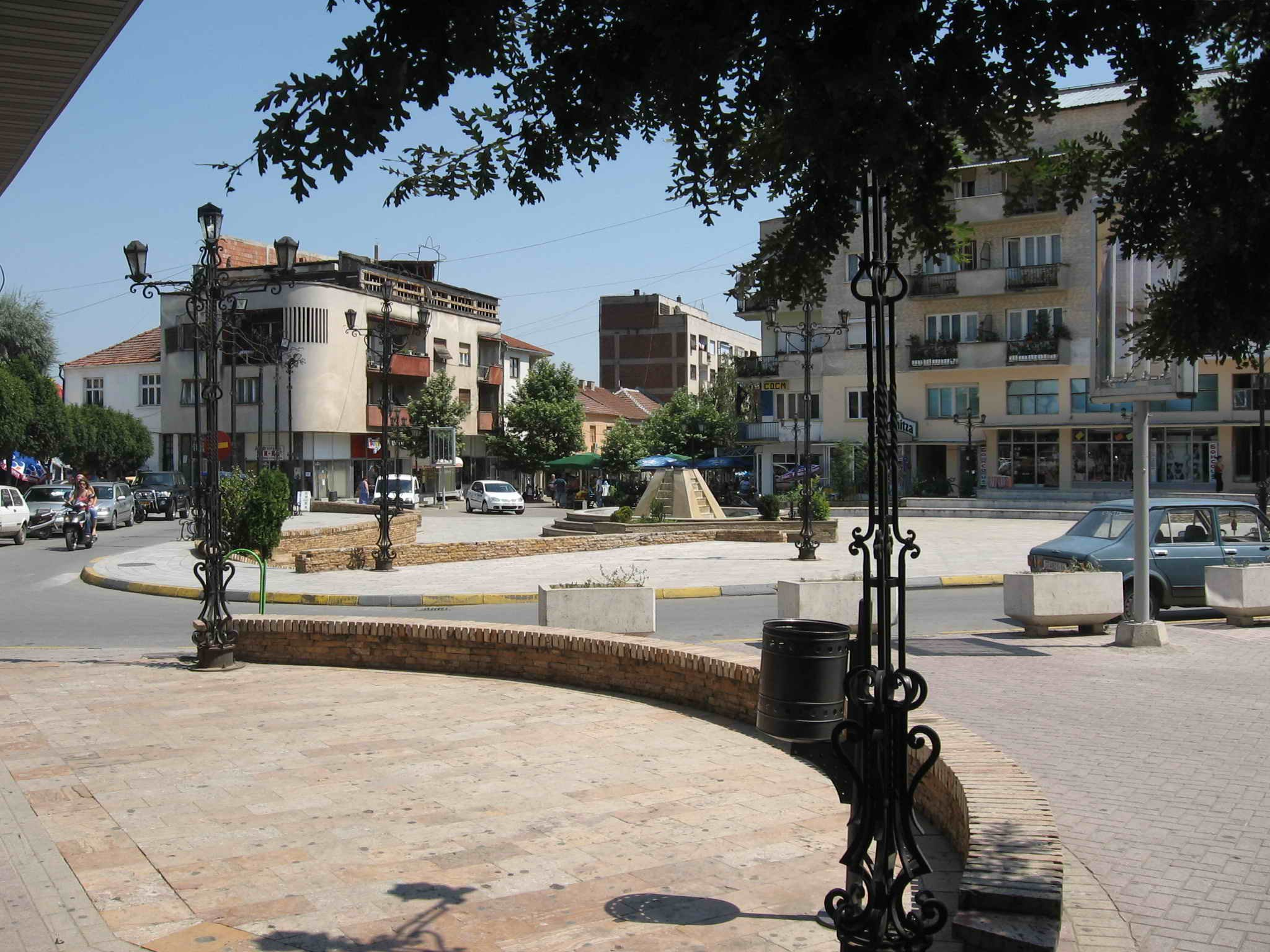
Radoviš

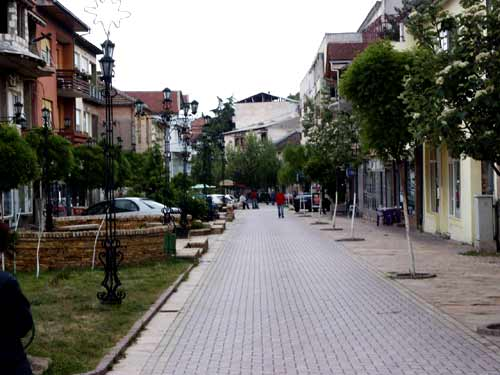
Radoviš

Radoviš (Macedonian: Радовиш [ˈradɔviʃ]) is a city in the southeastern part of North Macedonia. It is the second largest city in the southeastern region. The city is the seat of Radoviš Municipality, which is spread on the bottom of Plačkovica Mountain and the northern part of the Radoviš-Strumica valley. The main road M6 Štip–Radoviš-Strumica is tangentially placed on the township of Radoviš. This road is a main communication route with other parts of the country.

== History ==
The town of Radoviš was mentioned for the first time in 1019 during the reign of the Byzantine King Basil II (which was the name of the town during the Middle Ages). At this time in history, Radoviš is an important center for regional trade, craftsmanship and mining. At that time, the town was located in the North-West of the town's present location, on the banks of the Old river, where we can find traces of several churches, for example St. Archangel church.

In the 14th century, after the withdrawal of the Byzantine Empire, Radoviš found itself in the Serb medieval state. In 1361, the tsar Uroš sojourned in Radoviš. During the Ottoman Empire, in the 17th century under the Kyustendil sanjak, it belonged to the diocese of the Kustendil metropolitan. At that time, the town had 3,000–4,000 inhabitants.

The Medieval period of Radoviš is characterized by the expansion and development of Radoviš and its surroundings. The economical, political and educational histories of the region can attest to this. In the territory of the Municipality of Radoviš are located both explored and unexplored archeological sites, monasteries, and churches all of which are truly a part of a rich heritage of culture monuments. In addition, this territory dates back to prehistoric times and contain artifacts from the Neolithic, Eneolithic, Halsta and the Bronze Ages. In the time of Philip the Second and Alexander the Great, poems about the territory of the Municipality of Radoviš were written. Also, numerous remains date back to Roman times and even earlier. Additional findings include ancient settlements, terms and aqueducts.

During the 19th and 20th centuries Radoviš and surrounding regions, were influenced by the historical events related to the Razlovo, Kresnensko and Ilinden Uprisings along with the events related to the Balkans, First and Second World War influenced the entire micro region. During Turkish hegemony in Macedonia in the 16th century, the micro region was populated by a nomadic Turkish population called the Juruci, an ethnic group that still exists to this day in this part of the world. The documents Kustendilski metropolitan from the 17th century are also called "Radoviš documents". By the end of the 18th century Radoviš was a town surrounded by the old fortress, the remains of which also exist today. The former main road to Strumica from Pomoravje through Kumanovo, Ovce Pole and Radoviško Pole led to Thessaloniki and the Orphan Bay

== Name ==
The Turkish name for the town is Radoviş, relevant during Ottoman rule. The Serbo-Croat name (used 1913–1943) is Radovište (Радовиште).

== Municipality ==
The area of the municipality is 608 km^{2}. Radoviš municipality has 28,244 inhabitants, according to the last census (2002). Population density is 56/km^{2}. It is populated mainly with Macedonians and partly with Turkish minority. In the Municipality of Radoviš ethnic conflicts and intolerance are unknown.

36 villages are also part of the municipality of Radoviš.

== Local government ==
The mayor of Radoviš is elected directly through a local election. The current mayor is Aco Ristov from VMRO-DPMNE. He won the local election in October 2021. The party that won the previous local elections in 2017 was SDSM.

== Climate ==
The climate of Radoviš is moderate Mediterranean-Continental. With hot and dry summers. Winters are characteristic for their coldness, wetness and the snow falls very often. Average annual temperatures range from 12.5 to 13.0 °C in the valley and at the highest parts of the mountain ranges up to 7.5 °C (45 °F). The warmest months are July and August, when the temperatures are usually above 31 °C (88 °F), and often reach 40 °C (104 °F), and the average is 23 °C (73 °F). The coldest month is January with an average temperature of 1.2 °C (34 °F).

The average annual precipitation is 563 mm, with large fluctuations from year to year, but there is a difference between the mountain and the valley. As to the annual sum of sunshine hours, the region has 2326 sunshine hours per year, 6.4 hours per day, and 112 sunny days a year.

== Population and ethnicities ==
According to the census performed in 2002, the population of the city of Radoviš is 16,222 inhabitants, while in the municipality including the villages 28,244 inhabitants.

The ethnic structure of the population living in the city is:

- Macedonians: 13,991 (86.25%)
- Turks: 1,927 (11.88%)
- Romani: 181 (1.12%)
- Serbs: 60 (0.37%)
- Vlachs: 20 (0.12%)
- Albanians: 1 (0.01%)
- Others: 42 (0.26%)

As of 2021, the city of Radoviš has 14. 460 inhabitants and the ethnic composition was the following:

- Macedonians – 10.688
- Turks - 1.597
- Romani _ 239
- Serbs - 23
- Albanians – 14
- Aromanians – 11
- others – 54
- Person without Data - 1.834

== Religion ==
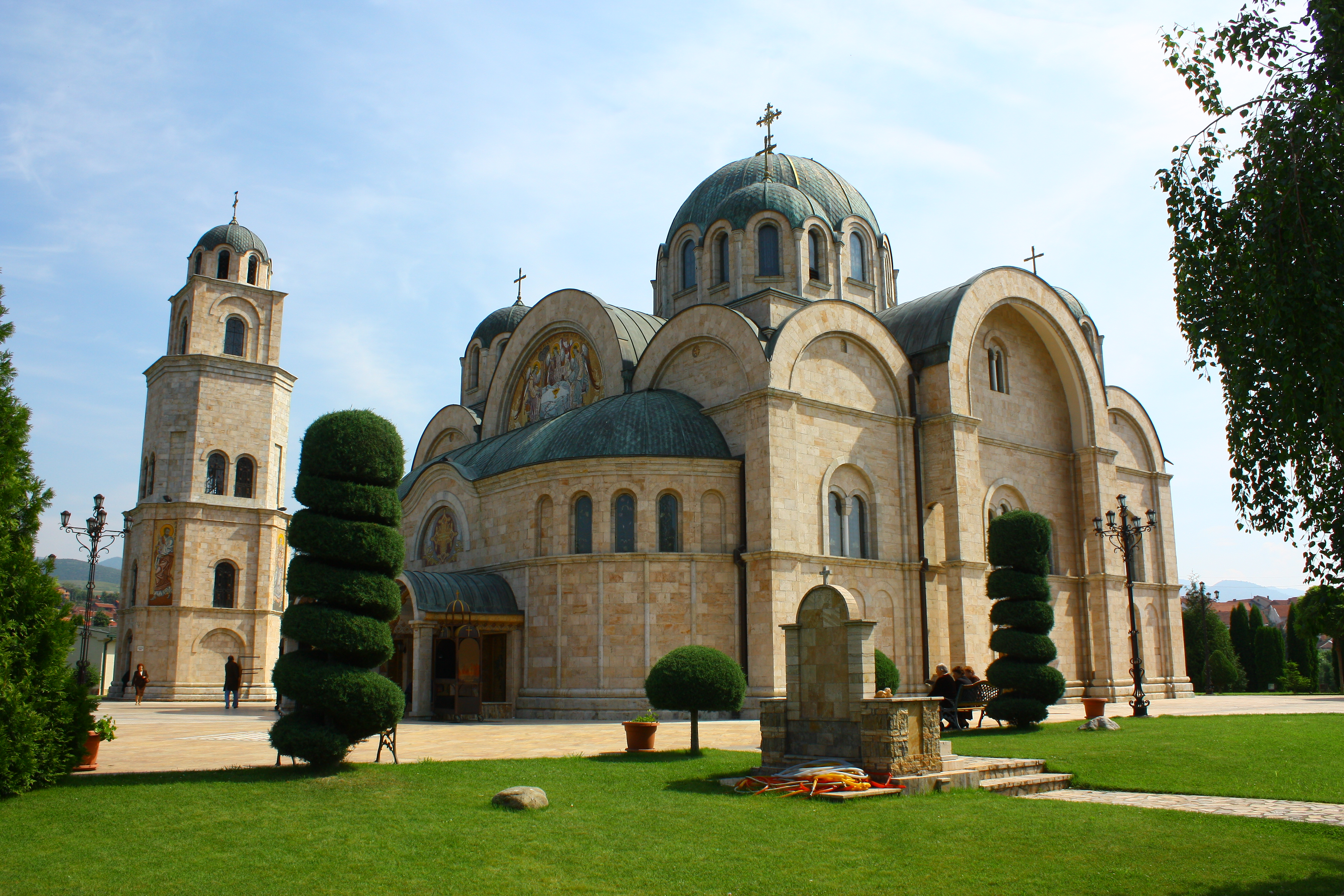
Holy Trinity Macedonian church in Radoviš

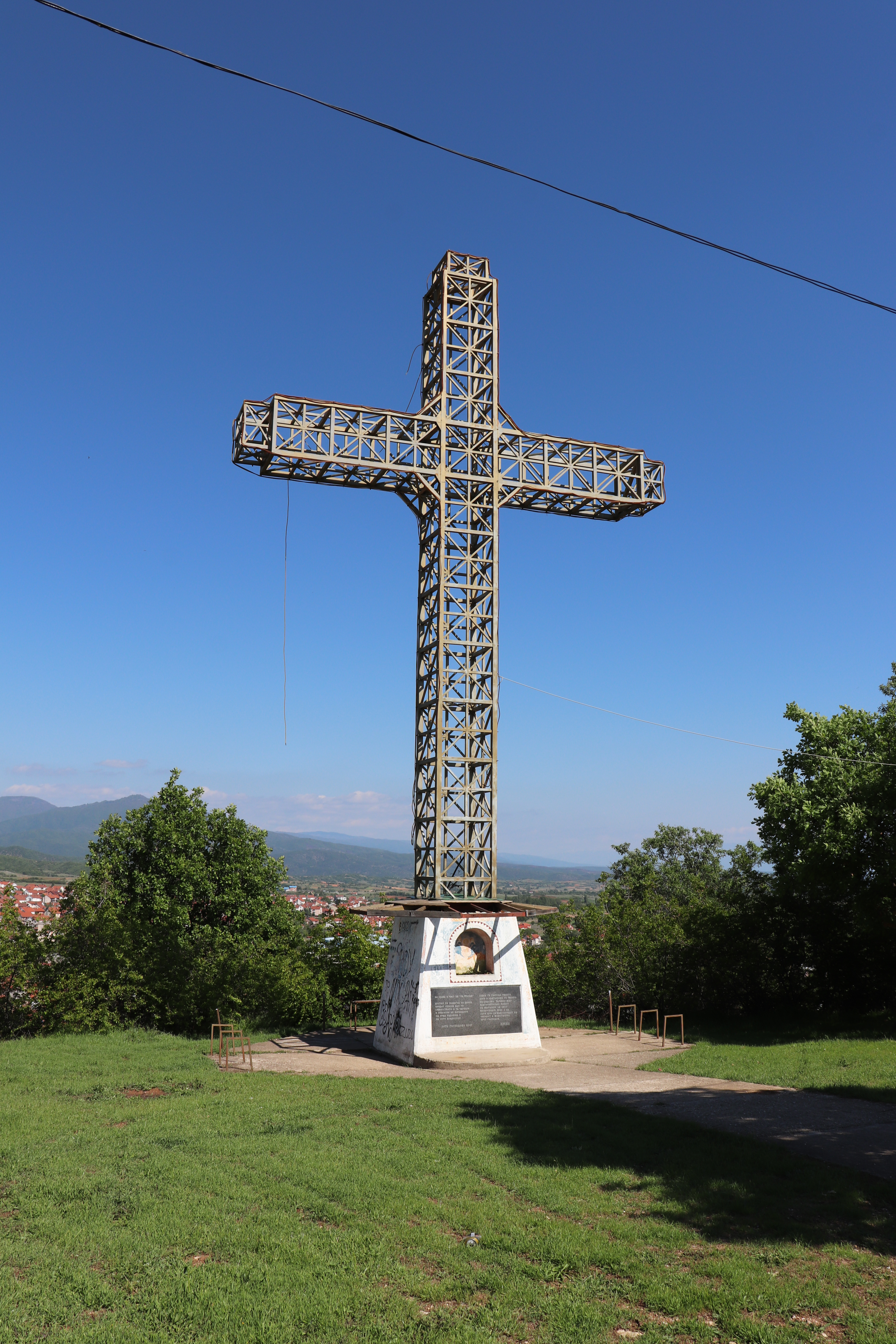
Radoviš Cross

Radoviš is a mainly Macedonian Christian city, with minorities of Protestants and Catholics.

There are three Macedonian Orthodox churches, the new one Holy Trinity, the old one St.Ilija, and St. King Constantine and Queen Elena from the 18th century. There are also Macedonian Christian monasteries such as those of St. Archangel Michael, St. Pantaleon and St. George.

There are also various Protestant churches, such as two Methodist churches, a Baptist church and a Jehovah's Witnesses Kingdom Hall; as well as two mosques.

== Transport ==
Radoviš is linked with the neighbour cities Štip and Strumica by road.

Roads:

The national road M6 passes near Radoviš. It is the only way to arrive in the city. To the north the closest city is Štip (37 km from Radoviš), and to the south Strumica (29 km). Radoviš is 121 km far from the capital Skopje.

Airports:

The closest airport is Skopje International Airport located near the capital Skopje, 108 km north from Radoviš.

Taxis and Buses:

The Radoviš bus station is located on the boulevard Alexander Makedonski, it is 500 meters far from the city center. The bus station connects the city with the capital Skopje, Bitola, Prilep and the neighbour cities. Taxis are all over the city. The price for a drive in the city is about 0.80 euro or 50 Macedonian denars. Taxis can also drive to the villages or to other Macedonian cities.

== Media and communications ==
There is one regional private television channel based in Radoviš - TV Kobra, three cable TV providers - Telekabel, A1 and Telekom, free and paid DVB-T2 (MPEG-4) Television, Internet Providers (Cable, ADSL, WDSL, WiFi) and WiFi hotspots across the city. The two national mobile operators have full 4G coverage.

== Sport and leisure ==
The people in Radoviš, especially its youngest inhabitants, like sports. Favourite sports are Football, Basketball, Handball, Fishing, etc. Radoviš has its own Football club: FK Plačkovica, Handball club: RK Radoviš and Fishing club: Carp-Radoviš. Another football club, FK Detonit Junior, plays in the Macedonian Third Football League. "Lebari" are the supporters of the Radoviš sport clubs. The supporters club "Lebari" (Macedonian: Лебари) was formed in 1991. They generally support all clubs in Radoviš, and mostly wear green and yellow symbols, which are the group colours.

Radoviš has a notable history in competitive wrestling, particularly through its local club, BK Bučim-Radovis , which won the European Club Championship in 1995 and the World Cup Championship in 1996. The city's 25 Maj Sports Center has served as the venue for these final competitions as well as serval international tournaments, including the 1991 Balkan Wrestling Championship (freestyle and Greco-Roman) and the annual "Macedonian Pearl" tournament.

The new sport center Šampion (Macedonian: Спортски Центар и Ресторан Шампион - Радовиш) was built in 1999, and consists of: Olympic swimming pool, small swimming pool, tennis courts, basketball courts, table tennis facility, handball court, soccer fields, gym and a restaurant.

== Schools and education ==
=== Elementary education ===
- OOU Krste Petkov Misirkov - Radoviš with about 1300 students, from 6 to 14 years old.
- OOU Nikola Karev - Radoviš with about 1100 students, from 6 to 14 years old.
- OOU Kiril i Metodij, Oraovica - Radoviš
- OOU Orce Nikolov, Injevo - Radoviš
- OOU Kosta Racin, Podareš - Radoviš

=== Secondary education ===
- SOU Kosta Susinov - Radoviš with about 1200 students from 15 to 18 years old, where students can choose among these programs: Gymnasium, Metallurgy technician, and Electro-technician for Computer Technics and Automatics.

== Economy and industry ==
The economy of Radoviš runs through several activities such as: Mining, Building and Construction, Agriculture, Livestock Farming, Business and Trading, Tourism and Hospitality, Banking, Insurance, Crafts, Services, Transportation and traveling agencies.

The industry in Radoviš consists of several factories such as:

- Bučim (Бучим) - the only active mine in the Municipality of Radoviš and the only mine for copper and gold in North Macedonia. Bučim employs about 500 people. It is one of the most important industrial facility in Radoviš and a driving force of the Radoviš industry and economy. The mine (directly and indirectly) contributed significantly to the initiation of other industrial activities such as the building industry, business, hospitality industry, transport and others.

- Best Food TI - that processes vegetables and fruits

- Mlekara Gjorgievi Radoviš, formerly Kooperant - A company for purchasing and production of milk and dairy products

- Textile & clothing factories

In the metal manufacturing industry the most important capacities are: Metalpromet and Semi

Building and Construction in Radoviš is an important industrial activity:

- TEHNIKA is the largest building company. Besides "Tehnika" there are many other entrepreneurs in the building industry. Their activities are mainly focused toward the individual building of residential housing and building of small industrial objects as well as weekend houses.

Other activities in the municipality of Radoviš are banking, insurance, transportation, travel, taxi-services and hospitality industry.

== People from Radoviš ==
Some notable people born in Radoviš are:

- Aco Karamanov
- Kosta Tsipushev
- Sibel Redzep

== International relations ==
=== Twin towns – Sister cities ===
Radoviš is twinned with:

- Dryanovo, Bulgaria
- Teteven, Bulgaria
- Belišće, Croatia
- Contursi Terme, Italy
- Vaslui, Romania
- Zaprudnya, Russia
- Velika Plana, Serbia
- Aliağa, Turkey
- Çınarcık, Turkey
- Ergene, Tekirdağ, Turkey
- Selçuk, Turkey
- Taşköprü, Turkey
- Yalova, Turkey
- Kamianets-Podilskyi, Ukraine

== Gallery ==
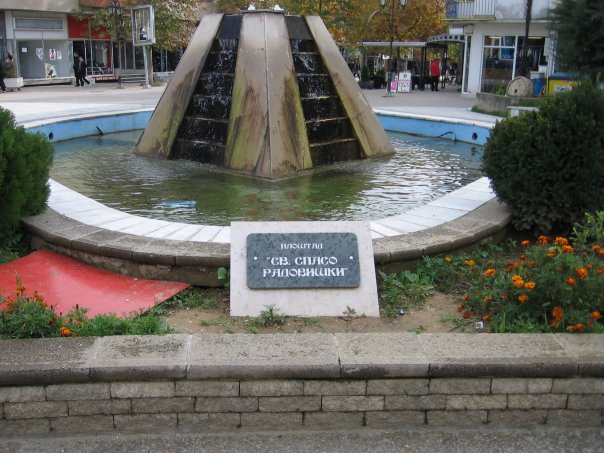
Square St. Spaso

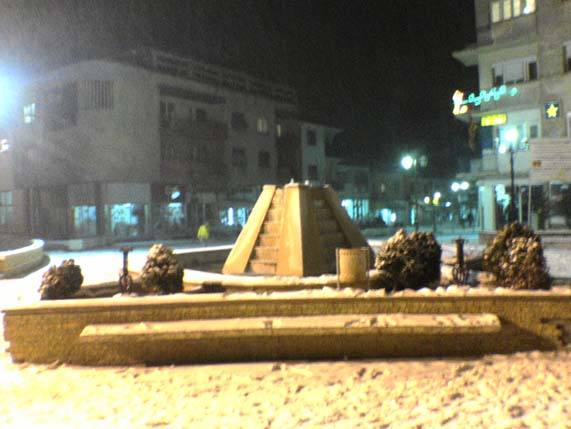
Winter in Radoviš

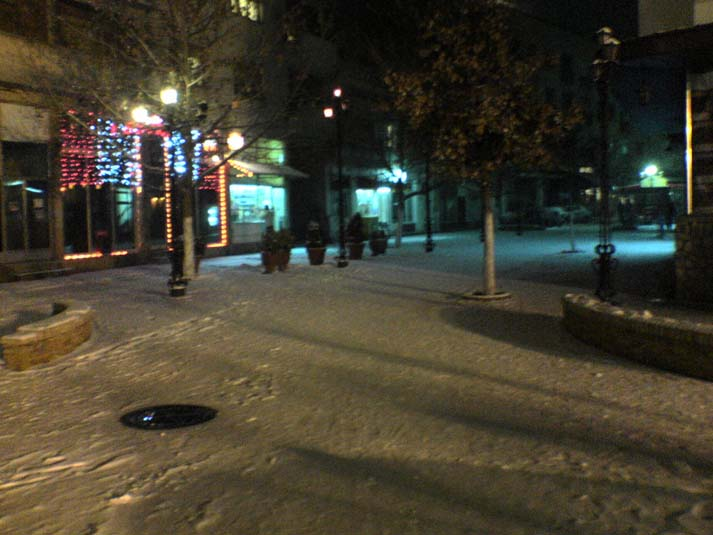
Winter in Radoviš

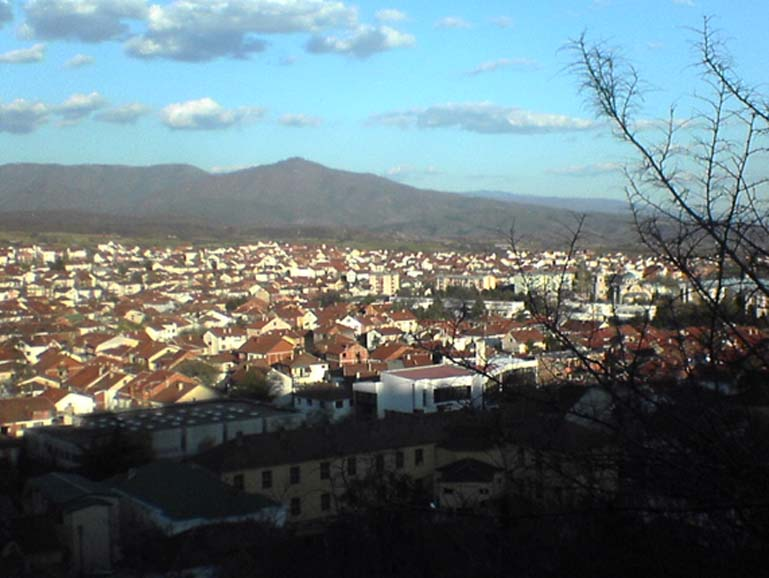
Radoviš

Radoviš' River

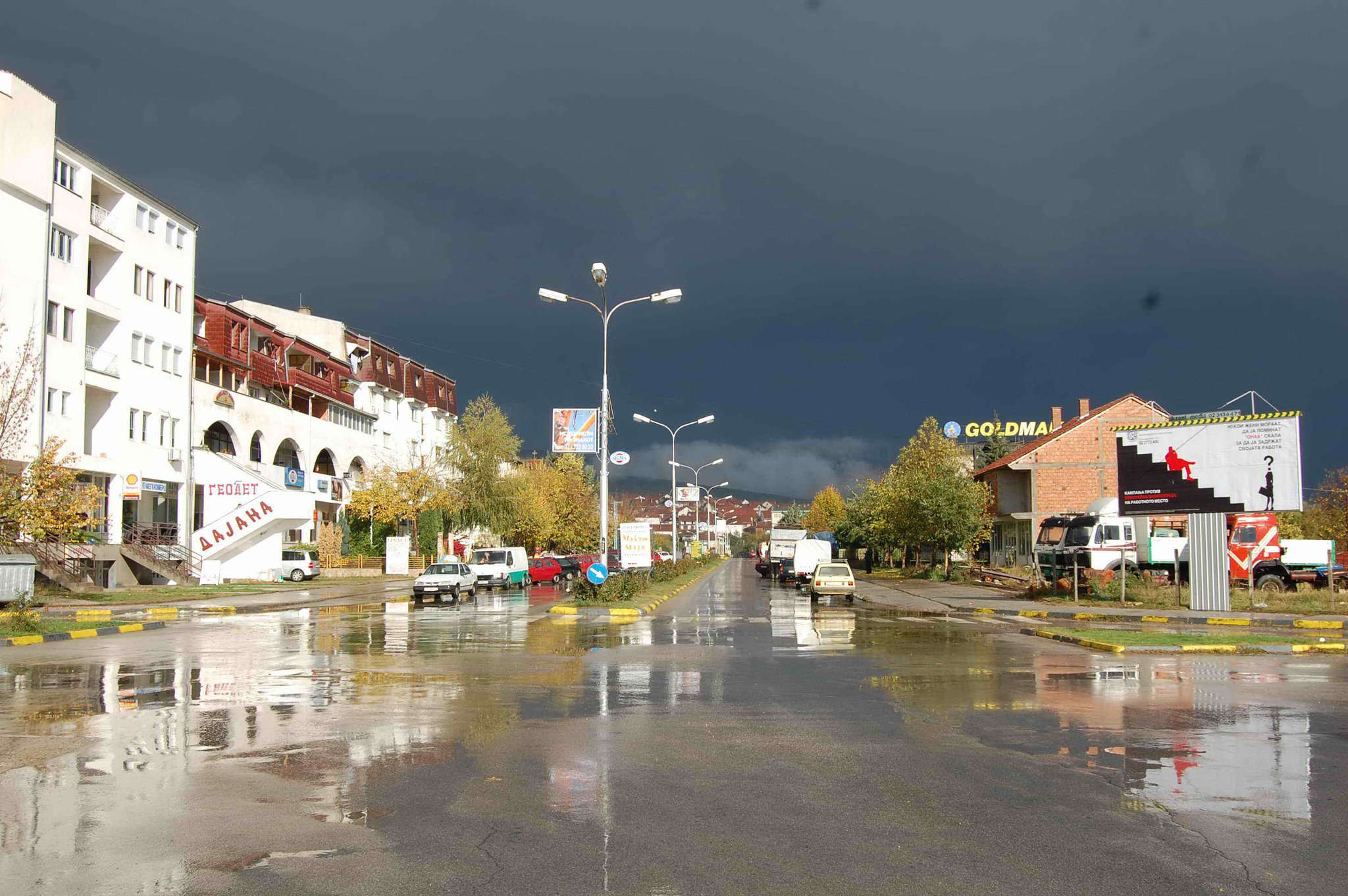
Bul. Alexander the Great

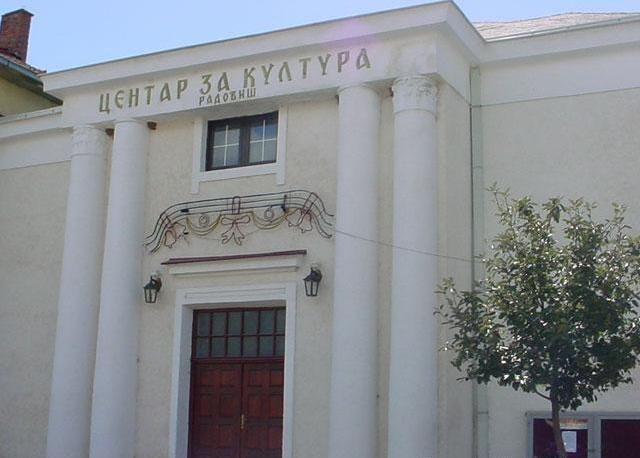
Centre for Culture
