= Oraovica, Radoviš =

Oraovica Ораовица
- Village
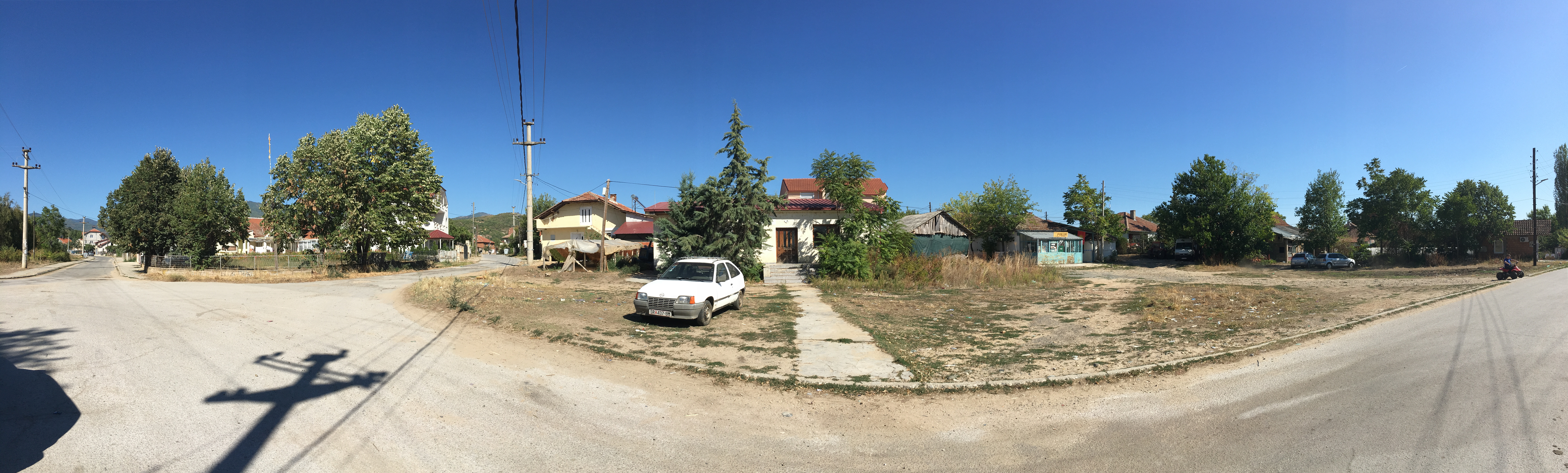
- Panoramic view of the village

- Location within North Macedonia
- Coordinates: 41.625425°N 22.12311°E
- Country: North Macedonia
- Region: Southeastern
- Municipality: Radoviš

Population (2002)
  - Total: 1,720
- Time zone: UTC+1 (CET)
  - Summer (DST): UTC+2 (CEST)

Oraovica (Macedonian: Ораовица) is a village in the municipality of Radoviš, North Macedonia. It is the largest village according to population in the municipality.

== Demographics ==
According to the 2002 census, the village had a total of 1,720 inhabitants. Ethnic groups in the village include:

- Macedonians 1,701
- Turks 12
- Serbs 3
- Romani 2
- Others 2

As of 2021, the village of Oraovica has 1.103 inhabitants and the ethnic composition was the following:

- Macedonians – 1.015
- Turks - 14

Albanians – 1

- Serbs – 1
- others – 1
- Person without Data - 71

== Church ==
- Sv. Atanasij
