= Injevo =

Injevo Ињево
- Village
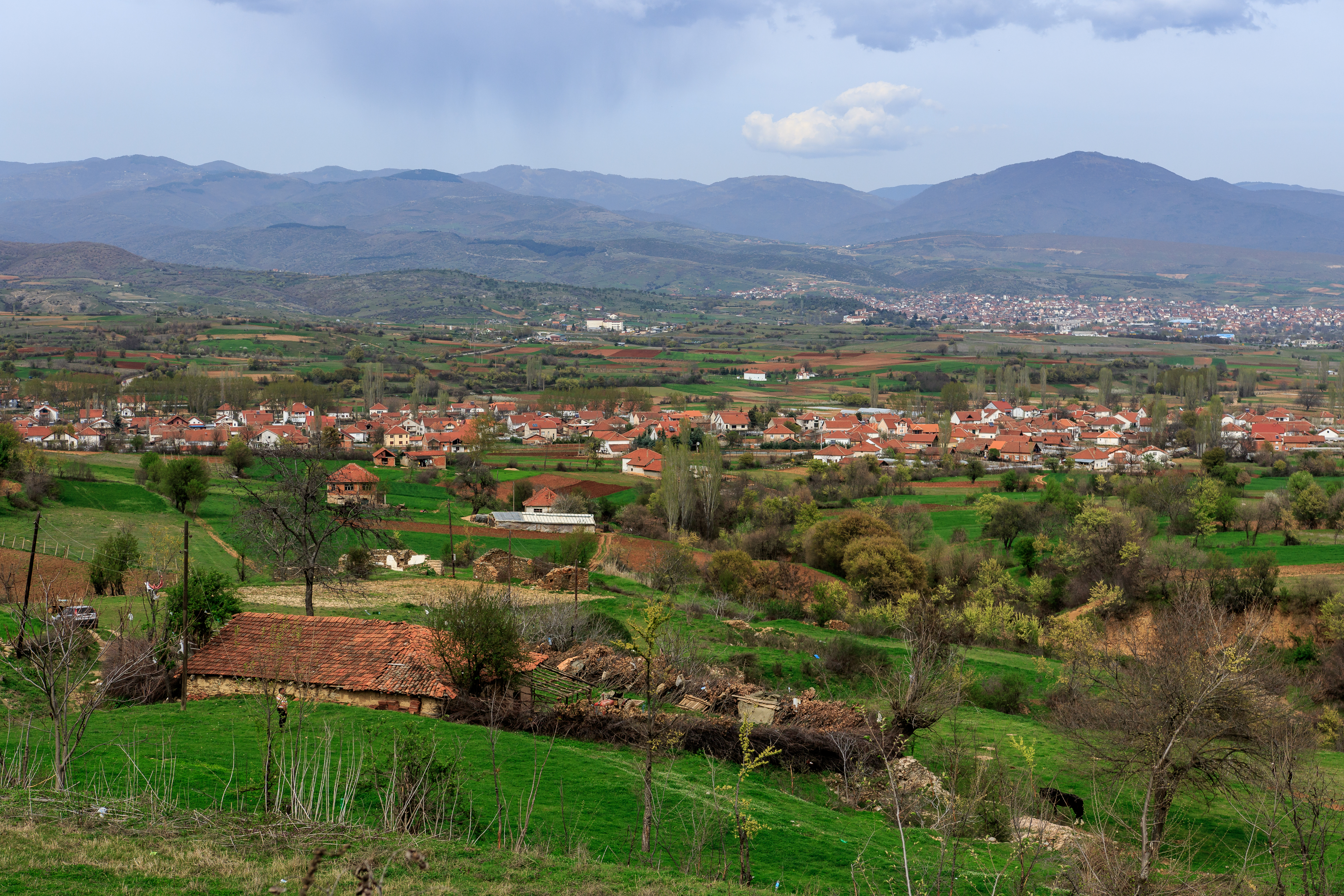
- Panoramic view of the village Injevo

- Location within North Macedonia
- Country: North Macedonia
- Region: Southeastern
- Municipality: Radoviš

Population (2002)
  - Total: 1,624
- Time zone: UTC+1 (CET)
  - Summer (DST): UTC+2 (CEST)
- Website: .

Injevo (Macedonian: Ињево) is a village in the municipality of Radoviš, North Macedonia.

== Demographics ==
According to the 2002 census, the village had a total of 1,624 inhabitants. Ethnic groups in the village include:

- Macedonians 1,623
- Serbs 1

As of 2021, the village of Injevo has 1.139 inhabitants and the ethnic composition was the following:

- Macedonians – 1.087
- Albanians – 1
- others – 2
- Person without Data - 49
