= Voislavci =

Voislavci Воиславци
- Village
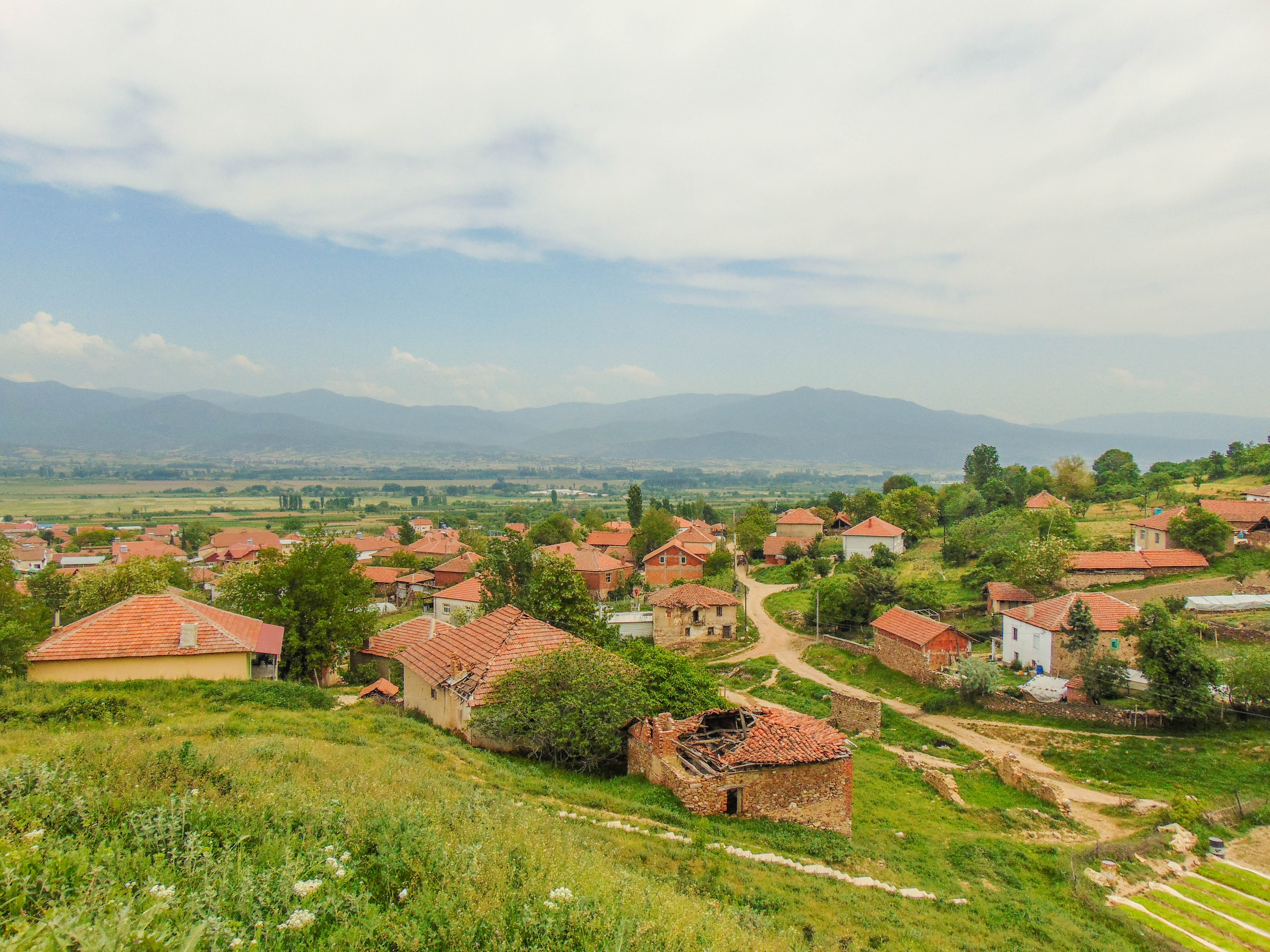
- View of the village

- Location within North Macedonia
- Coordinates: 41.586937°N 22.471518°E
- Country: North Macedonia
- Region: Southeastern
- Municipality: Radoviš

Population (2021)
  - Total: 592
- Time zone: UTC+1 (CET)
  - Summer (DST): UTC+2 (CEST)
- Website: .

Voislavci (Macedonian: Воиславци) is a village in the municipality of Radoviš, North Macedonia.

== Demographics ==
According to the 2002 census, the village had a total of 796 inhabitants. Ethnic groups in the village include:

- Macedonians 796

As of 2021, the village of Vojslavci has 592 inhabitants and the ethnic composition was the following:

- Macedonians – 592
- others – 5
- Person without Data - 37
