= Kaluđerica, Radoviš =

Kalugjerica Калуѓерица
- Village
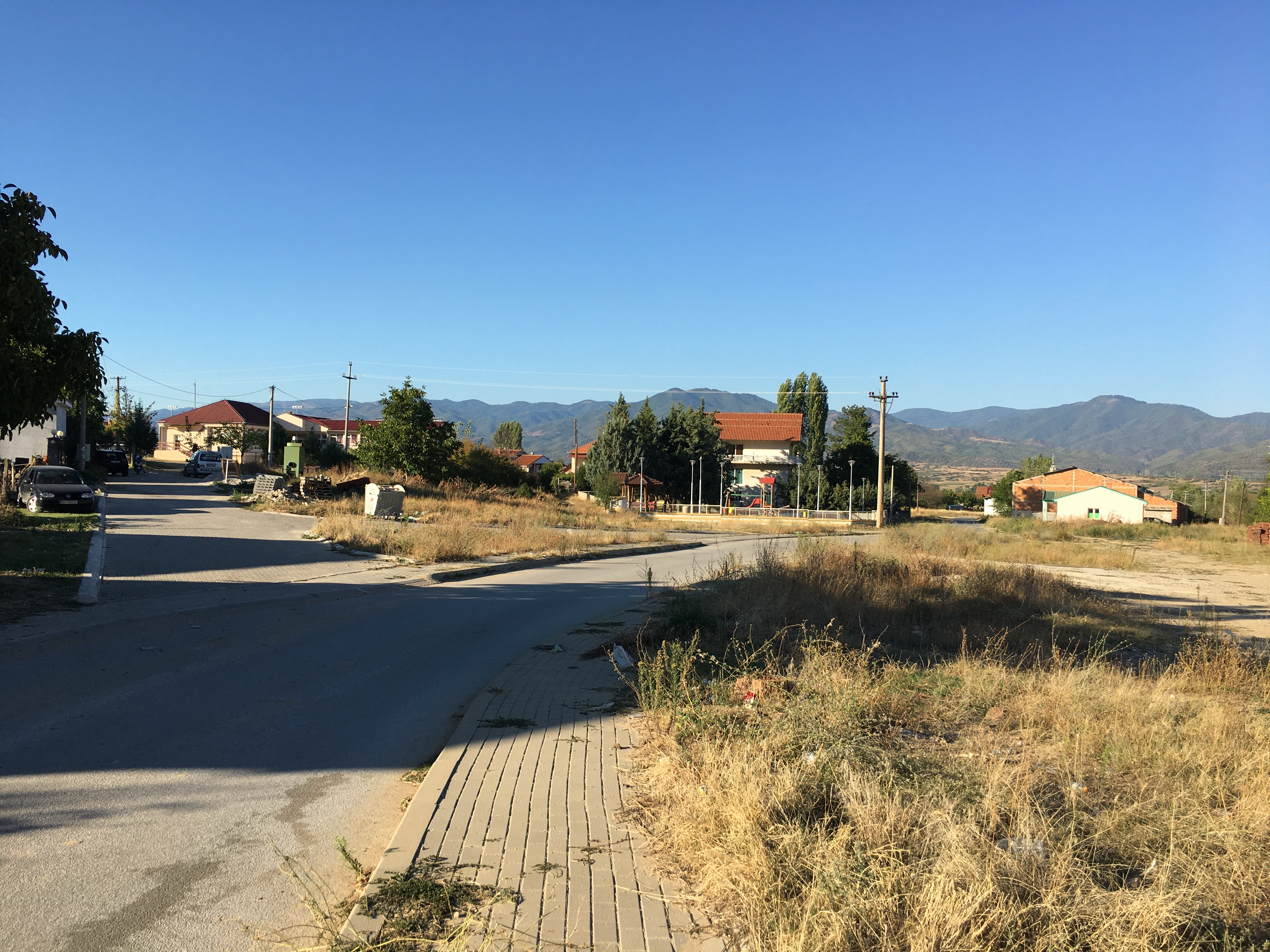
- View in the village

- Location within North Macedonia
- Coordinates: 41.572048°N 22.515781°E
- Country: North Macedonia
- Region: Southeastern
- Municipality: Radoviš

Population (2002)
  - Total: 838
- Time zone: UTC+1 (CET)
  - Summer (DST): UTC+2 (CEST)
- Website: .

Kalugjerica (Macedonian: Калуѓерица) is a village in the municipality of Radoviš, North Macedonia.

== Demographics ==
Аccording to the 2021 census, the village had 651 inhabitants, of whom 416 Macedonians, 123 Turks, 19 Romani and 93 people without data. According to the 2002 census, the village had a total of 838 inhabitants. Ethnic groups in the village include:

- Macedonians 722
- Turks 26
- Serbs 1
- Romani 88
- Others 1

As of 2021, the village of Kalugerica has 651 inhabitants and the ethnic composition was the following:

- Macedonians – 416
- Turks – 123
- Romani – 19
- Person without Data - 93
