= Aco Karamanov =

Poet and partisan

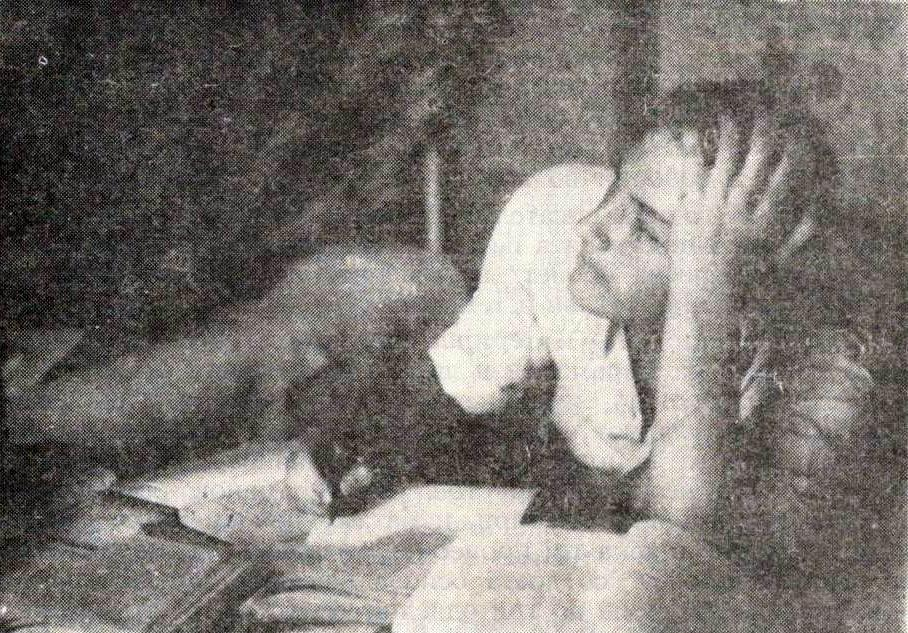
Aco Karamanov writes poetry

Aco Karamanov (Macedonian: Ацо Караманов; Bulgarian: Александър Василев Караманов; January 31, 1927 - October 7, 1944) was a poet and partisan. In North Macedonia he is considered a Macedonian, while in Bulgaria he is considered a Bulgarian.

Karamanov was born in Radoviš, then in the Kingdom of Serbs, Croats and Slovenes. Since the beginning of his education he exhibited affinity to writing. He started writing songs at the early age of 9 years. Between September 5, and October 7, 1944, Karamanov fought against the withdrawing Germans.

This talented writer lived for only 17 years, but his human messages written in poems are left to testify for the war. He is considered one of the founders of contemporary Macedonian literature. His poetry was originally written in Serbo-Croatian and Bulgarian, and was translated into Macedonian after its codification in 1945. According to the Bulgarian literary critic and politician Alexander Yordanov, part of the works of the poet, has not been translated into Macedonian, due to its bulgarophile content.

The town of Radoviš holds each year in his honor a poetry festival "Aco Karamanov Poetry Meetings"
