= Kosta Tsipushev =

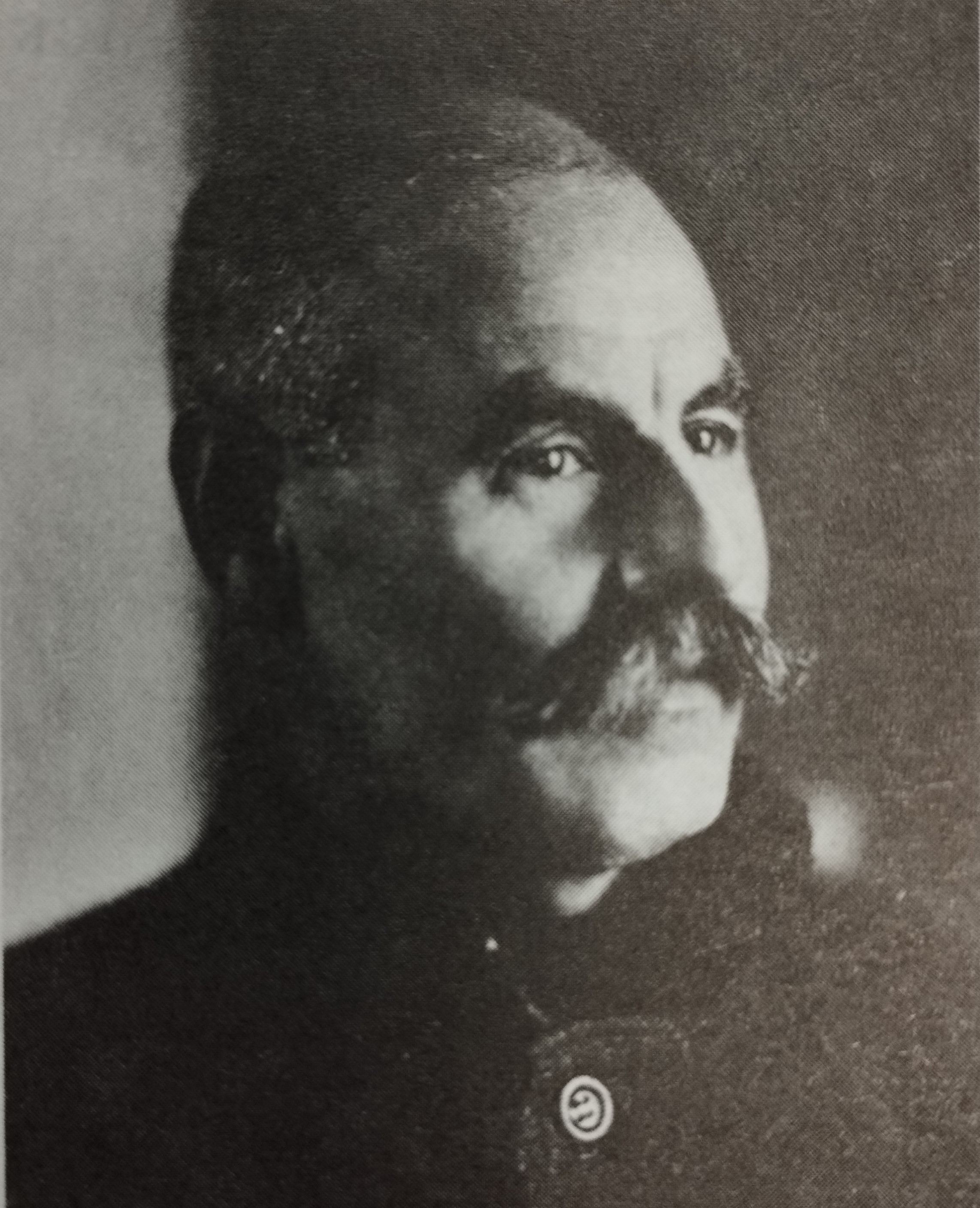
Kotse Tsipushev portrait

Konstantin Dimitrov Tsipushev, also known as Kotse Tsipushev (1877 – 1968; Bulgarian/Macedonian: Коста Ципушев), was a Bulgarian 19th-/20th-century revolutionary. He was among the members of the Bulgarian Macedonian-Adrianople Revolutionary Committees. He was born in 1877 in Radoviš, Ottoman Empire (in modern-day North Macedonia). Kosta graduated from the Bulgarian school in Radovish in 1895 and then the Bulgarian Men's High School of Thessaloniki. In 1899, he began to study in the Sofia University. Later he married the sister of the Internal Macedonian-Adrianople Revolutionary Organization (IMARO) leader Todor Alexandrov and graduated in chemistry in Geneve. Afterwards Tsipushev returned to Radovish and worked there as a teacher, continuing his participation in the activity of IMARO. He was arrested several times by the Ottoman authorities and imprisoned for two years. At that time he worked subsequently as with Gotse Delchev, Dame Gruev, Boris Sarafov and Todor Alexandrov.

During the Balkan Wars his cheta aided the Bulgarian Army. After the wars he continued to work in the Bulgarian administration in Strumitsa, but also as the Internal Macedonian Revolutionary Organization (IMARO) leader in the area. During the First World War he supported the Bulgarian army again and was prominent with his anti - Serbomans activity. At the end of the war Tsipushev was captured by the English troops in the area and delivered to the Serbian authorities as war criminal. Tsipushev was sentenced to death, which sentence was substituted with 20 years prison and as a consequence he spent the next 19 years from his life in different Yugoslav prisons. After his liberation in 1938 he went back to Bulgaria. During Bulgarian annexation of Vardar Banovina between 1941 - 1944 he returned to Macedonia again. However, after 1944 Communist Bulgaria and Communist Yugoslavia began a policy of making Macedonia connecting link for the establishment of new Balkan Federative Republic and stimulating here a development of distinct Slav Macedonian consciousness.

Tsipushev was expelled from Yugoslavia to Bulgaria, but as a concession to the Yugoslavian side, Bulgarian communist authorities agreed also with the recognition of a distinct Macedonian ethnicity as part of the population in the Bulgarian Macedonia. They made an attempt to gain Tsipushev on their side as collaborationist, but he refused. Because he openly opposed the official policy of Macedonization, he was repressed and exiled to the interior of Bulgaria. His memoirs called 19 years in Serbian prisons issued in 1943 were banned and obliterated from the communists. At the end of the 1950s the Bulgarian Communist Party, however repealed its previous decision and adopted a position denying the existence of a “Macedonian” nation.

Afterwards Tsipushev was partially rehabilitated. He died in 1968 in Sofia, Bulgaria. With the fall of Communism his book was issued in Republic of Macedonia in 2003 and reissued in Bulgaria in 2006.

== Sources ==
- Ципушев, К. 19 години в сръбските затвори. Спомени, София, 1943
