= Podares =

Podareš Подареш
- Village
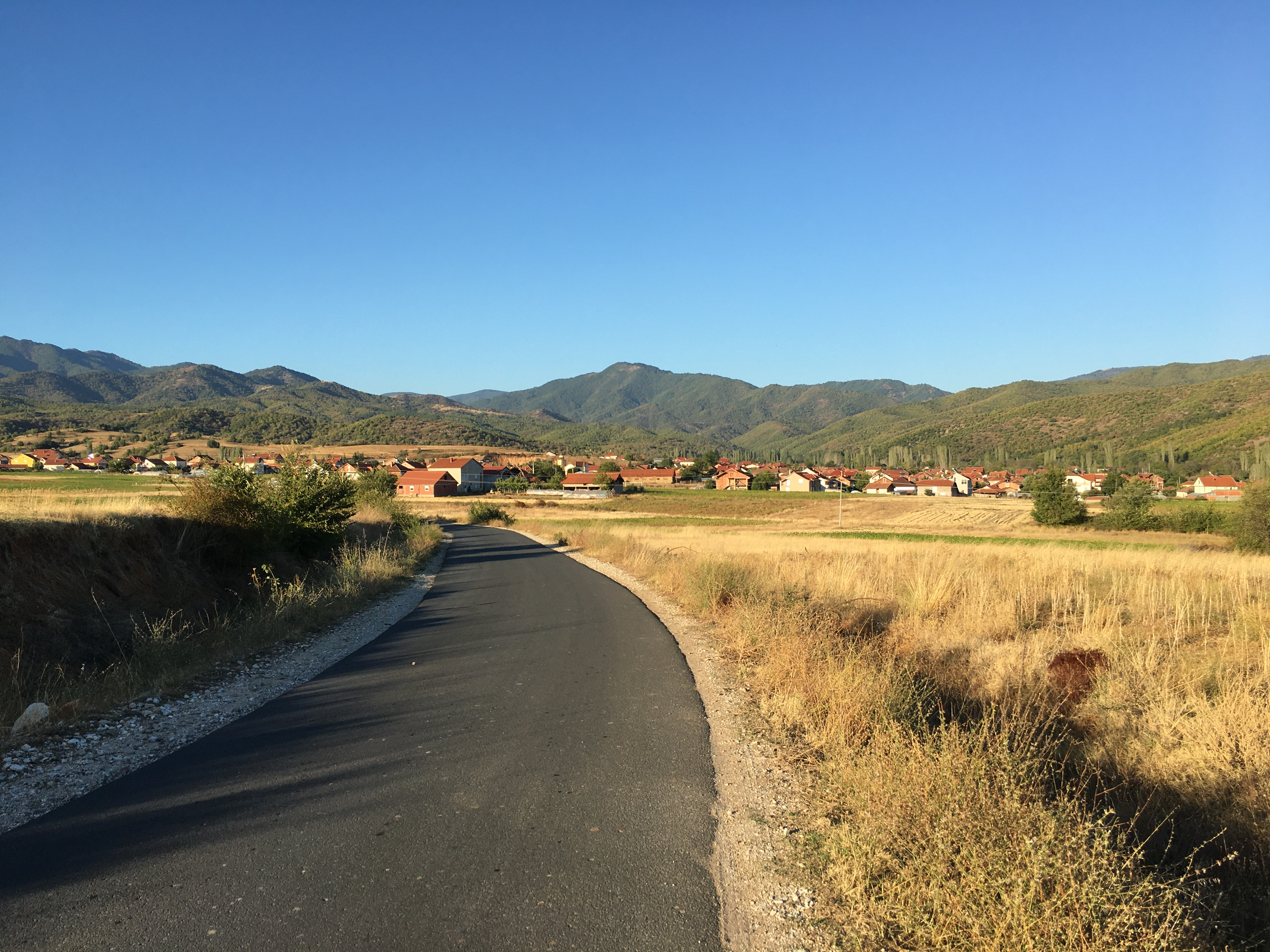
- View of the village

- Location within North Macedonia
- Country: North Macedonia
- Region: Southeastern
- Municipality: Radoviš

Population (2002)
  - Total: 1,527
- Time zone: UTC+1 (CET)
  - Summer (DST): UTC+2 (CEST)
- Website: .

Podareš (Macedonian: Подареш) is a village in the municipality of Radoviš, North Macedonia. It is located 6.9 km east of Radovis. and it used to be a municipality of its own.

== Demographics ==
According to the 2002 census, the village had a total of 1,527 inhabitants. Ethnic groups in the village include:

- Macedonians 1,515
- Turks 11
- Serbs 1

As of 2021, the village of Podaresh has 1.260 inhabitants and the ethnic composition was the following:

- Macedonians – 1.157
- Turks - 12
- Albanians – 1
- Serbs – 1
- others – 9
- Person without Data - 80

== Notable people ==
- Jordan Mitev (Musician)
