= November 1915 =

Month of 1915

<<	November 1915					>>
Su	Mo	Tu	We	Th	Fr	Sa
	1	2	3	4	5	6
7	8	9	10	11	12	13
14	15	16	17	18	19	20
21	22	23	24	25	26	27
28	29	30

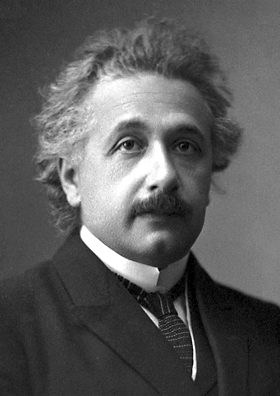
Albert Einstein submitted his paper on general relativity to the Prussian Academy of Sciences.

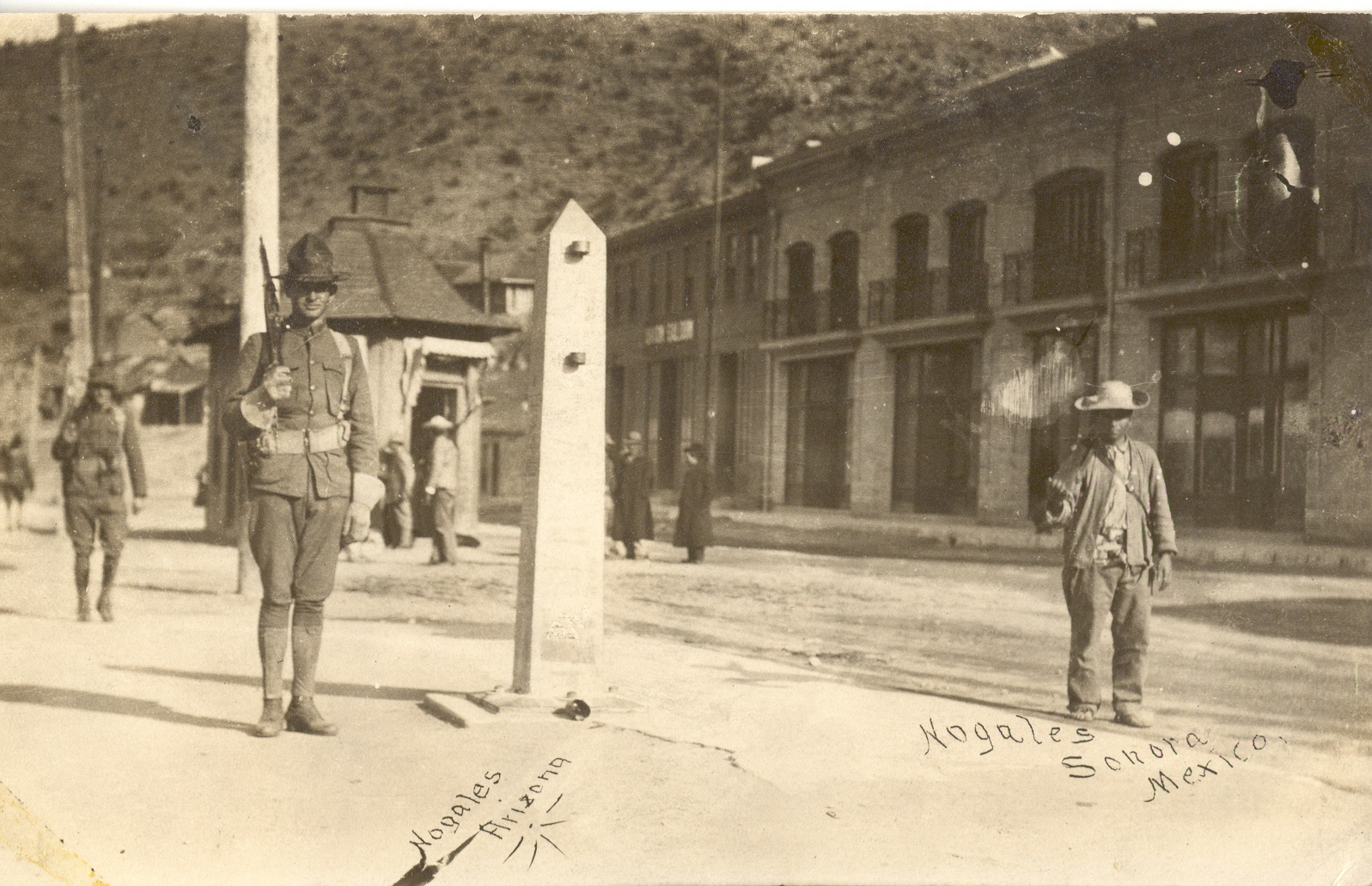
American and Mexican soldiers guarding the border that runs through Ambos Nogales, Arizona following the Battle of Nogales.

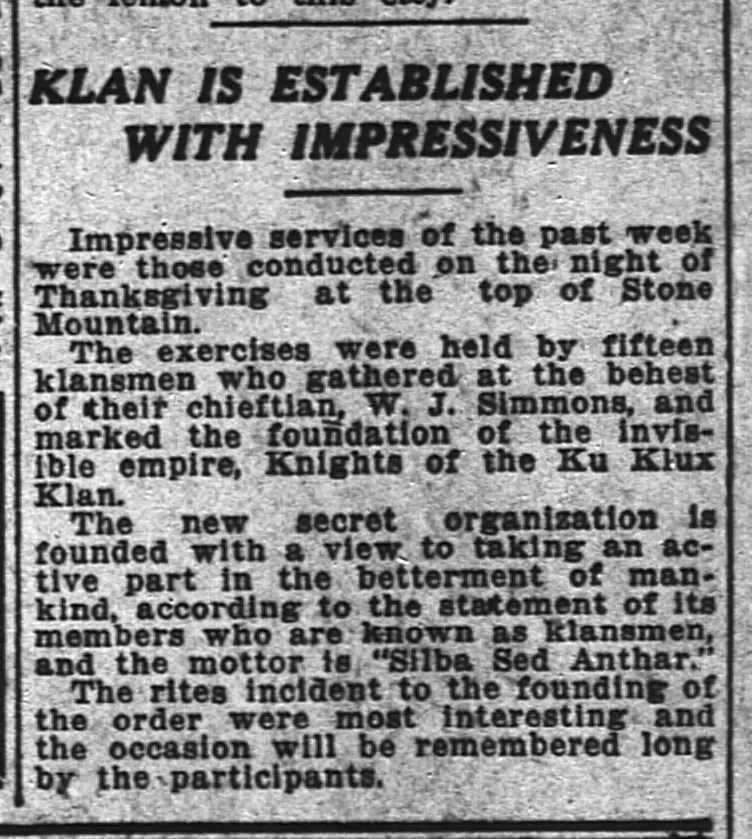
The Atlanta Constitution clipping Nov. 28, 1915, describing the Klan re-establishment atop Stone Mountain, Georgia.

The following events occurred in November 1915:

== November 1, 1915 (Monday) ==
- Second Battle of Agua Prieta — Mexican revolutionary leader Pancho Villa and his soldiers clashed with troops under command of future Mexican president Plutarco Elías Calles at Agua Prieta, Sonora, Mexico. Despite having a force less than half the size of Villa's force of 15,000, Calles was able to defeat Villa and help Mexican leader Venustiano Carranza gain control of northern Mexico.
- The Royal Naval Air Service adopted the same roundel as used by the Royal Flying Corps and discontinued the use of the Union Jack on fuselage sides.
- Imperial Trans-Antarctic Expedition — Expedition leader Ernest Shackleton called off a march to Paulet Island as deteriorating ice condition made the surface too rough to effectively maneuver boats and supplies. The expedition returned to the wrecked Endurance which had been slowly sinking for seven days.
- The cornerstone was laid for Webster Hall at Loretto College in Webster Groves, Missouri, the first Catholic women's college west of the Mississippi River. The college was renamed to Webster College in 1924 and began accepting male students in 1962. The college became Webster University in 1983, and used the opening of Webster Hall to mark its centennial.
- Several rails lines were extended in Japan, including the Ōito Line in the Nagano Prefecture with station Shimauchi serving the line, the Shin'etsu Main Line in the Niigata Prefecture with station Jōoka serving the line, and the Rikuu East Line in the Yamagata Prefecture with station Nagasawa serving the line.
- The Asquith railway station opened to serve the Main North Line in Asquith, New South Wales, Australia.
- Born: Marion Eugene Carl, American marine air officer, test pilot for the first jet engine planes at Naval Air Station Patuxent River, two-time recipient of the Navy Cross, four Legion of Merits, five Distinguished Flying Crosses, and 14 Air Medals; in Hubbard, Oregon, United States (d. 1998)
- Died: Lewis Waller, 54, English actor, best known for his collaborations with Theatre Royal Haymarket, including the premier lead role in the Oscar Wilde play An Ideal Husband; died of pneumonia (b. 1860)

== November 2, 1915 (Tuesday) ==
- Battle of Krivolak — French forces in Serbian-controlled Vardar Macedonia were able to throw two flying bridges over Vardar River to supply new defenses against Bulgarian attack.
- Shinano Railway further extended the Ōito Line in the Nagano Prefecture, Japan with stations Tokiwa-Kutsukake and Tokiwa serving the line.
- The association football club Makassar was established in Makassar, Dutch East Indies (now Indonesia), and remains one of the oldest operating football clubs in Southeast Asia.
- Died:
  - Vojislav Tankosić, 35, Serbian army officer, member of the Black Hand and conspiracy to assassinate Archduke Franz Ferdinand of Austria; died of his wounds during World War I (b. 1880)
  - Isaac Rice, 65, German-born American inventor and entrepreneur, founder of the modern submarine manufacturer General Dynamics Electric Boat (b. 1850)

== November 3, 1915 (Wednesday) ==
- Third Battle of the Isonzo — Austria-Hungary defeated Italy at the Isonzo River (now Soča) in Slovenia), Casualties were heavy for Austria-Hungary with 40,900, including 9,000 dead. However, Italy's were worse at 67,100, including 11,000 dead.
- Battle of Krivolak — A French detachment defending the flying bridges over Vardar River in Vardar Macedonia mowed down soldiers from three Bulgarian brigades as they stormed the bridges, resulting in 3,000 casualties. On the same day, another French force captured the villages of Dorlobos and Kajali.
- Royal Naval Air Service Flight Sub-Lieutenant Fowler made the first British take-off of an aircraft with a conventional, wheeled undercarriage from a ship when he flew a Bristol Scout from HMS Vindex.
- The Keisei Main Line was extended in the Chiba Prefecture, Japan, with stations Keisei Nakayama and Shin-Yawata serving the line.
- The rural municipality of St. Paul in the Canadian province of Manitoba was divided into East St. Paul and West St. Paul.
- Died:
  - Bernardino Verro, 49, Italian socialist politician, former leader of the Fasci Siciliani (Sicilian Workers Leagues); killed by the Sicilian Mafia (b. 1866)
  - George Miller Sternberg, 77, American army medical officer, known for his research into bacteria that cause malaria, tuberculosis, and typhoid fever, author of Manual of Bacteriology (b. 1838)

== November 4, 1915 (Thursday) ==
- Third Battle of Artois — The Allied offensive to recapture French territory from the Germans on the Western Front ended in failure. France lost 48,320 casualties while Great Britain lost 61,713. German casualties were around 51,100.
- German submarine SM U-38 sunk French troopship SS Le Calvados off the coast of Algeria, killing 740 of the 800 on board.
- Battle of Krivolak — The French abandoned Karahojali, Macedonia due to rough terrain making artillery defenses useless and instead advanced towards Veles to attack the Bulgarian rear.
- Battle of Banjo — British colonial forces laid siege to a German mountain stronghold near Banjo, Kamerun.
- German submarine SM UC-8 ran aground on Terschelling, Friesland, Netherlands where she was subsequently interned and taken into Royal Netherlands Navy service as HNLMS M-1.
- Residents in the Dominion of Newfoundland voted in favor of prohibiting the sales and distribution of alcohol with 24,956 voting in favor through plebiscite. Prohibition was introduced on January 1, 1917, and remained in force until 1924.
- Born:
  - Wee Kim Wee, Singaporean state leader, 4th President of Singapore; in Singapore, Straits Settlements (present-day Singapore) (d. 2005)
  - Ismail Abdul Rahman, Malaysian politician, cabinet minister for the Abdul Razak Hussein administration; in Johor Bahru, British Malaysia (present-day Malaysia) (d. 1973)

== November 5, 1915 (Friday) ==
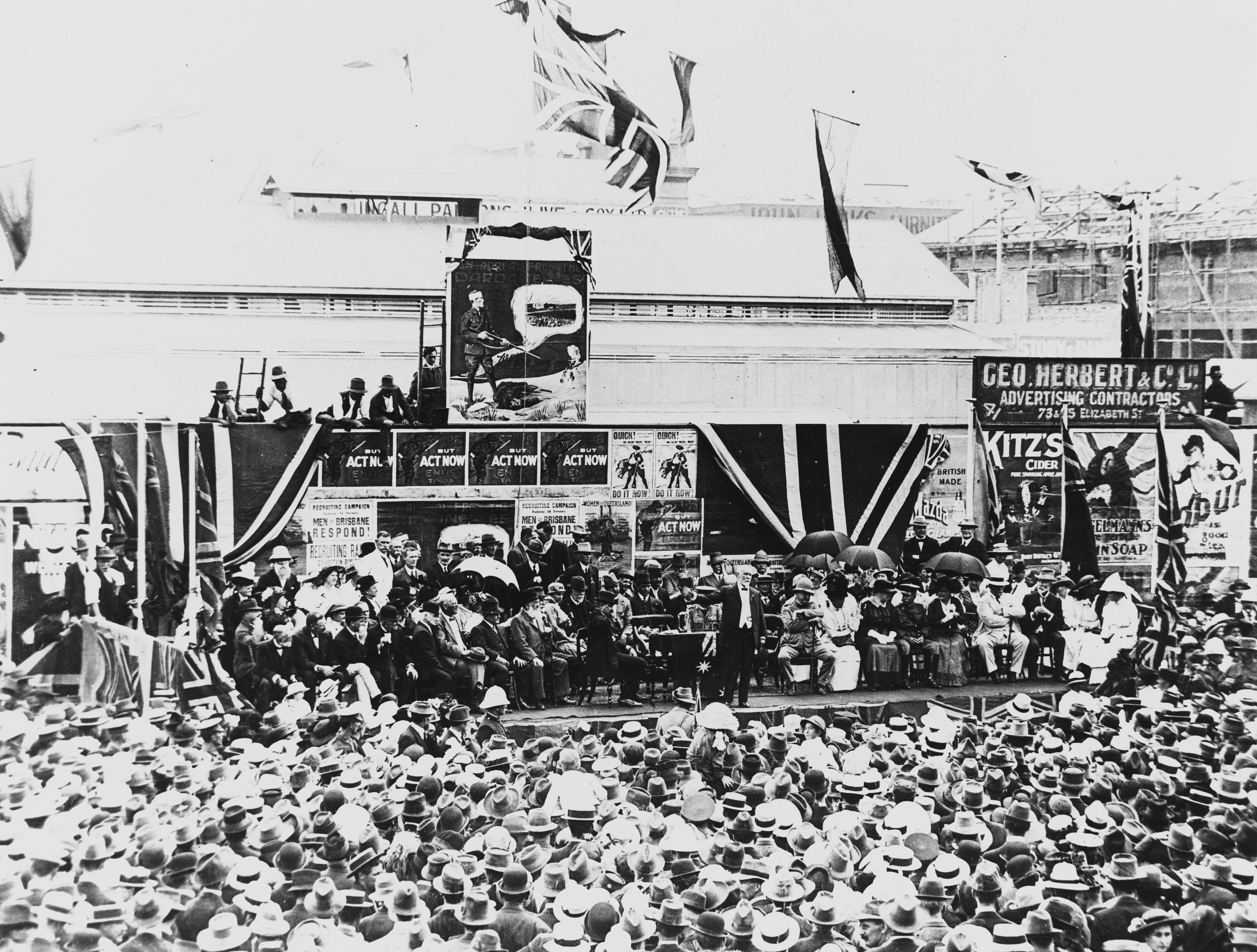
Dungarees recruiting campaign, November 1915

- Battle of Krivolak — The French captured the towns of Kamen Dol, Debrista in Vardar Macedonia and occupied the Gradsko rail station.
- Battle of Banjo — After two days of delay due to bad weather and ammo shortages, British forces launched a final assault on the German mountain fort near Banjo, Kamerun.
- British armed boarding steamer Tara was torpedoed and sunk in the Mediterranean Sea off Sollum by German submarine SM U-35 with the loss of 12 lives.
- British cargo ship Buresk was shelled and sunk in the Mediterranean Sea 30 nautical miles (56 km) northwest of Algeria by German submarine SM U-38, with her crew surviving.
- The No. 27 Squadron of the Royal Flying Corps was established at the Hounslow Heath Aerodrome in London.
- The March of the Dungarees, the second Australian armed forces recruitment campaign known as the snowball marches, was organized across Australia to stem waning interest of the war effort due to the disastrous Gallipoli campaign.
- The Casablanca Fair officially closed in Casablanca.
- The association football club União de Marechal Hermes was established in Rio de Janeiro as a sports club before becoming exclusive to association football in 2000.
- The student newspaper The Daily Eastern News was published for the student body of Eastern Illinois University.
- Born:
  - Booker T. Whatley, American agricultural scientist, developed regenerative agriculture through Tuskegee University; in Calhoun County, Alabama, United States (d. 2005)
  - George H. Cannon, American marine, first U.S. Marine during World War II to receive the Medal of Honor; in Webster Groves, Missouri, United States (killed in action at Midway Island, 1941)
  - Julian Ewell, American army officer, commander of the 9th Infantry Division and Second Field Force during the Vietnam War, recipient of the Legion of Merit, Air Medal, Silver Star, Distinguished Service Cross and Distinguished Service Medal; in Stillwater, Oklahoma, United States (d. 2009)

== November 6, 1915 (Saturday) ==
- Second Battle of Champagne — The battle at Champagne, France officially ended as French groups halted action during the five-week battle of attrition ordered by General Joseph Joffre for the coming winter. French casualties were 145,000 men, while the Germans had 72,500 (although some historians put the German casualty number higher at 97,000).
- Battle of Krivolak — Bulgarian forces repelled attacking French forces south of Kosturino.
- Battle of Banjo — The British captured the German mountain fort near Banjo, Kamerun with a loss of 50 casualties. Much of the German garrison had deserted, with remaining troops sustaining 27 casualties, including the fort commander.
- Hubert Loutsch became the 10th Prime Minister of Luxembourg, succeeding Mathias Mongenast who had only served 25 days.
- British submarine HMS E20 was torpedoed and sunk in the Sea of Marmara by German sub SM UB-14 with the loss of 21 of her 30 crew.
- German submarine SM U-35 attacked two Egyptian coastguard boats off the coast of Libya, sinking one and damaging another, and capturing over 70 survivors.
- The United States Navy armored cruiser USS North Carolina became the first warship to launch an aircraft using a catapult, launching a Curtiss AB-2 flying boat piloted by Lieutenant Commander Henry Mustin over her stern.
- Russian cruiser Chervona Ukraina was launched at the Russud Dockyard in Nikolaev, Russian Empire as part of the Black Sea Fleet but the October Revolution in 1917 delayed its complete construction. The new Soviet regime completed the ship and it would gain its most distinguished service during World War II.
- British minesweeper HMS Arabis was launched at D. and W. Henderson and Company in Glasgow and saw brief service before it was sunk next year at the Battle of Dogger Bank.
- The Nicholson Cutoff rail segment and the Tunkhannock Viaduct bridge were completed and opened for the Sunbury rail line in Nicholson, Pennsylvania.

== November 7, 1915 (Sunday) ==
- Battle of Krivolak — The French failed to capture an important Bulgarian stronghold located at a monastery in the Vardar Macedonia region.
- French passenger ship France IV was sunk in the Mediterranean Sea 85 nautical miles (157 km) southwest of Sardinia, Italy by German submarine SM U-38, with her crew surviving.
- German cruiser SMS Undine was torpedoed and sunk in the Baltic Sea 20 nautical miles (37 km) south of Scania, Sweden by Royal Navy submarine HMS E19.
- British battleship Albemarle was caught in a heavy storm off Pentland Firth while on the way to the Mediterranean Sea. The ship was hit on the bow by two large waves, resulting in three crew dead and 24 injured (two died later of their injuries). The wave impacts also flooded the main gun turret and forward decks, and damaged the forebridge. The ship rendezvoused with Hibernia the following day and was escorted to Scapa Flow where repairs were made and the injured crew were transferred to a hospital ship.
- American businessman Walter M. Geddes, who was working in Aleppo during the Armenian genocide, committed suicide by shooting himself in his hotel room. Geddes had been recording incidents of Ottoman atrocities carried out against Armenians from his arrival on September 16 and passing them on to American consul, but informed American diplomat George Horton a few days before he had been traumatized by the events he witnessed.
- The Imperial German Army established the 108th and 109th Infantry Divisions.
- The No. 28 and No. 29 Squadrons of the Royal Flying Corps were established.
- Gaelic football club Wexford beat Kerry 2-4 and 2–1 at the All-Ireland Senior Football Championship Final in Croke Park, Dublin with 27,000 spectators attending. It was the first of four championship titles Wexford would win in the 1910s.
- Italian rider Gaetano Belloni won the 11th Giro di Lombardia bicycle race, in what would be the first of three wins in that racing competition.
- Mary Pickford starred in the leading role in the first film adaptation of the opera Madama Butterfly, directed by Sidney Olcott. According to The New York Times, Pickford and Olcott clashed on set, with Olcott claiming Pickford was "too Americanized to play a Japanese".
- Cardinal John Murphy Farley dedicated the St. Lucy Church in New York City. The church closed when the parish merged with St. Ann Church in 2015.
- Bishop Philip Joseph Garrigan dedicated the St. Patrick's Catholic Church in Churdan, Iowa. The parish dissolved in the 1990s but the building itself was restored and added to the National Register of Historic Places in 1992.
- Born:
  - Philip Morrison, American physicist and professor, member of the Manhattan Project; in Somerville, New Jersey, United States (d. 2005)
  - M. Athalie Range, American public servant, first African American to serve on the Miami City Commission and first woman to head a Florida state agency, the Department of Community Affairs; as Mary Athalie Wilkinson, in Key West, Florida, United States (d. 2006)

== November 8, 1915 (Monday) ==
- Italian ocean liner Ancona was torpedoed and sunk in the Mediterranean Sea off Tunisia by Austro-Hungarian submarine SM U-38 with the loss of over 200 lives.
- British minesweeper HMAS Geranium was launched at Greenock Dockyard Company in Greenock, Scotland and would serve the Royal Navy until 1919 when it was transferred to the Royal Australian Navy.
- The Raven, a biographical film of Edgar Allan Poe directed by Charles Brabin was released, with Henry B. Walthall as Poe.
- The town of San Miguel de Sema, Colombia was established.
- Born:
  - Gustav Fischer, Swiss equestrian athlete, five-time Summer Olympic Games medal winner; in Meisterschwanden, Switzerland (d. 1990)
  - Wayne Ambler, American baseball player, second baseman and shortstop for the Philadelphia Athletics from 1937 to 1939; in Abington, Pennsylvania, United States (d. 1998)

== November 9, 1915 (Tuesday) ==
- Morava Offensive — Bulgaria penetrated 90 kilometers into Serbia after breaking through at Pirot, inflicting 6,000 casualties on Serbian forces. The Bulgarians had 1,906 killed, 10,637 wounded, and 925 missing.
- Battle of Krivolak — The French occupied the towns of Sirkovo and Krusevica in Vardar Macedonia as well as the Gradec and Gradsko rail stations.
- Leyland Line passenger ship Californian, was torpedoed and sunk in the Mediterranean Sea 61 nautical miles (113 km) southwest of Cape Matapan, Greece by German submarine SM U-35 with the loss of a crew member. The wreck has never been found.
- Born:
  - Sargent Shriver, American diplomat, founder of the Peace Corps; as Robert Sargent Schriver Jr., in Westminster, Maryland, United States (d. 2011)
  - Denis Hurley, South African clergy, Archbishop of the Roman Catholic Archdiocese of Durban from 1951 to 1959, first president of the Southern African Catholic Bishops' Conference when it officially came out against apartheid; in Cape Town, South Africa (d. 2004)
  - Aleda E. Lutz, American army medical officer, most decorated American army nurse, four-time recipient of the Air Medal and Distinguished Flying Cross; in Freeland, Michigan, United States (killed in action, 1944)

== November 10, 1915 (Wednesday) ==
- Kosovo Offensive — The Royal Serbian Army of 150,000 men under command of Chief of the Serbian General Staff Radomir Putnik made one last stand against the Central Powers invasion into Serbia at the city of Gjilan in eastern Kosovo.
- Fourth Battle of the Isonzo — Italy launched a new offensive on the Italian front, with concentrated forced with the Italian Second Army concentrating on Gorizia, then part of Austria-Hungary.
- Battle of Krivolak — French attempts to capture a strategic Bulgarian stronghold located in a Vardar Macedonia monastery failed, but were able to seize the nearby villages of Dolno Cicevo and Gorno Cicevo.
- Italian cargo liner Bosnia was sunk in the Mediterranean Sea southwest of Crete, Greece by German submarine SM U-34.
- French battleship Masséna was scuttled as a breakwater at Sedd el Bahr, Turkey.
- The Roman Catholic Diocese of Sobral was established in Sobral, Ceará, Brazil.
- Born: Torcuato Fernández-Miranda, Spanish politician, interim Prime Minister of Spain during the Spanish transition to democracy in 1973; in Gijón, Spain (d. 1980)
- Died: Richard Lockwood, 47, English rugby player, forward for the England national rugby union team from 1887 to 1894, and Wakefield Trinity from 1895 to 1901 (b. 1867)

== November 11, 1915 (Thursday) ==
- The Liberal Party of Norway formed the country's new government following parliamentary elections, winning 74 of the 123 seats in the Parliament of Norway.
- Battle of Krivolak — French forces captured a pair of key Bulgarian defense positions in Vardar Macedonia, forcing Bulgarian forces to fall back. However, growing Bulgarian offensive forces in the evening forced the French to evacuate the villages of Dolno Cicevo and Gorno Cicevo that they had captured the day before.
- Zaian War – A French military convoy was attacked by 1,500 Zayanes near Khenifra, Morocco, ending an informal six-month ceasefire.
- The 3rd Marching Regiment of the 1st Foreign Regiment merged with the 1st, creating the 3rd Foreign Infantry Regiment.
- Born:
  - William Proxmire, American politician, U.S. Senator for Wisconsin from 1957 to 1989; as Edward William Proxmire, in Lake Forest, Illinois, United States (d. 2005)
  - Ted Serong, Australian army officer, commander of the Australian Army Training Team Vietnam during the Vietnam War, recipient of the Order of the British Empire and the Distinguished Service Order; as Francis Philip Serong, in Abbotsford, Victoria, Australia (d. 2002)
  - Claude Clark, American artist and educator, known for works including Freedom Morning, Raising the Cross, author of A Black Teachers Guide to a Black Visual Arts Curriculum; in Rockingham, Georgia, United States (d. 2001)
  - Ben Gascoigne, New Zealand-born Australian astronomer, lead designer of the Anglo-Australian Telescope; as Sidney Charles Bartholomew Gascoigne, in Napier, New Zealand (d. 2010)

== November 12, 1915 (Friday) ==
- Battle of Krivolak — Bulgaria recaptured Krusevica in Vardar Macedonia while French forces halted at the outskirts of Ormanli and Kosturino.
- Australian physicist William Henry Bragg and his son Lawrence Bragg were jointly awarded the Nobel Prize in Physics "for their services in the analysis of crystal structure by means of X-rays."
- Born: Roland Barthes, French philosopher and literary critic, leading theorist on structuralism and post-structuralism; in Cherbourg-Octeville, France (d. 1980)

== November 13, 1915 (Saturday) ==
- Battle of Krivolak — Renewed attacks by Bulgaria forced the French to halt all operations in the Vardar Macedonia region and fall back to Bitola, Macedonia.
- Flying a BE.2, Royal Naval Air Service Flight Commander J. R. W. Smyth-Pigott made a daring night bombing attack on a bridge of the Berlin-Constantinople railway over the Maritsa River in the Ottoman Empire from an altitude of 300 feet (91 meters). Although the bridge survived, he received the Distinguished Service Order for gallantry.
- The D. H. Lawrence novel The Rainbow was prosecuted under the Obscene Publications Act and suppressed by Lawrence's publisher Methuen. Some 1,011 copies were seized and burnt, and the novel would be unavailable in Great Britain for eleven years, although editions were sold without legal challenge in the United States.
- The first film in the popular French crime serial Les Vampires by Louis Feuillade was released. Starring Édouard Mathé, Musidora and Marcel Lévesque, the series depicted a journalist investigating the exploits of a mysterious gang of thieves. A total 10 episodes were released between November 1915 and June 1916.
- Brazilian composer Heitor Villa-Lobos debuted his work publicly at his first concert.
- Died: Phineas F. Bresee, 76, American religious leader, founder of the Church of the Nazarene and Point Loma Nazarene University (b. 1838)

== November 14, 1915 (Sunday) ==
- Jim Thorpe played his first professional football game in a 16–0 Canton Bulldogs' loss to the Massillon Tigers. The game is also the first match-up between the two clubs since the 1906 betting scandal.
- Austrian-American actor Erich von Stroheim made his film debut in the romance Old Heidelberg although he has also appeared in uncredited parts in films directed by D. W. Griffith, including The Birth of a Nation and Intolerance where he also served as assistant director to help Griffith manage scenes involving hundreds of extras.
- Born:
  - George F. Bond, American navy medical officer, leading researcher in diving medicine, developer of SEALAB, recipient of the Navy Commendation Medal; in Willoughby, Ohio, United States (d. 1983)
  - Mabel Fairbanks, American figure skater, first African American and Native American to be inducted into the United States Figure Skating Hall of Fame and International Women's Sports Hall of Fame; in Everglades, Florida, United States (d. 2001)

== November 15, 1915 (Monday) ==
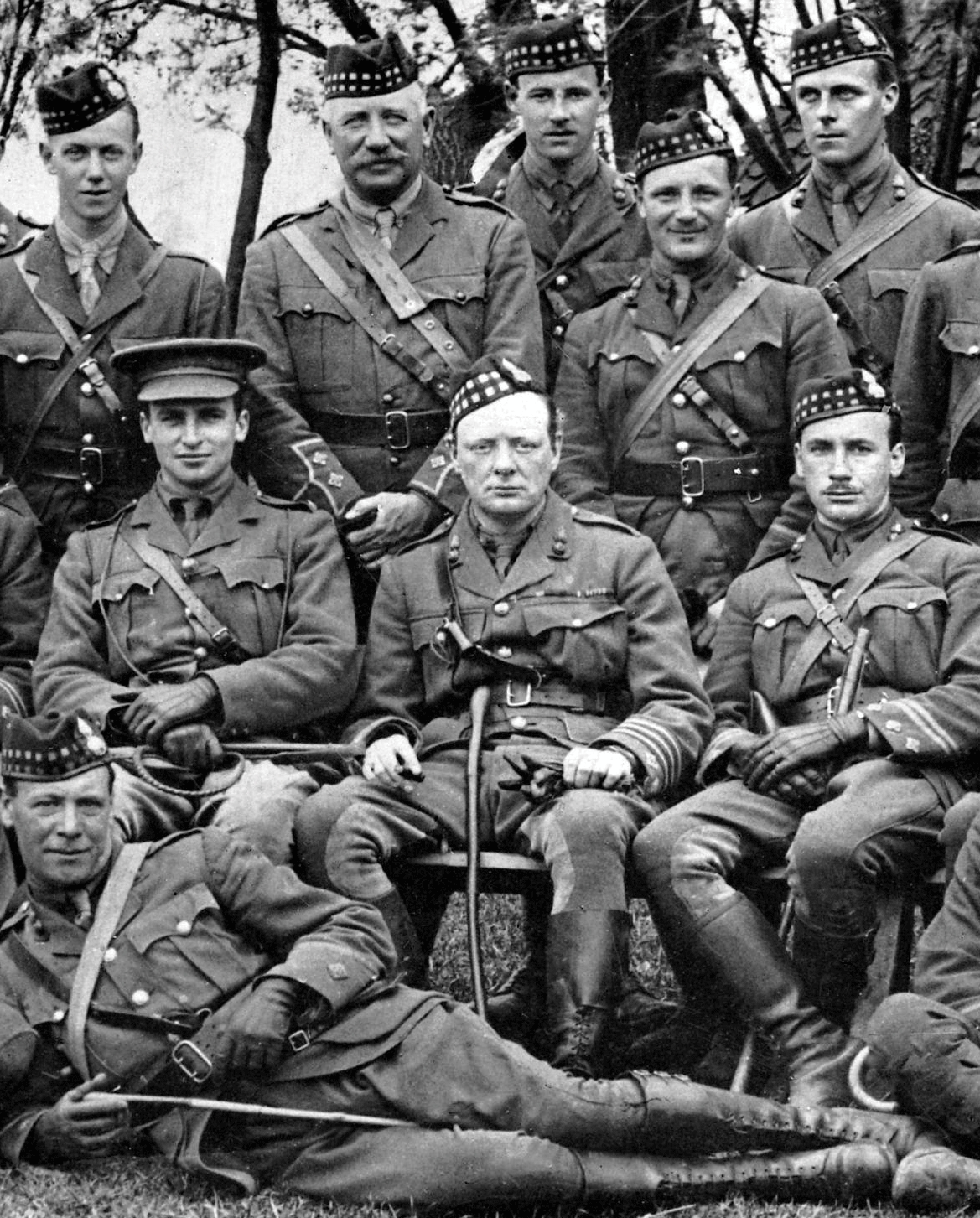
Winston Churchill sitting with the 6th Battalion, the Royal Scots Fusiliers.

- Ovče Pole Offensive — Bulgarian forces succeeded in capturing the Vardar river valley in Macedonia (under Serbian control) and cutting Allied forces in two, including the capture of cities Kumanovo and Veles.
- Winston Churchill resigned from all positions with the British government except for Member of Parliament. Soon after, he re-enlisted into the British Army and served as commander of the 6th Battalion of the Royal Scots Fusiliers on the Western Front.
- The first patients were admitted to the Muirdale Tuberculosis Sanatorium in Wauwatosa, Wisconsin, and would accept over 10,000 patients over the next 20 years. The medical facility ceased operations in 1978 and its main building was added to the National Register of Historic Places in 2018.
- The men's fraternity Pi Tau Sigma was established in Wisconsin, unknown to them that a fraternity with the same Greek letters has been established March 16 at the University of Illinois. The two fraternities met in 1916 and merged to form a national collegiate.
- The stage comedy Fair and Warmer by Avery Hopwood premiered at the Eltinge Theatre on Broadway in New York City, where it ran for 377 performances.
- The adventure novel The Man-Eater by Edgar Rice Burroughs was published serially in the New York World but would not appear in hardcover until 1957, seven years after Burroughs death.
- Born:
  - Valda Cooper, Australian-born American journalist, first female hard news reporter with Associated Press; in Melbourne, Australia (d. 2008)
  - V. R. Krishna Iyer, Indian judge and activist, advocate for legal aid in India, author of Wandering in Many Worlds; as Vaidyanathapuram Rama Iyer Krishna Iyer, in Palakkad, British India (present-day India) (d. 2014)
  - Konstantin Simonov, Soviet poet, best known for his war poem Wait for Me, recipient of the Order of the Red Banner and Order of Lenin; as Kirill Mikhailovich Simonov, in Petrograd, Russian Empire (present-day Saint Petersburg, Russia) (d. 1979)
  - David Stirling, British army officer, founder of the Special Air Service, recipient of the Order of the British Empire and Distinguished Service Order; as Archibald David Stirling, in Lecropt, Scotland (d. 1990)
- Died: Booker T. Washington, 59, American educator, founder of Tuskegee University, author of Up from Slavery (b. 1856)

== November 16, 1915 (Tuesday) ==
- Shinano Railway further extended the Ōito Line in the Nagano Prefecture, Japan by adding stations Alps-Oiwake to the line.
- Died:
  - Julius C. Burrows, 78, American politician, U.S. Senator from Michigan from 1895 until 1911 (b. 1837)
  - Kartar Singh Sarabha, 19, Indian Sikh revolutionary, member of the Ghadar Party and one of the defendants in the Lahore Conspiracy Case trial; executed for treason (b. 1896)
  - Bethany Veney, 100-103, American author, best known for her autobiography Aunt Betty’s Story: The Narrative of Bethany Veney, A Slave Woman (b. 1813)

== November 17, 1915 (Wednesday) ==
- British Red Cross hospital ship HMHS Anglia struck a mine in the English Channel 1 nautical mile (1.9 km) off Folkestone, Kent, England and sank with the loss of 134 lives.
- U.S. Marines under command of Smedley Butler captured Fort Rivière, the last rebel stronghold in Haiti, resulting in 50 rebel casualties.
- Senussi campaign — Senussi tribesman attacked the village of Sollum, Egypt where forces loyal to the Allies were stationed, killing two Bedouin soldiers and sabotaging the telegraph line.
- The operetta Die Csárdásfürstin by Hungarian composer Emmerich Kálmán premiered in Vienna and became Kálmán's most successful work.
- Born:
  - Michel Arnaud, French army officer, recipient of the Order of Liberation and Legion of Honour for his leadership during World War II; in Bourg-en-Bresse, France (d. 1990)
  - Frank McLardy, British partisan fighter, commander of the British Free Corps for the Waffen-SS during World War II; in Waterloo, Merseyside, England (d. 1981)

== November 18, 1915 (Thursday) ==
- The Nova Scotia Rifles, the first Canadian Maritimes rifle regiment, was established and entered service in 1916 during World War I.
- The Victor Denton War Memorial was unveiled in Nobby, Queensland, Australia during the March of the Dungarees war recruitment campaign. Private Victor Denton was killed at the Dardanelles in Turkey on 16 June 1915, and his memorial was the first of its kind in Queensland.
- The release of the U.S. silent film Inspiration was the first mainstream movie in which a leading actress (Audrey Munson) appeared nude.
- Born: Helmut Eberspächer, German air force officer, commander of the Schnellkampfgeschwader 10 for the Luftwaffe during World War II, recipient of the Knight's Cross of the Iron Cross; in Tübingen, German Empire (present-day Germany) (d. 2011)

== November 19, 1915 (Friday) ==
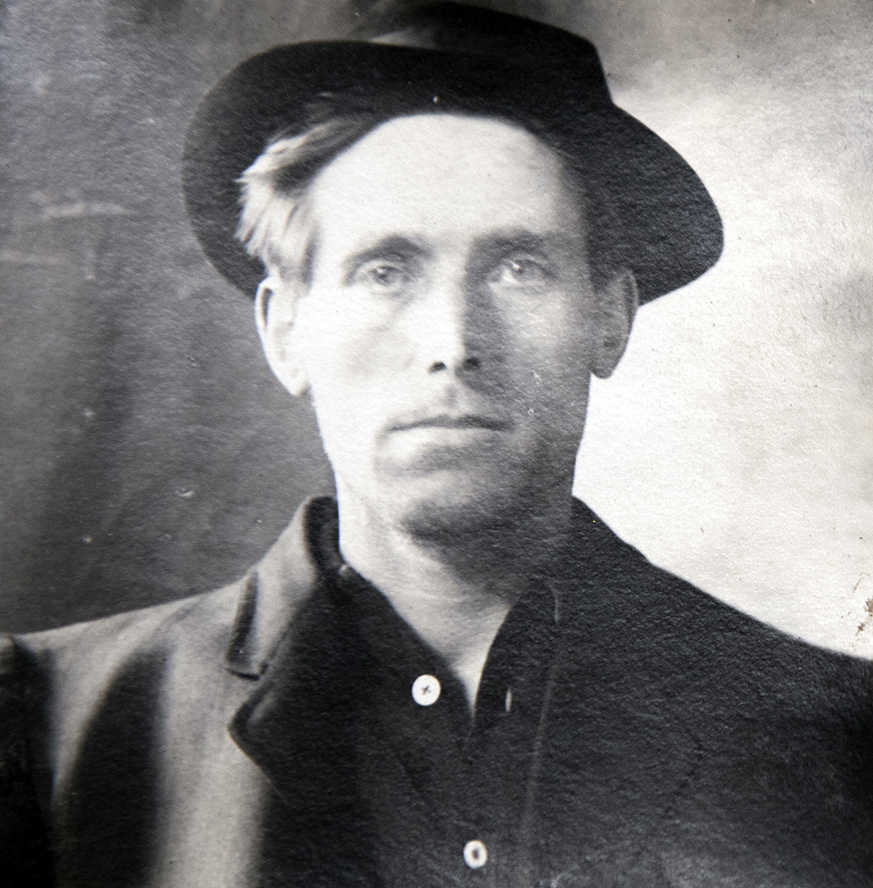
Joe Hill

- Royal Naval Air Service pilots Richard Bell Davies and Gilbert Smylie were making a bombing raid against a railway junction in Bulgaria when ground fire shot down Smylie's Farman bomber. In history's first combat rescue mission by an aircraft, Davies landed his single-seater Nieuport airplane, crammed Smylie into it while Bulgarian infantrymen closed in and took off, flying safely back to base. Davies received the Victoria Cross for his actions.
- Joe Hill, trade union leader for Industrial Workers of the World, was executed by a firing squad in Utah for the murders of Salt Lake City shopkeeper John G. Morrison and his son Arling in 1914, although his defenders claimed the evidence used at the trial to convict him was largely circumstantial, and had more to do with his supposed ties with anarchist elements within the labour organization.
- Born:
  - Earl Wilbur Sutherland Jr., American physiologist, recipient of the Nobel Prize in Physiology or Medicine for his research into hormones including epinephrine; in Burlingame, Kansas, United States (d. 1974)
  - Anita Lizana, Chilean tennis player, first Latin American to earn title World number 1 women's tennis player; as Anita Lizana de Ellis, in Santiago, Chile (d. 1994)
- Died: Solomon Schechter, 67, Moldavian-born British-American rabbi, leading figure of Conservative Judaism in the United States and founder of the United Synagogue of Conservative Judaism (b. 1847)

== November 20, 1915 (Saturday) ==
- Battle of Krivolak — Bulgaria captured an important bridgehead from the French in the Vardar Macedonia region.
- The Western Frontier Force was formed in response to offensives launched by the north African Senussi tribe who fought on behalf of the Ottoman Empire in what became the start of the Senussi campaign.
- The Hamilton Tigers defeated the Toronto Rugby and Athletic Association 13 to 7 at the 7th Grey Cup before 2,808 fans at Varsity Stadium at Toronto. It was the last Grey Cup to be held in Canada until 1920 after World War I ended.
- A prototype of the Felixstowe Porte Baby reconnaissance flying boat was first flown at Felixstowe, England. The Royal Naval Air Service would use them to patrol the North Sea for German naval ships, U-boats, and aircraft.
- The cornerstone of the memorial library and museum for U.S. President William McKinley was laid in his hometown of Niles, Ohio.
- Born:
  - Kon Ichikawa, Japanese film director, known for films such as An Actor's Revenge and the Olympics documentary Tokyo Olympiad; in Ise, Mie, Empire of Japan (present-day Japan) (d. 2008)
  - Hu Yaobang, Chinese politician, General Secretary of the Chinese Communist Party from 1982 to 1987; in Liuyang, Republic of China (present-day China) (d. 1989)
  - Felix Makasiar, Filipino judge, 14th Chief Justice of the Supreme Court of the Philippines; in Siaton, Philippine Islands (present-day Philippines) (d. 1992)

== November 21, 1915 (Sunday) ==
- Senussi campaign — Ahmed Sharif as-Senussi, Supreme Leader of the Senussi in North Africa, ordered his forces to cross the Egyptian frontier to execute a military coastal campaign against the Allies. An outpost southeast of Sollum, Egypt was attacked causing civil unrest in Alexandria when word of the attack reached the city. An Allied convoy that included the members of the New Zealand Rifle Brigade were deployed to guard the railway in the region and key oasis outposts south of Alexandria.
- The British polar exploration ship Endurance finally broke apart from the pressure of the ice pack around it and sank into the Weddell Sea, stranding the Imperial Trans-Antarctic Expedition party in the Antarctic. The remains of Endurance, 10,000 feet (3,000 m) beneath the surface of the Weddell Sea, would not be rediscovered for more than 106 years, finally spotted in March 2022.
- Ross Sea party — The British polar ship Aurora drifted across the Antarctic Circle where evidence began to show the ice encasing the vessel was starting to melt.
- The Zeppelin LZ 59 airship was completed in Friedrichshafen, Germany. At 178.5 metres (585 ft 8 in) in length and 18.7 metres (61 ft 4 in) when inflated with 35,800 m^{3} of gas contained in 18 gas cells, the airship was the largest ever built to date.
- The Christy Cabanne directed historical epic, Martyrs of the Alamo, was one of the first films released to depict the battle. Based on the historical novel of the same name by Theodosia Harris, the film featured an ensemble cast including Sam De Grasse, Douglas Fairbanks, Walter Long and Alfred Paget. Despite claims of being historically accurate, it drew criticism for its stereotypical portrayals of the Mexicans. A copy of the film was preserved at the Library of Congress.
- Born:
  - Louis J. Sebille, American air force officer, commander of the 67th Bomber Squadron during the Korean War, two-time recipient of the Distinguished Flying Cross, Medal of Honor, and 12 Air Medals; in Harbor Beach, Michigan, United States (killed in action, 1950)
  - Norm Smith, Australian rules football player, full-forward for Melbourne and Fitzroy from 1935 to 1950; as Norman Walter Smith, in Clifton Hill, Victoria, Australia (d. 1973)
- Died: Dixie Haygood, 53-54, American magician, popular female-led magic show include a two-year European tour with heads of state as audiences, including Kaiser Wilhelm of the German Empire, Emperor Franz Josef of Austria-Hungary, and Tsar Alexander of the Russian Empire (b. 1861)

== November 22, 1915 (Monday) ==
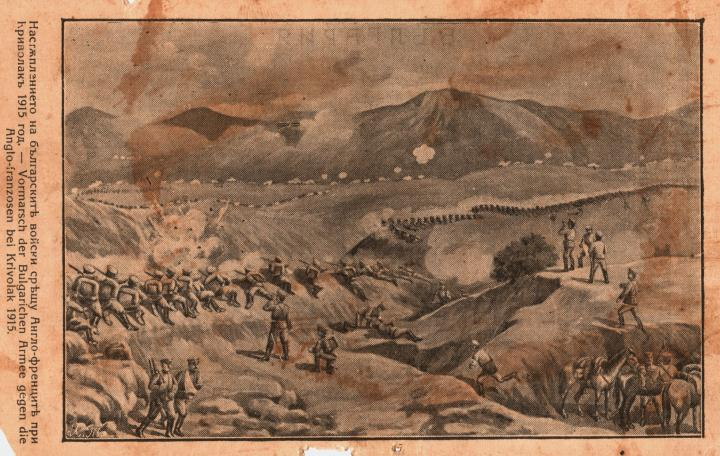
Bulgarian postcard depicting the battle.

- Battle of Ctesiphon — A force of 11,000 British and Indian soldiers under Charles Townshend, plus two naval warships, attacked a defending force of 18,000 Ottoman troops under command of Nureddin Pasha near the site of the ancient city of Ctesiphon, located on the Tigris southeast of Baghdad.
- Battle of Krivolak — Following the defeat of Serbian forces at Skopje, Macedonia, Allied operations became redundant in Vardar Macedonia. The French evacuated from the region with a loss of 3,161 killed, wounded or missing. Bulgaria sustained 5,877 casualties but retained control of the region.
- The Larrabee State Park was established, the first state park of Washington, United States.
- Born: Karl-Gottfried Nordmann, German air force pilot, commander of Jagdgeschwader 51 for the Luftwaffe during World War II, recipient of the Knight's Cross of the Iron Cross, in Giessen, German Empire (present-day Germany) (d. 1982)

== November 23, 1915 (Tuesday) ==
- Battle of Ctesiphon — Attempts for British forces to break through the Ottoman failed, marking the first time a turning point for the Ottoman Empire during the Mesopotamian campaign.
- Senussi campaign — About 300 Sikh troops were deployed to the garrison in Matruh, North Africa in response to Senussi aggression.
- The Iwate Light Railway was extended in the Iwate Prefecture, Japan, with stations Miyamori, Hirakura and Ashigase serving the line.
- The Triangle Film Corporation opened its new motion picture theater in Massillon, Ohio.
- Born:
  - Julio César Méndez Montenegro, Guatemalan state leader, 23rd President of Guatemala; in Guatemala City, Guatemala (d. 1996)
  - John Dehner, American animator and actor, animator for Fantasia and Bambi, actor known for TV roles such as Frontier and The Twilight Zone; as John Dehner Forkum, in Staten Island, New York, United States (d. 1992)
  - Kamadjaja, Indonesian writer and journalist, best known for preserving independent press during Japanese occupation during World War II; as Karkono Partokusumo, in Sragen Regency, Java, Dutch East Indies (present-day Indonesia) (d. 2003)

== November 24, 1915 (Wednesday) ==
- Kosovo Offensive — The Kosovo capital of Pristina fell to Bulgarian forces, a symbolic victory for Bulgaria as it lost control of the city to the Serbs in 1912.
- Battle of Ctesiphon — Heavy losses on both sides forced both British and Ottoman forces to withdraw, with side believing they would not have enough strength to engage the other at Baghdad.
- William Joseph Simmons revived the Civil War era Ku Klux Klan at Stone Mountain, Georgia.
- The Osseo Water Tower and water was completed in Osseo, Minnesota. The tower was added to the National Register of Historic Places in 2017.
- Born: Connie Buckley, Irish Gaelic football player, played centre-forward for Cork from 1934 to 1941; in Blackpool, Cork, Ireland (d. 2009)
- Died:
  - L. C. Hughes, 73, American politician, 11th Governor of Arizona Territory (b. 1842)
  - E. A. Hewett, 55, British merchant and colonial administrator, member of the Executive Council of Hong Kong from 1906 to 1915 (b. 1860)

== November 25, 1915 (Thursday) ==
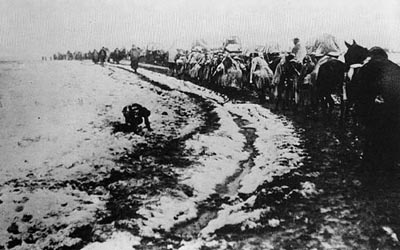
Serbian soldiers in the winter of 1915.

- Serbian Field Marshal Radomir Putnik ordered a full retreat of all Serbian military through Albania and Montenegro. Weather conditions at the time slowed the Central Powers, allowing some 155,000 Serbian soldiers and civilians to escape to the Adriatic Sea, but an estimated 200,000 more died of exposure, starvation and attacks by enemy soldiers and local Albanian militia.
- Battle of Ctesiphon — The battle between British and Ottoman forces ended in a draw but marked the last major success for Great Britain in the Mesopotamian campaign until 1916. The British suffered 4,500 casualties while Ottoman forces were heavier with estimates ranging from 6,200 to 9,500.
- Albert Einstein presented to the Prussian Academy of Sciences his formal paper on general relativity.
- British Parliament passed an act to restrict rent and mortgage rate increases in Great Britain during World War I.
- Born:
  - Augusto Pinochet, Chilean state leader and dictator, President of Chile from 1973 to 1990; as Augusto José Ramón Pinochet Ugarte, in Valparaíso, Chile (d. 2006)
  - Chung Ju-yung, Korean business leader, founder of Hyundai; in Tsusen, Korea, Empire of Japan (present-day T'ongch'ŏn County, North Korea) (d. 2001)
  - Henry P. Caulfield Jr., American public servant, first director of the Water Resources Council for the United States Department of the Interior, whose work lead to the formation of the National Wild and Scenic Rivers System; in New York City, United States (d. 2002)
  - Ron Hamence, Australian cricketer, played for the South Australia cricket team from 1936 to 1950; as Ronald Arthur Hamence, in Hindmarsh, South Australia, Australia (d. 2010)
  - Gösta Frändfors, Swedish wrestler, bronze medalist at the 1936 Summer Olympics and silver medalist at the 1948 Summer Olympics; as Gösta Valdemar Jönsson, in Stockholm, Sweden (d. 1973)

== November 26, 1915 (Friday) ==
- Battle of Nogales — The U.S. 12th Infantry under command of William H. Sage held off a raiding army of rebel soldiers loyal of Pancho Villa at the border town of Nogales, located on the international border between the U.S. state of Arizona and the Mexican state of Sonora. The Villa force retreated only to run into a force under command of Álvaro Obregón loyal to Venustiano Carranza. Casualties from the three-way battle included 70 killed or wounded.
- Gallipoli campaign — A heavy rainstorm struck Gallipoli for three days before turning into a blizzard by early December. The harsh weather caused many deaths from flooding and exposure to cold and unburied corpses washing into the trenches. This hastened plans to evacuate Allied troops from the beachheads.
- The new federal courthouse and post office opened in Muskogee, Oklahoma. It was added to the National Register of Historic Places in 2003 and renamed after U.S. Representative Ed Edmondson in 2003.
- Died: Washington Atlee Burpee, 57, American entrepreneur, founder of the seed company now known as Burpee Seeds (b. 1858)

== November 27, 1915 (Saturday) ==
- The British government introduced legislation to restrict housing rents to their pre-war level following Glasgow rent strikes led by Mary Barbour.
- The second Ku Klux Klan chapter was established in Stone Mountain, Georgia by William Joseph Simmons.
- Born:
  - Jean Berthiaume, Canadian army officer, commander of the Royal 22nd Regiment during World War II, recipient of the Order of the British Empire, Order of Saint John, and Canadian Forces' Decoration; in Saint-Hyacinthe, Quebec, Canada (d. 2003)
  - Thomas George Lanphier Jr., Panama-born American air force officer, credited as one of the pilots that shot down the plane carrying Admiral Isoroku Yamamoto, commander-in-chief of the Imperial Japanese Navy, recipient of the Navy Cross, Silver Star, Air Medal and Distinguished Flying Cross; in Panama City, Panama (d. 1987)
  - Deng Liqun, Chinese politician, Secretary of the Secretariat of the Chinese Communist Party from 1982 to 1987; in Guidong County, Republic of China (present-day China) (d. 2015)

== November 28, 1915 (Sunday) ==
- The Russian submarine Akula struck a mine and sank near the island of Hiiumaa in the Baltic Sea with all 35 crew on board.
- Born:
  - Donald Grant Nutter, American politician, 15th Governor of Montana; in Lambert, Montana, United States (killed in a plane crash, 1962)
  - Wilfred Kaplan, American mathematician, lead researcher in dynamical systems; in Boston, United States (d. 2007)
  - Inge King, German-born Australian sculptor, known for works including Forward Surge at the Arts Centre Melbourne; as Ingeborg Viktoria Neufeld, in Berlin, German Empire (present-day Germany) (d. 2016)
- Died:
  - Mubarak Al-Sabah, 77-78, Emir of Kuwait from 1896 to 1915; died of malaria (b. 1837)
  - Kobayashi Kiyochika, 68, major Japanese ukiyo-e painter and printmaker during the Meiji era (b. 1847)

== November 29, 1915 (Monday) ==
- German submarine SM UC-13 ran aground in the Black Sea and was scuttled.
- The Kintyre Technical College, later known as Keil School, opened in Dumbarton, Scotland.
- The Folkestone Harbour railway station was closed as part of the wartime measure at the port of Folkestone, England.
- The play Sadie Love by Avery Hopwood opened at the Gaiety Theatre in New York City.
- Born:
  - Billy Strayhorn, American jazz musician, best known for his collaborations with Duke Ellington and compositions such as "Take the "A" Train", "Chelsea Bridge", and "Lush Life"; as William Thomas Strayhorn, in Dayton, Ohio, United States (d. 1967)
  - Ludu Daw Amar, Burmese journalist, member of the Ludu Daily newspaper, wife to journalist Ludu U Hla; in Mandalay, British Burma (present-day Myanmar) (d. 2008)
  - Harold C. Schonberg, American columnist, known for his music criticism for The New York Times, recipient of the Pulitzer Prize for Criticism; in New York City, United States (d. 2003)

== November 30, 1915 (Tuesday) ==
- Mwambutsa was enthroned as the King of Burundi at the age of two following the death of his father Mutaga. His mother Ririkumutima was Queen regent and presided over the monarchy until he came of age. His reign lasted until 1962 when Burundi transitioned from a Belgian colony to an independent nation.
- The Walnut Canyon National Monument was established near Flagstaff, Arizona by U.S. President Woodrow Wilson to preserve the ancient cliff dwellings located in the canyon.
- Born:
  - Henry Taube, Canadian-born American chemist, recipient of the Nobel Prize in Chemistry for his research into electron transfer between metals; in Neudorf, Saskatchewan, Canada (d. 2005)
  - Angier Biddle Duke, American diplomat, U.S. Ambassador to El Salvador, Spain and Denmark, nephew to Anthony Joseph Drexel Biddle Jr.; in New York City, United States (d. 1995)
- Died: Gurazada Apparao, 53, Indian playwright, author of Kanyasulkam (b. 1862)
