= List of shipwrecks in November 1915 =

The list of shipwrecks in November 1915 includes ships sunk, foundered, grounded, or otherwise lost during November 1915.

== 1 November ==
List of shipwrecks: 1 November 1915
Ship	State	Description
Edith May	United Kingdom	The schooner was abandoned off the coast of Ireland. Her crew were rescued by the Ballygarry Lifeboat.
Glynn	United Kingdom	The schooner was driven ashore in South Bay, Wexford. Her crew survived.
Maria Reed	United Kingdom	The schooner was abandoned off the coast of Ireland. Her crew were rescued by the Ballygeary Lifeboat.
Marsden	United Kingdom	The tug was lost in the Mediterranean Sea on this date.
Sea View	United Kingdom	The schooner was driven ashore in South Bay, Wexford. Her crew survived.
HM Torpedo Boat 96	Royal Navy	The torpedo boat collided with the troopship Tringa (Royal Navy) off Gibraltar and sank with the loss of eleven of her eighteen crew.

== 2 November ==
List of shipwrecks: 2 November 1915
Ship	State	Description
Santa Clara	United States	The passenger steamer was wrecked on the bar at Coos Bay, Oregon. Two lifeboats swamped killing seven passengers and five crew.

== 3 November ==
List of shipwrecks: 3 November 1915
Ship	State	Description
Friargate	United Kingdom	World War I: The coaster struck a mine and sank in the North Sea 4 nautical miles (7.4 km) east of Aldeburgh, Suffolk with the loss of two of her crew.
Woodfield	United Kingdom	World War I: The cargo ship was shelled and sunk in the Mediterranean Sea 40 nautical miles (74 km) east south east of Ceuta, Spain (35°42′N 4°28′W) by SM U-38 (Imperial German Navy) with the loss of eight of her crew.
Woolwich	United Kingdom	World War I: The cargo ship was shelled and sunk in the Mediterranean Sea 104 nautical miles (193 km) south of Cape Sidero, Greece (33°35′N 26°30′E) by SM U-35 (Imperial German Navy). Her crew survived.
Yakusuni Maru	Japan	World War I: The cargo ship was sunk in the Mediterranean Sea off Alboran, Morocco (35°46′N 3°42′W) by SM U-38 (Imperial German Navy). Her crew survived.

== 4 November ==
List of shipwrecks: 4 November 1915
Ship	State	Description
Dahra	France	World War I: The cargo ship was sunk in the Mediterranean Sea off Arzew, Algeria (36°22′N 0°25′W) by SM U-38 (Imperial German Navy). Her crew survived.
Ionio	Italy	World War I: The cargo ship was sunk in the Mediterranean Sea off Cape Ivi, Algeria (36°28′N 0°04′E) by SM U-38 (Imperial German Navy). Her crew survived.
Le Calvados	France	World War I: The troopship was torpedoed, shelled and sunk in the Mediterranean Sea 22 nautical miles (41 km) north west of Cape Ivi, Algeria by SM U-38 (Imperial German Navy) with the loss of 740 lives. Lady Plymouth (United Kingdom) rescued 55 survivors.
SM UC-8	Imperial German Navy	The Type UC I submarine ran aground on Terschelling, Friesland, Netherlands (52°23′N 5°05′E). She was subsequently interned and taken into Dutch Navy service as HNLMS M 1.

== 5 November ==
List of shipwrecks: 5 November 1915
Ship	State	Description
Abbas	(Egypt) Egyptian Coast Guard	World War I: The ship was shelled and sunk in the Mediterranean Sea off Sollum by SM U-35 (Imperial German Navy).
Buresk	United Kingdom	World War I: The cargo ship was shelled and sunk in the Mediterranean Sea 30 nautical miles (56 km) north by west of Cape Bengut, Algeria by SM U-38 (Imperial German Navy). Her crew survived.
Dagmar	Sweden	The steel-hulled, four-masted barque departed from Glasgow, Scotland for Gothenburg, Sweden. Lost with all 24 crew without a trace.
Dagö	Imperial Russian Navy	World War I: The auxiliary minesweeper was torpedoed and sunk in the Baltic Sea off Osmussaar, Estonia (59°18′N 23°22′E) by SM U-9 (Imperial German Navy).
King William	United Kingdom	World War I: The trawler struck a mine and sank in the North Sea 125 nautical miles (232 km) east by north of the Spurn Lightship (United Kingdom) with the loss of two of her crew.
SMS S129	Imperial German Navy	The S90-class torpedo boat ran aground and sank in the North Sea near the island of Scharhörn with no casualties.
Sidi Ferruch	France	World War I: The cargo ship was sunk in the Mediterranean Sea 42 nautical miles (78 km) off Algiers, Algeria by SM U-38 (Imperial German Navy).
Tara	Royal Navy	World War I: The armed boarding steamer was torpedoed and sunk in the Mediterranean Sea off Sollum by SM U-35 (Imperial German Navy) with the loss of twelve lives.

== 6 November ==
List of shipwrecks: 6 November 1915
Ship	State	Description
Abdul Moneim	Egyptian Navy	World War I: The torpedo boat was shelled and sunk at Sallum by a German submarine.
Alastair	United Kingdom	World War I: The coaster struck a mine and sank in the North Sea 4 nautical miles (7.4 km) east of Southwold, Suffolk with the loss of seven of her crew.
Birgit	Finland	World War I: The coaster was sunk in the Baltic Sea 6 nautical miles (11 km) west of the Vestra Bank Lightship (flag unknown) (60°51′N 17°47′E) by SM U-10 (Imperial German Navy).
Caria	United Kingdom	World War I: The cargo ship was shelled and sunk in the Mediterranean Sea 120 nautical miles (220 km) south by east of Cape Martello, Crete, Greece (33°14′N 25°47′E) by SM U-35 (Imperial German Navy).
Clan Macalister	United Kingdom	World War I: The cargo ship was torpedoed and sunk in the Mediterranean Sea 120 nautical miles (220 km) south by east of Cape Martello (33°10′N 22°50′E) by SM U-35 (Imperial German Navy). Her crew survived.
HMS E20	Royal Navy	World War I: The E-class submarine was torpedoed and sunk in the Sea of Marmara by SM UB-14 (Imperial German Navy) with the loss of 21 of her 30 crew.
Elisa Francesca	Italy	World War I: The brigantine was sunk in the Mediterranean Sea off the coast of Algeria (37°22′N 6°33′E) by SM U-38 (Imperial German Navy).
Glenmoor	United Kingdom	World War I: The cargo ship was torpedoed and sunk in the Mediterranean Sea 5 nautical miles (9.3 km) northeast of the Cap de Fer, Algeria (37°06′N 7°12′E) by SM U-38 (Imperial German Navy). Her crew survived.
Lumina	United Kingdom	World War I: The tanker was shelled and sunk in the Mediterranean Sea 120 nautical miles (220 km) east by south of Cape Martello (33°04′N 25°56′E) by SM U-35 (Imperial German Navy). Her crew survived.
Prince Abbas	Egyptian Navy	World War I: The torpedo boat was shelled and sunk at Sallum by a German submarine.
Ticino	Italy	World War I: The cargo ship was sunk in the Mediterranean Sea 12 nautical miles (22 km) off the Cap de Fer (37°17′N 7°12′E) by SM U-38 (Imperial German Navy).
Yser	France	World War I: The cargo ship was sunk in the Mediterranean Sea 20 nautical miles (37 km) north northwest of the Cap de Fer (37°00′N 7°15′E) by SM U-38 (Imperial German Navy).

== 7 November ==
List of shipwrecks: 7 November 1915
Ship	State	Description
SMS A3	Imperial German Navy	The A1-class torpedo boat foundered in the Baltic Sea with the loss of all hands.
Bearnais	France	The tanker, a schooner, was severely damaged by fire at Bordeaux, Gironde. She was later repaired and returned to service as a cargo ship.
Carl	Sweden	The wooden schooner departed Visby destined for Gävle, and has not been heard from since, presumed lost in the Baltic Sea with the crew of seven.
France	France	World War I: The passenger ship was sunk in the Mediterranean Sea 85 nautical miles (157 km) south west of Cape Teulada, Sardinia, Italy (38°08′N 9°54′E) by SM U-38 (Imperial German Navy). Her crew survived.
Moorina	United Kingdom	World War I: The cargo ship was sunk in the Mediterranean Sea 105 nautical miles (194 km) south of Cape Martello Cape Martello, Crete, Greece (33°10′N 25°10′E) by SM U-35 (Imperial German Navy). Her crew survived.
Nord	United Kingdom	The tanker struck an uncharted rock off Port Arthur, South Australia and was abandoned. She foundered the next day. Her 42 crew survived. Nord was on a voyage from Melbourne, South Australia to Hobart, Tasmania, Australia.
HMT Princess Victoria	Royal Navy	The 128.3-foot (39.1 m), 272-ton minesweeping naval trawler collided with another vessel and sank in the Atlantic Ocean off Ouessant, Finistère, France.
SMS Undine	Imperial German Navy	World War I: The Gazelle-class cruiser was torpedoed and sunk in the Baltic Sea 20 nautical miles (37 km) south of Scania, Sweden by HMS E19 (Royal Navy).

== 8 November ==
List of shipwrecks: 8 November 1915
Ship	State	Description
Ancona	Italy	World War I: The ocean liner was torpedoed and sunk in the Mediterranean Sea off Tunisia (38°14′N 10°08′E) by SM U-38 ( (Austria-Hungary) Imperial German Navy) with the loss of over 200 lives.
Den of Crombie	United Kingdom	World War I: The cargo ship was shelled and sunk in the Mediterranean Sea 112 nautical miles (207 km) south west of (33°10′N 24°50′E) by SM U-35 (Imperial German Navy). Her crew survived.
Sesnon #3	United States	With no crew on board, the 41-ton scow sank without loss of life at Nome, Territory of Alaska.
Sesnon #8	United States	The barge was reported lost at Nome, Territory of Alaska.
Sir Richard Awdry	United Kingdom	World War I: The cargo ship was torpedoed and sunk in the Mediterranean Sea off Gavdos, Greece (31°25′N 25°38′E) by SM U-35 (Imperial German Navy) with the loss of a crew member.
Wacousta	Norway	World War I: The cargo ship was sunk in the Mediterranean Sea off Gavdos (33°46′N 24°43′E) by SM U-35 (Imperial German Navy). Her crew survived.

== 9 November ==
List of shipwrecks: 9 November 1915
Ship	State	Description
Californian	United Kingdom	World War I: The passenger ship was torpedoed and sunk in the Mediterranean Sea 61 nautical miles (113 km) south west of Cape Matapan, Greece (36°26′N 22°40′E) by SM U-35 (Imperial German Navy) with the loss of a crew member.
Clare (or Clare of Juneau)	United States	After her engine broke down and her anchor dragged during a gale, the 5-ton motor vessel was wrecked near Wedge Island (55°27′20″N 131°29′15″W) in Southeast Alaska. Her crew of two survived.
Firenze	Italy	World War I: The passenger ship was sunk in the Mediterranean Sea 37 nautical miles (69 km) off Syracuse, Sicily (36°40′N 16°04′E) by gunfire from SM U-38 (Imperial German Navy).
Irene	United Kingdom	World War I: The yacht, used as a lighthouse tender, struck a mine and sank in the Thames Estuary 1.5 nautical miles (2.8 km) east south east of the Tongue Lightship (United Kingdom) with the loss of 21 of her crew.
Jesus Marie	France	World War I: The fishing vessel was torpedoed and sunk in the north Sea off Dunkirk, Pas-de-Calais by SM UB-17 (Imperial German Navy) with the loss of all six crew.
Masséna	French Navy	World War I: The pre-dreadnought battleship was scuttled as a breakwater at Cape Helles, Ottoman Empire.
Skandia	Netherlands	The ship was sunk in a collision near Haugesund.
Skraastad	Norway	The cargo ship departed Port Talbot, Glamorgan, United Kingdom for Bordeaux, Gironde France. No further trace, presumed foundered with the loss of all hands.

== 10 November ==
List of shipwrecks: 10 November 1915
Ship	State	Description
Bosnia	Italy	World War I: The cargo liner was sunk in the Mediterranean Sea south west of Crete, Greece (33°32′N 23°10′E) by SM U-34 (Imperial German Navy).
France	France	World War I: The ship was sunk in the Mediterranean Sea by a submarine. Her 73 crew were rescued by a tug.

== 11 November ==
List of shipwrecks: 11 November 1915
Ship	State	Description
Rhineland	United Kingdom	World War I: The cargo ship struck a mine and sank in the North Sea 6.5 nautical miles (12.0 km) south east of Southwold, Suffolk with the loss of twenty of her crew.

== 12 November ==
List of shipwrecks: 12 November 1915
Ship	State	Description
Carthese	United Kingdom	The cargo ship was driven ashore in a gale at Goodwick, Pembrokeshire.
Dinorwic	United Kingdom	The cargo ship was driven ashore in a gale at Goodwick. She was later refloated.
Emerald Ray	United Kingdom	The schooner was wrecked in a gale at Kingstown, County Dublin.
Echo	United Kingdom	The cargo ship was driven ashore in a gale at Goodwick.
Holme Wood	United Kingdom	The cargo ship was driven ashore in a gale at Goodwick.
Industry	United Kingdom	The schooner was wrecked in a gale at Kingstown.
Inveresk	United Kingdom	The barque was wrecked in a gale at Kingstown.
Moorside	United Kingdom	World War I: The coaster struck a mine and sank in the English Channel off Boulogne, Pas-de-Calais, France with the loss of eight of her crew.
Nigel	United Kingdom	World War I: The cargo ship struck a mine and sank in the English Channel off Boulogne with the loss of five of her crew.
HMY Resource II	Royal Navy	The naval yacht was lost on this date.
Susitna	United States	The 11-gross register ton, 45.6-foot (13.9 m) motor passenger vessel was wrecked on the south end of Kalgin Island in Cook Inlet on the south-central coast of the Territory of Alaska. All three people on board survived.
Thora	United Kingdom	The ketch was wrecked in a gale at Fishguard, Pembrokeshire. Her crew were rescued by the Fishguard Lifeboat.
Tryfilia	Greece	The cargo ship was wrecked at Wexford, Ireland. Her twenty crew were rescued

== 13 November ==
List of shipwrecks: 13 November 1915
Ship	State	Description
HMT Silvery Wave	Royal Navy	The naval trawler was lost on this date.
St. Malo	France	The cargo ship capsized and sank in the English Channel off Guernsey, Channel Islands with the loss of eleven of her crew.

== 14 November ==
List of shipwrecks: 14 November 1915
Ship	State	Description
Harry W. Lewis	Canada	The schooner struck on Sow and Pigs Reef, near Cuttyhunk Island, Massachusetts, and was run ashore at Tarpaulin Cove, Massachusetts. Repaired and returned to service.
Treneglos	United Kingdom	World War I: The cargo ship was torpedoed and sunk in the Mediterranean Sea 70 nautical miles (130 km) south west of Gavdos, Greece (34°30′N 22°42′E) by SM U-34 (Imperial German Navy) with the loss of three crew.

== 15 November ==
List of shipwrecks: 15 November 1915
Ship	State	Description
Orange Prince	United Kingdom	World War I: The cargo ship was torpedoed and sunk in the Mediterranean Sea 85 nautical miles (157 km) south west by west of Gavdos, Greece (33°56′N 22°46′E) by SM U-34 (Imperial German Navy) with the loss of three crew.
Wandra	Australia	The cargo ship was wrecked in Jervis Bay, New South Wales.

== 16 November ==
List of shipwrecks: 16 November 1915
Ship	State	Description
Oksfjord	Norway	The barque was driven ashore on Île Houat, Morbihan, France with the loss of six of her crew.
Unknown barge	United States	The barge, under tow of Albert J. Stone (United States) sank in a severe gale off Minots Light. Lost with all three hands.
HMT Xerxes	Royal Navy	The naval trawler collided with another vessel and sank in the North Sea off Girdle Ness, Aberdeenshire with the loss of a crew member.

== 17 November ==
List of shipwrecks: 17 November 1915
Ship	State	Description
HMHS Anglia	United Kingdom	HMHS Anglia ( Red Cross): World War I: The hospital ship struck a mine in the English Channel 1 nautical mile (1.9 km) off Folkestone, Kent (51°02′N 1°19′E) and sank with the loss of 134 lives.
Lusitania	United Kingdom	World War I: The cargo ship struck a mine and sank in the English Channel 1 nautical mile (1.9 km) east of Folkestone. Her crew survived.
Ulriken	Norway	World War I: The cargo ship struck a mine and sank in the North Sea 3.5 nautical miles (6.5 km) east of the Galloper Lightship (United Kingdom) with the loss of four of her crew.

== 18 November ==
List of shipwrecks: 18 November 1915
Ship	State	Description
Enosis	United Kingdom	World War I: The collier was torpedoed and sunk in the Mediterranean Sea 150 nautical miles (280 km) east south east of Malta by SM U-33 (Imperial German Navy) with the loss of a crew member.
Helen W. Martin	United States	World War I: The schooner was sunk by a mine in the White Sea three miles (4.8 km) east north east of Cape Orlov, Russia. Raised, repaired and put in Danish service.
Ruth	United States	The scow capsized at Port Jefferson, New York.
Scow #38	United States	The scow capsized at Port Jefferson, New York.

== 19 November ==
List of shipwrecks: 19 November 1915
Ship	State	Description
HMT Falmouth III	Royal Navy	World War I: The naval trawler struck a mine and sank in the English Channel of Dover, Kent with the loss of seven of her crew.
Hallamshire	United Kingdom	World War I: The collier was torpedoed and sunk in the Mediterranean Sea 20 nautical miles (37 km) south west by south of Cerigotto, Greece (35°38′N 23°01′E) by SM U-34 (Imperial German Navy). Her crew survived.
Knickerbocker	United States	The ocean-going barge, under tow by Coastwise (United States) sank in a heavy gale off Barnegat Light, New Jersey. Lost with three hands killed.
San Miguel	Norway	World War I: The cargo ship struck a mine and sank in the North Sea. Her 25 crew were rescued by the trawler Viceroy (United Kingdom).
Senju Maru	Japan	World War I: The cargo ship was sunk in the Mediterranean Sea south of Malta (35°26′N 16°23′E) by SM U-33 (Imperial German Navy) with the loss of all hands.

== 20 November ==
List of shipwrecks: 20 November 1915
Ship	State	Description
Edith G	United States	The 5-net register ton motor vessel dragged her anchor and was wrecked in Lynn Canal in Southeast Alaska. Her crew of two survived.
Merganser	United Kingdom	World War I: The cargo ship was sunk by gunfire in the Mediterranean Sea 40 nautical miles (74 km) west-northwest of Gozo, Malta (36°30′N 13°00′E), by the submarine SM U-33 (Imperial German Navy). Her crew survived.
SMS Norburg	Imperial German Navy	The Vorpostenboot was lost on this date.

== 21 November ==
List of shipwrecks: 21 November 1915
Ship	State	Description
Endurance	United Kingdom	Endurance The three-masted barquentine – serving as Ernest Shackleton's ship in the British Imperial Trans-Antarctic Expedition – was crushed by ice and finally sank in the Weddell Sea after being icebound since January.
SMS Island	Imperial German Navy	The Vorpostenboot was lost on this date.

== 22 November ==
List of shipwrecks: 22 November 1915
Ship	State	Description
Ukraina	Russia	World War I: The sailing vessel was sunk in the Black Sea by SM UC-13 (Imperial German Navy).

== 23 November ==
List of shipwrecks: 23 November 1915
Ship	State	Description
Marusja Raja	Russia	World War I: The sailing vessel was sunk in the Black Sea off Sochi by SM UC-13 (Imperial German Navy).
Unione	Italy	World War I: The sailing vessel was sunk in the Adriatic Sea (41°46′N 19°32′E) by SM U-16 (Austro-Hungarian Navy). Her crew survived.

== 24 November ==
List of shipwrecks: 24 November 1915
Ship	State	Description
Daldorch	United Kingdom	The cargo ship was driven ashore at Southport, Lancashire. She was refloated on 1 December.
Liguria	Italy	World War I: The cargo ship was sunk in the Mediterranean Sea south of Marseille, Bouches-du-Rhône, France (42°00′N 3°59′E) by SM U-33 (Imperial German Navy). Her crew took to the lifeboats but were not seen again.
HMT Ruby	Royal Navy	The naval trawler was wrecked in Grandes Bay, Crete, Greece.
Sven	Sweden	World War I: The cargo ship departed Middlesbrough, United Kingdom for Malmö, Sweden and has not been heard from since. Presumed foundered - possibly mined - in the North Sea with the crew of fifteen.

== 25 November ==
List of shipwrecks: 25 November 1915
Ship	State	Description
Algerien	France	World War I: The cargo ship was sunk in the Mediterranean Sea 27 nautical miles (50 km) north north west of San Pietro Island, Italy (39°22′N 7°54′E) by SM U-33 (Imperial German Navy).

== 26 November ==
List of shipwrecks: 26 November 1915
Ship	State	Description
Tivoli	United States	The passenger steamer burned off Bloody Point, Chesapeake Bay. Two crew and four passengers were killed.
Tringa	United Kingdom	World War I: The cargo ship was shelled and sunk in the Mediterranean Sea 30 nautical miles (56 km) east of the Galite Islands, Tunisia (38°07′N 9°28′E) by SM U-33 (Imperial German Navy) with the loss of three crew.

== 27 November ==
List of shipwrecks: 27 November 1915
Ship	State	Description
Kingsway	United Kingdom	World War I: The cargo ship was shelled and sunk in the Mediterranean Sea 20 nautical miles (37 km) east south east of Cape Bon, Tunisia (37°00′N 11°22′E) by SM U-33 (Imperial German Navy) with the loss of five of her crew.
Klar	United Kingdom	World War I: The coaster struck a mine and sank in the North Sea off North Foreland, Kent.
Omara	France	World War I: The cargo ship was sunk in the Mediterranean Sea 20 nautical miles (37 km) north of Cape Bon (37°08′N 10°55′E) by SM U-33 (Imperial German Navy).
Tanis	United Kingdom	World War I: The cargo ship was shelled and sunk in the Mediterranean Sea 3 nautical miles (5.6 km) north of Zembra, Tunisia (37°11′N 10°49′E) by SM U-33 (Imperial German Navy). Her crew survived.

== 28 November ==
List of shipwrecks: 28 November 1915
Ship	State	Description
Akula	Imperial Russian Navy	World War I: The submarine struck a mine and sank off Hiiumaa with the loss of all 35 crew.
HM Gunboat Shaitan	Royal Navy	The auxiliary river gunboat was lost on this date.
HMT William Morrison	Royal Navy	World War I: The naval trawler struck a mine and sank in the North Sea (51°53′N 1°31′E) with the loss of three of her crew.

== 29 November ==
List of shipwrecks: 29 November 1915
Ship	State	Description
Dotterel	United Kingdom	World War I: The cargo ship struck a mine and sank in the English Channel 4.75 nautical miles (8.80 km) north by east of Boulogne, Pas-de-Calais, France with the loss of five of her crew.
HMS Duchess of Hamilton	Royal Navy	World War I: The auxiliary minesweeper struck a mine in the Thames Estuary (51°47′N 1°40′E) and sank with the loss of nine of her crew.
Maliniche	United Kingdom	World War I: The cargo ship was torpedoed and sunk in the Mediterranean Sea 50 nautical miles (93 km) east of Malta (35°35′N 15°22′E) by SM U-33 (Imperial German Navy). Her crew survived.
SM UC-13	Imperial German Navy	World War I: The Type UC I submarine ran aground in the Black Sea (41°00′N 30°08′E) and was scuttled.
Zarifis	Greece	World War I: The cargo ship was sunk in the Mediterranean Sea 100 nautical miles (190 km) east of Malta (35°15′N 16°33′E) by SM U-33 (Imperial German Navy).

== 30 November ==
List of shipwrecks: 30 November 1915
Ship	State	Description
Colenso	United Kingdom	World War I: The cargo ship was shelled and sunk in the Mediterranean Sea 95 nautical miles (176 km) east south east of Malta (35°34′N 16°33′E) by SM U-33 (Imperial German Navy) with the loss of a crew member.
Langton Hall	United Kingdom	World War I: The cargo ship was shelled and sunk in the Mediterranean Sea 112 nautical miles (207 km) east south east of Malta by SM U-33 (Imperial German Navy). Her crew survived.
Middleton	United Kingdom	World War I: The cargo ship was shelled and sunk in the Mediterranean Sea 75 nautical miles (139 km) south west by west of Gavdos, Greece by SM U-39 (Imperial German Navy) with the loss of four crew.

== Unknown date ==
List of shipwrecks: Unknown date November 1915
Ship	State	Description
Ella M. Doughty	United States	The fishing schooner sailed from Gloucester, Massachusetts on 3 November to Little Bay Islands, Newfoundland on a fishing trip and vanished. Believed lost in a gale in November or on 5 December. Lost with all six hands.
