= Aozasa Station =

Railway station in Tōno, Japan

Aozasa Station 青笹駅
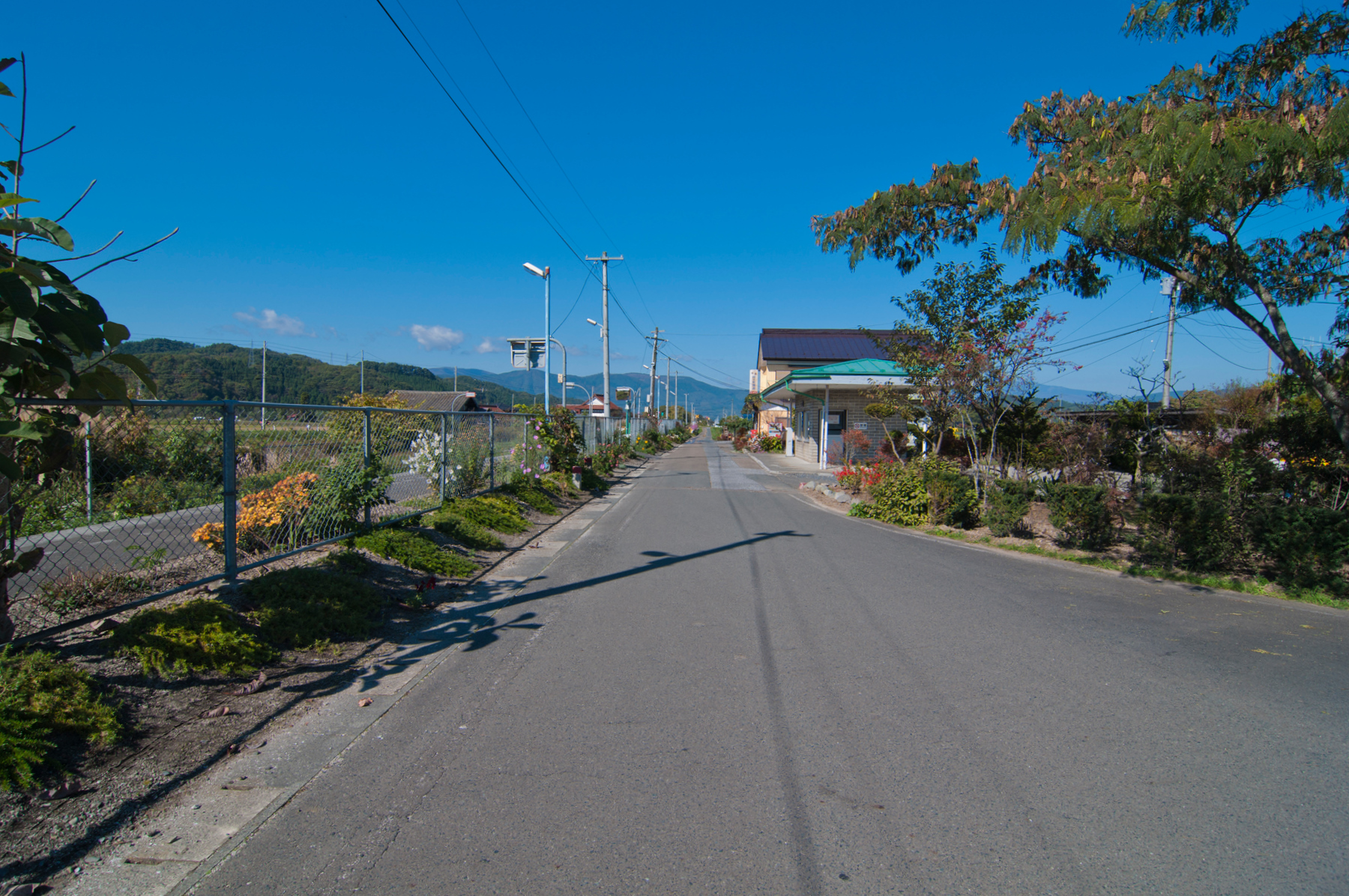
- Aozasa Station, October 2010

General information
- Location: Aozasachō, Aozasa 21, Tōno-shi, Iwate-ken 028-0503; Japan
- Coordinates: 39.3116°N 141.5692°E
- Operator: JR East
- Line: ■ Kamaishi Line
- Distance: 50.3 km from Hanamaki
- Platforms: 1 side platform
- Tracks: 1

Construction
- Structure type: At grade

Other information
- Status: Unstaffed
- Website: Official website

History
- Opened: 1 September 1915

Services
| Preceding station | JR East | Following station |
|---|---|---|
| Tōno towards Hanamaki | Kamaishi Line Local | Iwate-Kamigō towards Kamaishi |
Location
- Location within Iwate Prefecture Location within Japan

Aozasa Station (青笹駅, Aozasa-eki) is a railway station in the city of Tōno, Iwate, Japan, operated by East Japan Railway Company (JR East).

== Lines ==
Aozasa Station is served by the Kamaishi Line; it is located 50.3 rail kilometers from the terminus of the line at Hanamaki Station.

== Station layout ==
The station has one side platform, serving a single bi-directional track. There is no station building, but there is a brick weather shelter, located across the road parallel to the platform. The station is unattended.

== History ==
Aozasa Station opened on 1 September 1915 on the Iwate Light Railway (岩手軽便鉄道), a 762 mm (2 ft 6 in) light railway extending 65.4 km from Hanamaki to the now-defunct Sennintōge Station (仙人峠駅). The line was nationalized in 1936, becoming the Kamaishi Line. The station was absorbed into the JR East network upon the privatization of the Japanese National Railways (JNR) on 1 April 1987.

== Surrounding area ==
- Aozasa Post Office
- National Route 283

== See also ==
- List of railway stations in Japan
