= Iwate-Kamigō Station =

Railway station in Tōno, Iwate Prefecture, Japan

Iwate-Kamigō Station 岩手上郷駅
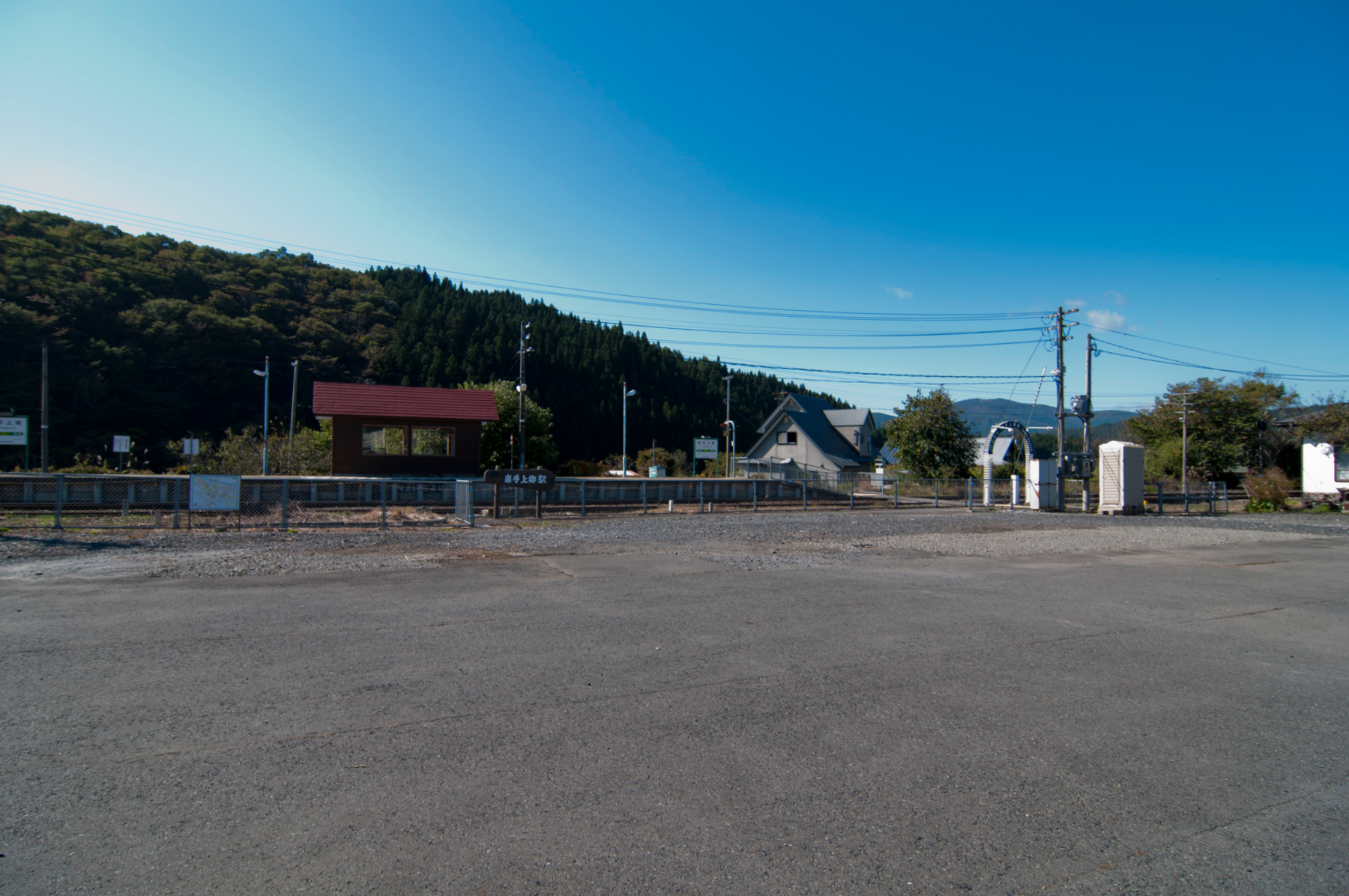
- Iwate-Kamigō Station in October 2010

General information
- Location: Kamigōchō, Sakazawa 12, Tōno-shi, Iwate-ken 028-0776; Japan
- Coordinates: 39.2849°N 141.5858°E
- Operator: JR East
- Line: ■ Kamaishi Line
- Distance: 53.8 km from Hanamaki
- Platforms: 1 island platform
- Tracks: 2

Construction
- Structure type: At grade

Other information
- Status: Unstaffed
- Website: Official website

History
- Opened: 18 April 1914
- Former names: Kamigō Station (until 1916)

Services
Preceding station	JR East	Following station
Tōno towards Hanamaki	Kamaishi Line Rapid Hamayuri (limited service)	Matsukura (limited service) towards Kamaishi
Aozasa towards Hanamaki	Kamaishi Line Local	Hirakura towards Kamaishi
Location
- Location within Iwate Prefecture Location within Japan

Iwate-Kamigō Station (岩手上郷駅, Iwate-Kamigō-eki) is a railway station in the city of Tōno, Iwate, Japan, operated by East Japan Railway Company (JR East).

== Lines ==
Iwate-Kamigō Station is served by the Kamaishi Line, and is located 53.8 kilometers from the terminus of the line at Hanamaki Station.

== Station layout ==
The station has a single island platform, serving two tracks. The platforms are not numbered The station is unattended.

=== Platforms ===
Entry side	■ Kamaishi Line	for Kamaishi and Miyako
Opposite side	■ Kamaishi Line	for Tōno and Hanamaki

== History ==
The station opened on 18 April 1914 as Kamigō Station (上郷駅), a station for freight services only on the Iwate Light Railway (岩手軽便鉄道), a 762 mm (2 ft 6 in) light railway extending 65.4 km from Hanamaki to the now-defunct Sennintōge Station (仙人峠駅). The station began serving passengers from 15 May 1914. The station was renamed Iwate-Kamigō on 10 February 1916.

The line was nationalized in August 1936, becoming the Kamaishi Line. The station was absorbed into the JR East network upon the privatization of the Japanese National Railways (JNR) on 1 April 1987.

== Surrounding area ==
- Iwate-Kamigō Post Office
- National Route 283
- National Route 340
- Hirakura Kannon

== See also ==
- List of railway stations in Japan
