= SM U-38 =

German submarine during WW1

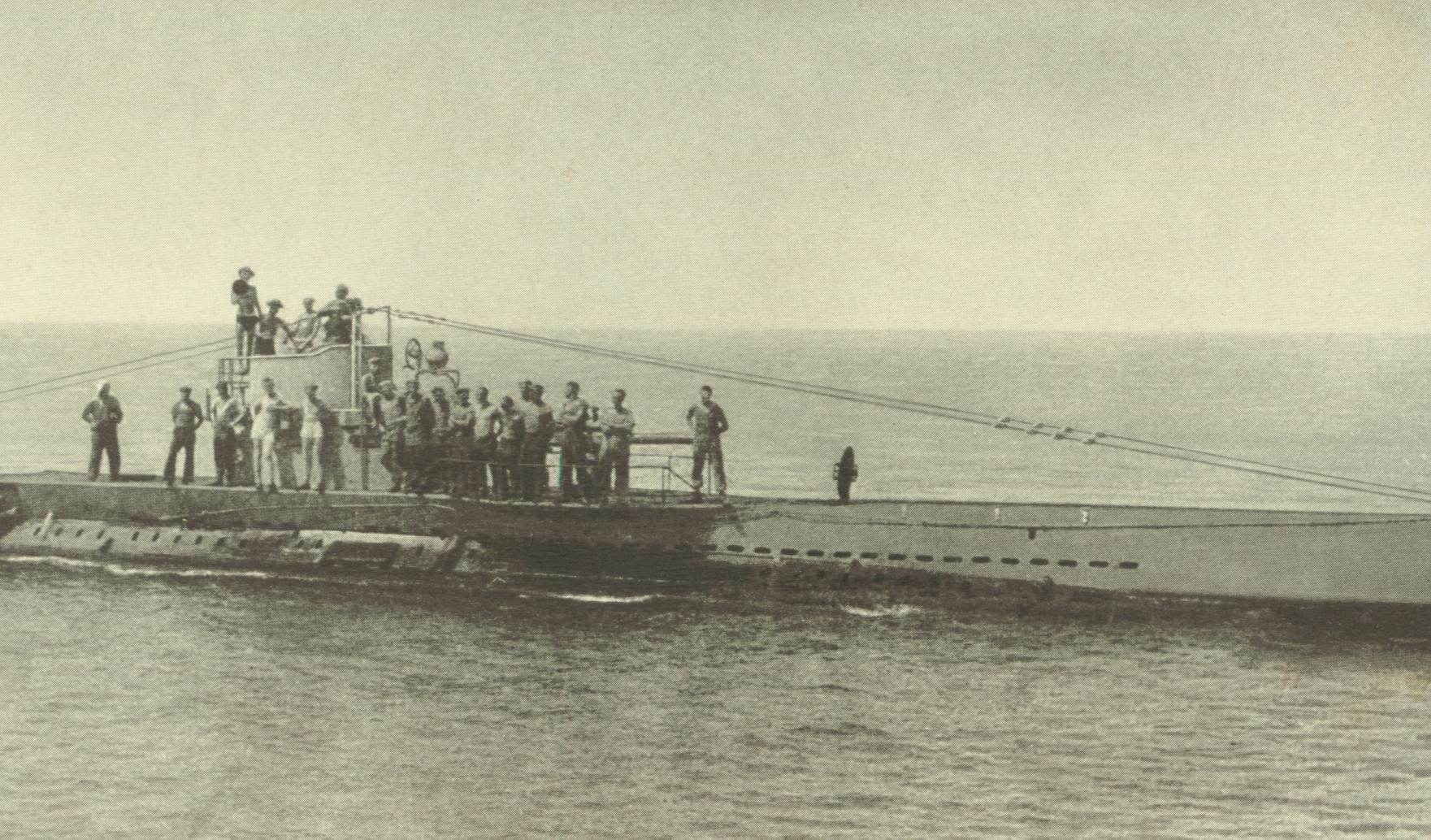
- SM U-38 with crew

History

German Empire
- Name: U-38
- Ordered: 12 June 1912
- Builder: Germaniawerft, Kiel
- Yard number: 198
- Laid down: 25 February 1913
- Launched: 9 September 1914
- Commissioned: 15 December 1914
- Fate: Surrendered 23 February 1919. Broken up at Brest 1921

General characteristics
- Class & type: Type U 31 submarine
- Displacement: 685 t (674 long tons) (surfaced); 878 t (864 long tons) (submerged)
- Length: 64.70 m (212 ft 3 in) (o/a); 52.36 m (171 ft 9 in) (pressure hull)
- Beam: 6.32 m (20 ft 9 in) (o/a); 4.05 m (13 ft 3 in) (pressure hull)
- Draught: 3.56 m (11 ft 8 in)
- Installed power: 2 × 1,850 PS (1,361 kW; 1,825 shp) diesel engines; 2 × 1,200 PS (883 kW; 1,184 shp) Doppelmodyn
- Propulsion: 2 × shafts; 2 × 1.60 m (5 ft 3 in) propellers
- Speed: 16.4 knots (30.4 km/h; 18.9 mph) (surfaced); 9.7 knots (18.0 km/h; 11.2 mph) (submerged)
- Range: 8,790 nmi (16,280 km; 10,120 mi) at 8 knots (15 km/h; 9.2 mph) (surfaced); 80 nmi (150 km; 92 mi) at 5 knots (9.3 km/h; 5.8 mph) (submerged)
- Test depth: 50 m (164 ft 1 in)
- Boats & landing craft carried: 1 dinghy
- Complement: 4 officers, 31 enlisted
- Armament: four 50 cm (20 in) torpedo tubes (2 each bow and stern); 6 torpedoes; one 8.8 cm (3.5 in) SK L/30 deck gun 10.5 cm (4.1 in) SK L/45 from 1916/17)

Service record
- Part of: II Flottille; Unknown start – 11 November 1915; Pola Flotilla; 11 November 1915 – 22 May 1916; Constantinople Flotilla; 22 May 1916 – 7 September 1918; Mittelmeer I Flotilla; 7 September – 11 November 1918
- Commanders: Kptlt. Max Valentiner; 5 December 1914 – 15 September 1917; Kptlt. Wilhelm Canaris; 16 September – 15 November 1917; Oblt.z.S. Hans Heinrich Wurmbach; 16 November 1917 – 18 January 1918; Kptlt. Clemens Wickel; 19 January – 11 November 1918
- Operations: 17 patrols
- Victories: 134 merchant ships sunk (287,811 GRT); 1 warship sunk (680 tons); 4 auxiliary warships sunk (4,643 GRT); 7 merchant ships damaged (29,821 GRT); 1 warship damaged (10,850 tons); 1 auxiliary warship damaged (3,848 GRT); 3 merchant ships taken as prize (3,550 GRT)

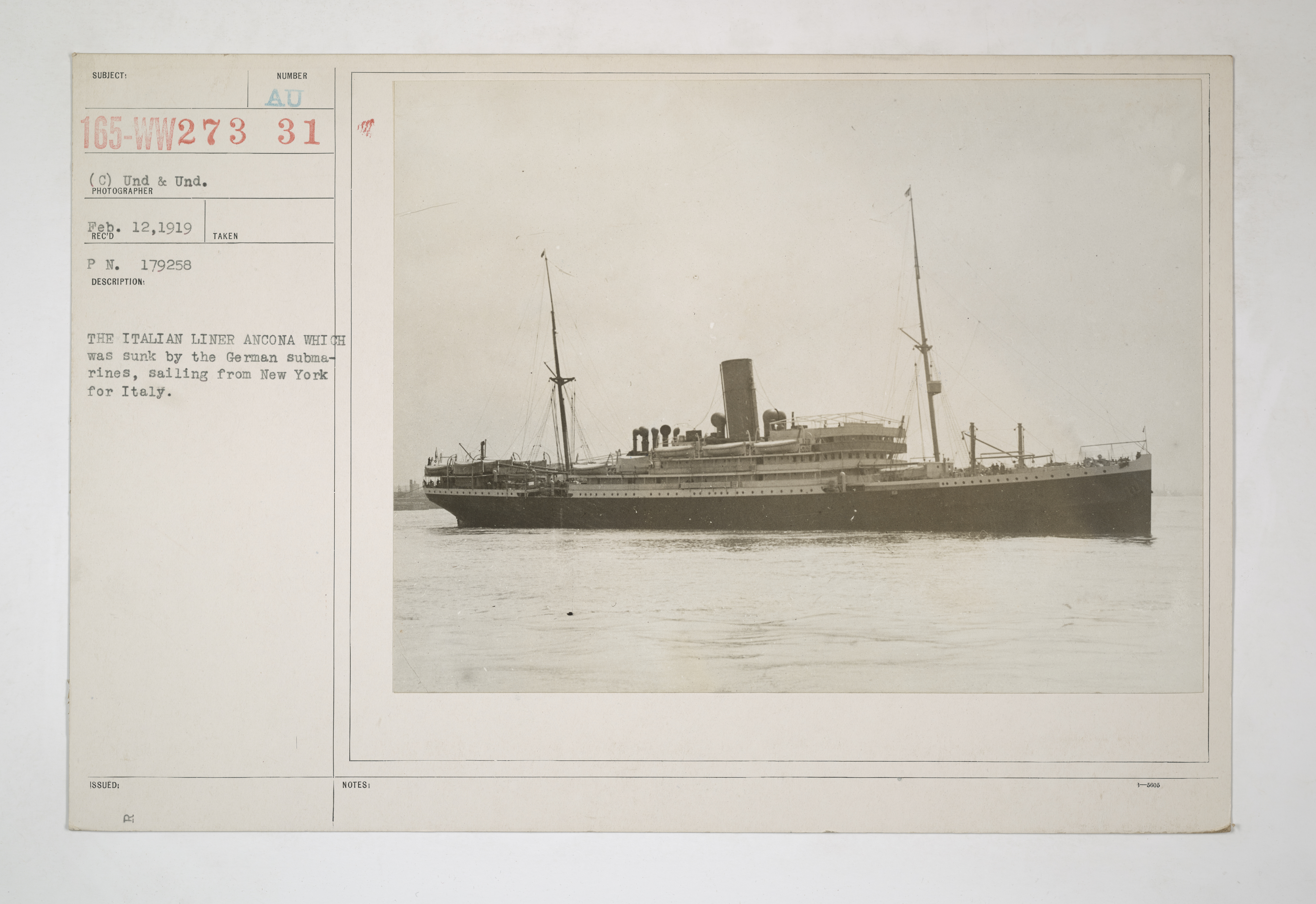
The Italian Liner SS Ancona which was sunk by the German submarines, sailing from New York for Italy

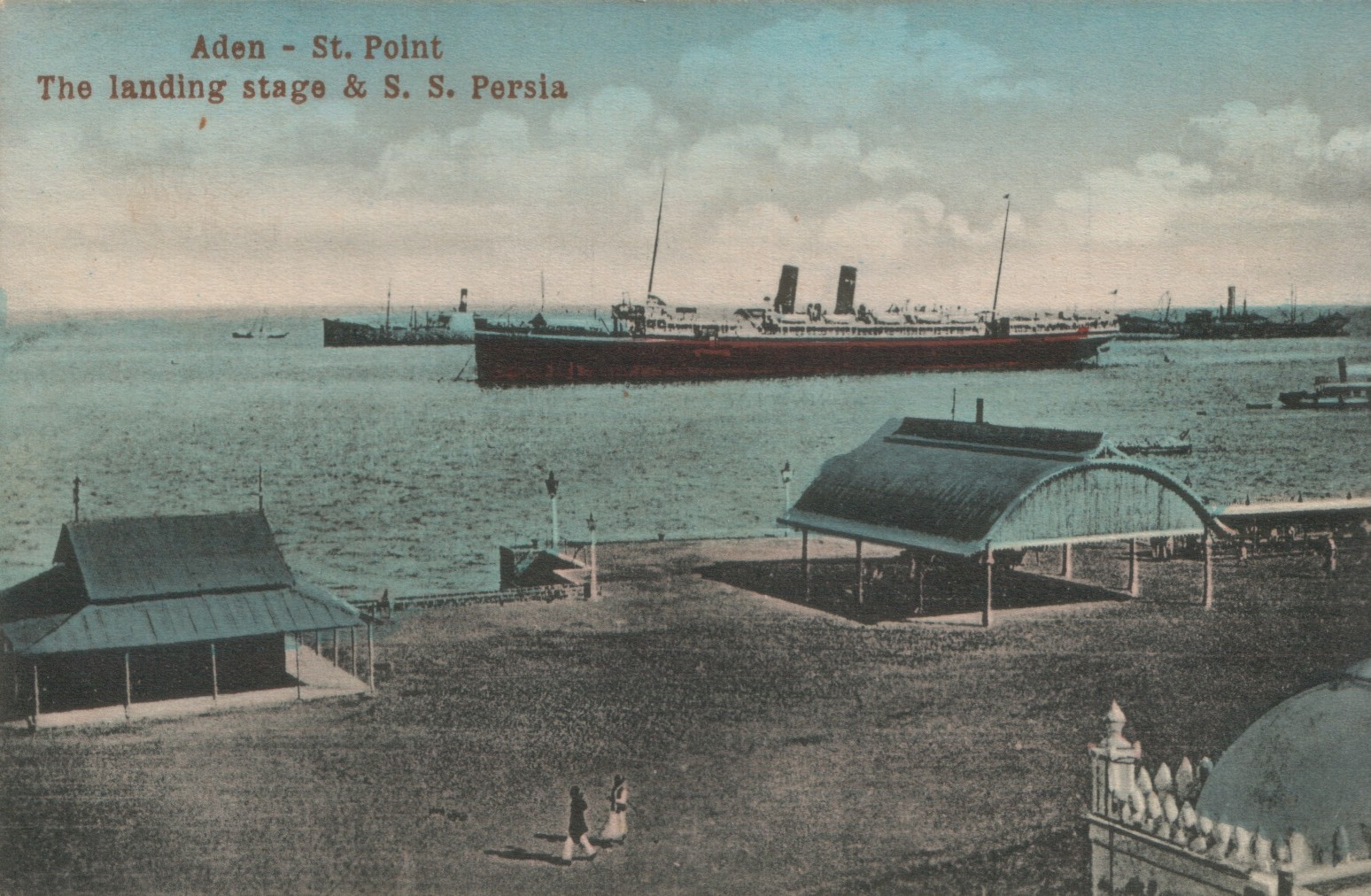
Postcard of SS Persia at Aden, c.1900

Max Valentiner

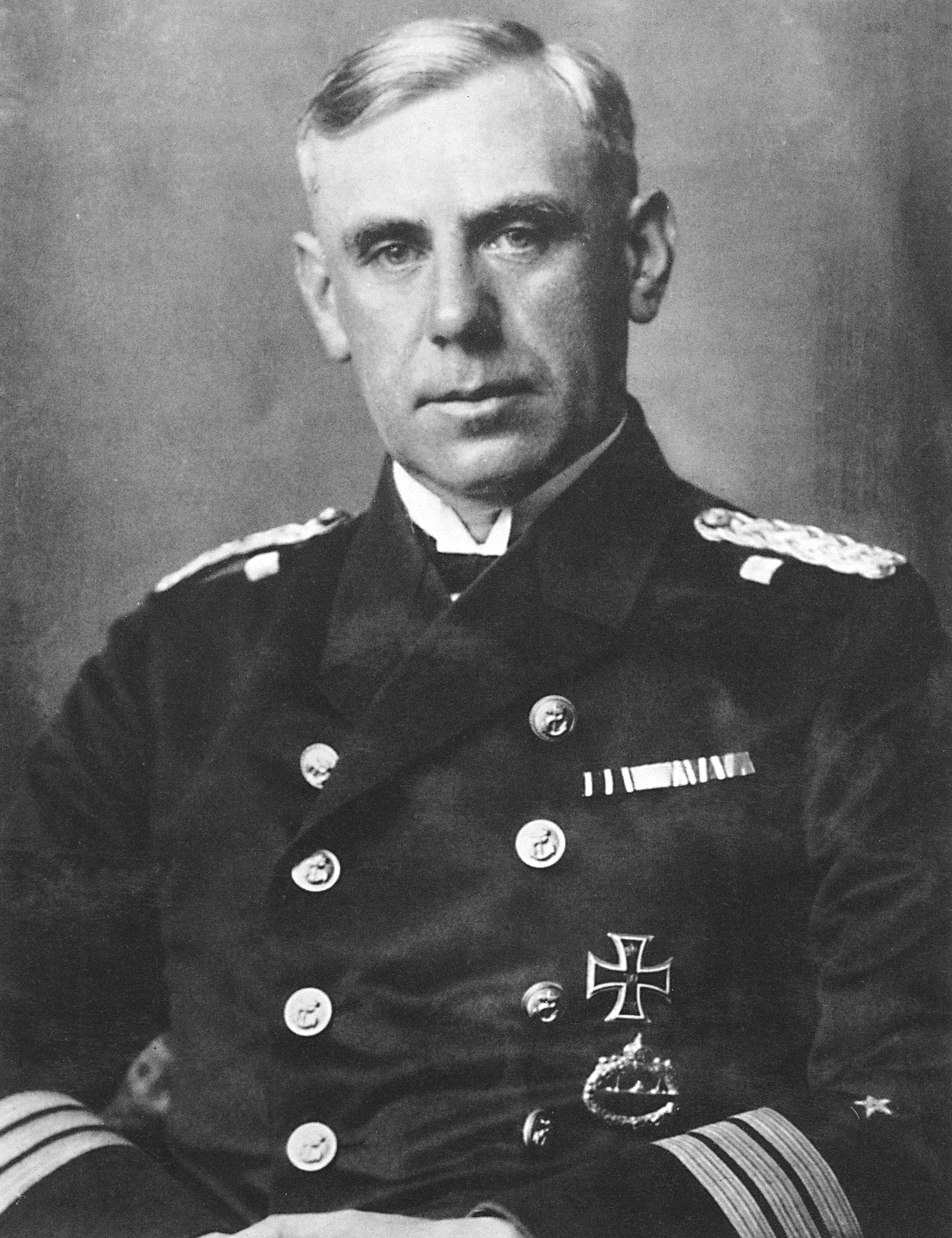
Canaris, while a Korvettenkapitän

SM U-38 was a German Type U 31 U-boat which operated in the Mediterranean Sea during World War I. It ended up being the third most successful U-boat participating in the war, sinking 134 merchant ships sunk for a total of 287,811 GRT.

Its longest serving captain was Kptlt. Max Valentiner, who was awarded the Pour le Mérite while in command of U-38. Valentiner was in command of U-38 in November and December 1915 when she sank the passenger liners Ancona and Persia; both were controversial since the ships were sunk by torpedoes without warning, in defiance of the then-current Prize rules, which stated that merchant vessels carrying passengers be given an opportunity to evacuate their passengers before being sunk.

In 1917 Valentiner was succeeded as commander of U-38 by Kptlt. Wilhelm Canaris, who decades later became an Admiral and head of the Abwehr (German Military Intelligence), in 1935–1944.

== Design ==
Type U 31 submarines were double-hulled ocean-going submarines similar to Type 23 and Type 27 subs in dimensions and differed only slightly in propulsion and speed. They were considered very good high sea boats with average manoeuvrability and good surface steering.

U-38 had an overall length of 64.70 m (212 ft 3 in), her pressure hull was 52.36 m (171 ft 9 in) long. The boat's beam was 6.32 m (20 ft 9 in) (o/a), while the pressure hull measured 4.05 m (13 ft 3 in). Type 31s had a draught of 3.56 m (11 ft 8 in) with a total height of 7.68–8.04 m (25 ft 2 in – 26 ft 5 in). The boats displaced a total of 971 tonnes (956 long tons); 685 t (674 long tons) when surfaced and 878 t (864 long tons) when submerged.

U-38 was fitted with two Germania 6-cylinder two-stroke diesel engines with a total of 1,850 metric horsepower (1,361 kW; 1,825 bhp) for use on the surface and two Siemens-Schuckert double-acting electric motors with a total of 1,200 PS (883 kW; 1,184 shp) for underwater use. These engines powered two shafts each with a 1.60 m (5 ft 3 in) propeller, which gave the boat a top surface speed of 16.4 knots (30.4 km/h; 18.9 mph), and 9.7 knots (18.0 km/h; 11.2 mph) when submerged. Cruising range was 8,790 nautical miles (16,280 km; 10,120 mi) at 8 knots (15 km/h; 9.2 mph) on the surface, and 80 nmi (150 km; 92 mi) at 5 knots (9.3 km/h; 5.8 mph) under water. Diving depth was 50 m (164 ft 1 in).

The U-boat was armed with four 50 cm (20 in) torpedo tubes, two fitted in the bow and two in the stern, and carried 6 torpedoes. Additionally U-38 was equipped in 1915 with one 8.8 cm (3.5 in) Uk L/30 deck gun, which was replaced with a 10.5 cm (4.1 in) gun in 1916/17. The boat's complement was 4 officers and 31 enlisted.

== Fate ==
After World War I ended, U-38 was surrendered to France and docked in Brest in 1919, and then broken up.

== Summary of raiding history ==
Date	Name	Nationality	Tonnage (Note: Merchant ship tonnages are in gross register tons. Military vessels are listed by tons displacement.)	Fate
18 April 1915	Brilliant	Norway	1,441	Captured as prize
22 April 1915	Eva	Norway	312	Sunk
22 April 1915	Oscar	Norway	766	Sunk
24 April 1915	Nidaros	Denmark	1,024	Captured as prize
27 April 1915	Torwald	Sweden	1,085	Captured as prize
30 April 1915	Elida	Sweden	1,693	Sunk
20 June 1915	HMS Roxburgh	Royal Navy	10,850	Damaged
21 June 1915	Carisbrook	United Kingdom	2,352	Sunk
22 June 1915	Leo	Russia	269	Sunk
23 June 1915	Truma	Norway	1,557	Sunk
23 June 1915	Elizabeth	United Kingdom	94	Sunk
23 June 1915	Four	United Kingdom	84	Sunk
23 June 1915	Josephine	United Kingdom	85	Sunk
23 June 1915	Piscatorial	United Kingdom	84	Sunk
23 June 1915	Research	United Kingdom	89	Sunk
23 June 1915	Uffa	United Kingdom	79	Sunk
23 June 1915	Ugiebrae	United Kingdom	79	Sunk
24 June 1915	Commander	United Kingdom	149	Sunk
24 June 1915	J. M. S.	United Kingdom	78	Sunk
24 June 1915	Lebanon	United Kingdom	111	Sunk
24 June 1915	Monarda	United Kingdom	87	Sunk
24 June 1915	Primrose	United Kingdom	91	Sunk
24 June 1915	Quiet Waters	United Kingdom	63	Sunk
24 June 1915	Star of Bethlehem	United Kingdom	77	Sunk
24 June 1915	Viceroy	United Kingdom	150	Sunk
24 June 1915	Vine	United Kingdom	110	Sunk
5 August 1915	Hans Emil	Denmark	106	Sunk
5 August 1915	Vanadis	Norway	484	Sunk
6 August 1915	Ocean Queen	United Kingdom	185	Sunk
6 August 1915	Westminster	United Kingdom	252	Sunk
9 August 1915	Thrush	United Kingdom	264	Sunk
10 August 1915	Oakwood	United Kingdom	4,279	Sunk
17 August 1915	Bonny	United Kingdom	2,702	Sunk
17 August 1915	George Baker	United Kingdom	91	Sunk
17 August 1915	Glenby	United Kingdom	2,196	Sunk
17 August 1915	Isidoro	Spain	2,044	Sunk
17 August 1915	Kirkby	United Kingdom	3,034	Sunk
17 August 1915	Maggie	United Kingdom	269	Sunk
17 August 1915	Paros	United Kingdom	3,596	Sunk
17 August 1915	Repeat	United Kingdom	107	Sunk
17 August 1915	The Queen	United Kingdom	557	Sunk
17 August 1915	Thornfield	United Kingdom	488	Sunk
19 August 1915	Baron Erskine	United Kingdom	5,585	Sunk
19 August 1915	Restormel	United Kingdom	2,118	Sunk
19 August 1915	Samara	United Kingdom	3,172	Sunk
20 August 1915	Bittern	United Kingdom	1,797	Sunk
20 August 1915	Carterswell	United Kingdom	4,308	Sunk
20 August 1915	Daghestan	Belgium	2,817	Sunk
20 August 1915	Martha Edmonds	United Kingdom	182	Sunk
21 August 1915	Cober	United Kingdom	3,060	Sunk
21 August 1915	Ruel	United Kingdom	4,029	Sunk
21 August 1915	San Melito	United Kingdom	10,160	Damaged
21 August 1915	Windsor	United Kingdom	6,055	Sunk
22 August 1915	Diomed	United Kingdom	4,672	Sunk
22 August 1915	Palmgrove	United Kingdom	3,100	Sunk
23 August 1915	Silvia	United Kingdom	5,268	Sunk
23 August 1915	Trafalgar	United Kingdom	4,572	Sunk
3 November 1915	Woodfield	United Kingdom	3,584	Sunk
3 November 1915	Yasukuni Maru	Japan	5,118	Sunk
4 November 1915	Dahra	France	2,127	Sunk
4 November 1915	Ionia	Italy	1,816	Sunk
4 November 1915	Le Calvados	France	1,658	Sunk, 740 people killed
4 November 1915	Mercian	United Kingdom	6,305	Damaged
5 November 1915	Buresk	United Kingdom	3,673	Sunk
5 November 1915	Sidi Ferruch	France	2,797	Sunk
6 November 1915	Elisa Francesca	Italy	208	Sunk
6 November 1915	Glenmoor	United Kingdom	3,075	Sunk
6 November 1915	Ticino	Italy	1,470	Sunk
6 November 1915	Yser	France	3,545	Sunk
7 November 1915	France IV	France	4,025	Sunk
8 November 1915	Ancona	Italy	8,210	Sunk, 206 people killed
9 November 1915	Firenze	Italy	3,960	Sunk
21 December 1915	Yasaka Maru	Japan	10,932	Sunk
30 December 1915	Clan Macfarlane	United Kingdom	4,823	Sunk
30 December 1915	Persia	United Kingdom	7,951	Sunk, 343 people killed
9 February 1916	Springwell	United Kingdom	5,593	Sunk
9 February 1916	HMS Thornhill	Royal Navy	3,848	Damaged
23 February 1916	Diadem	United Kingdom	3,752	Sunk
23 February 1916	Roubine	France	327	Sunk
24 February 1916	Denaby	United Kingdom	2,987	Sunk
24 February 1916	Fastnet	United Kingdom	2,227	Sunk
24 February 1916	Torborg	Sweden	1,266	Sunk
29 February 1916	Alexander Wentzel	Russia	2,832	Sunk
29 February 1916	Elisa S	Italy	209	Sunk
1 March 1916	Kilbride	United Kingdom	3,712	Sunk
16 May 1916	HMS Clifford	Royal Navy	487	Sunk
8 June 1916	Malorossija	Russia	893	Damaged
8 June 1916	Cementcrug	Russia	1,086	Sunk
8 June 1916	Ekaterina	Russia	70	Sunk
8 June 1916	Vera	Russia	1,231	Damaged
10 June 1916	Orion	Russia	429	Sunk
2 July 1916	Rockcliffe	United Kingdom	3,073	Sunk
9 July 1916	Vperied	Russia	859	Sunk
10 July 1916	Florida	Russia	3,238	Sunk
14 August 1916	HMS Remembrance	Royal Navy	3,660	Sunk
19 August 1916	Dea	Italy	166	Sunk
23 August 1916	Elios	Italy	190	Sunk
23 August 1916	Maria Brizzolari	Italy	152	Sunk
23 August 1916	Tanina	Italy	138	Sunk
24 August 1916	Isdalen	Norway	2,275	Sunk
24 August 1916	Liegeoise	Belgium	3,895	Sunk
25 August 1916	Leandros	Greece	1,658	Sunk
25 August 1916	Nostra Signora Del Carmine	Italy	1,575	Sunk
26 August 1916	Atlantico	Italy	3,069	Sunk
29 August 1916	Antigoon	Belgium	1,884	Sunk
29 August 1916	Francois Joseph	France	114	Sunk
29 August 1916	Stella Del Mare	Italy	1,166	Sunk
30 August 1916	Nostra Signora Della Guardia	Italy	1,588	Sunk
31 August 1916	Bacchus	France	3,583	Sunk
31 August 1916	Duart	United Kingdom	3,108	Sunk
31 August 1916	Piero Maroncelli	Kingdom of Italy	3,225	Sunk
1 September 1916	S. Francesco Di Paola	Italy	68	Sunk
1 September 1916	Swift Wings	United Kingdom	4,465	Sunk
1 September 1916	Antinous	United Kingdom	3,682	Damaged
2 September 1916	Strathallan	United Kingdom	4,404	Sunk
2 September 1916	Uranie	France	117	Sunk
3 September 1916	Villadoro	Italy	134	Sunk
4 September 1916	Laristan	United Kingdom	3,675	Sunk
5 September 1916	Saint Marc	France	5,818	Sunk
25 November 1916	Michael	Greece	2,410	Sunk
26 November 1916	Chemung	United States	3,062	Sunk
3 December 1916	Dacia	United Kingdom	1,856	Sunk
3 December 1916	Kanguroo	France	2,493	Sunk
3 December 1916	Surprise	French Navy	680	Sunk
8 December 1916	Brask	Norway	1,464	Sunk
8 December 1916	Britannia	United Kingdom	1,814	Sunk
9 December 1916	Brizella	Portugal	282	Sunk
10 December 1916	Esemplare	Italy	2,595	Sunk
13 December 1916	Angelo Parodi	Italy	3,825	Sunk
13 December 1916	Kaupanger	Norway	3,354	Sunk
15 December 1916	Emmanuele Accame	Italy	3,242	Sunk
17 December 1916	Tripoli	Italy	56	Sunk
20 December 1916	Itonus	United Kingdom	5,340	Sunk
25 January 1917	Sylvie	France	2,591	Sunk
7 February 1917	Aphrodite	France	130	Sunk
14 February 1917	Trowbridge	United Kingdom	3,712	Damaged
14 February 1917	Michele	Italy	41	Sunk
12 May 1917	Egyptian Prince	United Kingdom	3,117	Sunk
13 May 1917	Rio Amazonas	Italy	2,970	Sunk
25 May 1917	Kohinur	United Kingdom	2,265	Sunk
26 May 1917	Holmesbank	United Kingdom	3,051	Sunk
1 July 1917	Corrado	Italy	121	Sunk
1 July 1917	Volto Santo G.	Italy	225	Sunk
7 July 1917	La Resolu	France	186	Sunk
12 July 1917	Claire	Belgium	1,157	Sunk
15 July 1917	Atalante	France	124	Sunk
19 July 1917	Eloby	United Kingdom	6,545	Sunk
20 August 1917	Incemore	United Kingdom	3,060	Sunk
19 April 1918	Salambo	French Navy	248	Sunk
5 May 1918	Alberto Treves	Italy	3,838	Damaged
8 May 1918	Ingleside	United Kingdom	3,736	Sunk

== See also ==
- Room 40

== Bibliography ==
- Gröner, Erich; Jung, Dieter; Maass, Martin (1991). U-boats and Mine Warfare Vessels. German Warships 1815–1945. Vol. 2. Translated by Thomas, Keith; Magowan, Rachel. London: Conway Maritime Press. ISBN 0-85177-593-4.
- Eberhard Rössler: Geschichte des deutschen U-Bootbaus – Band 1. Bernard & Graefe Verlag 1996, ISBN 3-86047-153-8
- Bodo Herzog: Deutsche U-Boote 1906-1966. Manfred Pawlak Verlags GmbH, Herrschingen 1990, ISBN 3-88199-687-7
- Spindler, Arno (1966) [1932]. Der Handelskrieg mit U-Booten. 5 Vols. Berlin: Mittler & Sohn. Vols. 4+5, dealing with 1917+18, are very hard to find: Guildhall Library, London, has them all, also Vol. 1-3 in an English translation: The submarine war against commerce.
- Beesly, Patrick (1982). Room 40: British Naval Intelligence 1914-1918. London: H Hamilton. ISBN 978-0-241-10864-2.
- Halpern, Paul G. (1995). A Naval History of World War I. New York: Routledge. ISBN 978-1-85728-498-0.
- Roessler, Eberhard (1997). Die Unterseeboote der Kaiserlichen Marine. Bonn: Bernard & Graefe. ISBN 978-3-7637-5963-7.
- Schroeder, Joachim (2002). Die U-Boote des Kaisers. Bonn: Bernard & Graefe. ISBN 978-3-7637-6235-4.
- Koerver, Hans Joachim (2008). Room 40: German Naval Warfare 1914-1918. Vol I., The Fleet in Action. Steinbach: LIS Reinisch. ISBN 978-3-902433-76-3.
- Koerver, Hans Joachim (2009). Room 40: German Naval Warfare 1914-1918. Vol II., The Fleet in Being. Steinbach: LIS Reinisch. ISBN 978-3-902433-77-0.
