= SM UC-13 =

Coordinates: 41°09′N 30°30′E

History

German Empire
- Name: UC-13
- Ordered: 23 November 1914
- Builder: AG Weser, Bremen
- Yard number: 227
- Laid down: 28 January 1915
- Launched: 11 May 1915
- Commissioned: 15 May 1915
- Fate: Ran aground, 29 November 1915

General characteristics
- Class & type: Type UC I submarine
- Displacement: 168 t (165 long tons) surfaced; 182 t (179 long tons) submerged
- Length: 33.99 m (111 ft 6 in) o/a; 29.62 m (97 ft 2 in) pressure hull
- Beam: 3.15 m (10 ft 4 in)
- Draught: 3.06 m (10 ft 0 in)
- Propulsion: 1 × propeller shaft; 1 × 6-cylinder, 4-stroke diesel engine, 80 PS (59 kW; 79 bhp); 1 × electric motor, 175 PS (129 kW; 173 shp)
- Speed: 6.49 knots (12.02 km/h; 7.47 mph) surfaced; 5.67 knots (10.50 km/h; 6.52 mph) submerged
- Range: 910 nmi (1,690 km; 1,050 mi) at 5 knots (9.3 km/h; 5.8 mph) surfaced; 50 nmi (93 km; 58 mi) at 4 knots (7.4 km/h; 4.6 mph) submerged
- Test depth: 50 m (164 ft)
- Complement: 1officer, 13 men
- Armament: 6 × 100 cm (39 in) mine tubes; 12 × UC 120 mines; 1 × 8 mm (0.31 in) machine gun

Service record
- Part of: Constantinople Flotilla; 15 July – 29 November 1915
- Commanders: Oblt.z.S. Johannes Kirchner; 15 May – 29 November 1915
- Operations: 3 patrols
- Victories: 3 merchant ships sunk (321 GRT); 1 merchant ship damaged (1,280 GRT)

SM UC-13 was a German Type UC I minelayer submarine or U-boat in the German Imperial Navy (German: Kaiserliche Marine) during World War I. The U-boat was ordered for production on 23 November 1914, laid down on 28 January 1915, and was launched on 11 May 1915. She was commissioned into the German Imperial Navy on 15 May 1915 as SM UC-13. (Note: "SM" stands for "Seiner Majestät" (English: His Majesty's) and combined with the U for Unterseeboot would be translated as His Majesty's Submarine.) Mines laid by UC-13 in her three patrols were credited with sinking 3 ships.

== Design ==
A Type UC I submarine, UC-13 had a displacement of 168 tonnes (165 long tons) when at the surface and 182 tonnes (179 long tons) while submerged. She had a length overall of 33.99 m (111 ft 6 in), a beam of 3.15 m (10 ft 4 in), and a draught of 3.06 m (10 ft 0 in). The submarine was powered by one Benz six-cylinder, four-stroke diesel engine producing 80 metric horsepower (59 kW; 79 shp), an electric motor producing 175 metric horsepower (129 kW; 173 shp), and one propeller shaft. She was capable of operating at depths of up to 50 metres (160 ft).

The submarine had a maximum surface speed of 6.49 knots (12.02 km/h; 7.47 mph) and a maximum submerged speed of 5.67 knots (10.50 km/h; 6.52 mph). When submerged, she could operate for 50 nautical miles (93 km; 58 mi) at 4 knots (7.4 km/h; 4.6 mph); when surfaced, she could travel 910 nautical miles (1,690 km; 1,050 mi) at 5 knots (9.3 km/h; 5.8 mph). UC-13 was fitted with six 100 centimetres (39 in) mine tubes, twelve UC 120 mines, and one 8 millimetres (0.31 in) machine gun. She was built by AG Weser Bremen and her complement was fourteen crew members.

== Fate ==
UC-13 departed Constantinople on 12 November 1915 to operate in the Black Sea. On 29 November, while navigating using dead reckoning due to the adverse weather, she ran aground 55 nmi (102 km; 63 mi) east of the Bosphorous, near to the Melen River. The crew subsequently scuttled UC-13 using demolition charges before being picked up by Turkish vessels.

== Summary of raiding history ==
Date	Name	Nationality	Tonnage (Note: Merchant ship tonnages are in gross register tons. Military vessels are listed by tons displacement.)	Fate
26 August 1915	Sahina Noria	Italy	37	Sunk
22 November 1915	Ukraina	Russia	127	Sunk
22 November 1915	Rostov	Russia	1,280	Damaged
23 November 1915	Marusja Raja	Russia	157	Sunk
