= Ashigase Station =

Railway station in Tōno, Iwate Prefecture, Japan

Ashigase Station 足ヶ瀬駅
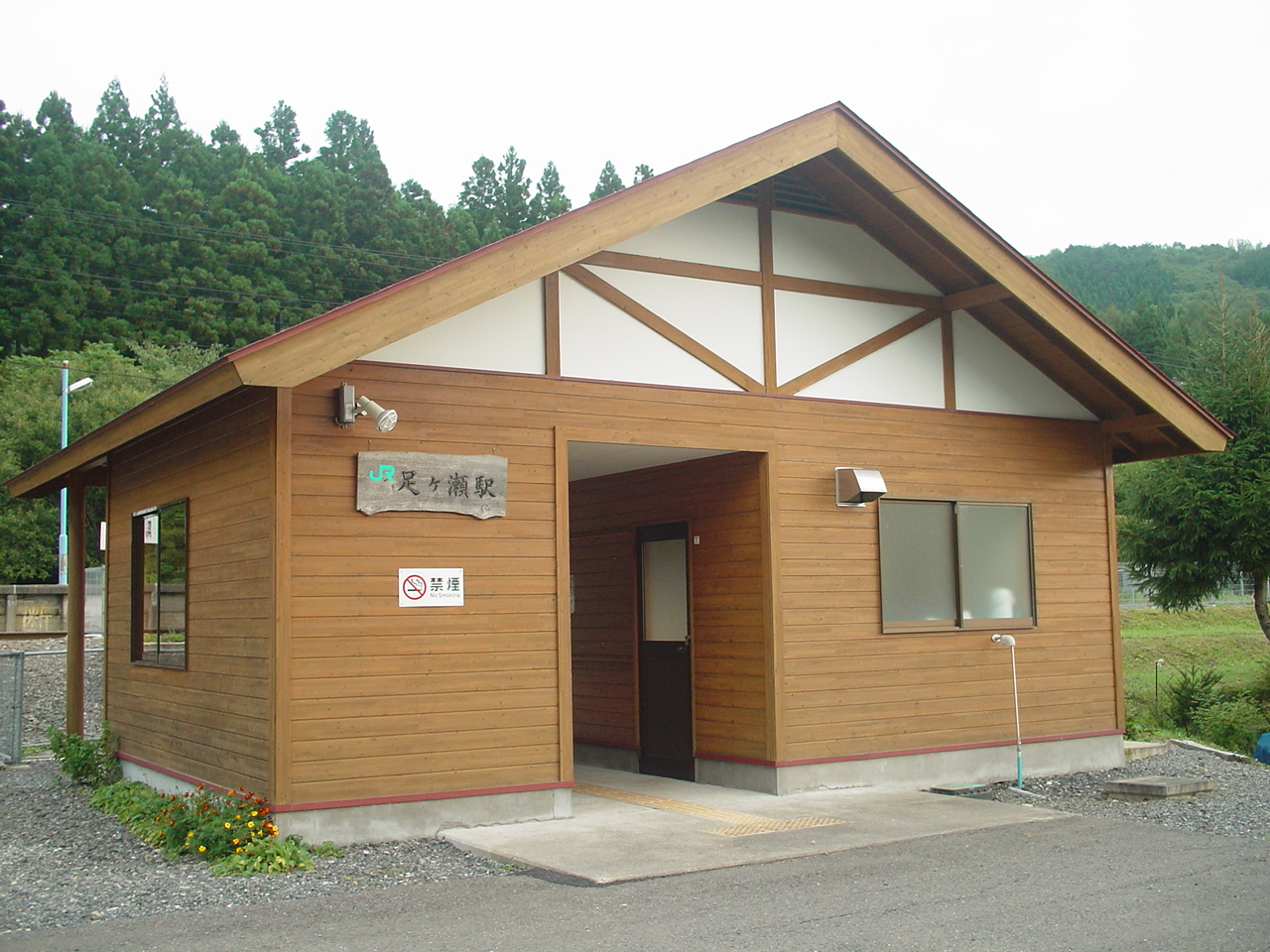
- Ashigase Station, September 2007

General information
- Location: Kamigōchō, Hosokoshi 38, Tōno-shi, Iwate-ken 028-0772; Japan
- Coordinates: 39.2548°N 141.6460°E
- Operator: JR East
- Line: ■ Kamaishi Line
- Distance: 61.2 km from Hanamaki
- Platforms: 1 island platform
- Tracks: 2

Construction
- Structure type: At grade

Other information
- Status: Unstaffed
- Website: Official website

History
- Opened: 23 November 1915

Services
Preceding station	JR East	Following station
Hirakura towards Hanamaki	Kamaishi Line Local	Kamiarisu towards Kamaishi
Location
- Location within Iwate Prefecture Location within Japan

Ashigase Station (足ヶ瀬駅, Ashigase-ek) is a railway station in the city of Tōno, Iwate, Japan, operated by East Japan Railway Company (JR East).

== Lines ==
Ashigase Station is served by the Kamaishi Line, and is located 61.2 rail kilometers from the terminus of the line at Hanamaki Station.

== Station layout ==
The station has a single island platform connected to the station building by a level crossing. The station is unattended.

=== Platforms ===
1	■ Kamaishi Line	for Kamaishi and Miyako
2	■ Kamaishi Line	for Tōno and Hanamaki

== History ==
Ashigase Station opened on 23 November 1915 initially as a station on the Iwate Light Railway (岩手軽便鉄道), a 762 mm (2 ft 6 in) light railway extending 65.4 km from Hanamaki to the now-defunct Sennintōge Station (仙人峠駅). The line was nationalized in 1936, becoming the Kamaishi Line. The station was absorbed into the JR East network upon the privatization of the Japanese National Railways (JNR) on 1 April 1987.

== Surrounding area ==
The station is located in an isolated rural area.

== See also ==
- List of railway stations in Japan
