= 1915 Newfoundland prohibition referendum =

- 4 November 1915

Results
Choice	Votes	%
Yes	24,956	82.31%
No	5,362	17.69%

A referendum on the introduction of prohibition was held in the Dominion of Newfoundland on 4 November 1915. It would prohibit unauthorised people from possessing or consuming any drinks with an alcohol content of more than 2%.

The rules required that at least 40% of registered voters vote in favour of the proposal for it to pass. With 24,956 voting in favour, the quorum of 24,581 was narrowly passed, and prohibition was introduced on 1 January 1917. It remained in force until 1924, when a quota system for purchasing alcoholic drinks was introduced. That was scrapped on 31 March 1966.

== Results ==
Choice	Votes	%
For	24,956	82.31
Against	5,362	17.69
Total	30,318	100.00
Registered voters/turnout	61,451	–
Source: Mail and Advocate; Western Star

=== Results by district ===
District	Yes		No		Valid votes	Registered voters	% registered voting yes
District	Votes	%	Votes	%	Valid votes	Registered voters	% registered voting yes
Bay de Verde	1,461	93.59	100	6.41	1,561	2,673	54.66
Bonavista Bay	2,805	85.75	469	14.25	3,274	6,229	45.03
Burgeo-La Poile	597	70.40	251	29.60	848	1,965	30.38
Burin	1,276	86.63	197	13.37	1,473	2,808	45.44
Carbonear	588	92.31	49	7.69	637	1,383	42.52
Ferryland	305	44.40	382	55.60	687	1,564	19.50
Fogo	1,189	82.80	247	17.20	1,436	2,321	51.23
Fortune Bay	1,095	90.87	110	9.13	1,205	2,604	42.05
Harbour Grace	1,172	86.37	182	13.41	1,354	3,034	38.63
Harbour Main	383	61.87	236	38.13	619	2,583	14.82
Placentia-St. Mary's	791	46.53	909	53.47	1,700	4,297	18.41
Port de Grave	823	85.91	135	14.09	958	1,928	42.69
St. Barbe	1,070	71.00	437	29.00	1,507	2,674	40.01
St. George's	553	62.20	336	37.80	889	2,923	18.92
St. John's East	2,278	83.29	457	16.71	2,735	6,175	36.89
St. John's West	2,154	89.19	261	10.81	2,415	4,862	44.30
Trinity	2,860	92.23	241	7.77	3,101	5,537	51.65
Twillingate	3,556	90.74	363	9.26	3,919	5,891	60.36
Total	24,956	82.31	5,362	17.69	30,318	61,451	40.61
