= SS France (1896) =

History

France
- Name: France
- Owner: Société Générale de Transports Maritimes À Vapeur SA – SGTM
- Port of registry: Marseille
- Builder: Forges & Chantiers De La Mediterranee
- Yard number: 942
- Completed: February 1897
- Identification: code letters JGHV
- Fate: Sunk 7 November 1915

General characteristics
- Type: Ocean liner
- Tonnage: 4,269 GRT
- Length: 121.1 m (397 ft 4 in)
- Beam: 12.8 m (42 ft 0 in)
- Depth: 9.3 m (30 ft 6 in)
- Decks: 2
- Installed power: 474 NHP
- Propulsion: Triple expansion steam engine, screw propeller
- Speed: 14 knots (26 km/h; 16 mph)
- Capacity: 1,190 passengers
- Crew: 115

SS France was a French ocean liner that was shelled by the German submarine SM U-38 in the Mediterranean Sea 85 nautical miles (157 km) south west of Cape Teulada, Sardinia, Italy (38°08′N 9°54′E), while she was travelling from Mudros, Greece, to Marseille, France.

== Construction ==
France was constructed in 1896 at the Forges & Chantiers shipyard in La Seyne, France. She was completed in 1897. The ship was 121.1 metres (397 ft 4 in) long, with a beam of 12.8 metres (42 ft 0 in) and a depth of 9.3 metres (30 ft 6 in). The ship was assessed at 4,269 gross register tons (GRT). She had a triple expansion steam engine driving a single screw propeller and the engine was rated at 474 nominal horsepower.

== Accident Of 1906 ==
On 1 March 1906 France ran aground with 800 passengers on board at Ilha Bela, near Santos, Brazil, following a navigational error and fog. The passengers were picked up by SS Poitou. She was refloated on 4 March 1906 and returned to service later that year.

== Sinking ==
On 7 November 1915, France was on a voyage from Mudros, Greece, to Marseille, France, when she was shelled by the German submarine SM U-38 in the Mediterranean Sea near the coast of Sardinia. After numerous explosions and fires, the crew and passengers abandoned the ship and she sank a few hours later. There were no casualties.
