= SS Le Calvados =

SS Le Calvados was a French cargo ship used as a troopship in World War I.

Le Calvados was built in 1890 at the Cockerill Yards in Hoboken, Antwerp, Belgium, for the French Compagnie Générale Transatlantique.

After the outbreak of World War I, the French Army requisitioned her for use in transporting troops. On 4 November 1915, the Imperial German Navy submarine SM U-38 torpedoed her in the Mediterranean Sea between Marseille, France, and Oran, French Algeria, 22 nautical miles (41 km) northwest of Cape Ivy, Arzew, French Algeria. Of the 800 people on board, 740 were killed. 55 survivors were rescued by the British SS Lady Plymouth, only 24h after the sinking.

== Links ==
- Account by one of the survivors, Capitain Georges Barré
- Wrecksite
