= SS Bosnia (1898) =

History
- Name: Bosnia
- Owner: Navigazione Generale Italiana; Societa Italiana Di Servizi Marittimi
- Port of registry: Italy
- Builder: Gio. Ansaldo & C., Genoa
- Yard number: 113
- Launched: 9 May 1898
- Fate: Sunk, 10 November 1915

General characteristics
- Type: Cargo liner
- Tonnage: 2,561 GRT
- Length: 97.9 m (321 ft 2 in) (p/p)
- Beam: 12 m (39 ft 4 in)
- Draft: 6.86 m (22 ft 6 in)
- Installed power: 220 nhp
- Propulsion: 1 shaft; 1 Triple-expansion steam engine
- Speed: 13 knots (24 km/h; 15 mph)

SS Bosnia was an Italian cargo liner built in the 1890s that was shelled and sunk by a German submarine in the Mediterranean Sea during World War I.

== Description ==
Bosnia had a tonnage of 2,561 gross register tons (GRT) and had a length between perpendiculars of 97.9 meters (321 ft 2 in). The ship had a beam of 12 meters (39 ft 4 in) and a draft of 6.86 meters (22 ft 6 in). She had a single triple-expansion steam engine, rated at 220 nominal horsepower, that drove one propeller shaft at a maximum speed of 13 knots (24 km/h; 15 mph).

== Construction and career ==
The ship was built in 1898 by the shipbuilding company Gio. Ansaldo & C. at their Sestri Ponente, Genoa shipyard, with the yard number of 113. She was constructed for the Italian shipping company Navigazione Generale Italiana. By 1915 Bosnia was owned by the Societa Italiana Di Servizi Marittimi, based in Venice. On 3 March the ship pulled off the French armored cruiser Amiral Charner after the warship had run aground under enemy fire off Dedeagatch, Bulgaria. Eight months later, Bosnia was sunk by the guns of the Imperial German Navy submarine U-34 some 100 nautical miles (190 km; 120 mi) north-northeast of Derna, Italian Libya, at coordinates 33°32′N 23°10′E. The sinking of Bosnia on 10 November 1915 caused the loss of 12 of the ship's crewmen. At the time of her sinking, she was carrying general cargo.
