= Hamzali =

Hamzali Хамзали
- Village
- Air view of the village

- Location within North Macedonia
- Country: North Macedonia
- Region: Southeastern
- Municipality: Bosilovo
- Elevation: 252 m (827 ft)

Population (2021)
  - Total: 20
- Time zone: UTC+1 (CET)
  - Summer (DST): UTC+2 (CEST)
- Car plates: SR
- Website: .

Hamzali (Macedonian: Хамзали) is a village in the municipality of Bosilovo, North Macedonia.

== Demographics ==
As of the 2021 census, Hamzali had 20 residents with the following ethnic composition:

- Macedonians 10
- Turks 7
- Persons for whom data are taken from administrative sources 3

According to the 2002 census, the village had a total of 22 inhabitants. Ethnic groups in the village include:

- Macedonians 12
- Turks 8
- Serbs 2

== See also ==
- Bosilovo Municipality
- Bosilovo
- Strumica
