= Čanaklija =

Čanaklija Чанаклија
- Location within North Macedonia
- Coordinates: 41.514585°N 22.732306°E
- Country: North Macedonia
- Region: Southeastern
- Municipality: Vasilevo

Population
  - Total: 598
- Time zone: UTC+1 (CET)
  - Summer (DST): UTC+2 (CEST)

Čanaklija (Macedonian: Чанаклија) is a village in the municipality of Vasilevo, North Macedonia.

== Demographics ==
According to the 2002 census, the village had a total of 598 inhabitants. Ethnic groups in the village include:

- Macedonians 554
- Turks 41
- Others 3

As of 2021, the village of Chanaklija has 421 inhabitants and the ethnic composition was the following:

- Macedonians – 360
- Turks – 22
- Romani – 4
- Person without Data - 35
