= Edrenikovo =

Edrenikovo Едрениково
- Location within North Macedonia
- Coordinates: 41.505396°N 22.587588°E
- Country: North Macedonia
- Region: Southeastern
- Municipality: Vasilevo

Population
  - Total: 225
- Time zone: UTC+1 (CET)
  - Summer (DST): UTC+2 (CEST)

Edrenikovo (Macedonian: Едрениково) is a village in the municipality of Vasilevo, North Macedonia.

== Demographics ==
According to the 2002 census, the village had a total of 225 inhabitants. Ethnic groups in the village include:

- Macedonians 224
- Others 1
