= Sedlarci =

Sedlarci Седларци
- Location within North Macedonia
- Coordinates: 41.489515°N 22.584037°E
- Country: North Macedonia
- Region: Southeastern
- Municipality: Vasilevo

Population
  - Total: 343
- Time zone: UTC+1 (CET)
  - Summer (DST): UTC+2 (CEST)

Sedlarci (Macedonian: Седларци) is a village in the municipality of Vasilevo, North Macedonia.

== Demographics ==
According to the 2002 census, the village had a total of 343 inhabitants. Ethnic groups in the village include:

- Macedonians 343

As of 2021, the village of Sedlarci has 246 inhabitants and the ethnic composition was the following:

- Macedonians – 207
- Person without Data - 39
