= Vladievci =

Vladievci Владиевци
- Location within North Macedonia
- Coordinates: 41.519374°N 22.610896°E
- Country: North Macedonia
- Region: Southeastern
- Municipality: Vasilevo

Population
  - Total: 544
- Time zone: UTC+1 (CET)
  - Summer (DST): UTC+2 (CEST)

Vladievci (Macedonian: Владиевци) is a village in the municipality of Vasilevo, North Macedonia.

== Demographics ==
According to the 2002 census, the village had a total of 684 inhabitants. Ethnic groups in the village include:

- Macedonians 679
- Turks 3
- Others 2

As of 2021, the village of Vladievci has 544 inhabitants and the ethnic composition was the following:

- Macedonians – 485
- Romani – 1
- Serbs – 1
- Person without Data - 57
