= Petralinci =

Petralinci Петралинци
- Village
- Location within North Macedonia
- Country: North Macedonia
- Region: Southeastern
- Municipality: Bosilovo
- Elevation: 202 m (663 ft)

Population (2021)
  - Total: 478
- Time zone: UTC+1 (CET)
  - Summer (DST): UTC+2 (CEST)
- Car plates: SR
- Website: .

Petralinci (Macedonian: Петралинци) is a village in the municipality of Bosilovo, North Macedonia.

== Demographics ==
According to the 2002 census, the village had a total of 605 inhabitants. Ethnic groups in the village include:

- Macedonians 602
- Others 3

As of 2021, the village of Petralinci has 478 inhabitants and the ethnic composition was the following:

- Macedonians – 417
- others – 3
- Person without Data - 58

== See also ==
- Bosilovo Municipality
- Bosilovo
- Strumica
