= Radičevo =

Radičevo Радичево
- Location within North Macedonia
- Coordinates: 41.537774°N 22.571626°E
- Country: North Macedonia
- Region: Southeastern
- Municipality: Vasilevo

Population
  - Total: 590
- Time zone: UTC+1 (CET)
  - Summer (DST): UTC+2 (CEST)

Radičevo (Macedonian: Радичево) is a village in the municipality of Vasilevo, North Macedonia.

== Demographics ==
According to the 2002 census, the village had a total of 590 inhabitants. Ethnic groups in the village include:

- Macedonians 575
- Turks 12
- Serbs 2
- Aromanians 1

As of 2021, the village of Radichevo has 386 inhabitants and the ethnic composition was the following:

- Macedonians – 332
- Turks – 6
- Person without Data - 48
