= Visoka Maala =

Visoka Maala Висока Маала
- Air view of the village

- Location within North Macedonia
- Coordinates: 41.555296°N 22.683849°E
- Country: North Macedonia
- Region: Southeastern
- Municipality: Vasilevo

Population
  - Total: 697
- Time zone: UTC+1 (CET)
  - Summer (DST): UTC+2 (CEST)

Visoka Maala (Macedonian: Висока Маала) is a village in the municipality of Vasilevo, North Macedonia.

== Demographics ==
According to the 2002 census, the village had a total of 497 inhabitants. Ethnic groups in the village include:

- Turks 495
- Others 2

As of 2021, the village of Visoka Maala has 697 inhabitants and the ethnic composition was the following:

- Turks – 697
