= Saraj, Bosilovo =

Saraj Сарај
- Village
- Location within North Macedonia
- Country: North Macedonia
- Region: Southeastern
- Municipality: Bosilovo

Population (2021)
  - Total: 833
- Time zone: UTC+1 (CET)
  - Summer (DST): UTC+2 (CEST)
- Car plates: SR
- Website: .

Saraj (Macedonian: Сарај) is a village in the municipality of Bosilovo, North Macedonia. It is located near Strumica.

== Demographics ==
According to the 2002 census, the village had a total of 937 inhabitants. Ethnic groups in the village include:

- Macedonians 935
- Serbs 2

As of 2021, the village of saraj has 833 inhabitants and the ethnic composition was the following:

- Macedonians – 679
- Turks – 5
- others – 1
- Person without Data - 148

== See also ==
- Bosilovo Municipality
- Strumica
- Bosilovo
