= Manush Georgiev =

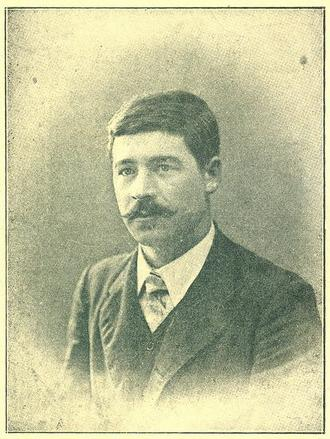
- Bulgarian revolutionary
- Born: 10 August 1881; Turnovo, Ottoman Empire
- Died: 7 February 1908 (aged 26); Dolna Ribnitsa, Ottoman Empire

Manush Georgiev (Bulgarian and Macedonian: Мануш Георгиев), also known as Manush voivoda (Bulgarian: Мануш войвода; Macedonian: Мануш војвода), was a Bulgarian revolutionary from Ottoman Macedonia, a member of the Internal Macedonian-Adrianople Revolutionary Organization. He graduated from the Bulgarian schools in Strumitsa and Serres, and was later appointed as a teacher in the villages of Barbarevo, Robovo, Borievo and Stinik.

Pursued by the Ottoman authorities as a revolutionary, in 1903 Manush Georgiev became illegal and joined the band of Hristo Chernopeev, and then he was the secretary of the voivode Dimitar Popstamatov. From 1904 he was appointed titular district voivode in the Petrich region. Contributes to the strengthening of the local revolutionary committees, protects the Bulgarian population.He grew up in VMORO and from 1907 he was elected assistant to the Strumica district voivode.

Georgiev was killed in a shootout with the Ottoman army and Bashi-bazouk near the village of Dolna Ribnitsa in 1908.
