= Robovo =

Robovo may refer to:

- Robovo, Bosilovo, North Macedonia
- Robovo, Pehčevo, North Macedonia
