= Radovo =

Radovo Радово
- Village
- Location within North Macedonia
- Coordinates: 41.450110°N 22.766789°E
- Country: North Macedonia
- Region: Southeastern
- Municipality: Bosilovo

Population (2002)
  - Total: 156
- Time zone: UTC+1 (CET)
  - Summer (DST): UTC+2 (CEST)
- Website: .

Radovo (Macedonian: Радово) is a village in the municipality of Bosilovo, North Macedonia. It is located near Strumica

== Demographics ==
According to the 2002 census, the village had a total of 851 inhabitants. The vast majority (97%) of the villagers are Catholic (Eastern). Ethnic groups in the village include:

- Macedonians 834
- Turks 16
- Others 1

Radovo is home to business that in 20 years grew into the country's biggest dairy company.

As of 2021, the village of Radovo has 804 inhabitants and the ethnic composition was the following:

- Macedonians – 761
- Turks – 19
- Albanians – 1
- Person without Data - 23

== Sports ==
Local football club FK Napredok recently played in the Macedonian Third League.

== See also ==
- Bosilovo Municipality
- Bosilovo
- Strumica
