= Dukatino =

Dukatino Дукатино
- Location within North Macedonia
- Coordinates: 41.543914°N 22.544764°E
- Country: North Macedonia
- Region: Southeastern
- Municipality: Vasilevo

Population
  - Total: 327
- Time zone: UTC+1 (CET)
  - Summer (DST): UTC+2 (CEST)

Dukatino (Macedonian: Дукатино) is a village in the municipality of Vasilevo, North Macedonia.

== Demographics ==
According to the 2002 census, the village had a total of 450 inhabitants. Ethnic groups in the village include:

- Macedonians 447
- Others 3

As of 2021, the village of Dukatino has 327 inhabitants and the ethnic composition was the following:

- Macedonians – 240
- Person without Data - 87
