= Dobrošinci =

Dobrošinci Доброшинци
- Location within North Macedonia
- Coordinates: 41.525484°N 22.675087°E
- Country: North Macedonia
- Region: Southeastern
- Municipality: Vasilevo

Population
  - Total: 678
- Time zone: UTC+1 (CET)
  - Summer (DST): UTC+2 (CEST)

Dobrošinci (Macedonian: Доброшинци) is a village in the municipality of Vasilevo, North Macedonia. The height above sea level is 217 meters.

== Demographics ==
According to the 2002 census, the village had a total of 936 inhabitants. Ethnic groups in the village include:

- Macedonians – 753
- Turks – 182
- Others – 1

As of 2021, the village of Dobroshinci has 678 inhabitants and the ethnic composition was the following:

- Macedonians – 433
- Albanians – 1
- Turks – 130
- Serbs – 1
- Others – 16
- Person without Data – 97

== Population ==
Population change by year
1948	1953	1971	1981	1991	1994	2002	2021
756	▲809	▼682	▲897	▲957	▼885	▲936	▼678

Population density (as of 2021): 369 p./km²
