= Ednokukjevo =

Ednokukjevo Еднокуќево
- Village
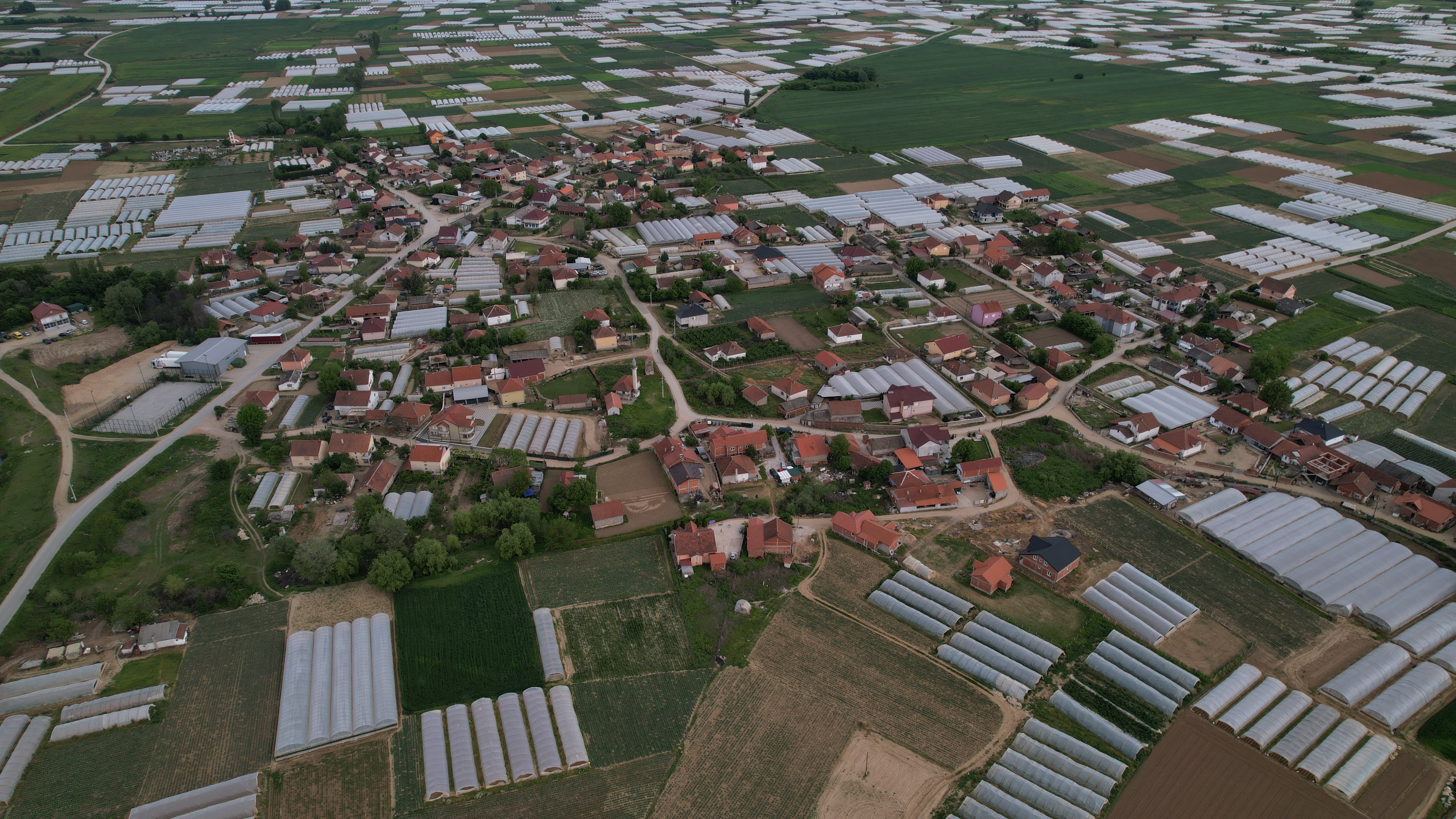
- Air view of the village

- Location within North Macedonia
- Coordinates: 41.432267°N 22.733195°E
- Country: North Macedonia
- Region: Southeastern
- Municipality: Bosilovo

Population (2002)
  - Total: 678
- Time zone: UTC+1 (CET)
  - Summer (DST): UTC+2 (CEST)
- Car plates: SR
- Website: .

Ednokukjevo (Macedonian: Еднокуќево) is a village in the Bosilovo Municipality of North Macedonia.

== Demographics ==
According to the 2002 census, the village had a total of 678 inhabitants. Ethnic groups in the village include:

- Macedonians 557
- Turks 107
- Others 14
