= Stuka (disambiguation) =

Stuka, a German contraction of Sturzkampfflugzeug 'dive bomber', usually refers to the German Junkers Ju 87 dive bomber of World War II.

Stuka or Stukas may also refer to:

== Arts and entertainment ==
- Stukas (film), a 1941 German war propaganda film
- Orchestre Stukas, also known as the Stukas, a Congolese band of the 1970s
- Stuka, a German Rock Against Communism band active 1990-1992
- Stuka, a character in the Sin City series of stories

== People ==
- Stuka Jr. (born 1979), Mexican luchador enmascarado (masked professional wrestler)
- Luiz Carlos Guedes Stukas (born 1980), Brazilian footballer

== Other uses ==
- Štuka, a village in North Macedonia
- Stuka (horse), an American racehorse

== See also ==
- Wurfrahmen 40, a German World War II rocket launcher nicknamed the "Walking Stuka"
- Shtuka, a sort of generalization of the mathematical Drinfeld module
