= Ilovica, North Macedonia =

Ilovica
- Иловица
- Location within North Macedonia
- Coordinates: 41°28′14″N 22°47′55″E
- Country: North Macedonia
- Region: Southeastern
- Municipality: Bosilovo

Population (2021)
  - Total: 1,551
- Climate: BSh

Ilovica (Macedonian: Иловица) is a village in the municipality of Bosilovo, North Macedonia.

== Demographics ==
According to the national census of 2002, the village had a total of 1,907 inhabitants. Ethnic groups in the municipality include:

- Macedonians : 1 611
- Turks : 239
- Romanis : 19
- Serbs : 1
- Others : 37

As of 2021, the village of Ilovica has 1.551 inhabitants and the ethnic composition was the following:

- Macedonians – 1.041
- Albanians – 2
- Turks – 297
- Romani - 9
- others – 5
- Person without Data - 197
