= Drvoš =

Drvoš Дрвош
- Village
- Location within North Macedonia
- Country: North Macedonia
- Region: Southeastern
- Municipality: Bosilovo

Population (2002)
  - Total: 699
- Time zone: UTC+1 (CET)
  - Summer (DST): UTC+2 (CEST)
- Car plates: SR
- Website: .

Drvoš (Macedonian: Дрвош) is a village in the municipality of Bosilovo, North Macedonia.

== Demographics ==
According to the 2002 census, the village had a total of 699 inhabitants. Ethnic groups in the village include:

- Macedonians 699
