= Manush =

Manush may refer to:

- Manush: Child of Destiny, a 2023 Indian Bengali-language action thriller film

== People ==
=== Surname ===
- Frank Manush (1883–1965), American Major League Baseball third baseman
- Heinie Manush (1901–1971), American Major League Baseball left fielder
- Piyush Manush, Indian environmental activist

=== Given name ===
- Manush Georgiev (aka Manush Voivoda) (1881–1908), Bulgarian revolutionary
- Manush Myftiu (1919–1997), Albanian politician
- Manush Nandan, Indian cinematographer
- Manush Peshkëpia, poet killed in the 1951 executions in Albania

== See also ==
- Romani people in France, or manouches
