= Monospitovo =

Monospitovo Моноспитово
- Village
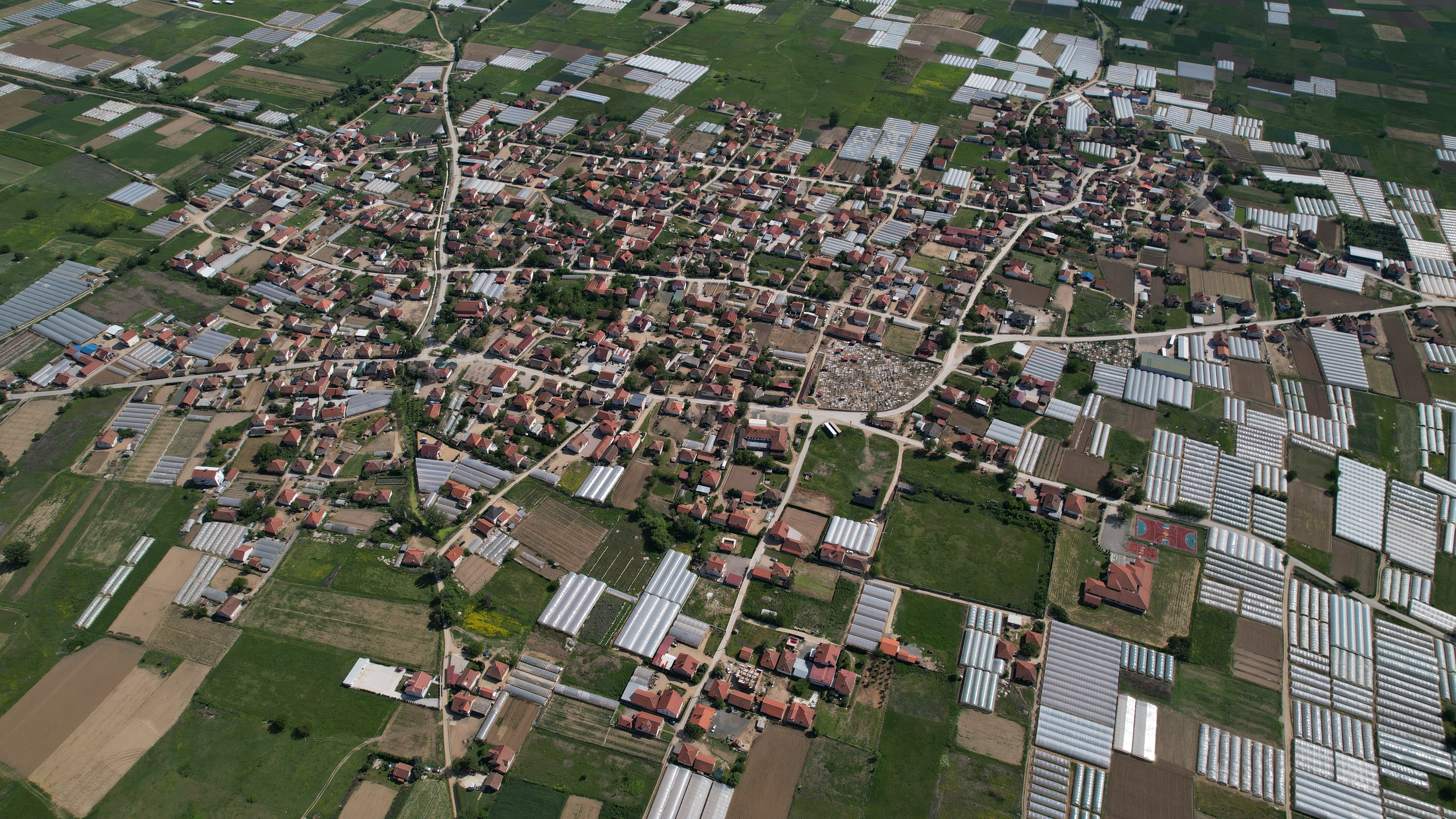
- Air view of the village

- Location within North Macedonia
- Country: North Macedonia
- Region: Southeastern
- Municipality: Bosilovo

Population (2021)
  - Total: 1,324
- Time zone: UTC+1 (CET)
  - Summer (DST): UTC+2 (CEST)
- Car plates: SR
- Website: .

Monospitovo (Macedonian: Моноспитово) is a village in the municipality of Bosilovo, North Macedonia. It used to be part of the former municipality of Murtino. It has about 750 houses and most of the people live permanently abroad.

== Demographics ==
According to the 2002 census, the village had a total of 1,803 inhabitants. Ethnic groups in the village include:

- Macedonians 1,799
- Turks 1
- Serbs 2
- Others 1

As of 2021, the village of Monospitovo has 1.324 inhabitants and the ethnic composition was the following:

- Macedonians – 1.241
- Albanians – 1
- Serbs – 1
- others – 1
- Person without Data - 80
