= Sekirnik =

Sekirnik Секирник
- Village
- Location within North Macedonia
- Country: North Macedonia
- Region: Southeastern
- Municipality: Bosilovo

Population (2002)
  - Total: 1,194
- Time zone: UTC+1 (CET)
  - Summer (DST): UTC+2 (CEST)
- Car plates: SR
- Website: .

Sekirnik (Macedonian: Секирник) is a village in the municipality of Bosilovo, North Macedonia.

== Demographics ==
According to the 2002 census, the village had a total of 1,194 inhabitants. Ethnic groups in the village include:

- Macedonians 1,193
- Others 1

As of 2021, the village of Sekirnik has 871 inhabitants and the ethnic composition was the following:

- Macedonians – 801
- others – 1
- Person without Data - 68
