= Budinarci =

Budinarci Будинарци
- Village
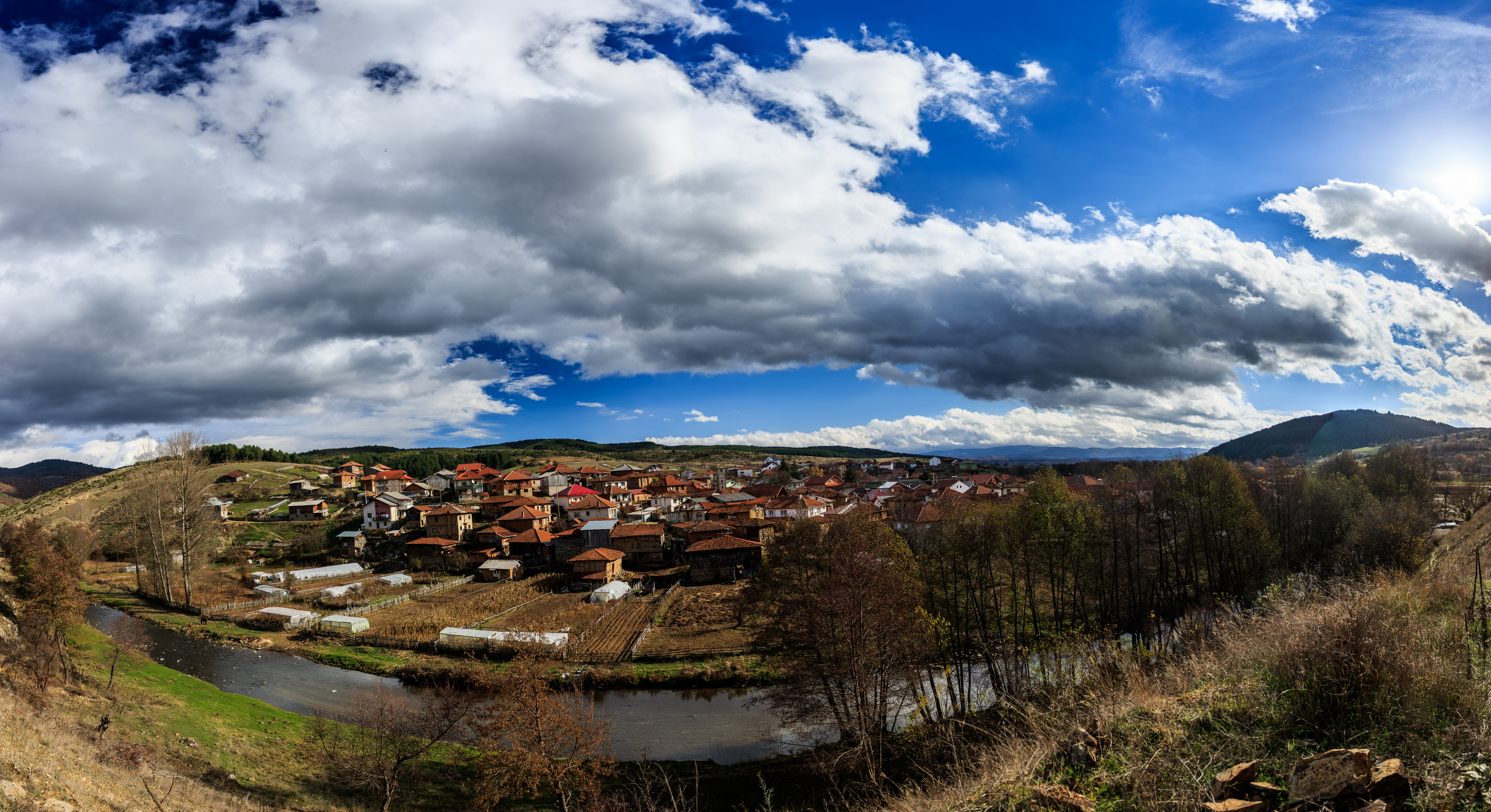
- Panoramic view of Budinarci

- Location within North Macedonia
- Coordinates: 41°45′49″N 22°46′28″E
- Country: North Macedonia
- Region: Eastern
- Municipality: Berovo
- Elevation: 848 m (2,782 ft)

Population (2002)
  - Total: 682
- Time zone: UTC+1 (CET)
- Postal code: 2332
- Area code: +389/33

Budinarci (Macedonian: Будинарци) is a village in North Macedonia. It is located in the Berovo Municipality.

== Demographics ==
According to the 2002 census, the village had a total of 682 inhabitants. Ethnic groups in the village include:

- Macedonians 681
- Serbs 1
