= Bosilovo Municipality =

Municipality of North Macedonia

Coordinates: 41.43°N 22.75°E

Bosilovo Municipality Општина Босилово
- Rural municipality
- Flag Coat of arms

- Country: North Macedonia
- Region: Southeastern
- Municipal seat: Bosilovo

Government
  - Mayor: Risto Manchev

Area
  - Total: 161.99 km^{2} (62.54 sq mi)

Population
  - Total: 11,508
- Time zone: UTC+1 (CET)
- Vehicle registration: SR
- Website: www.opstinabosilovo.gov.mk

Map of Bosilovo Municipality with its villages and their areas.

Bosilovo (Macedonian: Општина Босилово, Opština Bosilovo) is a municipality in the southeast of North Macedonia. The village of Bosilovo is the municipal seat. Bosilovo Municipality is one of the ten municipalities that compose the Southeastern Statistical Region.

== Geography ==
The municipality borders Vasilevo Municipality to the northwest, Berovo Municipality to the northeast, Novo Selo Municipality to the southeast, and Strumica Municipality to the southwest.

== Demographics ==
According to the 2021 North Macedonia census, this municipality has a population of 11,508. Ethnic groups in the municipality include:

	2002		2021	
	Number	%	Number	%
TOTAL	14,260	100	11,508	100
Macedonians	13,649	95.7	9,762	84.83
Turks	495	3.5	677	5.88
Roma	24	0.17	16	0.14
Albanians			7	0.06
Serbs	8	0.06	6	0.05
Other / Undeclared / Unknown	84	0.58	15	0.13
Persons for whom data are taken from administrative sources			1,025	8.91

Bosilovo Municipality, like neighboring Vasilovo, is notable for its higher concentration of Catholics than is typical for Macedonia which is overall mostly Orthodox and Muslim. In 2002, it was found that there were 959 Catholics, or 7.7% of the municipality's total population. Most of these Catholics are found in the towns of Radovo (where 823 Catholics make up 96.7% of all residents) and Petralinci (where 105 Catholics make up 17.4% of all residents).

== Inhabited places ==
The municipality comprises 16 villages: Borievo, Bosilovo, Gečerlija, Drvoš, Ednokukjevo, Ilovica, Monospitovo, Petralinci, Radovo, Robovo, Saraj, Sekirnik, Staro Baldovci, Turnovo, Hamzali and Štuka.
