= Staro Baldovci =

Staro Baldovci Старо Балдовци
- Village
- Location within North Macedonia
- Country: North Macedonia
- Region: Southeastern
- Municipality: Bosilovo

Population (2021)
  - Total: 422
- Time zone: UTC+1 (CET)
  - Summer (DST): UTC+2 (CEST)
- Car plates: SR
- Website: .

Staro Baldovci (Macedonian: Старо Балдовци) is a village in the municipality of Bosilovo, North Macedonia.

== Demographics ==
As of the 2021 census, Staro Baldovci had 422 residents with the following ethnic composition:

- Turks 222
- Persons for whom data are taken from administrative sources 109
- Macedonians 90
- Roma 1

According to the 2002 census, the village had a total of 269 inhabitants. Ethnic groups in the village include:

- Macedonians 116
- Turks 124
- Romani 5
- Others 24
