= Nova Maala =

Nova Maala Нова Mаала
- Location within North Macedonia
- Country: North Macedonia
- Region: Southeastern
- Municipality: Vasilevo

Population (2021)
  - Total: 893
- Time zone: UTC+1 (CET)
  - Summer (DST): UTC+2 (CEST)

Nova Maala (Macedonian: Нова Mаала) is a village in the municipality of Vasilevo, North Macedonia. Most of the inhabitants of the village are Macedonian Catholics of Eastern Rite.

== Demographics ==
As of the 2021 census, Nova Maala had 893 residents with the following ethnic composition:

- Macedonians 546
- Persons for whom data are taken from administrative sources 271
- Turks 76

According to the 2002 census, the village had a total of 823 inhabitants. Ethnic groups in the village include:

- Macedonians 679
- Turks 142
- Bosniaks 1
- Others 1
