= Umlena =

Umlena Умлена
- Village
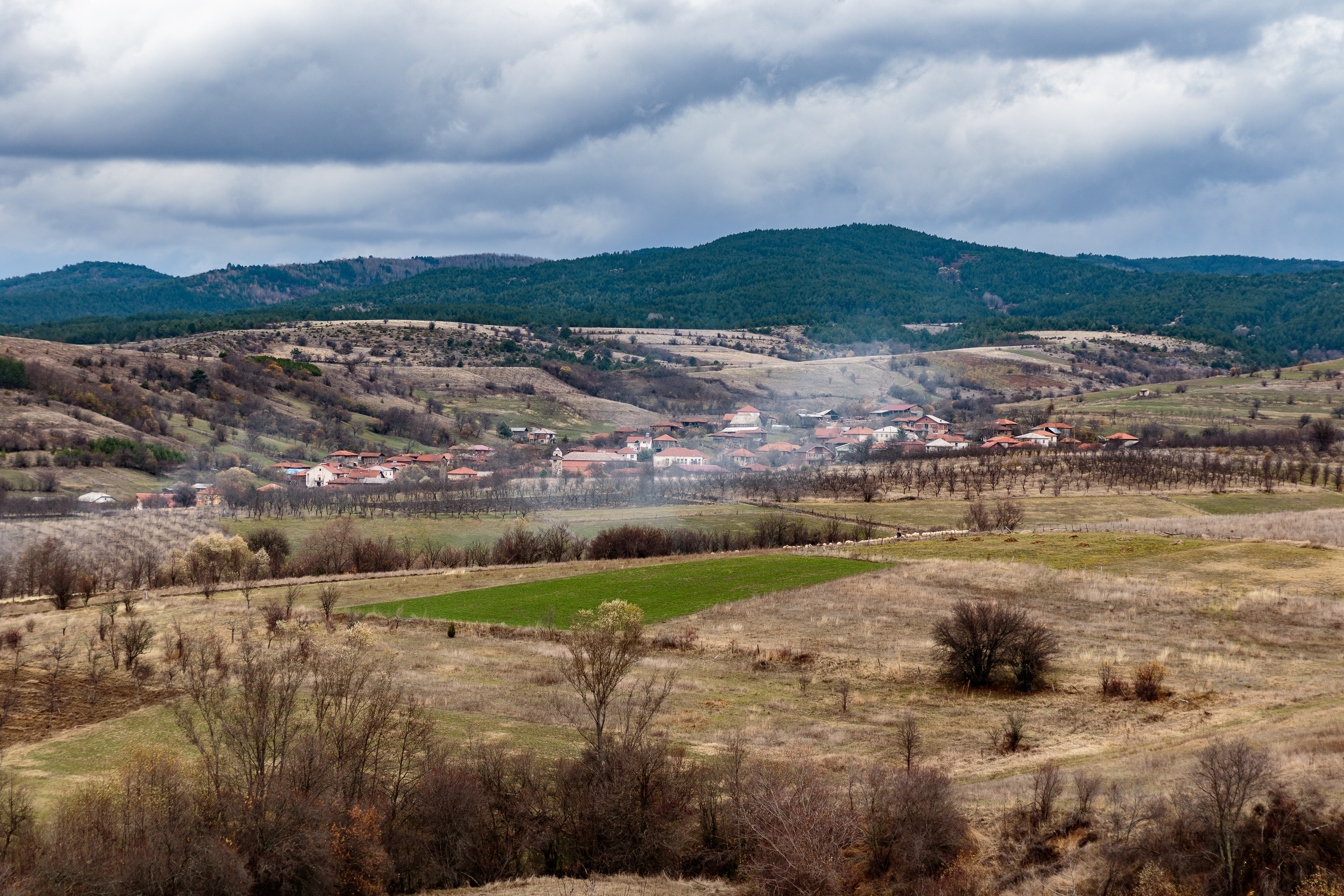
- View of the village

- Location within North Macedonia
- Coordinates: 41.769784°N 22.836980°E
- Country: North Macedonia
- Region: Eastern
- Municipality: Pehčevo

Population (2002)
  - Total: 354
- Time zone: UTC+1 (CET)
  - Summer (DST): UTC+2 (CEST)
- Website: .

Umlena (Macedonian: Умлена) is a village in the municipality of Pehčevo, North Macedonia.

== Etymology ==
Toponym derives from Proto-Slavic *xъlmъ, meaning a hill.

== Demographics ==
According to the 2002 census, the village had a total of 354 inhabitants. Ethnic groups in the village include:

- Macedonians 354
