= Pehčevo Municipality =

Municipality of North Macedonia

Coordinates: 41.76°N 22.88°E

Pehčevo Municipality Општина Пехчево
- Rural municipality
- Flag Coat of arms

- Country: North Macedonia
- Region: Eastern
- Municipal seat: Pehčevo

Government
  - Mayor: Aleksandar Kitanski (VMRO-DPMNE)

Area
  - Total: 207 km^{2} (80 sq mi)

Population
  - Total: 3,983
  - Density: 19.2/km^{2} (49.8/sq mi)
- Time zone: UTC+1 (CET)
- Postal code: 2326
- Area code: 033
- Vehicle registration: PE
- Website: http://www.opstinapehcevo.gov.mk/

Pehčevo Municipality (Macedonian: Општина Пехчево [ˈpɛxtʃɛvɔ]) is a municipality in the eastern part of North Macedonia. Pehčevo is also the name of the town where the municipal seat is located. This municipality is part of the Eastern Statistical Region.

== Basic information ==
The Pehčevo Municipality is located in the eastern part of North Macedonia between

- 41°06' and 41°53' latitude and
- 22°37' and 23°12' longitude.

It is bordered

- to the east by the town of Sandanski in Bulgaria,
- to the south and west by the Berovo Municipality and
- to the north by the Delčevo Municipality.

The municipality has a moderate continental climate with a change in climate in the higher mountain and lowland parts.

The terrain is mainly hilly or mountainous, with lowland terrains.

== Demographics ==
According to the 2021 North Macedonia census, this municipality has 3,983 inhabitants. It is the least populated urban municipality of North Macedonia.

=== Inhabited places and number of inhabitants by place in 2002 ===
- Pehčevo = 3,193
- Umlena = 319
- Robovo = 385
- Čiflik = 309
- Pančarevo = 395
- Negrevo = 122
- Crnik = 794
- Spikovo = unknown
- TOTAL = 5,517

=== Ethnic groups in the Municipality of Pehčevo ===
	2002		2021	
	Number	%	Number	%
TOTAL	5,517	100	3,983	100
Macedonians	4,737	85.86	3,233	81.17
Turks	357	6.47	280	7.03
Roma	390	7.07	256	6.43
Serbs	12	0.22	10	0.25
Albanians			1	0.03
Vlachs	2	0.04	1	0.03
Bosniaks			1	0.03
Other / Undeclared / Unknown	19	0.34	32	0.79
Persons for whom data are taken from administrative sources			169	4.24

== Employment and Unemployment ==
=== Employed ===
- Male = 885
- Female = 485
- Total employed = 1,370

=== Unemployed ===
- Male = 458
- Female = 451
- Total unemployed = 909

== Agriculture and Rural Development ==
=== Agriculture ===
==== Livestock by inhabitant place ====
===== Cattle =====
- Pehčevo = 190
- Robovo = 510
- Umlena = 194
- Pančarevo = 276
- Crnik = 100
- Negrevo = 138
- Čiflik = 144

===== Sheep =====
- Pehčevo = 3000
- Robovo = 1400
- Umlena = 1441
- Pančarevo = 1850
- Crnik = 2130
- Negrevo = 1120
- Čiflik = 631

===== Poultry =====
- Pehčevo = 977
- Robovo = 1755
- Umlena = 1234
- Pančarevo = 2124
- Crnik = 836
- Negrevo = 617
- Čiflik = 944

===== Goats =====
- Pehčevo = 170
- Robovo = 100
- Umlena = 60
- Pančarevo = 100
- Crnik = 124
- Negrevo = 50
- Čiflik = 60

==== Orchards by inhabitant place ====
===== Plums =====
- Pehčevo = 17000
- Robovo = 7000
- Umlena = 6000
- Pančarevo = 11000
- Crnik = 12000
- Negrevo = 9000
- Čiflik = 6000

===== Apples =====
- Pehčevo = 3200
- Robovo = 2000
- Umlena = 1600
- Pančarevo = 5300
- Crnik = 5300
- Negrevo = 400
- Čiflik = 1300

===== Cherries =====
- Pehčevo = 150
- Robovo = 50
- Umlena = 70
- Pančarevo = 1000
- Crnik = 1000
- Negrevo = 70
- Čiflik = 30

===== Sour cherries =====
- Pehčevo = 1200
- Robovo = 50
- Umlena = 500
- Pančarevo = 400
- Crnik = 400
- Negrevo = /
- Čiflik = 400

===== Pears =====
- Pehčevo = 150
- Robovo = 400
- Umlena = 300
- Pančarevo = 800
- Crnik = 800
- Negrevo = 80
- Čiflik = 80

===== Quinces =====
- Pehčevo = /
- Robovo = /
- Umlena = /
- Pančarevo = /
- Crnik = /
- Negrevo = 10
- Čiflik = /

===== Walnuts =====
- Pehčevo = 100
- Robovo = 20
- Umlena = 50
- Pančarevo = 800
- Crnik = 800
- Negrevo = 100
- Čiflik = 20
