= Čiflik, Pehčevo =

Čiflik Чифлик
- Village
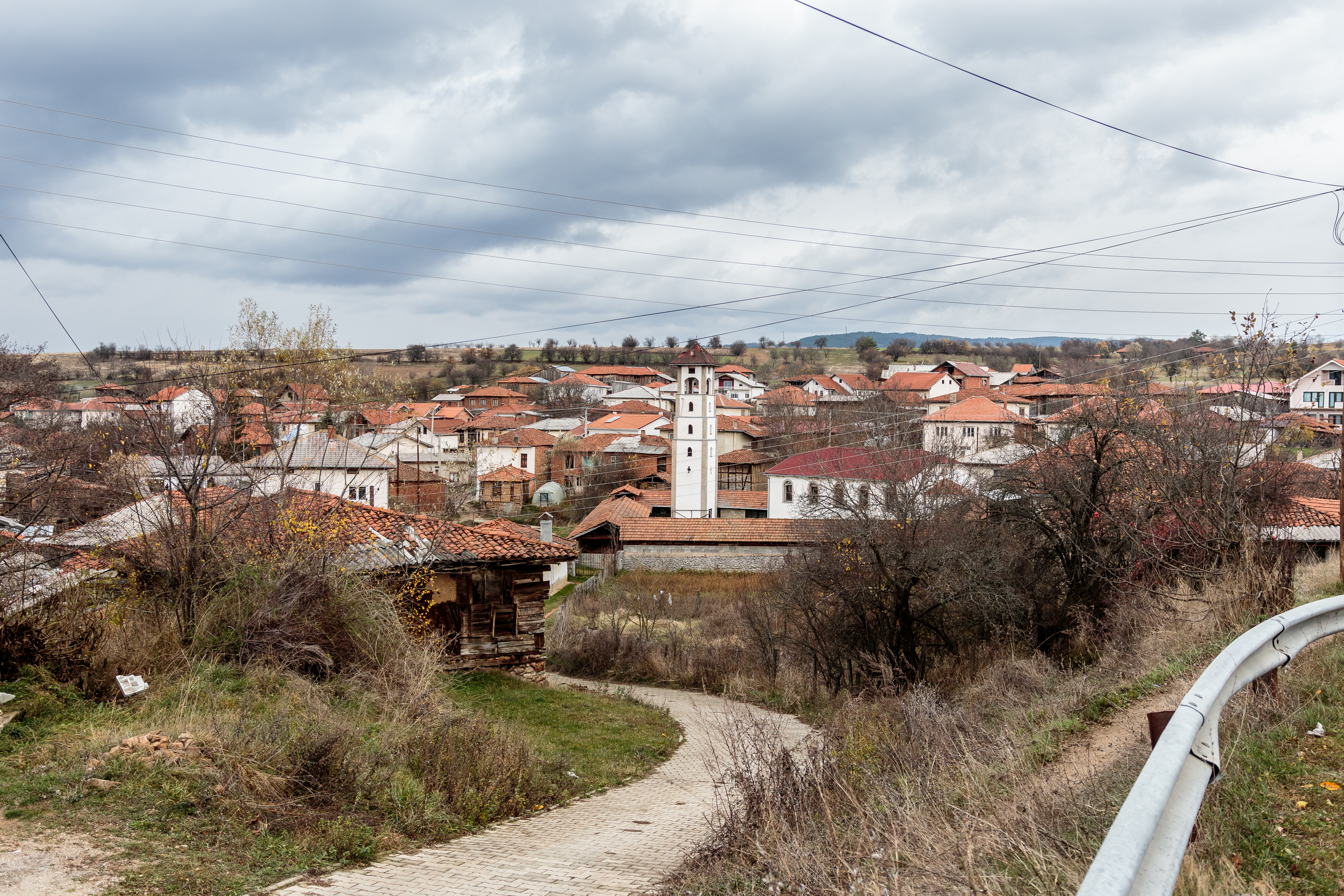
- View of the village

- Location within North Macedonia
- Coordinates: 41.761221°N 22.856036°E
- Country: North Macedonia
- Region: Eastern
- Municipality: Pehčevo

Population (2002)
  - Total: 321
- Time zone: UTC+1 (CET)
  - Summer (DST): UTC+2 (CEST)
- Website: .

Čiflik (Macedonian: Чифлик) is a village in the municipality of Pehčevo, North Macedonia.

== Demographics ==
According to the statistics of Bulgarian ethnographer Vasil Kanchov from 1900 the settlement is recorded as Čifliko as having 357 inhabitants, all Bulgarian Exarchists. According to the 2002 census, the village had a total of 321 inhabitants. Ethnic groups in the village include:

- Macedonians 319
- Serbs 2
