= Crnik =

Crnik Црник
- Village
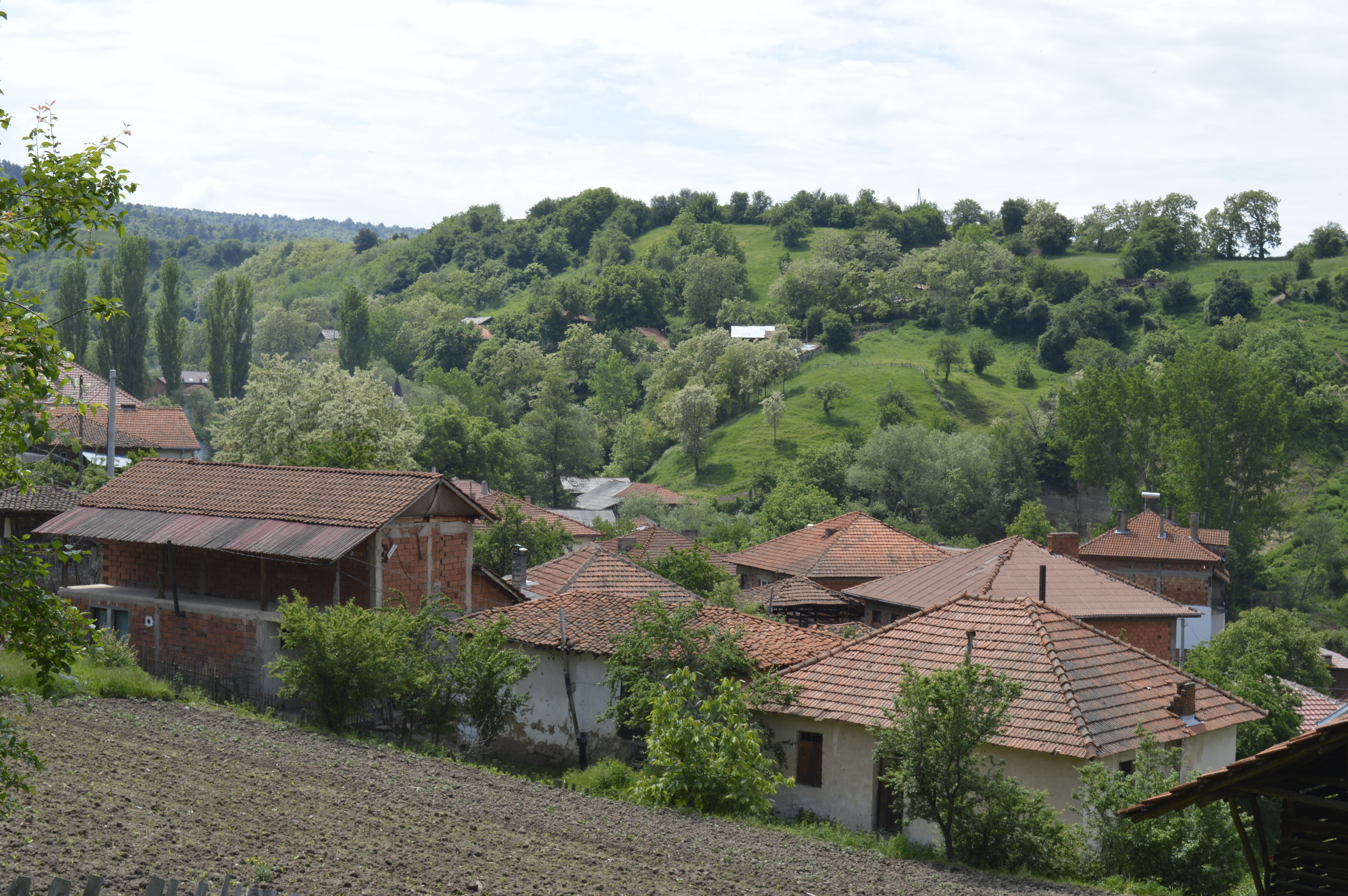
- View of the village

- Location within North Macedonia
- Coordinates: 41.821451°N 22.881531°E
- Country: North Macedonia
- Region: Eastern
- Municipality: Pehčevo

Population (2002)
  - Total: 707
- Time zone: UTC+1 (CET)
  - Summer (DST): UTC+2 (CEST)
- Website: .

Crnik (Macedonian: Црник) is a village in the municipality of Pehčevo, North Macedonia. It is located close to the Bulgarian border.

== Demographics ==
According to the 2002 census, the village had a total of 707 inhabitants. Ethnic groups in the village include:

- Macedonians 103
- Turks 326
- Serbs 4
- Romani 267
- Others 7
