= Pančarevo =

Pančarevo Панчарево
- Village
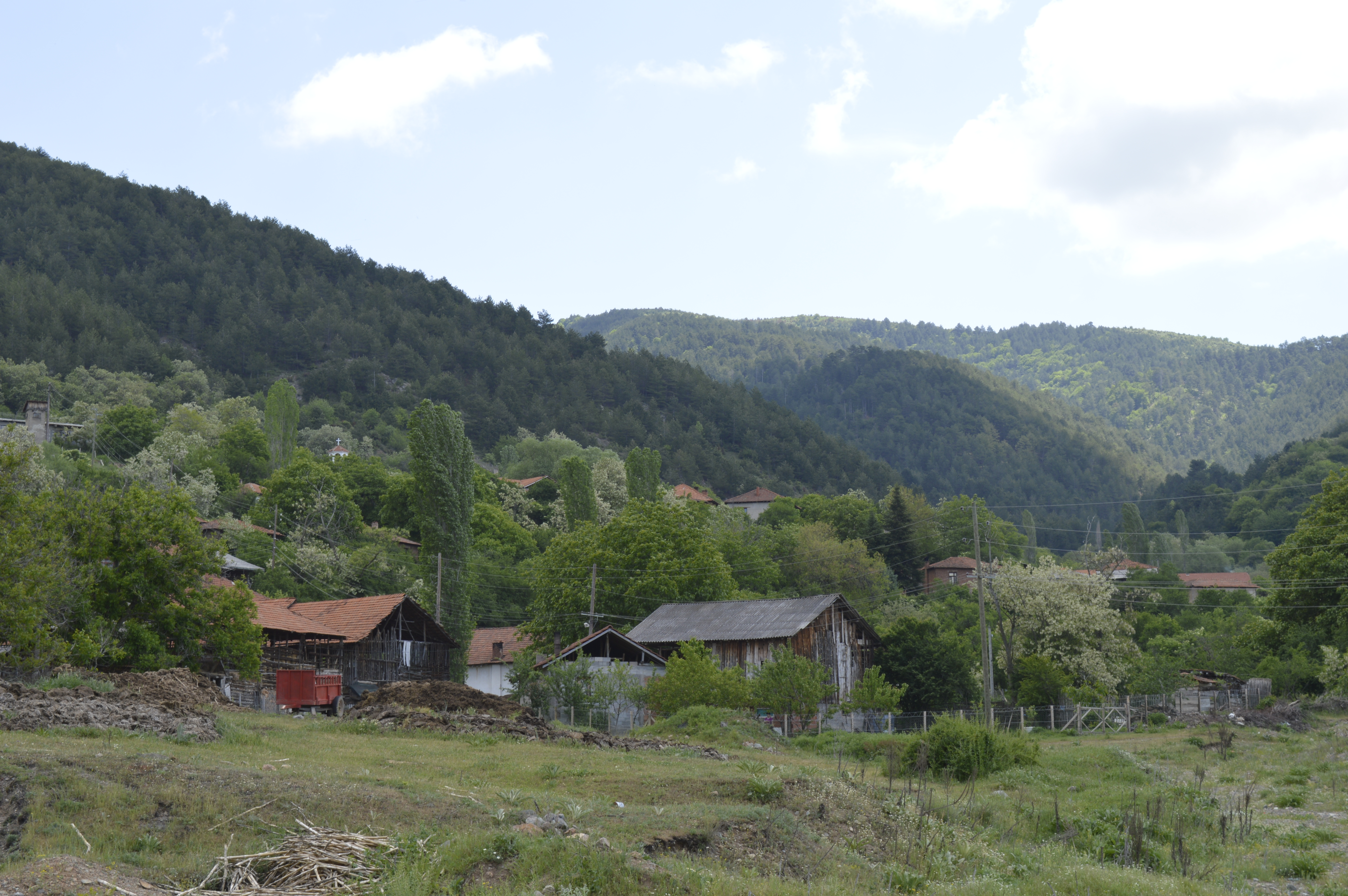
- View of the village

- Location within North Macedonia
- Coordinates: 41.857722°N 22.902495°E
- Country: North Macedonia
- Region: Eastern
- Municipality: Pehčevo

Population (2002)
  - Total: 375
- Time zone: UTC+1 (CET)
  - Summer (DST): UTC+2 (CEST)
- Website: .

Pančarevo (Macedonian: Панчарево) is a village in the municipality of Pehčevo, North Macedonia. It is located close to the Bulgarian border.

== Demographics ==
According to the 2002 census, the village had a total of 375 inhabitants. Ethnic groups in the village include:

- Macedonians 375
