= Pehčevo =

Town in Eastern, North Macedonia

Pehčevo Пехчево (Macedonian)
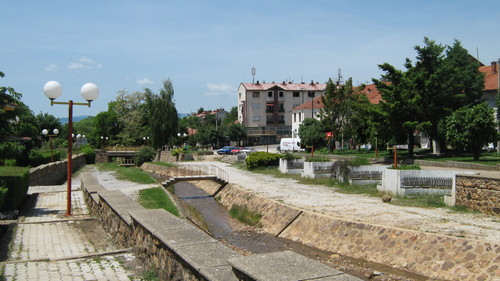

- Flag Seal

- Location within North Macedonia
- Coordinates: 41°45′46.8″N 22°53′16.8″E
- Country: North Macedonia
- Region: Eastern
- Municipality: Pehčevo

Government
  - Mayor: Aleksandar Kitanski (VMRO-DPMNE)

Population (2002)
  - Total: 3,237
- Time zone: UTC+1 (CET)
  - Summer (DST): UTC+2 (CEST)
- Postal code: 2326
- Area code: +389
- Vehicle registration: PE
- Climate: Cfb
- Website: https://pehcevo.gov.mk

Pehčevo (Macedonian: Пехчево, [ˈpɛxtʃɛvɔ]) is a small town in the eastern part of North Macedonia. It is the seat of Pehčevo Municipality. Pehčevo is known for its winter tourism.

== History ==
In the late 19th and early 20th century, Pehčevo was part of the Kosovo Vilayet of the Ottoman Empire. According to the statistics of Bulgarian ethnographer Vasil Kanchov from 1900, 4,070 inhabitants lived in Pehčevo (Pehchovo), 3,300 Bulgarian Muslims, 700 Bulgarian Christians and 70 Romani.

In 1913, as a result of the Balkan Wars, the town became a part of the Kingdom of Serbia, which in 1918 joined the Kingdom of Serbs, Croats and Slovenes (in 1929 renamed Kingdom of Yugoslavia).

In 1922 many Gallipoli Serbs, adherents of the Patriarchate of Constantinople, arrived in Yugoslavia as refugees from Gelibolu and part of them were resettled here. Their number in Pehčevo was ca 1,100

From 1929 to 1941, Pehčevo was part of the Vardar Banovina of the Kingdom of Yugoslavia.

From 1941 to 1944, during the Axis occupation of Yugoslavia, Pehčevo, along with most of Vardar Macedonia, was annexed by the Kingdom of Bulgaria.

== Demographics ==
According to the 2002 census, the town had a total of 3,237 inhabitants. Ethnic groups in the town include:

- Macedonians 3,067
- Turks 31
- Serbs 6
- Romani 123
- Aromanians 2
- Others 8

== Sports ==
Local football club FK Pehchevo play in the Macedonian Second League (East Division).
