= Štuka =

Štuka Штука
- Village
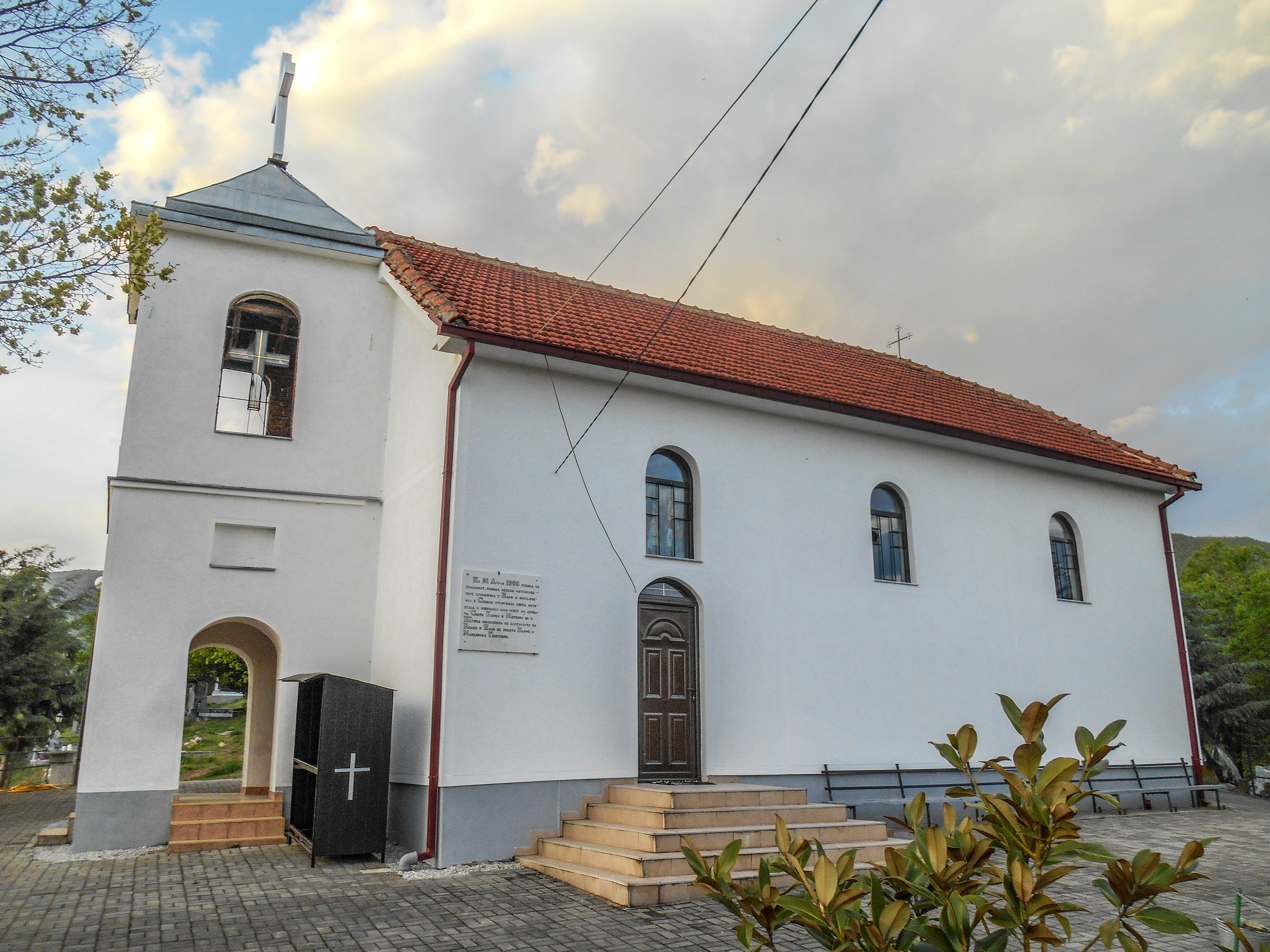
- Saints Cyril and Methodius Church in Štuka

- Location within North Macedonia
- Coordinates: 41°28′05″N 22°48′35″E
- Country: North Macedonia
- Region: Southeastern
- Municipality: Bosilovo

Population (2021)
  - Total: 590
- Time zone: UTC+1 (CET)
  - Summer (DST): UTC+2 (CEST)
- Car plates: SR
- Website: .

Štuka (Macedonian: Штука) is a village in the municipality of Bosilovo, North Macedonia.

== Demographics ==
According to the 2002 census, the village had a total of 781 inhabitants. Ethnic groups in the village include:

- Macedonians – 781

As of 2021, the village of Shtuka has 590 inhabitants and the ethnic composition was the following:

- Macedonians – 561
- Persons without Data – 29
