= Robovo, Pehčevo =

Village in Pehčevo Municipality, North Macedonia

Robovo Робово
- Village
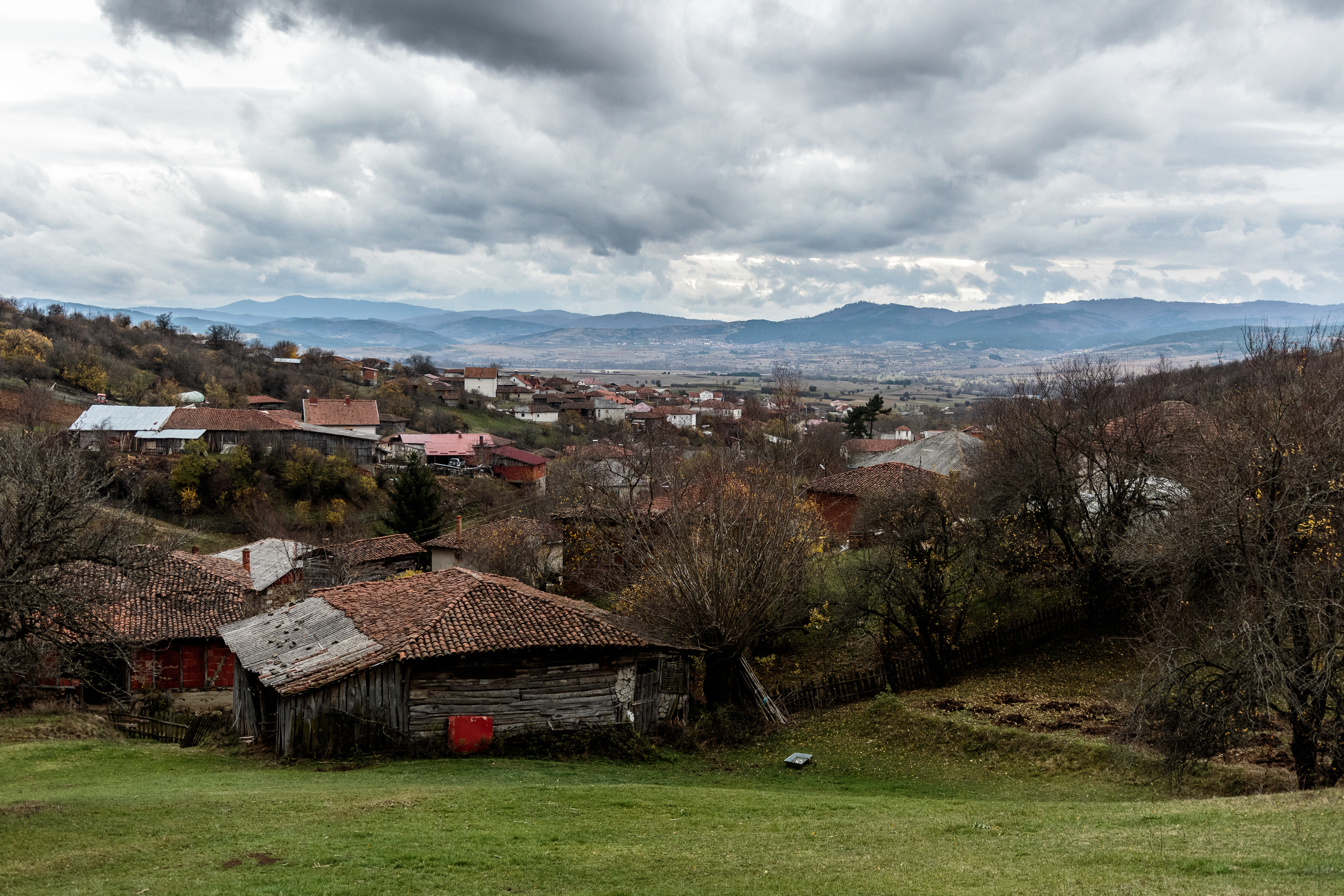
- View of the village

- Location within North Macedonia
- Coordinates: 41.765759°N 22.821776°E
- Country: North Macedonia
- Region: Eastern
- Municipality: Pehčevo

Population (2002)
  - Total: 426
- Time zone: UTC+1 (CET)
  - Summer (DST): UTC+2 (CEST)
- Website: .

Robovo (Macedonian: Робово) is a village in the municipality of Pehčevo, North Macedonia.

== Demographics ==
According to the 2002 census, the village had a total of 426 inhabitants. Ethnic groups in the village include:

- Macedonians 422
- Others 4
