= Robovo, Bosilovo =

Robovo Робово
- Village
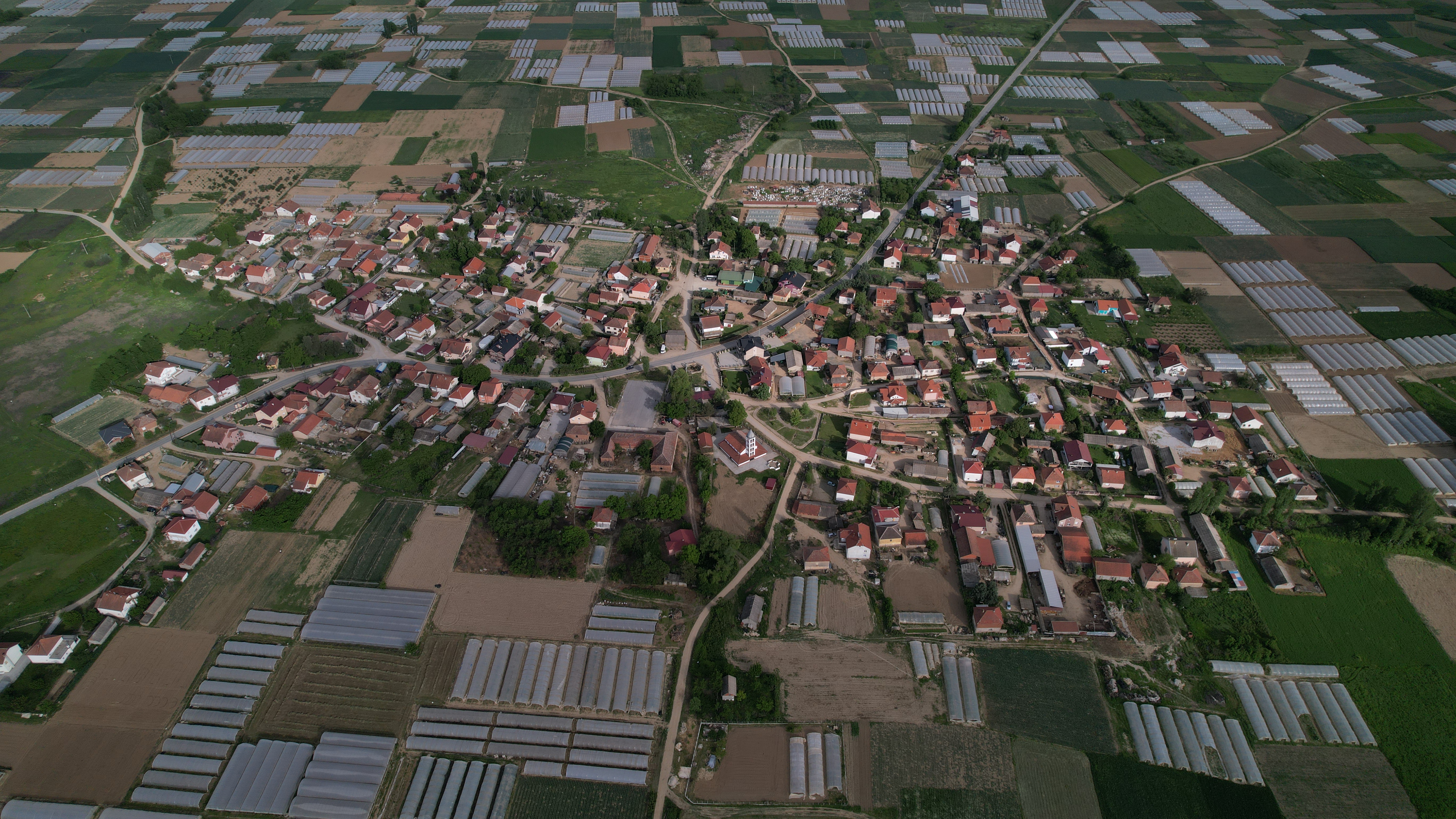
- Air view of the village

- Location within North Macedonia
- Country: North Macedonia
- Region: Southeastern
- Municipality: Bosilovo

Population (2002)
  - Total: 576
- Time zone: UTC+1 (CET)
  - Summer (DST): UTC+2 (CEST)
- Car plates: SR
- Website: .

Robovo (Macedonian: Робово) is a village in the municipality of Bosilovo, North Macedonia.

== Demographics ==
According to the 2002 census, the village had a total of 576 inhabitants. Ethnic groups in the village include:

- Macedonians 574
- Serbs 1
- Others 1

As of 2021, the village of Robovo has 436 inhabitants and the ethnic composition was the following:

- Macedonians – 421
- Person without Data - 15
