= Berovo Municipality =

Municipality of North Macedonia

Coordinates: 41°42′17″N 22°51′12″E

Municipality of Berovo Општина Берово
- Urban municipality
- Flag Coat of arms

- Country: North Macedonia
- Region: Eastern
- Municipal seat: Berovo

Government
  - Mayor: Dzvonko Pekevski (SDSM)

Area
  - Total: 598.7 km^{2} (231.2 sq mi)

Population
  - Total: 10,890
  - Density: 18.19/km^{2} (47.11/sq mi)
- Time zone: UTC+1 (CET)
- Vehicle registration: BE
- Website: www.berovo.gov.mk

Berovo (Macedonian: Берово [ˈbɛrɔvɔ]) is a municipality in the eastern part of the Republic of North Macedonia. Berovo is also the name of the town where the municipal seat is located. The Berovo Municipality is part of the Eastern Statistical Region.

== Geography ==
The municipality borders

- Pehčevo Municipality, Delčevo Municipality, and Vinica Municipality to the north,
- Radoviš Municipality and Vasilevo Municipality to the west,
- Bosilovo Municipality and Novo Selo Municipality to the south, and
- Bulgaria to the east.

== Demographics ==
According to the 2021 North Macedonia census, this municipality has 10,890 inhabitants.

Ethnic groups in the municipality include:

	2002		2021	
	Number	%	Number	%
TOTAL	13,941	100	10,890	100
Macedonians	13,335	95.65	9,925	91.14
Roma	459	3.29	339	3.11
Turks	91	0.65	60	0.55
Serbs	20	0.14	10	0.09
Bosniaks	3	0.02	6	0.08
Vlachs	6	0.04	1	0.01
Albanians			1	0.01
Others / Undeclared / Unknown	27	0.24	46	0.4
Persons for whom data are taken from administrative sources			502	4.61

Demographics of Berovo Municipality
Census year	Population
1994	14,179
2002	13,941
2021	10,890
