= Bosilovo =

Bosilovo Босилово
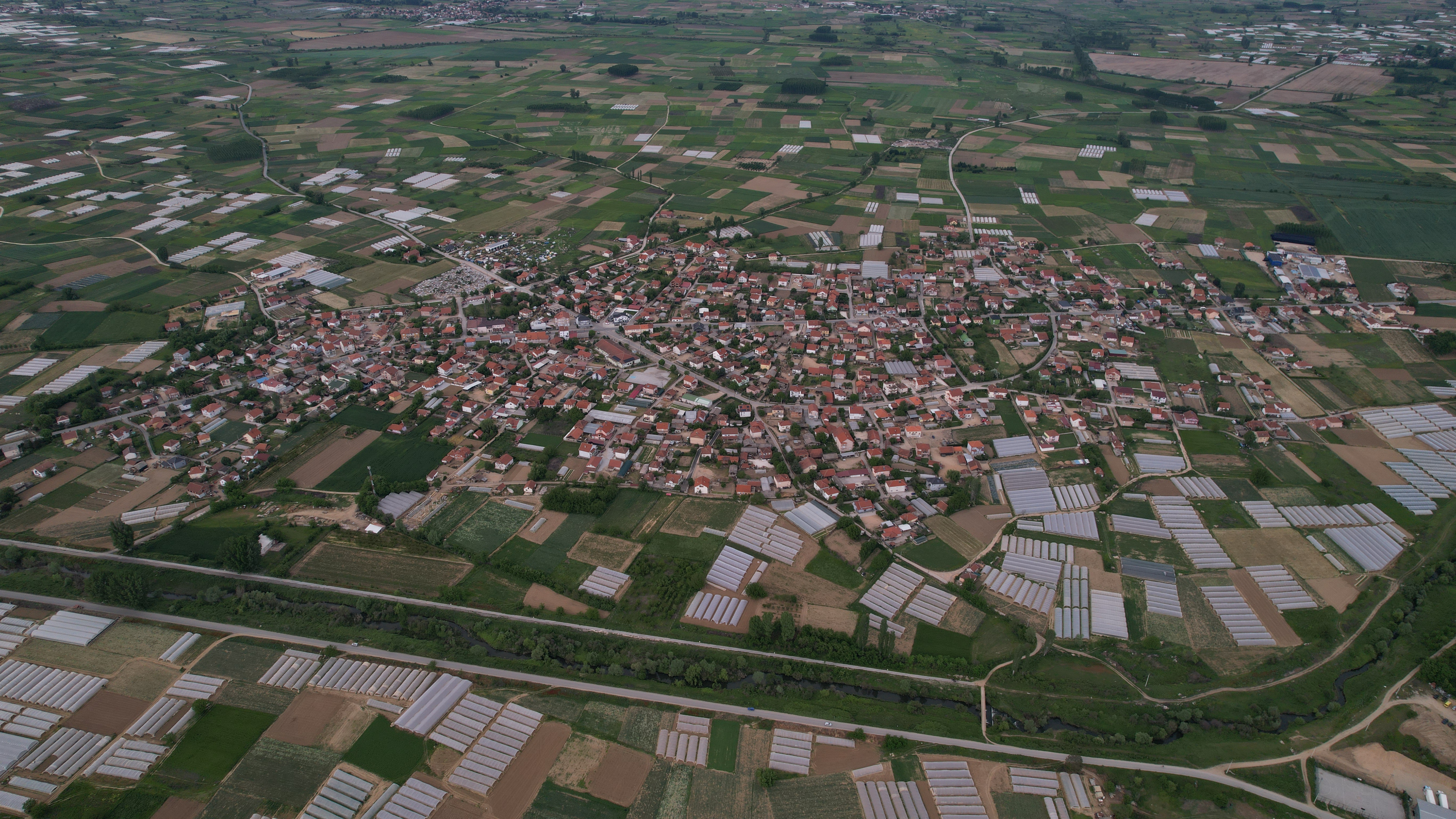
- Air view of the village

- Location within North Macedonia
- Country: North Macedonia
- Region: Southeastern
- Municipality: Bosilovo
- Elevation: 357 m (1,171 ft)

Population (2002)
  - Total: 1,689
- Time zone: UTC+1 (CET)
  - Summer (DST): UTC+2 (CEST)
- Climate: Cfa
- Vehicle registration: SR
- Website: .

Bosilovo (Macedonian: Босилово) is a village in North Macedonia. It is the seat of Bosilovo Municipality.

== Demographics ==
According to the 2002 census, the village had a total of 1698 inhabitants. Ethnic groups in the village include:

- Macedonians 1697
- Others 1

As of 2021, the village of Bosilovo has 1.273 inhabitants and the ethnic composition was the following:

- Macedonians – 1.217
- Serbs – 4
- Person without Data - 52

== See also ==
- Bosilovo Municipality
- Strumica
