= Vasilevo Municipality =

Municipality of North Macedonia

Coordinates: 41.4758°N 22.6417°E

Vasilevo Municipality Општина Василево Vasilevo Belediyesi
- Rural municipality
- Flag Coat of arms

- Country: North Macedonia
- Region: Southeastern

Government
  - Mayor: Slave Andonov (VMRO-DPMNE)

Population
  - Total: 10,552
- Time zone: UTC+1 (CET)
- Vehicle registration: SR

Vasilevo (Macedonian: Василево; Turkish: Vasilevo Belediyesi) is a municipality in the eastern part of North Macedonia. Vasilevo is also the name of the village where the municipal seat is found. Vasilevo Municipality is part of the Southeastern Statistical Region.

== Demographics ==
According to the 2021 North Macedonia census, this municipality has 10,552 inhabitants. Ethnic groups in the municipality include:

	2002		2021	
	Number	%	Number	%
TOTAL	12,122	100	10,552	100
Macedonians	9,958	82.2	6,831	64.7
Turks	2,095	17.3	2,251	21.3
Roma	5	0.04	27	0.26
Serbs	4	0.03	4	0.04
Albanians			3	0.03
Vlachs	1	0.01		
Bosniaks	1	0.01		
Other / Undeclared / Unknown	58	0.48	99	0.93
Persons for whom data are taken from administrative sources			1,337	12.67

=== Demographic Trends ===
- Live births by ethnic affiliation of mother, 2010-2021

	Macedonians		Turks		Albanians		Others		TOTAL
Year	Births	%	Births	%	Births	%	Births	%	Births
2010	114	58.46	80	41.03	0	0.00	1	0.51	195
2011	113	66.08	57	33.33	0	0.00	1	0.58	171
2012	110	63.95	56	32.56	2	1.16	4	2.33	172
2013	124	64.92	63	32.98	3	1.57	1	0.52	191
2014	100	59.52	60	35.71	8	4.76	0	0.00	168
2015	78	59.09	48	36.36	4	3.03	2	1.52	132
2016	87	56.13	55	35.48	9	5.81	4	2.58	155
2017	86	60.14	49	34.27	6	4.20	2	1.40	143
2018	75	58.59	39	30.47	10	7.81	4	3.13	128
2019	62	50.00	54	43.55	5	4.03	3	2.42	124
2020	53	46.90	50	44.25	6	5.31	4	3.54	113
2021	44	42.72	56	54.37	2	1.94	1	0.97	103
2022	45	44.12	50	49.02	4	3.92	3	2.94	102
2023	40	38.46	63	60.58	0	0.00	1	0.96	104

The total number of students in the municipality in 2011, in comparison to the total number of students in 2007, increased for 4.4%. Vasilevo is the third municipality in North Macedonia by rise of the total number of students.

Vasilevo has a higher concentration of Catholics (Eastern) than most municipalities in North Macedonia, with the percentage of Catholic residents standing at 4.8% of the total populace in 2002 according to the census (581 Catholic residents out of 12122 total residents of the municipality). The majority of these Catholic residents, 520 of them, live in the town of Nova Maala, where, out of the total of 823 residents, they make up a majority of 63.2%, followed by the 232 Muslim residents (28.2%).

== Localities ==
- Nova Maala
