= Southeastern Statistical Region =

Coordinates: 41.4300°N 22.6600°E

Southeastern Statistical Region Југоисточен Регион (Macedonian)
- Statistical region
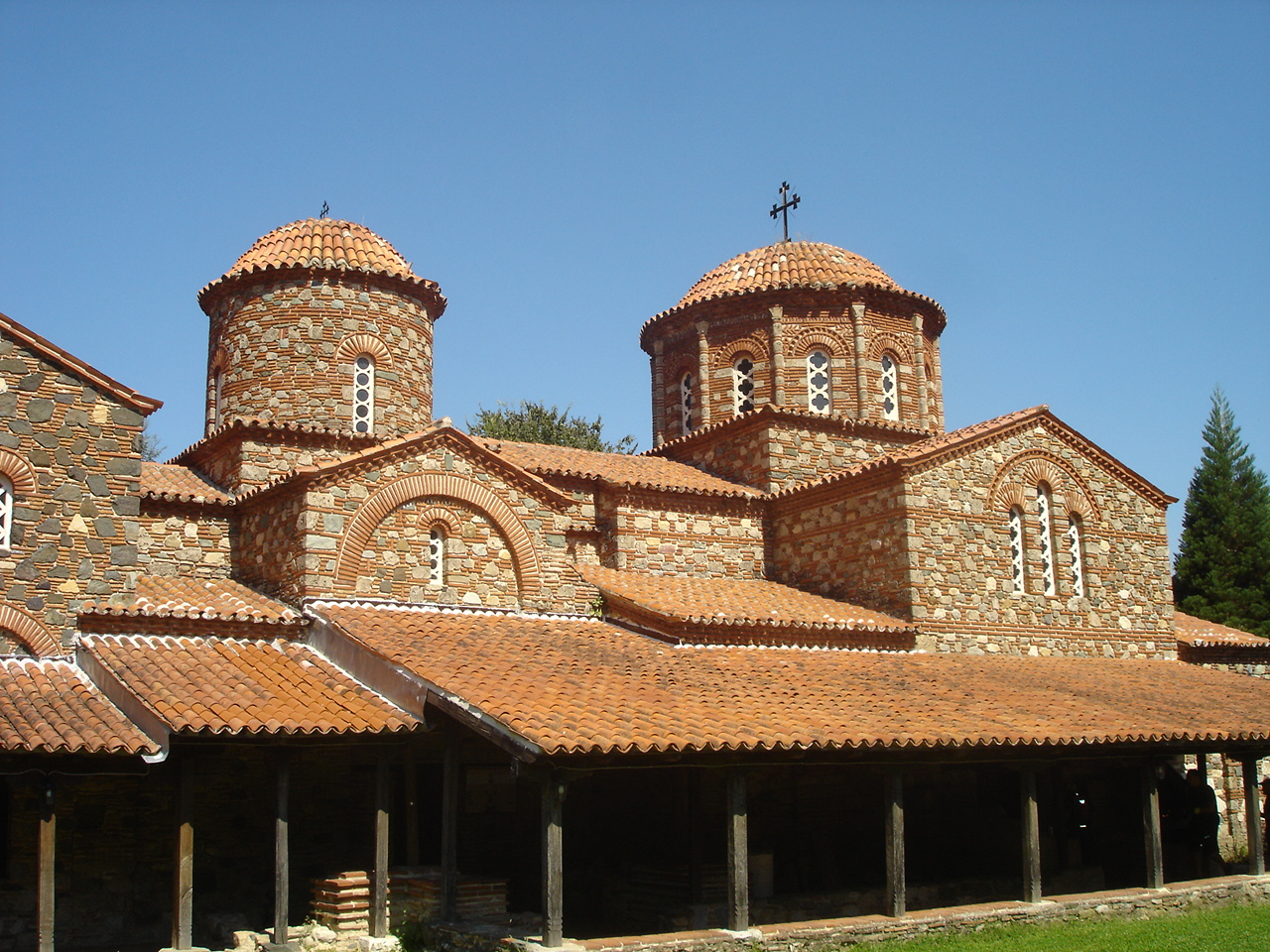
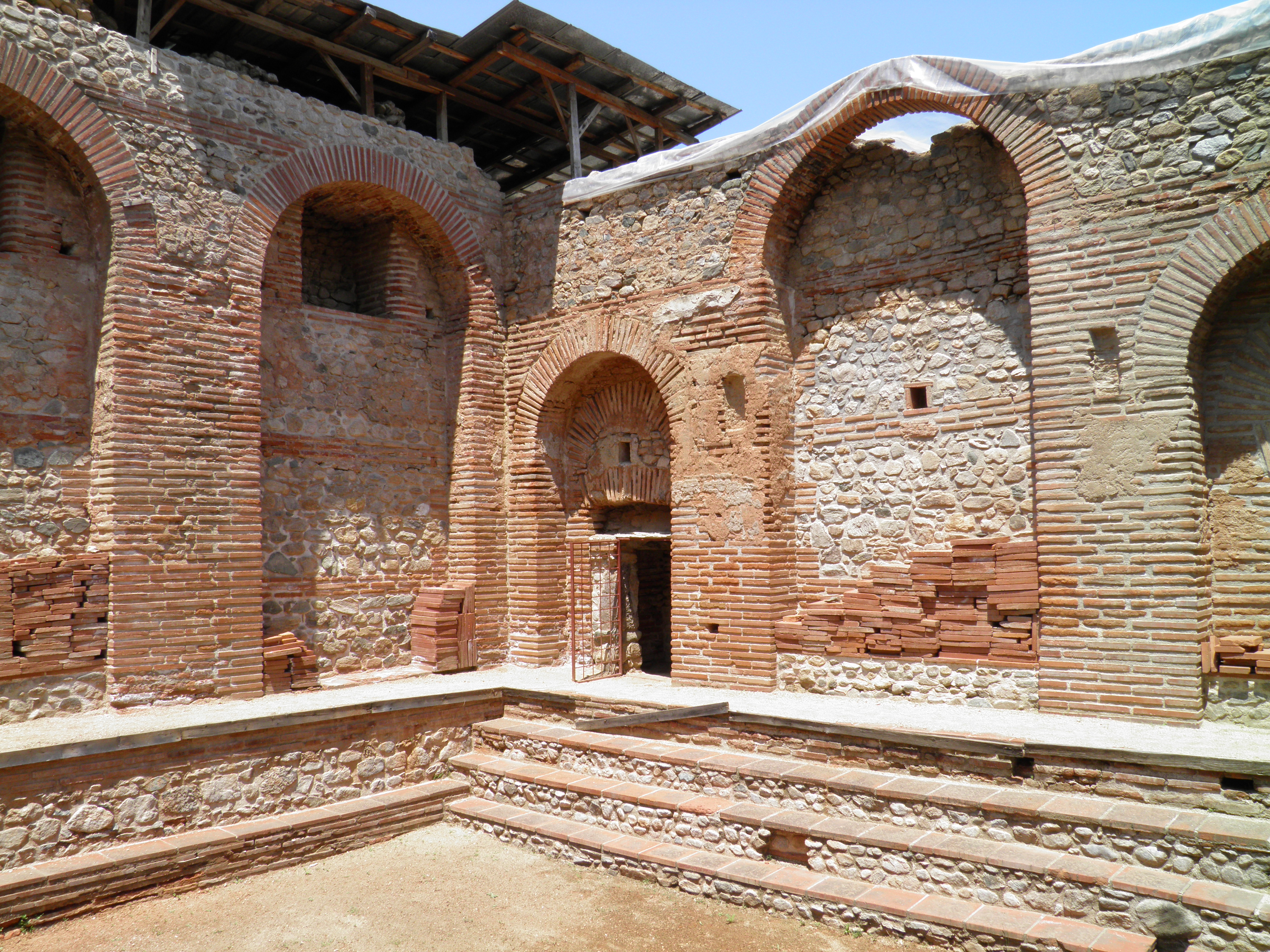
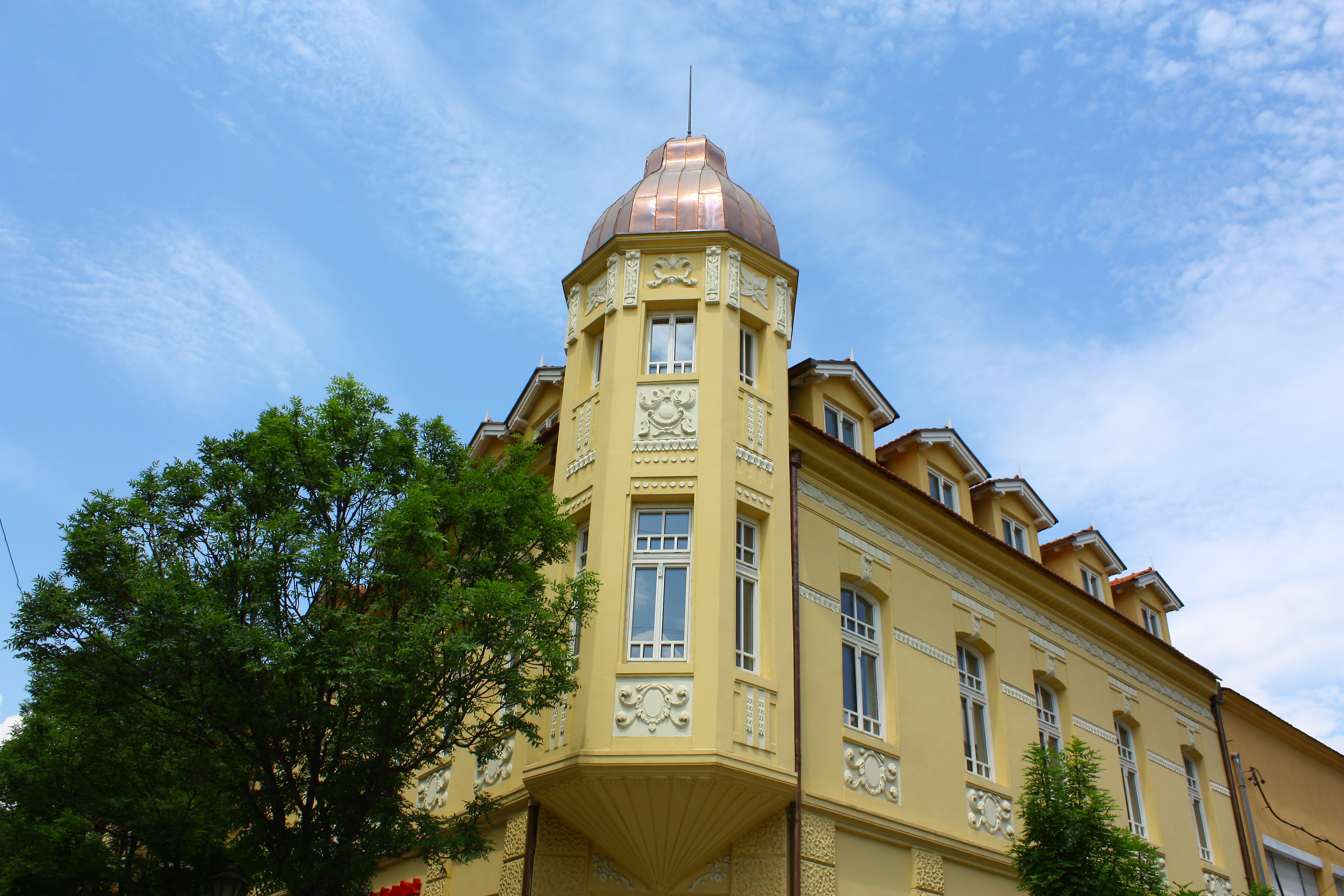
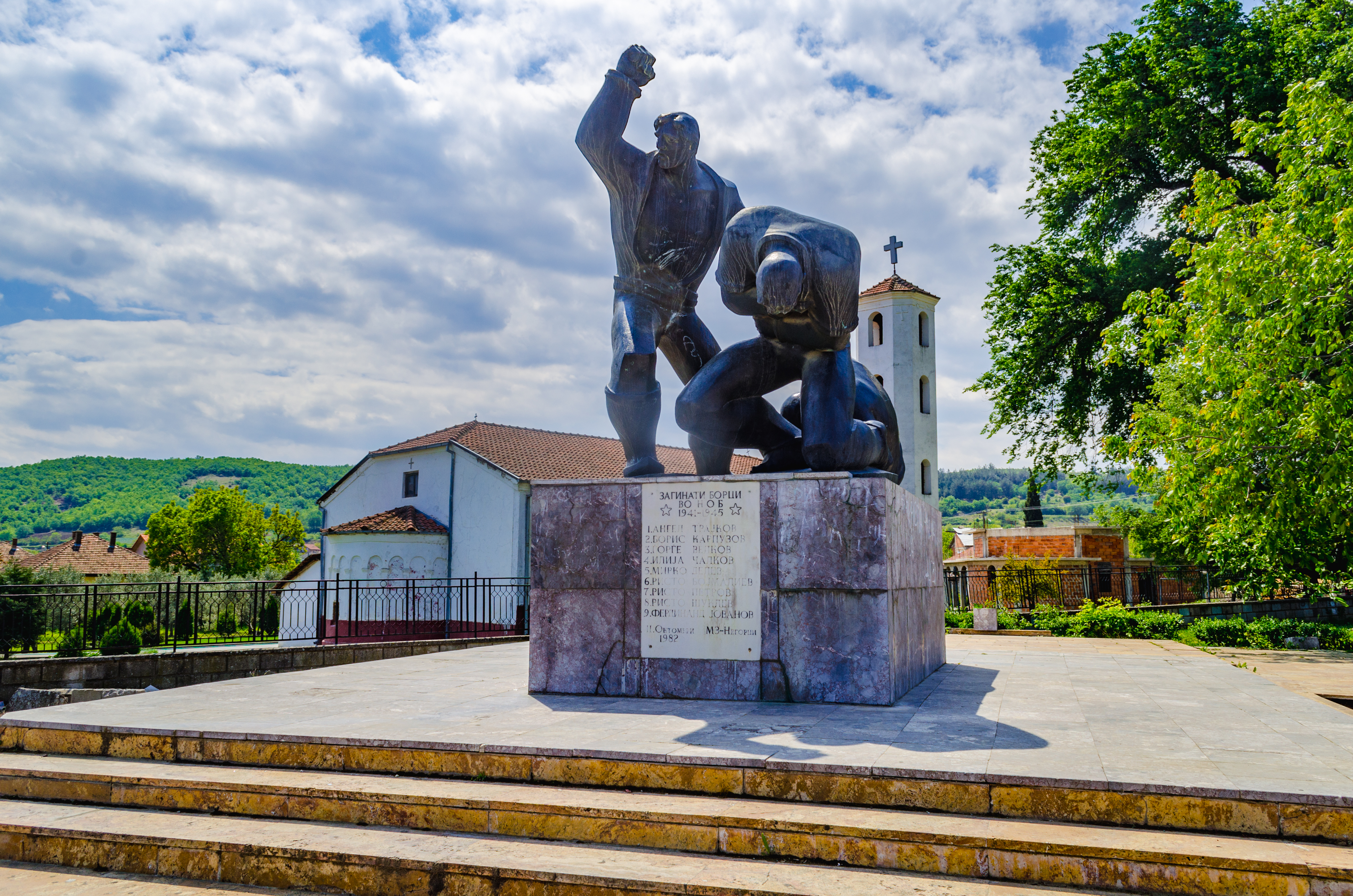
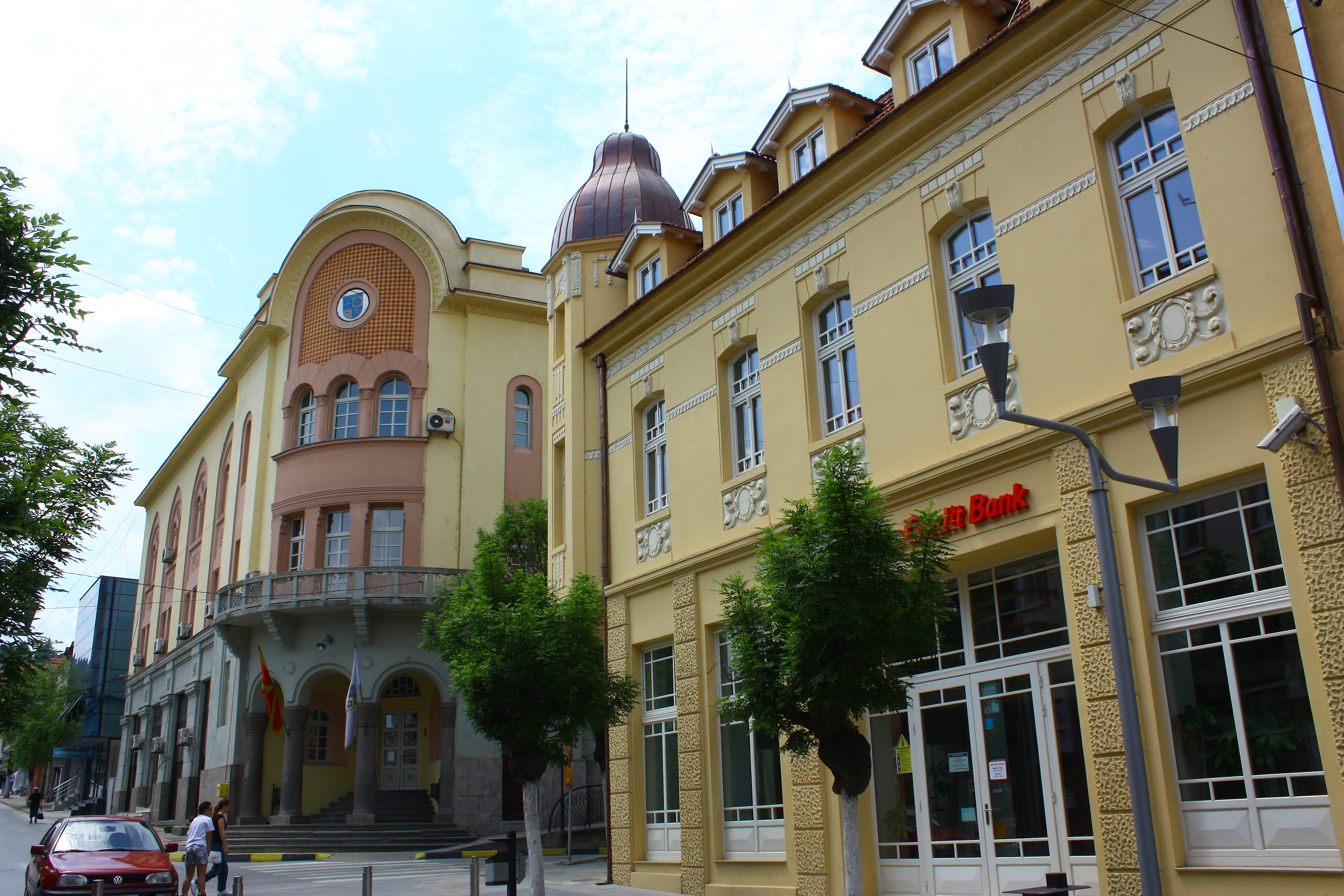
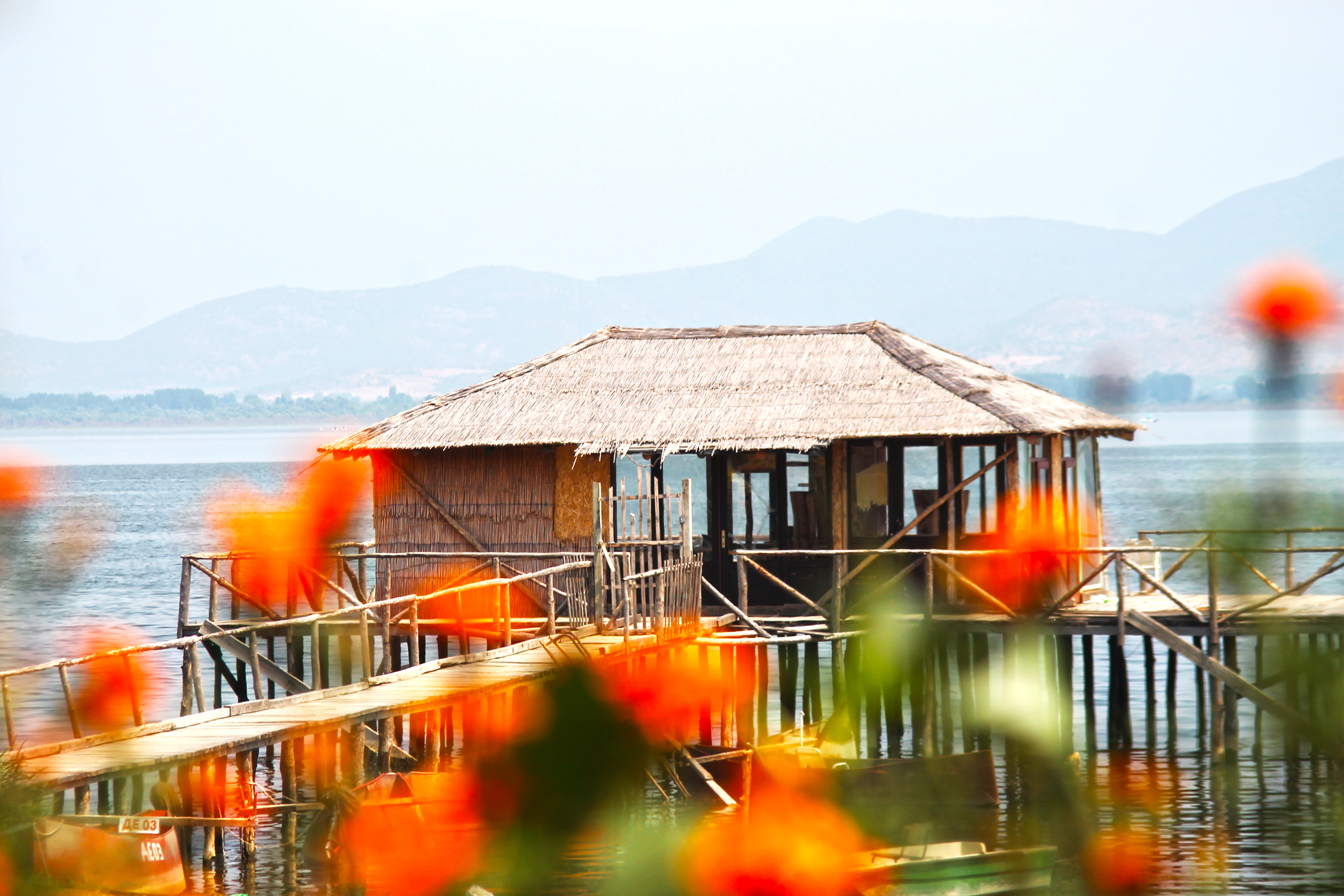
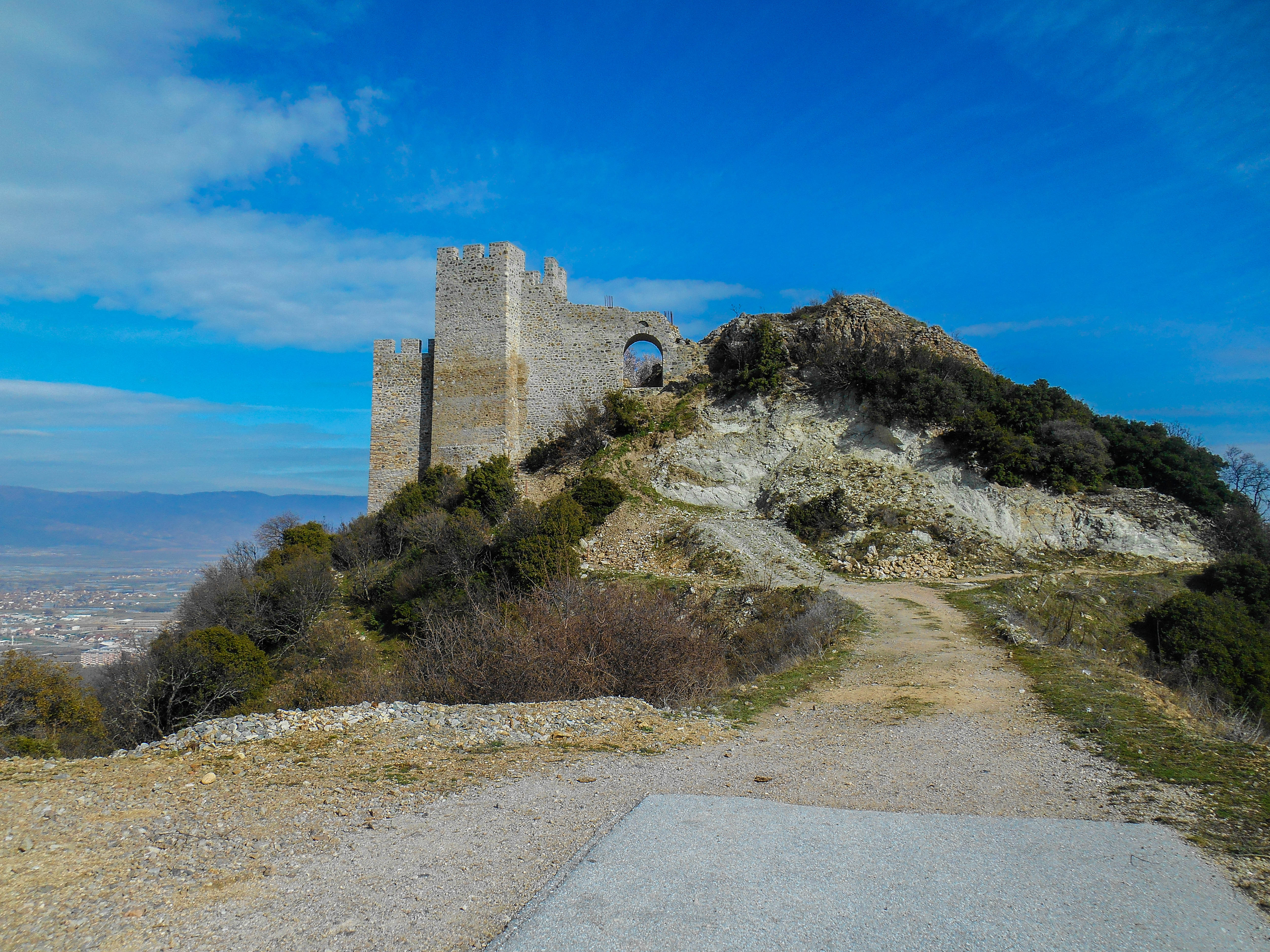
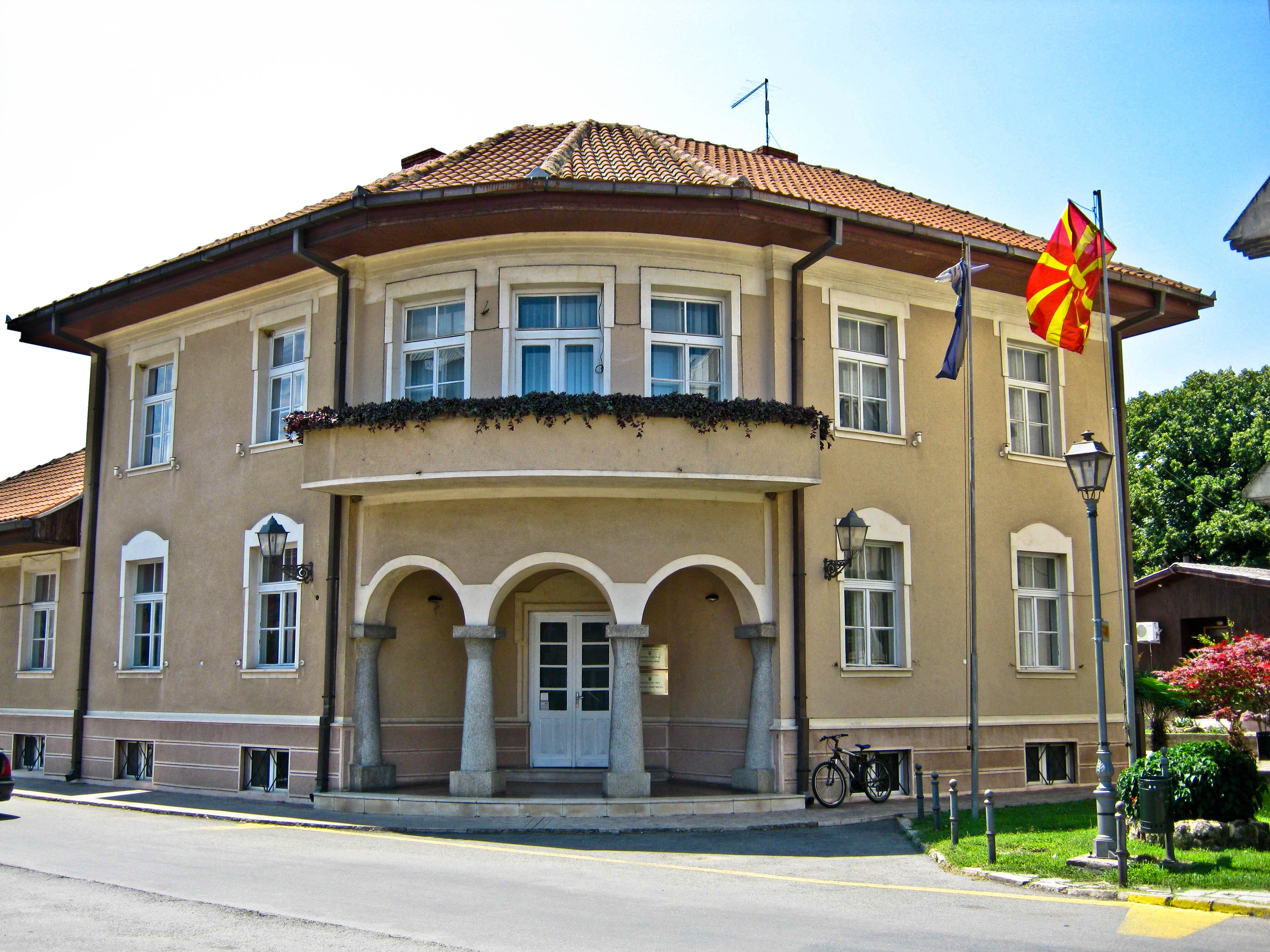
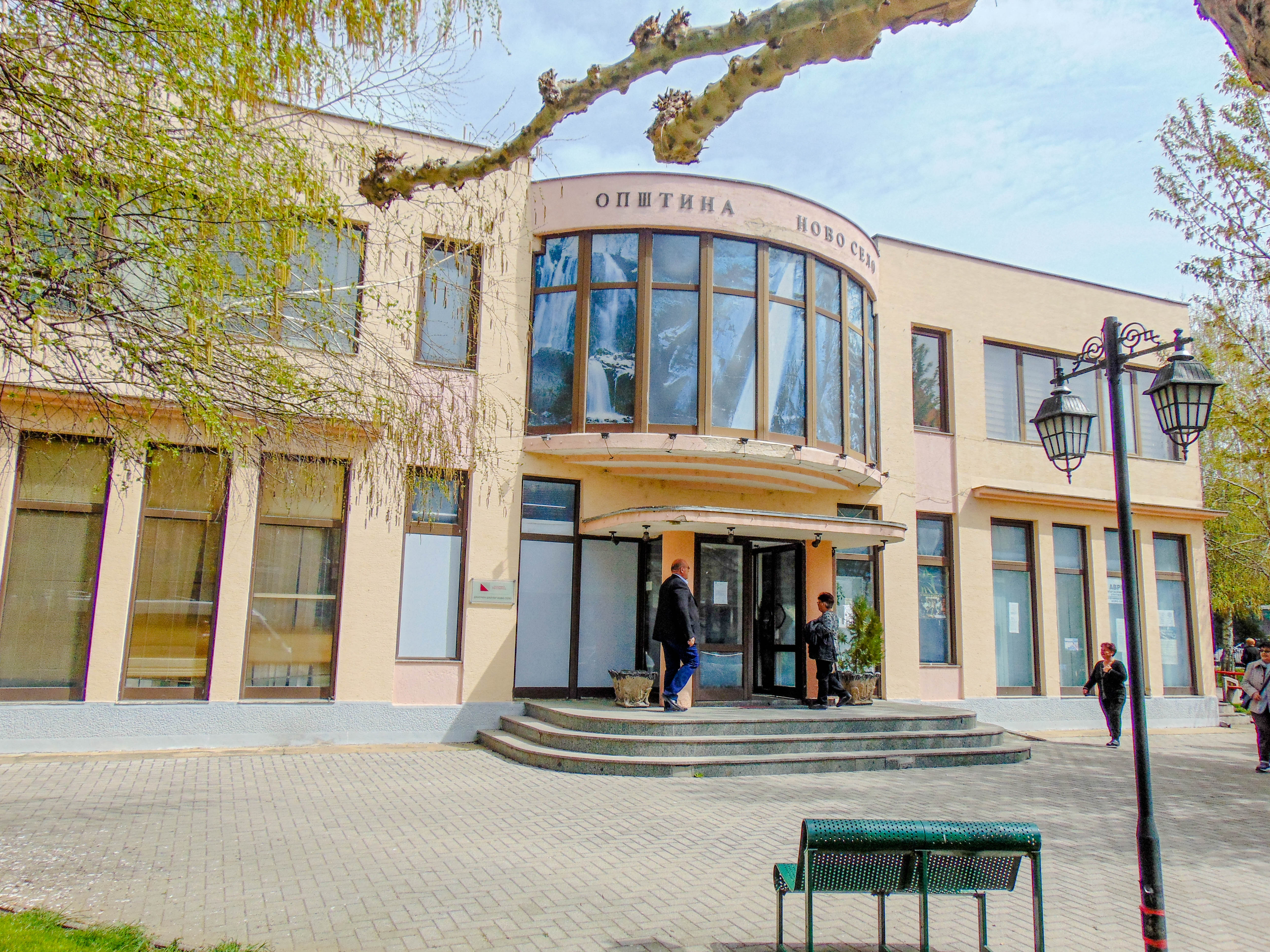
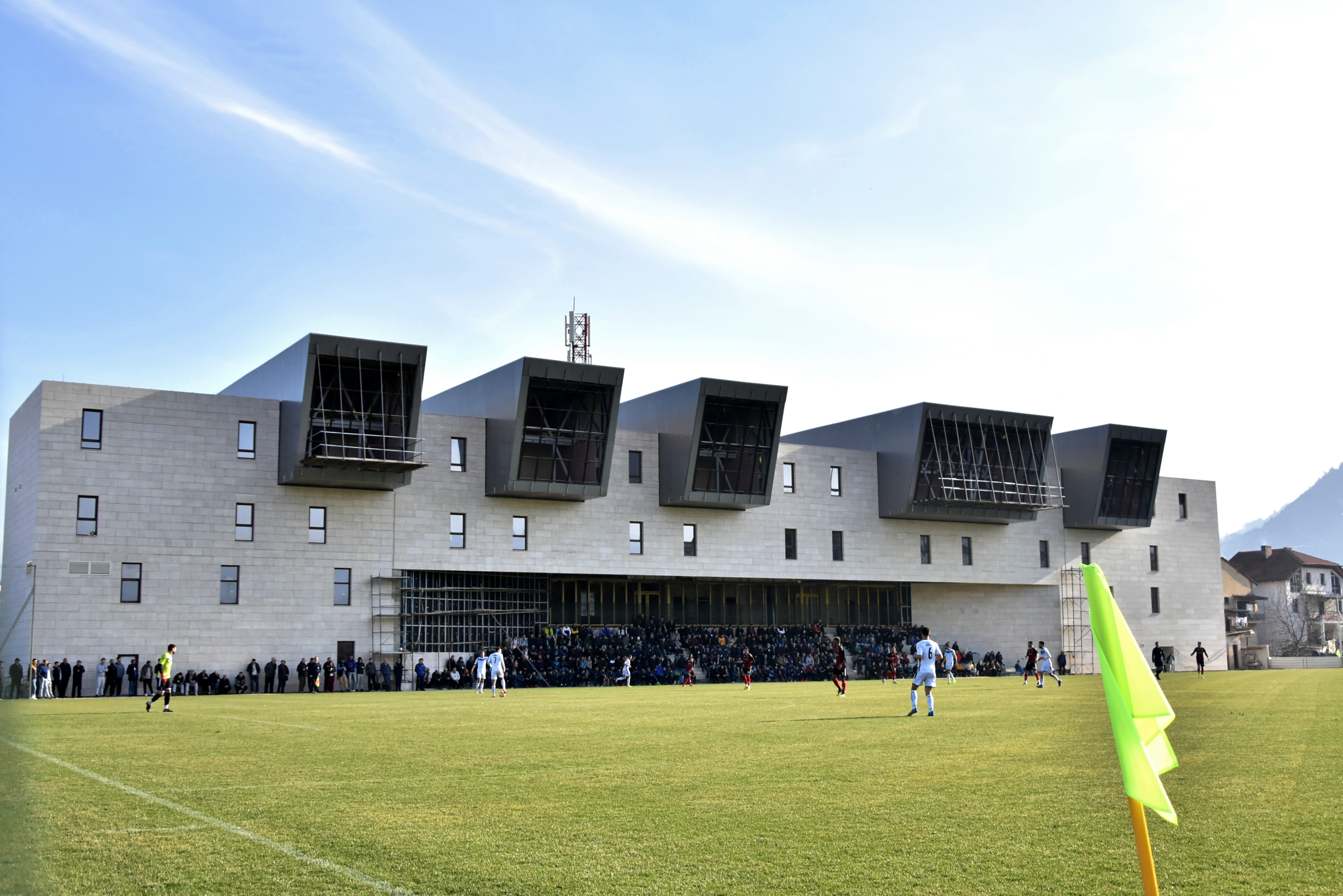
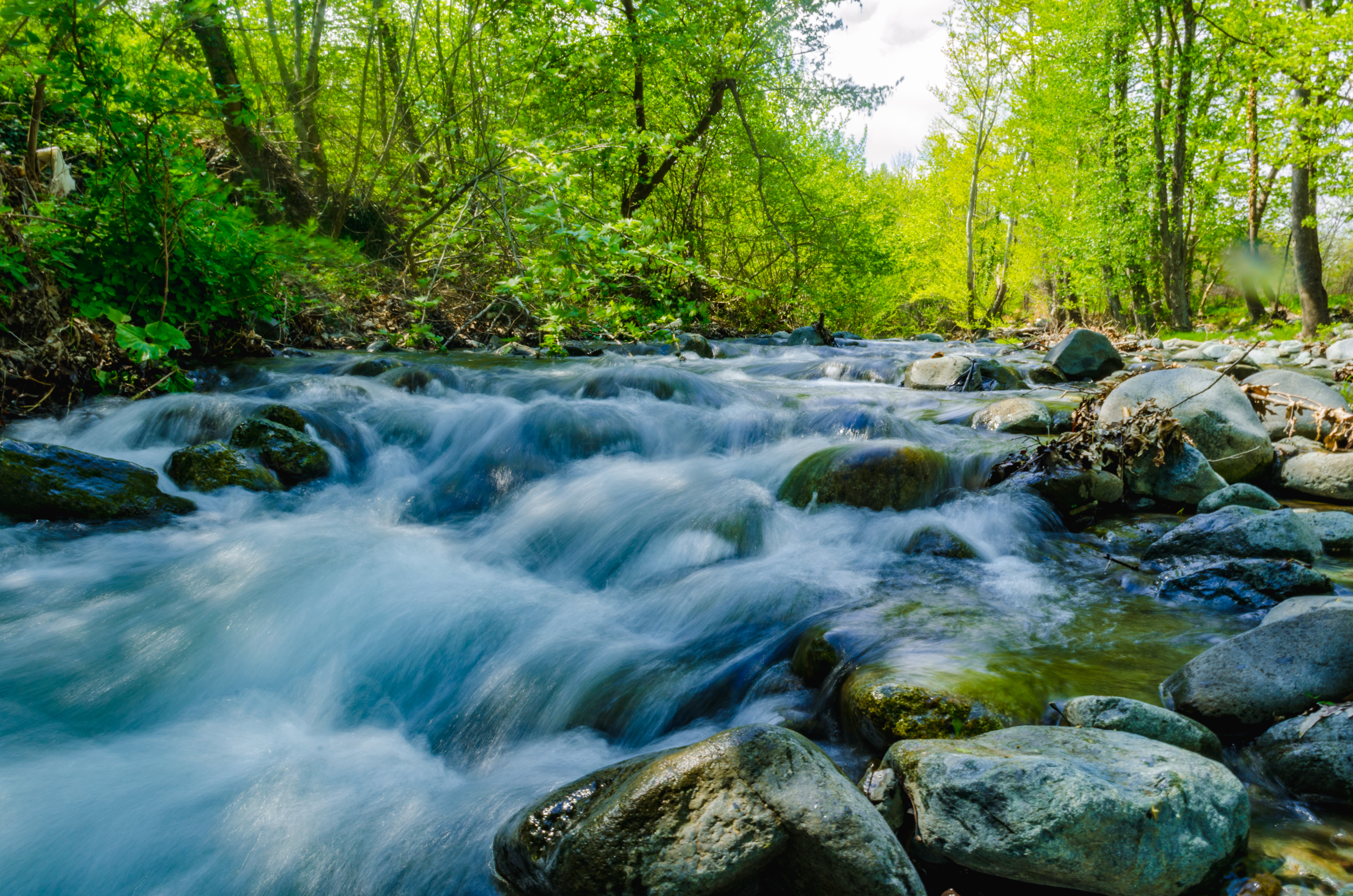
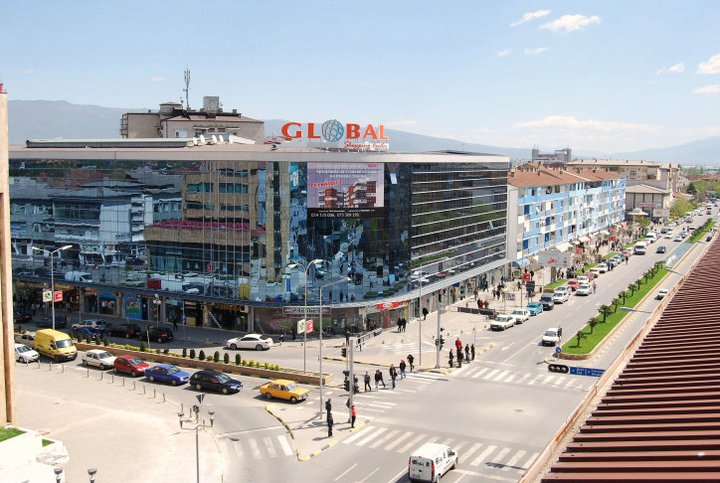

- Seal

- Country: North Macedonia

Area
  - Total: 2,741 km^{2} (1,058 sq mi)

Population (2021)
  - Total: 148,387
  - Density: 54.14/km^{2} (140.2/sq mi)
- HDI (2017): 0.736 high · 8th of 8
- Website: southeast.mk

The Southeastern Statistical Region (Macedonian: Југоисточен Регион, romanized: Jugoistočen Region) is one of eight statistical regions of North Macedonia. Southeastern, located in the southeastern part of the country, borders Greece and Bulgaria. Internally, it borders the Vardar and Eastern statistical regions.

As of 2022, the region has the lowest Human Development Index score out of all subnational regions in Europe.

== Municipalities ==
The municipalities of the region

The Southeastern statistical region is divided into 10 municipalities:

- Bogdanci
- Bosilovo
- Dojran
- Gevgelija
- Konče
- Novo Selo
- Radoviš
- Strumica
- Valandovo
- Vasilevo

== Demographics ==
Map of the largest ethnic groups in the region

=== Population ===
The current population of the Southeastern Statistical Region is 171,416 citizens, according to the last population census in 2002.

Census Year	Population	Change
1994	167,941	N/A
2002	171,416	+3.13%
2021	148,387	−13.4%

=== Ethnicities ===
The largest ethnic group in the region are the Macedonians.

	2002		2021	
	Number	%	Number	%
Total	171,416	100	148,387	100
Macedonians	154,957	90.4	118,284	79.71
Turks	12,746	7.44	13,194	8.89
Serbs	2,104	1.23	1,254	0.85
Roma	555	0.32	609	0.41
Vlachs	253	0.15	297	0.2
Albanians	38	0.02	110	0.07
Bosniaks	18	0.01	20	0.02
Others / Undeclared / Unknown	745	0.43	787	0.53
Persons for whom data are taken from administrative sources			13,832	9.32
