= SM UC-1 =

German Type UC I minelayer submarine or U-boat

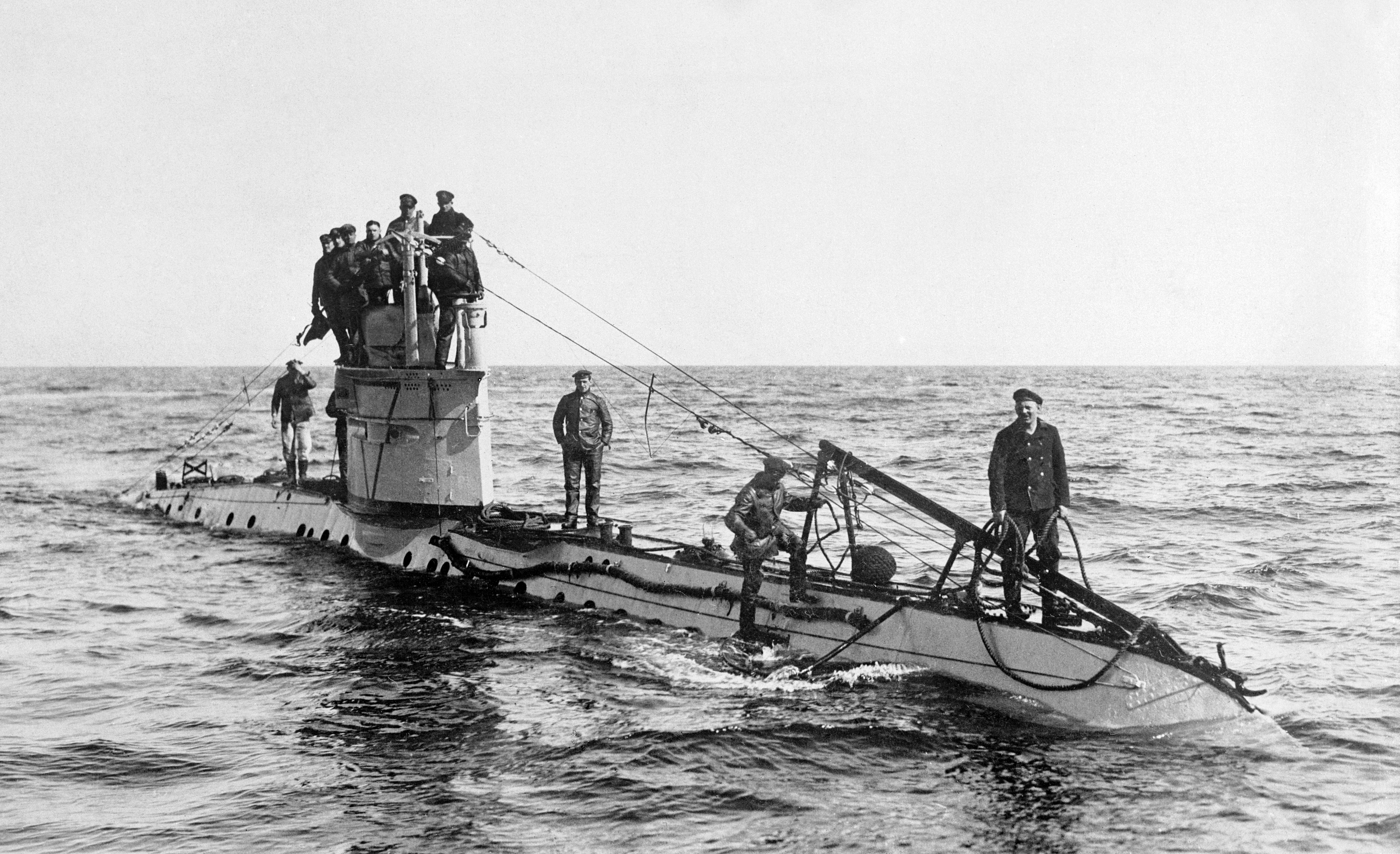

History

German Empire
- Name: UC-1
- Ordered: November 1914
- Builder: AG Vulcan, Hamburg
- Yard number: 45
- Launched: 26 April 1915
- Commissioned: 5 July 1915
- Fate: Missing since 18 July 1917; possibly sunk by mines off Nieuwpoort, Belgium

General characteristics
- Class & type: Type UC I submarine
- Displacement: 168 t (165 long tons), surfaced; 183 t (180 long tons), submerged
- Length: 33.99 m (111 ft 6 in) o/a; 29.62 m (97 ft 2 in) pressure hull
- Beam: 3.15 m (10 ft 4 in)
- Draft: 3.04 m (10 ft)
- Propulsion: 1 × propeller shaft; 1 × 6-cylinder, 4-stroke diesel engine, 90 PS (66 kW; 89 bhp); 1 × electric motor, 175 PS (129 kW; 173 shp)
- Speed: 6.20 knots (11.48 km/h; 7.13 mph), surfaced; 5.22 knots (9.67 km/h; 6.01 mph), submerged
- Range: 780 nmi (1,440 km; 900 mi) at 5 knots (9.3 km/h; 5.8 mph) surfaced; 50 nmi (93 km; 58 mi) at 4 knots (7.4 km/h; 4.6 mph) submerged
- Test depth: 50 m (160 ft)
- Complement: 14
- Armament: 6 × 100 cm (39 in) mine tubes; 12 × UC 120 mines; 1 × 8 mm (0.31 in) machine gun

Service record
- Part of: Flandern Flotilla; 25 June 1915 – 19 July 1917
- Commanders: Oblt.z.S. Egon von Werner; 7 May 1915 – 13 April 1916; Oblt.z.S. Kurt Ramien; 14 April – 31 August 1916; Oblt.z.S. Heinrich Küstner; 1 September – 3 November 1916; Oblt.z.S. Hugo Thielmann; 4 November – 16 December 1916; Lt.z.S. Oskar Steckelberg; 17 December 1916 – 7 January 1917; Oblt.z.S. Hugo Thielmann; 8 January 1917 – 17 March 1917; Oblt.z.S. Walter Warzecha; 18 March – 1 June 1917; Oblt.z.S. Christian Mildenstein; 2 June – 19 July 1917
- Operations: 80 patrols
- Victories: 24 merchant ships sunk (53,249 GRT); 5 warships sunk (3,067 tons); 12 auxiliary warships sunk (2,620 GRT); 9 merchant ships damaged (52,899 GRT)

SM UC-1 was a German Type UC I minelayer submarine or U-boat in the German Imperial Navy (German: Kaiserliche Marine) during World War I. The U-boat had been ordered by November 1914 and was launched on 26 April 1915. She was commissioned into the German Imperial Navy on 5 July 1915 as SM UC-1. (Note: "SM" stands for "Seiner Majestät" (English: His Majesty's) and combined with the U for Unterseeboot would be translated as His Majesty's Submarine.) Mines laid by UC-1 in her 80 patrols were credited with sinking 41 ships. UC-1 disappeared after 18 July 1917.

== Design ==
A Type UC I submarine, UC-1 had a displacement of 168 tonnes (165 long tons) when at the surface and 183 tonnes (180 long tons) while submerged. She had a length overall of 33.99 m (111 ft 6 in), a beam of 3.15 m (10 ft 4 in), and a draught of 3.04 m (10 ft). The submarine was powered by one Daimler-Motoren-Gesellschaft six-cylinder, four-stroke diesel engine producing 90 metric horsepower (66 kW; 89 shp), an electric motor producing 175 metric horsepower (129 kW; 173 shp), and one propeller shaft. She was capable of operating at a depth of 50 metres (160 ft).

The submarine had a maximum surface speed of 6.20 knots (11.48 km/h; 7.13 mph) and a maximum submerged speed of 5.22 knots (9.67 km/h; 6.01 mph). When submerged, she could operate for 50 nautical miles (93 km; 58 mi) at 4 knots (7.4 km/h; 4.6 mph); when surfaced, she could travel 780 nautical miles (1,440 km; 900 mi) at 5 knots (9.3 km/h; 5.8 mph). UC-1 was fitted with six 100 centimetres (39 in) mine tubes, twelve UC 120 mines, and one 8 millimetres (0.31 in) machine gun. She was built by AG Vulcan Stettin and her complement was fourteen crew members.

== Summary of raiding history ==
Date	Name	Nationality	Tonnage (Note: Merchant ship tonnages are in gross register tons. Military vessels are listed by tons displacement.)	Fate
30 June 1915	HMS Lightning	Royal Navy	320	Sunk
14 July 1915	Rym	Norway	1,073	Sunk
15 July 1915	HMT Agamemnon II	Royal Navy	225	Sunk
30 July 1915	Prince Albert	Belgium	1,820	Sunk
31 July 1915	Galicia	United Kingdom	5,922	Damaged
8 August 1915	HMT Ben Ardna	Royal Navy	197	Sunk
14 August 1915	Highland Corrie	United Kingdom	7,583	Damaged
9 September 1915	Balakani	United Kingdom	3,696	Sunk
22 October 1915	HMT Scott	Royal Navy	288	Sunk
9 November 1915	Irene	United Kingdom	543	Sunk
27 November 1915	Klar	United Kingdom	518	Sunk
3 December 1915	HMT Etoile Polaire	Royal Navy	278	Sunk
16 December 1915	Levenpool	United Kingdom	4,844	Damaged
24 December 1915	HMT Carilon	Royal Navy	226	Sunk
24 December 1915	Embla	United Kingdom	1,172	Sunk
2 January 1916	Glocliffe	United Kingdom	2,211	Damaged
18 January 1916	Rijndam	Netherlands	12,527	Damaged
19 January 1916	Leoville	France	775	Sunk
28 January 1916	Perth	Norway	3,522	Damaged
30 January 1916	Maasdijk	Netherlands	3,557	Sunk
11 February 1916	Alabama	Norway	891	Sunk
25 March 1916	Duiveland	Netherlands	1,297	Sunk
27 March 1916	Empress of Midland	United Kingdom	2,224	Sunk
4 April 1916	Bendew	United Kingdom	3,681	Sunk
12 April 1916	Colombia	Netherlands	5,644	Damaged
20 April 1916	Lodewijk Van Nassau	Netherlands	3,350	Sunk
2 May 1916	Fridland	Sweden	4,960	Damaged
26 May 1916	El Argentino	United Kingdom	6,809	Sunk
18 June 1916	Mendibil-mendi	Spain	4,501	Sunk
26 June 1916	Astrologer	United Kingdom	912	Sunk
26 June 1916	HMT Tugela	Royal Navy	233	Sunk
28 June 1916	Mercurius	United Kingdom	129	Sunk
30 June 1916	HMT Whooper	Royal Navy	302	Sunk
16 July 1916	Alto	United Kingdom	2,266	Sunk
16 July 1916	Mopsa	United Kingdom	885	Sunk
30 July 1916	Claudia	United Kingdom	1,144	Sunk
11 August 1916	F. Stobart	United Kingdom	801	Sunk
23 August 1916	HMT Birch	Royal Navy	215	Sunk
27 August 1916	HMD Ocean Plough	Royal Navy	99	Sunk
31 August 1916	HMD Tuberose	Royal Navy	67	Sunk
1 September 1916	Dronning Maud	Norway	1,102	Sunk
4 September 1916	HMT Jessie Nutten	Royal Navy	187	Sunk
6 October 1916	Lanterna	United Kingdom	1,685	Sunk
8 November 1916	HMS Zulu	Royal Navy	1,027	Sunk
28 December 1916	Torpilleur 317	French Navy	100	Sunk
1 January 1917	Sussex	United Kingdom	5,686	Damaged
15 January 1917	Port Nicholson	United Kingdom	8,418	Sunk
11 May 1917	HMT Bracklyn	Royal Navy	303	Sunk
24 June 1917	HMS Kempton	Royal Navy	810	Sunk
24 June 1917	HMS Redcar	Royal Navy	810	Sunk
