= Wacousta (disambiguation) =

Wacousta is an 1832 novel by John Richardson.

Wacousta may also refer to:

- Wacousta, Michigan, United States, an unincorporated community and census-designated place
- Wacousta Hill, a mountain ridge in Hampshire County, West Virginia, United States
- Wacousta Township, Humboldt County, Iowa, United States
- SS Wacousta, a Norwegian cargo ship, built in 1908 and sunk on 8 November 1915
