= List of shipwrecks in February 1916 =

The list of shipwrecks in February 1916 includes ships sunk, foundered, grounded, or otherwise lost during February 1916.

== 1 February ==
List of shipwrecks: 1 February 1916
Ship	State	Description
Belle of France	United Kingdom	World War I: The cargo ship was torpedoed and sunk in the Mediterranean Sea 126 nautical miles (233 km) northwest by west of Alexandria, Egypt (32°30′N 27°45′E) by SM U-21 (Imperial German Navy) with the loss of nineteen crew.
Empress Queen	United Kingdom	The paddle steamer was wrecked on the Ring Rocks in the English Channel off Bembridge, Isle of Wight, England, at 50°40′00″N 001°05′00″W without loss of life.
Franz Fischer	United Kingdom	World War I: The coaster was torpedoed and sunk in the North Sea 2 nautical miles (3.7 km) south of the Kentish Knock Lightship (United Kingdom) by SM UB-17 (Imperial German Navy) with the loss of thirteen crew. Survivors were rescued by Paul (United Kingdom).
Prinses Juliana	Netherlands	World War I: The passenger ship struck a mine in the North Sea off the Sunk Lightship (United Kingdom). She was beached at Felixstowe, Suffolk but was declared a total loss.
Takata Maru	Japan	The passenger ship collided with Silver Shell (United States) in the Atlantic Ocean 200 nautical miles (370 km) south east of Cape Race, Newfoundland and sank. Her 72 crew were rescued by Silver Shell.
Zeearend	Netherlands	World War I: The coaster was scuttled in the North Sea 19 nautical miles (35 km) west north west of the Maas Lightship (Netherlands) by SM UB-17 (Imperial German Navy).

== 2 February ==
List of shipwrecks: 2 February 1916
Ship	State	Description
Daijin Maru	Japan	The passenger ship collided with Li-Nan (China) in the East China Sea 80 nautical miles (150 km) off Swatow, China and sank with the loss of 160 of the 181 people on board.
Jean Bart II	French Navy	World War I: The patrol vessel was torpedoed and sunk in the Adriatic Sea off Durrës, Albania (41°08′N 19°20′E) by SM U-4 (Austro-Hungarian Navy) with the loss of eighteen of her crew.
Sam Brown	United States	The tow steamer was destroyed when her boilers exploded at Huntington, West Virginia. Her captain and 9 or 10 crewmen were killed.

== 4 February ==
List of shipwrecks: 4 February 1916
Ship	State	Description
Barge No. 12	United States	The barge was sunk in a collision with tow steamer Howard (United States) off Point Judith. Three crewmen killed.
HMT De la Pole	Royal Navy	The naval trawler was wrecked on the Goodwin Sands, Kent with the loss of one of her twelve crew. Survivors were rescued by the Deal Lifeboat.
John Garrett	United States	The tugboat sank at the railroad bridge at Old Saybrook, Connecticut.
Minnie D. Kennelly	United States	The barge sank near New Haven, Connecticut after breaking free from her tow Dauntless (United States).

== 5 February ==
List of shipwrecks: 5 February 1916
Ship	State	Description
Geraldine	United Kingdom	The barque foundered in the English Channel east of Herm, Channel Islands.
Marie	France	The three-masted sailing ship was wrecked off the Jardin Lighthouse, Saint-Malo. Ille-et-Vilaine. Her crew were rescued.

== 6 February ==
List of shipwrecks: 6 February 1916
Ship	State	Description
Balgownie	United Kingdom	World War I: The cargo ship struck a mine and sank in the North Sea with the loss of a crew member.
Flamenco	United Kingdom	World War I: The cargo ship was scuttled in the Atlantic Ocean 310 nautical miles (570 km) north east by north of Pernambuco, Brazil by SMS Möwe (Imperial German Navy) with the loss of a crew member.

== 7 February ==
List of shipwrecks: 7 February 1916
Ship	State	Description
Vigilant	Denmark	The schooner was abandoned in the Atlantic Ocean 80 nautical miles (150 km) off the Butt of Lewis, Outer Hebrides, United Kingdom. Her crew were rescued. She was later towed into Stornoway.

== 8 February ==
List of shipwrecks: 8 February 1916
Ship	State	Description
Amiral Charner	French Navy	World War I: The Amiral Charner-class armored cruiser was torpedoed and sunk in the Mediterranean Sea off Beirut, Lebanon by SM U-21 (Imperial German Navy) with the loss of 426 of her 427 crew.
Argo	United Kingdom	World War I: The cargo ship struck a mine and sank in the English Channel 4.5 nautical miles (8.3 km) north west of Boulogne, Pas-de-Calais, France (50°43′N 1°25′E) with the loss of a crew member.
Bohemian	United States	The yacht sank at Essex, Connecticut.
Westburn	United Kingdom	World War I: The cargo ship was scuttled in the Atlantic Ocean 530 nautical miles (980 km) north north east of Pernambuco, Brazil by SMS Möwe (Imperial German Navy). Two of her crew were taken as prisoners of war.

== 9 February ==
List of shipwrecks: 9 February 1916
Ship	State	Description
SMS Hedwig von Wissmann	Imperial German Navy	World War I: Battle for Lake Tanganyika: The guard boat was shelled and sunk in Lake Tanganyika by HMS Fifi and HMS Mimi (both Royal Navy) with the loss of seven of her crew. Survivors were rescued by HMS Fifi.
Horace	United Kingdom	World War I: The cargo ship was scuttled in the Atlantic Ocean 610 nautical miles (1,130 km) north north east of Pernambuco, Brazil by SMS Möwe (Imperial German Navy).
HMT Persistive	Royal Navy	The naval trawler was lost on this date.
S. O. Co. #62	United States	The barge went ashore on Bartletts Reef near New London, Connecticut.
Springwell	United Kingdom	World War I: The cargo ship was torpedoed and sunk in the Mediterranean Sea 65 nautical miles (120 km) south west by west of Gavdos, Greece (34°10′N 23°00′E) by SM U-38 (Imperial German Navy). Her crew survived.
Vaarli	Norway	The cargo ship struck a mine and sank in the North Sea of the coast of the Netherlands with the loss of three of her sixteen crew. Survivors were rescued by Thor (Sweden).

== 10 February ==
List of shipwrecks: 10 February 1916
Ship	State	Description
HMS Arabis	Royal Navy	World War I: The Arabis-class sloop was torpedoed and sunk in the North Sea off the Dogger Bank with the loss of 56 of her 79 crew.
Correct	Norway	The cargo ship collided with RMS Moldavia (Royal Navy) in the North Sea off North Foreland, Kent, United Kingdom. She was cut in two and sank. Nine of her crew climbed aboard Moldavia.

== 11 February ==
List of shipwrecks: 11 February 1916
Ship	State	Description
Alabama	Norway	World War I: The coaster struck a mine and sank in the North Sea 5 nautical miles (9.3 km) off the Kentish Knock Lightship (United Kingdom) (51°35′N 1°40′E). All seventeen crew were rescued by Balzac (Norway).
HMS Arethusa	Royal Navy	HMS Arethusa World War I: The Arethusa-class cruiser struck a mine and was wrecked in the North Sea off Felixtowe, Suffolk with the loss of ten of her crew.
Belford	United Kingdom	The cargo ship ran aground off Islay, Argyll and sank.
Maternzo	Spain	The cargo ship ran aground at Ambès, Gironde, France. She was refloated on 20 February.

== 12 February ==
List of shipwrecks: 12 February 1916
Ship	State	Description
Aduatiek	Belgium	World War I: The cargo ship struck a mine placed by SM UC-4 (Imperial German Navy) and sank in the North Sea off Aldeburgh, Suffolk, United Kingdom (52°08′46″N 1°44′45″E) with the loss of two of her crew.
Cedarwood	United Kingdom	World War I: The coaster struck a mine placed by SM UC-4 (Imperial German Navy) in the North Sea 2.5 nautical miles (4.6 km) east of Aldeburgh and sank with the loss of six of her eight crew. Survivors were rescued by Boldon (United Kingdom).
Leicester	United Kingdom	World War I: The cargo ship struck a mine placed by SM UC-6 (Imperial German Navy) and sank in the English Channel 2.5 nautical miles (4.6 km) south east of Folkestone, Kent with the loss of seventeen of her crew.

== 13 February ==
List of shipwrecks: 13 February 1916
Ship	State	Description
Tergestea	United Kingdom	World War I: The cargo ship struck a mine and sank in the North Sea 8 nautical miles (15 km) east by south of Aldeburgh, Suffolk (52°10′N 1°50′E). Her crew survived. Built in 1911, Tergestea was originally owned by an Austrian line and registered in Trieste prior to World War I. She was likely captured during the war and placed in service as a British freighter.

== 15 February ==
List of shipwrecks: 15 February 1916
Ship	State	Description
Ashby	United Kingdom	The collier was wrecked 2 nautical miles (3.7 km) off Ouessant, Finistère, France with the loss of two of her 20 crew.
Golden Belle	United Kingdom	The schooner was abandoned in the Atlantic Ocean off the coast of Newfoundland. Her crew were rescued.
Wilston	United Kingdom	World War I: The collier struck a mine and sank in the North Sea 20 nautical miles (37 km) east north east of Wick, Caithness with the loss of eight of her crew.

== 16 February ==
List of shipwrecks: 16 February 1916
Ship	State	Description
Hjordis	Norway	The collier sank at Blakeney, Norfolk, United Kingdom with the loss of ten of her crew. She was on a voyage from Hull, Yorkshire, United Kingdom to Calais, France.
Memphis	France	World War I: The cargo ship struck a mine and was damaged in the Adriatic Sea 4 nautical miles (7.4 km) north west of Cape Laghi, Durrës, Albania. She was towed to Durrës but sank on 19 February. Her crew survived.

== 17 February ==
List of shipwrecks: 17 February 1916
Ship	State	Description
Pavlof	United States	During a voyage in the waters of the Territory of Alaska from King Cove to Excursion Inlet with 26 crewmen and a cargo of 100 tons of coal on board, the 1,300 gross register tons (GRT), 196-foot (59.7 m) cannery steamer struck an uncharted rock during a snowstorm and gale and was wrecked without loss of life at Little Tugadak Island (56°30′N 154°40′W) on the coast of Southcentral Alaska.

== 19 February ==
List of shipwrecks: 19 February 1916
Ship	State	Description
Comet	United States	During a voyage from Ketchikan to Loring, Territory of Alaska, the launch was wrecked in a storm near Pup Island (55°29′N 131°49′W) in Southeast Alaska. The three men aboard reached the beach, where two died of hypothermia. The third was rescued.
J. Carlton Hudson	United States	The barge was sunk in a gale and snowstorm while being towed by the tow steamer Richard F. Young (United States) off New York. Three crewmen killed.
John D. Archbold	United States	The cargo ship collided with the steamer Hova (Italy) at New York City and was beached.
Telmo	Spain	The cargo ship collided with the steam tug Sea Cock (United Kingdom) at Liverpool, Lancashire, United Kingdom, and was beached.
Theodor	United Kingdom	The auxiliary schooner foundered in the North Sea off Katwijk, South Holland, Netherlands. Her crew were saved by a Dutch lugger.

== 20 February ==
List of shipwrecks: 20 February 1916
Ship	State	Description
Dingle	United Kingdom	World War I: The coaster struck a mine placed by SM UC-5 (Imperial German Navy) and sank in the North Sea 10 nautical miles (19 km) south by west of the Kentish Knock Lightship (United Kingdom) with the loss of nine of her crew.
HMT Gravenwood	Royal Navy	World War I: The naval trawler struck a mine placed by SM UC-14 (Imperial German Navy) and sank in the Adriatic Sea off Brindisi, Italy with the loss of eleven of her crew.

== 21 February ==
List of shipwrecks: 21 February 1916
Ship	State	Description
HMT Carlton	Royal Navy	World War I: The naval trawler struck a mine placed by UC 6 (Imperial German Navy) and sank in the English Channel off Folkestone, Kent (51°03′N 1°15′E) with the loss of nine of her crew.
La Flandre	Netherlands	World War I: The tanker struck a mine in the North Sea off the Galloper Lightship (United Kingdom) (51°43′N 1°57′E) and sank with the loss of 29 of her 31 crew. The survivors were rescued by Ousel (United Kingdom).
La Petite Henriette	Belgium	World War I: The fishing vessel was sunk in the North Sea off Lowestoft, Suffolk, United Kingdom by SM UB-12 (Imperial German Navy).
Marechiaro	Regia Marina	(Red Cross): World War I: The hospital ship struck a mine placed by SM UC-12 (Imperial German Navy) and sank in the Adriatic Sea off Cape Laghi, Durrës, Albania with the loss of at least 33 lives, and possibly over 200 lives.
Oleander	United Kingdom	World War I: The fishing smack was scuttled in the North Sea 28 nautical miles (52 km) off Lowestoft by SM UB-12 (Imperial German Navy). Her crew survived.
W. E. Brown	United Kingdom	World War I: The fishing smack was scuttled in the North Sea south east of Lowestoft by SM UB-12 (Imperial German Navy). Her crew survived.

== 22 February ==
List of shipwrecks: 22 February 1916
Ship	State	Description
Duckbridge	United Kingdom	World War I: The collier struck a mine and sank in the Atlantic Ocean 6 nautical miles (11 km) north of Strathy Point, Sutherland with the loss of nineteen of her crew.

== 23 February ==
List of shipwrecks: 23 February 1916
Ship	State	Description
Carmanta	United Kingdom	The brigantine was driven ashore at Aldeburgh, Suffolk and wrecked. Her six crew were rescued by rocket apparatus.
Diadem	United Kingdom	World War I: The cargo ship was shelled and sunk in the Mediterranean Sea 56 nautical miles (104 km) south west of Porquerolles, Var, France (42°10′N 6°24′E) by SM U-38 (Imperial German Navy). Her crew survived.
Juniata	United States	The steamer went ashore on Middle Ground Shoal near Martha's Vineyard, Massachusetts.
Monsone	Regia Marina	World War I: The naval trawler struck a mine placed by SM UC-12 (Imperial German Navy) and sank in the Adriatic Sea of Durrës, Albania with the loss of eight of her crew.
Roubine	France	World War I: The brigantine was sunk in the Mediterranean Sea 30 nautical miles (56 km) south by east of Porquerolles (42°11′N 6°20′E) by SM U-38 (Imperial German Navy) with the loss of two crew.
Wilfred Marcus	United Kingdom	The schooner sank at Saint John, New Brunswick.

== 24 February ==
List of shipwrecks: 24 February 1916
Ship	State	Description
Charlotte	Norway	The barque ran aground at the mouth of the River Tees, Northumberland, United Kingdom and was wrecked. Her crew were rescued.
Daquoise	France	The cargo ship foundered in the English Channel off the coast of Cornwall, United Kingdom. Her crew were rescued.
Denaby	United Kingdom	World War I: The cargo ship was shelled and sunk in the Mediterranean Sea 40 nautical miles (74 km) south south west of the Île du Planier, Bouches-du-Rhône, France (42°32′N 5°40′E) by SM U-38 (Imperial German Navy) with the loss of a crew member.
Fastnet	United Kingdom	World War I: The cargo ship was shelled and sunk in the Mediterranean Sea 55 nautical miles (102 km) south west of the Île du Planier (42°28′N 4°44′E) by SM U-38 (Imperial German Navy). Her crew survived.
Southford	United Kingdom	World War I: The cargo ship struck a mine and sank in the North Sea off Great Yarmouth, Norfolk with the loss of two of her thirteen crew. Survivors were rescued by Paul (United Kingdom) and a Royal Navy patrol boat.
Torborg	Sweden	World War I: The cargo ship was shelled and sunk in the Mediterranean Sea 40 nautical miles (74 km) of Marseille, Bouches-su-Rhône (42°28′N 4°44′E) by SM U-38 (Imperial German Navy). Her crew survived.
Trignac	France	World War I: The cargo ship struck a mine placed by SM UC-6 (Imperial German Navy) and sank in the North Sea 7 nautical miles (13 km) west of the Outer Dowsing Lightship (United Kingdom) with the loss of 26 of the 30 people on board. Survivors were rescued by Borgsten (Norway).
Tummel	United Kingdom	World War I: The coaster struck a mine placed by SM UC-5 (Imperial German Navy) and sank in the North Sea 7 nautical miles (13 km) south of the Kentish Knock Lightship (United Kingdom) with the loss of nine of her fourteen crew.

== 25 February ==
List of shipwrecks: 25 February 1916
Ship	State	Description
Mary C. Santos	United States	The fishing schooner burned after a gasoline explosion and sank in a few feet of water near the Boston Fish Pier at South Boston, Massachusetts. Probably sunk by fire fighting efforts of the fire boats Engine 44 and Engine 47 (both flag unknown). Two were killed, one missing. Survivors rescued by dories from Valerie (flag unknown), an unknown Italian power boat, and her own boats.
Saxon Prince	United Kingdom	World War I: The cargo ship was scuttled in the Atlantic Ocean 620 nautical miles (1,150 km) west of the Fastnet Rock by SMS Möwe (Imperial German Navy). Her crew were taken as prisoners of war.
Southford	United Kingdom	World War I: The coaster struck a mine placed by SM UC-10 (Imperial German Navy) and sank in the North Sea 4 nautical miles (7.4 km) east south east of Southwold, Suffolk (52°17′N 1°47′E) with the loss of four of her crew.

== 26 February ==
List of shipwrecks: 26 February 1916
Ship	State	Description
Arbonne	United Kingdom	World War I: The coaster was torpedoed and sunk in the Thames Estuary 3 nautical miles (5.6 km) off the Kentish Knock Lightship (United Kingdom) by SM UB-2 (Imperial German Navy) with the loss of all fourteen crew.
Au Revoir	French Navy	World War I: The auxiliary minesweeper was sunk in the English Channel off Le Havre, Seine-Inférieure (49°33′N 0°04′E) by SM UB-18 (Imperial German Navy). Her crew survived.
Bogatyr	Denmark	The cargo ship was driven ashore at Chapel Point, Lincolnshire, United Kingdom with the loss of nine of her 23 crew.
Birgit	Sweden	World War I: The cargo ship struck a mine placed by SM UC-10 (Imperial German Navy) and sank in the Thames Estuary 4 nautical miles (7.4 km) off the Kentish Knock Lightship (United Kingdom) (51°39′N 1°39′E) with the loss of a crew member.
Dido	United Kingdom	World War I: The cargo ship struck a mine and sank in the North Sea with the loss of all 26 crew.
HMT Lily Reaich	Royal Navy	World War I: The naval trawler struck a mine placed by SM UC-12 (Imperial German Navy) and sank in the Adriatic Sea off Durrës, Albania with the loss of ten of her crew.
Provence II	French Navy	World War I: The armed merchant cruiser was sunk in the Mediterranean Sea off Cerigo, Greece by SM U-35 (Imperial German Navy) with the loss of 990 of the 1,732 people on board.
Suevier	United Kingdom	The cargo ship caught fire in the Atlantic Ocean and was abandoned by her crew.

== 27 February ==
List of shipwrecks: 27 February 1916
Ship	State	Description
Empress of Fort William	Canada	World War I: The cargo ship struck a mine and sank in the English Channel 2 nautical miles (3.7 km) south of Dover, Kent (51°05′00″N 1°19′30″E). Her crew survived.
Giava	Italy	World War I: The cargo ship was sunk in the Mediterranean Sea south west of Cape Matapan, Greece by SM U-35 (Imperial German Navy). Her crew survived.
Helen G. King	United States	The schooner sank, or ran aground and wrecked, in the Cape Cod Canal near Bourne, Massachusetts. Abandoned by her owners, the Canal company paid for her to be removed by breaking her up.
Holar	Denmark	The cargo ship was driven ashore 2 nautical miles (3.7 km) north of Rattray Head, Aberdeenshire, United Kingdom. Her crew were rescued.
Maloja	United Kingdom	World War I: The ocean liner struck a mine and sank in the English Channel 2 nautical miles (3.7 km) south west of Dover (51°05′N 1°19′E) with the loss of 155 lives.
Margaret Haskell	United States	The schooner was abandoned in the Atlantic Ocean. She was reported to be floating in a capsized condition off Cat Island, Bahamas on 6 May.
Mecklenburg	Netherlands	World War I: The cargo liner struck a mine and sank in the North Sea off the Galloper Lightship (United Kingdom). All on board were rescued by Westerdijk (Netherlands) and two other vessels.
Ruth	Sweden	The schooner was driven ashore at Spittal, Northumberland, United Kingdom and was wrecked. Her crew were rescued.

== 28 February ==
List of shipwrecks: 28 February 1916
Ship	State	Description
Ander	Norway	The barque was driven ashore at Blyth, Northumberland, United Kingdom and was wrecked with the loss of four of her crew.
HMT Angelus	Royal Navy	World War I: The naval trawler struck a mine placed by SM UC-6 (Imperial German Navy) and sank in the English Channel off Dover, Kent (51°03′50″N 1°18′20″E) with the loss of two of her crew.
Masunda	United Kingdom	World War I: The cargo ship was shelled and sunk in the Mediterranean Sea 106 nautical miles (196 km) south west by south of Cape Matapan, Greece (34°54′N 21°20′E) by SM U-35 (Imperial German Navy). Her crew survived.
Thornaby	United Kingdom	World War I: The cargo ship struck a mine placed by SM UC-3 (Imperial German Navy) and sank in the North Sea off the Shipwash Lightship (United Kingdom) (52°03′30″N 1°43′00″E) with the loss of nineteen of her crew.
HMT Weigelia	Royal Navy	World War I: The naval trawler struck a mine placed by SM UC-6 (Imperial German Navy) and sank in the English Channel off Dover (51°08′30″N 1°27′30″E) with the loss of a crew member.
Knippla	Sweden	World War I: The cargo ship, en route from Trelleborg to Gothenburg, struck a mine in a freshly laid minefield near Falsterbo and sank immediately. No casualties.

== 29 February ==
List of shipwrecks: 29 February 1916
Ship	State	Description
HMS Alcantara	Royal Navy	HMS Alcantara and SMS Grief World War I: Action of 29 February 1916: The auxiliary cruiser was shelled and sunk in the North Sea by SMS Greif (Imperial German Navy).
Alexander Wentzel	Russia	World War I: The cargo ship was sunk in the Mediterranean Sea off the Cap de Fer, Algeria (37°21′N 7°34′E) by SM U-38 (Imperial German Navy) with the loss of 18 of her 29 crew.
HMT Chester II	Royal Navy	The naval trawler was lost on this date.
Eliza S.	Italy	World War I: The sailing vessel was sunk in the Mediterranean Sea west of Bizerta, Tunisia (37°24′N 7°42′E) by SM U-38 (Imperial German Navy).
SMS F32	Imperial German Navy	The F Type minesweeping boat was lost on this date.
SMS Greif	Imperial German Navy	World War I: Action of 29 February 1916: The auxiliary cruiser was shelled and sunk in the North Sea by HMS Alcantara, HMS Comus and HMS Munster (all Royal Navy) with the loss of 97 of her 310 crew.
Lakmé	France	The cargo ship sank in the Bay of Biscay south west of the Île d'Yeu, Vendée with the loss of six of her crew.
Mercia	Sweden	The ship ran aground at Pennard, Glamorgan, United Kingdom. She subsequently broke in two. Mercia was on a voyage from Bilbao, Spain to Briton Ferry, Glamorgan.
HMS Primula	Royal Navy	World War I: The Arabis-class sloop was sunk in the Mediterranean Sea off Cerigo, Greece (34°39′N 22°17′E) by SM U-35 (Imperial German Navy) with the loss of four crew.

== Unknown date ==
List of shipwrecks: Unknown date 1916
Ship	State	Description
Emily I. White	United States	The schooner was wrecked near Charleston, South Carolina before 17 February.
Kenkon Maru No.11	Japan	The cargo ship foundered in the Atlantic Ocean before 17 February. Her crew were rescued.
Mabel D. Hines	United States	The schooner was abandoned in the Atlantic Ocean before 21 February. Her crew were rescued.
