= SM UC-6 =

German Imperial Navy submarine

Coordinates: 51°30′42″N 01°34′40″E

History

German Empire
- Name: UC-6
- Ordered: November 1914
- Builder: AG Vulcan, Hamburg
- Yard number: 50
- Launched: 20 June 1915
- Commissioned: 24 June 1915
- Fate: Sunk by mine, 27 September 1917

General characteristics
- Class & type: Type UC I submarine
- Displacement: 168 t (165 long tons), surfaced; 183 t (180 long tons), submerged
- Length: 33.99 m (111 ft 6 in) o/a; 29.62 m (97 ft 2 in) pressure hull
- Beam: 3.15 m (10 ft 4 in)
- Draft: 3.04 m (10 ft)
- Propulsion: 1 × propeller shaft; 1 × 6-cylinder, 4-stroke diesel engine, 90 PS (66 kW; 89 bhp); 1 × electric motor, 175 PS (129 kW; 173 shp)
- Speed: 6.20 knots (11.48 km/h; 7.13 mph), surfaced; 5.22 knots (9.67 km/h; 6.01 mph), submerged
- Range: 780 nmi (1,440 km; 900 mi) at 5 knots (9.3 km/h; 5.8 mph) surfaced; 50 nmi (93 km; 58 mi) at 4 knots (7.4 km/h; 4.6 mph) submerged
- Test depth: 50 m (160 ft)
- Complement: 14
- Armament: 6 × 100 cm (39 in) mine tubes; 12 × UC 120 mines; 1 × 8 mm (0.31 in) machine gun

Service record
- Part of: Flandern Flotilla; 31 July 1915 – 27 September 1917
- Commanders: Oblt.z.S. Matthias Graf von Schmettow; 24 June 1915 – 4 May 1916; Oblt.z.S. Otto Ehrentraut; 5 May – 5 September 1916; Oblt.z.S. Paul Günther; 6 September – 4 November 1916; Oblt.z.S. Werner von Zerboni di Sposetti; 5 November 1916 – 30 April 1917; Oblt.z.S. Werner Löwe; 1 May – 1 September 1917; Oblt.z.S. Gottfried Reichenbach; 2 – 27 September 1917
- Operations: 89 patrols
- Victories: 35 merchant ships sunk (59,125 GRT + Unknown GRT); 1 warship sunk (810 tons); 19 auxiliary warships sunk (4,194 GRT); 7 merchant ships damaged (32,726 GRT); 1 warship damaged (810 tons); 1 auxiliary warship damaged (378 GRT)

SM UC-6 was a German Type UC I minelayer submarine or U-boat in the German Imperial Navy (German: Kaiserliche Marine) during World War I. The U-boat had been ordered by November 1914 and was launched on 20 June 1915. She was commissioned into the German Imperial Navy on 24 June 1915 as SM UC-6. (Note: "SM" stands for "Seiner Majestät" (English: His Majesty's) and combined with the U for Unterseeboot would be translated as His Majesty's Submarine.) Mines laid by UC-6 in her 89 patrols were credited with sinking 55 ships.

== Design ==
A Type UC I submarine, UC-6 had a displacement of 168 tonnes (165 long tons) when at the surface and 183 tonnes (180 long tons) while submerged. She had a length overall of 33.99 m (111 ft 6 in), a beam of 3.15 m (10 ft 4 in), and a draught of 3.04 m (10 ft). The submarine was powered by one Daimler-Motoren-Gesellschaft six-cylinder, four-stroke diesel engine producing 90 metric horsepower (66 kW; 89 shp), an electric motor producing 175 metric horsepower (129 kW; 173 shp), and one propeller shaft. She was capable of operating at a depth of 50 metres (160 ft).

The submarine had a maximum surface speed of 6.20 knots (11.48 km/h; 7.13 mph) and a maximum submerged speed of 5.22 knots (9.67 km/h; 6.01 mph). When submerged, she could operate for 50 nautical miles (93 km; 58 mi) at 4 knots (7.4 km/h; 4.6 mph); when surfaced, she could travel 780 nautical miles (1,440 km; 900 mi) at 5 knots (9.3 km/h; 5.8 mph). UC-6 was fitted with six 100 centimetres (39 in) mine tubes, twelve UC 120 mines, and one 8 millimetres (0.31 in) machine gun. She was built by AG Vulcan Stettin and her complement was fourteen crew members.

== Fate ==
UC-6 sailed from Zeebrugge on 27 September 1917 to lay mines off the Kentish Knock and did not return. She was later reported by British patrols that strong explosions had occurred in explosive nets laid in the area that same day. Other sources, however, state that UC-6 was destroyed by a British seaplane on 28 September 1917.

== Summary of raiding history ==
Date	Name	Nationality	Tonnage (Note: Merchant ship tonnages are in gross register tons. Military vessels are listed by tons displacement.)	Fate
14 August 1915	HMT Worsley	Royal Navy	309	Sunk
16 August 1915	HMT Japan	Royal Navy	205	Sunk
25 August 1915	Disa	Sweden	788	Sunk
28 August 1915	HMT Dane	Royal Navy	265	Sunk
29 August 1915	Sir William Stephenson	United Kingdom	1,540	Sunk
16 September 1915	Africa	United Kingdom	1,038	Sunk
18 September 1915	HMT Lydian	Royal Navy	244	Sunk
18 September 1915	San Zeferino	United Kingdom	6,430	Damaged
20 September 1915	Horden	United Kingdom	1,434	Sunk
23 September 1915	Groningen	United Kingdom	988	Sunk
24 September 1915	HMD Great Heart	Royal Navy	78	Sunk
27 September 1915	Nigretia	United Kingdom	3,187	Damaged
5 October 1915	Alose	French Navy	214	Sunk
18 October 1915	Aleppo	United Kingdom	3,870	Damaged
18 October 1915	Salerno	Norway	2,431	Sunk
21 October 1915	Monitoria	United Kingdom	1,904	Sunk
31 October 1915	HMY Aries	Royal Navy	268	Sunk
31 October 1915	Eidsiva	Norway	1,092	Sunk
31 October 1915	HMT Othello II	Royal Navy	206	Sunk
31 October 1915	Toward	United Kingdom	1,218	Sunk
3 November 1915	Friargate	United Kingdom	264	Sunk
12 November 1915	Moorside	United Kingdom	311	Sunk
12 November 1915	Nigel	United Kingdom	1,400	Sunk
12 January 1916	Traquair	United Kingdom	1,067	Sunk
12 February 1916	Leicester	United Kingdom	1,001	Sunk
21 February 1916	HMT Carlton	Royal Navy	267	Sunk
24 February 1916	Trignac	France	2,375	Sunk
27 February 1916	Empress of Fort William	United Kingdom	2,181	Sunk
27 February 1916	Maloja	United Kingdom	12,431	Sunk
28 February 1916	HMT Angelus	Royal Navy	304	Sunk
28 February 1916	HMT Weigelia	Royal Navy	262	Sunk
4 March 1916	HMT Flicker	Royal Navy	192	Sunk
23 March 1916	HMT Corona	Royal Navy	212	Sunk
23 March 1916	Sea Serpent	United Kingdom	902	Sunk
24 March 1916	Christianssund	Denmark	1,017	Sunk
26 March 1916	Saint Cecilia	United Kingdom	4,411	Sunk
7 April 1916	Halcyon	United Kingdom	1,319	Sunk
14 April 1916	Shenandoah	United Kingdom	3,886	Sunk
21 April 1916	Estafette	French Navy	267	Sunk
29 April 1916	Saint Corentin	French Navy	216	Sunk
16 May 1916	Batavier V	Netherlands	1,569	Sunk
26 May 1916	Volharding	Belgium	1,000	Sunk
1 June 1916	Excellenz Mehnert	Norway	646	Sunk
8 June 1916	HMT Kaphreda	Royal Navy	245	Sunk
19 June 1916	Corton Light Vessel	United Kingdom	unknown	Sunk
19 June 1916	Saint Jacques	France	72	Sunk
21 June 1916	Otis Tarda	Netherlands	759	Sunk
23 June 1916	Burma	United Kingdom	706	Sunk
27 June 1916	Waalstroom	Netherlands	1,441	Sunk
29 June 1916	HMT Hirose	Royal Navy	275	Sunk
7 July 1916	Gannet	United Kingdom	1,127	Sunk
10 July 1916	Kara	United Kingdom	2,338	Sunk
3 September 1916	Mascotte	United Kingdom	1,097	Sunk
2 October 1916	HMD Girl Eva	Royal Navy	76	Sunk
29 December 1916	Lonada	United Kingdom	1,286	Sunk
29 December 1916	HMS Ludlow	Royal Navy	810	Sunk
29 December 1916	HMS Totnes	Royal Navy	810	Damaged
22 February 1917	Ashtabula	United Kingdom	7,025	Damaged
31 March 1917	HMD Forward III	Royal Navy	89	Sunk
19 April 1917	Lumina	United Kingdom	5,856	Damaged
12 May 1917	Waterville	United Kingdom	1,968	Damaged
7 June 1917	HMS Mercury	Royal Navy	378	Damaged
16 June 1917	Roald Amundsen	Norway	4,390	Damaged
18 June 1917	Dorte Jensen	Denmark	2,086	Sunk

== Bibliography ==
- Bendert, Harald (2001). Die UC-Boote der Kaiserlichen Marine 1914-1918. Minenkrieg mit U-Booten (in German). Hamburg, Berlin, Bonn: Mittler. ISBN 3-8132-0758-7.
- Gröner, Erich; Jung, Dieter; Maass, Martin (1991). U-boats and Mine Warfare Vessels. German Warships 1815–1945. Vol. 2. Translated by Thomas, Keith; Magowan, Rachel. London: Conway Maritime Press. ISBN 0-85177-593-4.
- Gardiner, Robert; Gray, Randal, eds. (1985). Conway's All the World's Fighting Ships 1906–1921. Annapolis, Maryland: Naval Institute Press. ISBN 978-0-87021-907-8. OCLC 12119866.
- Tarrant, V. E. (1989). The U-Boat Offensive: 1914–1945. Annapolis, Maryland: Naval Institute Press. ISBN 978-0-87021-764-7. OCLC 20338385.
