= SS Maplewood =

British steamship sunk in World War I

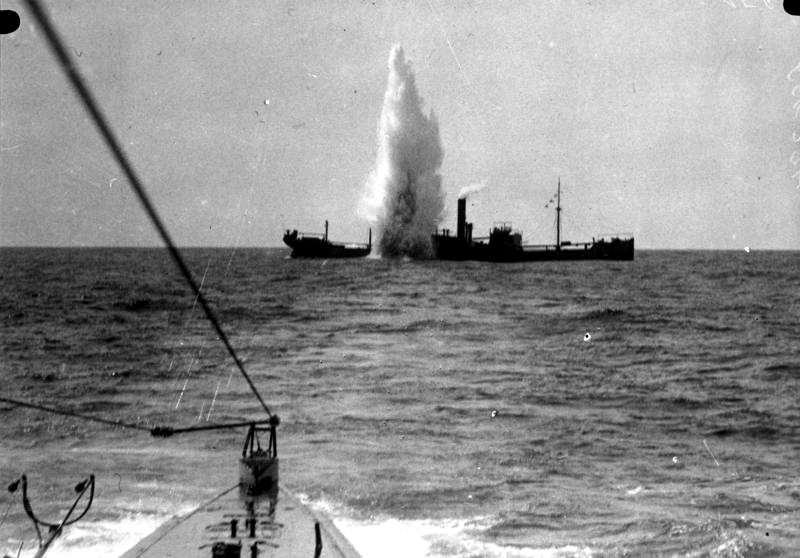
- Maplewood being torpedoed by U-35

History

United Kingdom
- Name: Maplewood
- Owner: Constantine & Pickering
- Port of registry: Middlesbrough
- Builder: Ropner & Sons, Stockton
- Yard number: 503
- Launched: 10 September 1915
- Completed: October 1915
- Identification: UK official number 136078; code letters JLWH
- Fate: Torpedoed 1917

General characteristics
- Type: cargo ship
- Tonnage: 3,239 GRT, 1,911 NRT
- Length: 335.0 ft (102.1 m)
- Beam: 48.1 ft (14.7 m)
- Depth: 23.3 ft (7.1 m)
- Installed power: 278 NHP
- Propulsion: 1 × triple-expansion engine; 1 × screw

SS Maplewood was a British cargo steamship. She was launched on the River Tees in 1915. A U-boat sank her in the Mediterranean in 1917.

== Building ==
In 1912 Joseph Constantine and Warley Pickering of Middlesbrough, Yorkshire took delivery of a pair of sister ships: Thorpwood, launched that January by William Gray & Company of West Hartlepool, and Wearwood, launched that April by John Blumer & Co of Sunderland. In 1915 Ropner & Sons of Stockton-on-Tees built a third ship for Constantine and Pickering to the same measurements. She was built as yard number 503, launched on 10 September 1915 as Maplewood, and completed that October.

Maplewood's registered length was 335.0 ft (102.1 m), her beam was 48.1 ft (14.7 m) and her depth was 23.3 ft (7.1 m). Her tonnages were 3,239 GRT and 1,911 NRT. She had a single screw, driven by a three-cylinder triple-expansion engine built by Blair & Co of Stockton that was rated at 278 NHP. Warley and Pickering registered Maplewood at Middlesbrough. Her UK official number was 136078 and her code letters were JLWH.

== Loss ==
In April 1917 Maplewood left La Goulette in Tunisia with a cargo of iron ore for Middlesbrough. On 7 April U-35 sank her by torpedo 47 nautical miles (87 km) southwest of Cape Sperone, Sardinia. All of her crew survived, but U-35 took her Master prisoner.
