= List of shipwrecks in January 1916 =

The list of shipwrecks in January 1916 includes ships sunk, foundered, grounded, or otherwise lost during January 1916.

== 1 January ==
List of shipwrecks: 1 January 1916
Ship	State	Description
HMAT A2 Geelong	Royal Australian Navy	World War I: The troopship sank without loss of life after colliding with the store ship Bonvilston (United Kingdom) in the Mediterranean Sea near Alexandria, Egypt.
Glengyle	United Kingdom	World War I: The cargo liner was torpedoed and sunk in the Mediterranean Sea 240 nautical miles (440 km) east by south of Malta (35°19′N 19°04′E) by SM U-34 (Imperial German Navy) with the loss of ten crew.
Janet	Royal National Lifeboat Institution	The lifeboat capsized in the Bristol Channel off Oxwich, Glamorgan with the loss of two of her crew. The Port Eynon lifeboat station was subsequently closed as a result of the accident.
Sandol	Norway	The barque was run into by Huelva (United Kingdom) at King's Dock, Swansea, Glamorgan, United Kingdom and sank. Her crew were rescued.

== 2 January ==
List of shipwrecks: 2 January 1916
Ship	State	Description
HMT Mediator	Royal Navy	The naval trawler was lost on this date.
Moltke	Imperial German Navy	The wreck of Moltke on Spiekeroog, 1925 The Vorpostenboot was lost on Spiekeroog.
Salaminia	Greece	The cargo ship caught fire in the Strait of Gibraltar and was abandoned by her crew.
Scot	United Kingdom	The Thames barge foundered in The Swale at the eastern end of the Isle of Sheppey, Kent. Her crew survived.
Spica	Russia	The schooner was driven ashore on the Farne Islands, Northumberland, United Kingdom. Her crew were rescued.
Teheran	Persia	The cargo ship collided with Marietta Costanzo in the Strait of Gibraltar and sank. Her crew survived.

== 3 January ==
List of shipwrecks: 3 January 1916
Ship	State	Description
Geelong	United Kingdom	The ship collided with another vessel and sank in the Mediterranean Sea.

== 4 January ==
List of shipwrecks: 4 January 1916
Ship	State	Description
Coquet	United Kingdom	World War I: The cargo ship was scuttled in the Mediterranean Sea 200 nautical miles (370 km) east of Malta (35°34′N 18°22′E) by SM U-34 (Imperial German Navy) with the loss of seventeen crew of her 27.
Forest City	United States	The 224.8-foot (68.5 m) four-masted schooner burned at San Juan, Puerto Rico. She was sold, rebuilt, and returned to service with the name Charles E. Dunlap.
Leto	Netherlands	World War I: The cargo ship struck a mine and was damaged in the North Sea 0.5 nautical miles (930 m) off the Galloper Lightship (United Kingdom). She sank the next day 12 nautical miles (22 km) east by north of the Galloper Lightship.

== 5 January ==
List of shipwrecks: 5 January 1916
Ship	State	Description
Fridtjof Nansen	Norway	World War I: The cargo ship struck a mine placed by SM UC-10 (Imperial German Navy) and sank in the North Sea 1 nautical mile (1.9 km) south west of the Galloper Lightship (United Kingdom) with the loss of two of her crew.
Hartney W.	Canada	The schooner went ashore on Quinnepeag Rock near New London, Connecticut.
Kanawha	United States	The passenger steamer struck a light tower of Dam 19 near Little Hocking, Ohio that was submerged by flooding of the Ohio River. She flooded but remained afloat drifting down river two miles (3.2 km), grounding on Newberry Island. At that time many survivors were rescued by a United States Army Corps of Engineers boat. She drifted off the island, capsized, and went another two miles to Mustafa Island where she remained. 5 crew and 11 passengers were killed, 45 survived.
Winnegance	United States	The schooner went ashore on Quinnepeag Rock near New London, Connecticut.

== 6 January ==
List of shipwrecks: 6 January 1916
Ship	State	Description
Australian Transport	United Kingdom	The cargo ship ran aground on Samasana Island, Formosa. She was refloated in early February.
HMT Courtier	Royal Navy	World War I: The naval trawler struck a mine placed by SM UC-6 (Imperial German Navy) and sank in the North Sea off Kilnsea, Yorkshire with the loss of twelve of her crew.
HMS E17	Royal Navy	The E-class submarine was wrecked in the North Sea off Texel, North Holland, Netherlands. Her crew were rescued by HNLMS Noordbrabant (Royal Netherlands Navy) and interned.
HMY Hersilia	Royal Navy	The naval yacht was lost in Loch Torridon.
HMS King Edward VII	Royal Navy	HMS King Edward VII World War I: The King Edward VII-class battleship struck a mine in the Atlantic Ocean off Cape Wrath, Sutherland and sank with the loss of one of her 777 crew. Survivors were rescued by HMS Fortune, HMS Marne, HMS Musketeer and HMS Nessus (all Royal Navy).
Winchester	United States	The schooner went ashore off Sakonnet Point, Rhode Island.

== 7 January ==
List of shipwrecks: 7 January 1916
Ship	State	Description
Euterpe	United Kingdom	World War I: The cargo ship passed Great Yarmouth and disappeared on a voyage from Huelva, Spain for Middlesbrough, England; believed to have struck a mine and sank in the North Sea with the loss of her crew of 19.
Portsmouth	United States	The whaleback barge went ashore in the harbor at New London, Connecticut.

== 8 January ==
List of shipwrecks: 8 January 1916
Ship	State	Description
Citta di Palermo	Italy	World War I: The troopship struck a mine placed by SM UC-14 (Imperial German Navy) and sank in the Adriatic Sea 6 nautical miles (11 km) north east of Brindisi.
HMT Freuchny	Royal Navy	World War I: The naval trawler struck a mine placed by SM UC-14 (Imperial German Navy) and sank in the Adriatic Sea off Brindisi with the loss of eight of her crew.
HMT Morning Star	Royal Navy	World War I: The naval trawler struck a mine placed by SM UC-14 (Imperial German Navy) and sank in the Adriatic Sea off Brindisi with the loss of nine of her crew.

== 10 January ==
List of shipwrecks: 10 January 1916
Ship	State	Description
Kate Davenport	United States	After ice broke her anchor chain, the 1,170-ton bark was blown ashore and wrecked at Anchor Point, Territory of Alaska.
Nostra Signora delle Vigne	Italy	The brig collided with Pelion (France) in the Mediterranean Sea and was abandoned. Her crew were rescued by Pelion.

== 11 January ==
List of shipwrecks: 11 January 1916
Ship	State	Description
Corbridge	United Kingdom	World War I: The cargo ship was shelled and sunk in the Atlantic Ocean 140 nautical miles (260 km) west north west of Cape Finisterre, Spain by SMS Möwe (Imperial German Navy).
Farringford	United Kingdom	World War I: The cargo ship was shelled and sunk in the Atlantic Ocean 150 nautical miles (280 km) west north west of Cape Finisterre by SMS Möwe (Imperial German Navy).

== 12 January ==
List of shipwrecks: 12 January 1916
Ship	State	Description
Algerian	United Kingdom	World War I: The cargo ship struck a mine and sank in the English Channel 2.5 nautical miles (4.6 km) south west of The Needles, Isle of Wight (50°46′N 1°20′W). Her crew survived.
Haofru	Norway	The cargo ship ran aground on the Middle Haisbro' Sands, in the North Sea off the coast of Norfolk, United Kingdom. She broke in two the next day with the loss of thirteen of her fourteen crew. The survivor was rescued by the Cromer Lifeboat.
Prudentia	United Kingdom	The tanker collided with Hermione (United Kingdom) and/or HMS Iron Duke (Royal Navy) and sank in Gutter Sound, Scapa Flow, Orkney Islands.
Traquair	United Kingdom	World War I: The cargo ship struck a mine and sank in the English Channel 1 nautical mile (1.9 km) off Dover, Kent. Her crew survived.

== 13 January ==
List of shipwrecks: 13 January 1916
Ship	State	Description
HMT Albion II	Royal Navy	World War I: The naval trawler struck a mine placed by SM UC-5 (Imperial German Navy) and sank in the English Channel off St. Catherine's Point, Isle of Wight (50°38′N 1°34′W). Her crew survived.
Author	United Kingdom	World War I: The cargo ship was scuttled in the Atlantic Ocean 225 nautical miles (417 km) west of Lisbon, Portugal by SMS Möwe (Imperial German Navy).
Dromonby	United Kingdom	World War I: The collier was scuttled in the Atlantic Ocean 220 nautical miles (410 km) west of Lisbon by SMS Möwe (Imperial German Navy).
Maashaven	Netherlands	The cargo ship struck a mine in the North Sea west of the Galloper Lightship (United Kingdom) with the loss of a crew member. Survivors were rescued by Goentoer, Maashaven and Prinses Juliana (all Netherlands).
HMT Rosy Morn	Royal Navy	World War I: The naval trawler struck a mine placed by Cruiser Stralsund and Straßburg and sank in the North Sea.
Trader	United Kingdom	World War I: The cargo ship was scuttled in the Atlantic Ocean 225 nautical miles (417 km) west of Lisbon by SMS Möwe (Imperial German Navy).

== 14 January ==
List of shipwrecks: 14 January 1916
Ship	State	Description
Catahlot	United Kingdom	The whaler was driven ashore at Trinity Harbour, Newfoundland and sank.
Parklands	United Kingdom	The cargo ship ran aground at Kilnsea, Yorkshire. She was refloated on 24 January.

== 15 January ==
List of shipwrecks: 15 January 1916
Ship	State	Description
Ariadne	United Kingdom	World War I: The cargo ship was torpedoed and sunk in the Atlantic Ocean 140 nautical miles (260 km) east by north of Funchal, Madeira, Portugal by SMS Möwe (Imperial German Navy).
USS E-2	United States Navy	The E-class submarine sank at Brooklyn Navy Yard, New York City following a battery explosion with the loss of four of her crew. Subsequently refloated, repaired and returned to service.
HMT Everard	Royal Navy	The naval trawler was lost on this date.

== 16 January ==
List of shipwrecks: 16 January 1916
Ship	State	Description
Clan Mactavish	United Kingdom	World War I: The cargo ship was shelled and captured sunk in the Atlantic Ocean 120 nautical miles (220 km) south by west of Funchal, Madeira, Portugal by SMS Möwe (Imperial German Navy), killing 18 of her crew, and wounding five. 25 or 26 survivors were taken as prisoners of war, and Clan Mactavish was then sunk.
Edison	United States	The 26-ton motor halibut schooner was wrecked at Cape Decision (56°00′10″N 134°08′00″W) in the Alexander Archipelago in Southeast Alaska during a gale with the loss of her entire crew of five.
Larchwood	United Kingdom	The collier collided with Argus (United Kingdom) in the Bristol Channel and sank with the loss of eight of her thirteen crew. Survivors were rescued by Argus.
Leelite	United Kingdom	The cargo ship was driven ashore at Shoreham-by-Sea, Sussex. Her crew were rescued.

== 17 January ==
List of shipwrecks: 17 January 1916
Ship	State	Description
HMT Fulmar	Royal Navy	The naval trawler was lost on this date.
Sutherland	United Kingdom	World War I: The cargo ship was shelled and sunk in the Mediterranean Sea 192 nautical miles (356 km) south east by south of Malta (34°43′N 18°03′E by SM U-35 (Imperial German Navy) with the loss of a crew member.
Varulv	Norway	The cargo ship foundered in the North Sea. Twelve crew were rescued by Stegelborg (Denmark).

== 18 January ==
List of shipwrecks: 18 January 1916
Ship	State	Description
Auvergne	French Navy	World War I: The auxiliary minesweeper struck a mine placed by SM UC-3 (Imperial German Navy) and was damaged at Boulogne, Pas-de-Calais. She was declared a constructive total loss and was scrapped in 1919.
Evelyn	United Kingdom	World War I: The fishing smack was scuttled in the North Sea 35 nautical miles (65 km) south east by east of Lowestoft, Suffolk by an Imperial German Navy submarine.
Flora M.	Canada	The schooner struck Latimers Reef near Stonington, Connecticut.
Foam Crest	United Kingdom	World War I: The fishing smack was scuttled in the North Sea 25 nautical miles (46 km) south east by east of Lowestoft by an Imperial German Navy submarine.
Marere	United Kingdom	World War I: The cargo ship was shelled and sunk in the Mediterranean Sea 236 nautical miles (437 km) east of Malta (35°51′N 19°07′E) by SM U-35 (Imperial German Navy). Her crew survived.
HMS H6	Royal Navy	World War I: The H-class submarine ran aground on Schiermonnikoog, Friesland, Netherlands. She was subsequently interned and later sold to the Dutch, entering service in 1917 as O-8.
Onward Ho	Canada	The 323-ton, 143-foot (43.6 m) steam halibut trawler was last seen suffering heavily from icing on her deck and in her rigging in a gale in the Gulf of Alaska off Cape Fairweather (55°17′N 132°04′W) in Southeast Alaska. She presumably became top-heavy and capsized and sank in the storm. Her entire crew of 34 perished.
Rijndam	Netherlands	World War I: The ocean liner struck a mine and was damaged in the Thames Estuary.
Scotia	United Kingdom	The barque caught fire in the Bristol Channel off Sully Island, Glamorgan and was burnt out.
Sunshine	United Kingdom	World War I: The fishing smack was scuttled in the North Sea 28 nautical miles (52 km) south east of Lowestoft by an Imperial German Navy submarine.

== 19 January ==
List of shipwrecks: 19 January 1916
Ship	State	Description
Leoville	France	World War I: The coaster struck a mine and sank in the English Channel 9 nautical miles (17 km) south of the Kentish Knock Lightship (United Kingdom).

== 20 January ==
List of shipwrecks: 20 January 1916
Ship	State	Description
Edinburgh	United Kingdom	World War I: The sailing vessel was scuttled in the Atlantic Ocean 700 nautical miles (1,300 km) west south west of São Vicente, Cape Verde Islands, Portugal by SMS Möwe (Imperial German Navy).
Trematon	United Kingdom	World War I: The cargo ship was shelled and sunk in the Mediterranean Sea 180 nautical miles (330 km) east by south of Malta (35°24′N 18°09′E) by SM U-35 (Imperial German Navy). Her crew survived.

== 21 January ==
List of shipwrecks: 21 January 1916
Ship	State	Description
Apollo	Netherlands	World War I: The coaster struck a mine and sank in the North Sea 1 nautical mile (1.9 km) south south west of the Galloper Lightship (United Kingdom) (51°42′N 1°57′E).

== 22 January ==
List of shipwrecks: 22 January 1916
Ship	State	Description
Hyak	United States	The launch was lost in a wind storm at Ellamar, Territory of Alaska.
Norseman	United Kingdom	Norseman. World War I: The cargo liner was torpedoed and damaged in the Mediterranean Sea off Thessaloniki, Greece by SM U-39 (Imperial German Navy). She was beached at Mudros but was declared a constructive total loss. Scrapped in situ in 1920.

== 23 January ==
List of shipwrecks: 23 January 1916
Ship	State	Description
Pollentia	United Kingdom	The passenger ship foundered in the Atlantic Ocean. Her crew were rescued by Giuseppe Verdi (United Kingdom).

== 26 January ==
List of shipwrecks: 26 January 1916
Ship	State	Description
HMT Chance	Royal Navy	The naval trawler was lost on this date.
HMS TB 13	Royal Navy	The torpedo boat collided with another vessel and sank in the North Sea.

== 27 January ==
List of shipwrecks: 27 January 1916
Ship	State	Description
Aberdeen	United States	The garbage steamer sank in a gale off Oakland, California. Lost with all eight hands.
Crystal	United Kingdom	World War I: The fishing smack was scuttled in the North Sea 25 nautical miles (46 km) south east of Southwold, Suffolk by SM UB-6 (Imperial German Navy). Her crew survived.

== 29 January ==
List of shipwrecks: 29 January 1916
Ship	State	Description
Aberdeen	United States	The steam cargo ship was driven ashore at San Francisco, California and was a wrecked with the loss of all hands.
Marian	United States	The tug was run into and sunk at Baltimore, Maryland by Vedamore (United Kingdom).

== 30 January ==
List of shipwrecks: 30 January 1916
Ship	State	Description
Maasdijk	Netherlands	World War I: The cargo ship struck a naval mine and sank in the English Channel off the Kentish Knock Lightship (United Kingdom) (51°29′N 1°38′E).

== 31 January ==
List of shipwrecks: 31 January 1916
Ship	State	Description
Arthur William	United Kingdom	World War I: The fishing smack was scuttled in the North Sea south east of Lowestoft, Suffolk by SM UB-17 (Imperial German Navy). Her crew survived.
Hilda	United Kingdom	World War I: The fishing smack was scuttled in the North Sea 14 nautical miles (26 km) east by south of Aldeburgh, Suffolk by SM UB-17 (Imperial German Navy). Her crew survived.
HMML 19	Royal Navy	The motor launch was lost on this date.
Marguerite	Belgium	World War I: The fishing vessel was sunk in the North Sea off Lowestoft by SM UB-17 (Imperial German Navy). Her crew survived.
Radium	United Kingdom	World War I: The fishing vessel was scuttled in the North Sea 25 nautical miles (46 km) south east by south of Lowestoft by SM UB-17 (Imperial German Navy). Her crew survived.

== Unknown date ==
List of shipwrecks: Unknown date 1916
Ship	State	Description
Chasehill	United Kingdom	The cargo ship foundered in the Atlantic Ocean (approximately 40°N 62°W). Her crew were rescued by Mar Adriatico (Spain).
Frederick	United States	The steamer left Louisbourg, Nova Scotia, on 18 January and disappeared. A bottle with nine messages from her crew washed ashore in the Orkney Islands in February indicating the ship sank in the Atlantic Ocean on 27 January. Lost with all 33 crew.
