= HMT Bracklyn =

British fishing trawler

History
- Name: Bracklyn
- Owner: The Brooklyn Fishing Company Ltd., Fleetwood
- Port of registry: (United Kingdom of Great Britain and Ireland) Fleetwood, England
- Builder: J. Duthie Torry Shipbuilding Co., Aberdeen
- Yard number: 401
- Launched: 22 April 1914
- Completed: May 1914
- In service: 1914
- Identification: FD2
- Fate: Requisitioned by Royal Navy as a minesweeper, December 1914

United Kingdom
- Name: HMT Bracklyn
- Acquired: December 1914
- In service: 1914
- Identification: No.1978
- Fate: Sunk by mine off Great Yarmouth, 11 May 1917

General characteristics
- Tonnage: 303 gross register tons (GRT); 122 net register tons (NRT)
- Length: 125.8 ft (38.3 m)
- Beam: 23.4 ft (7.1 m)
- Height: 13.2 ft (4.0 m)
- Propulsion: T.3-cylinder by J. Abernethy and Co., Aberdeen
- Crew: 10 (1917)

Bracklyn was a British steam fishing trawler. Completed in 1914, it was almost immediately requisitioned as a minesweeper by the Royal Navy to take part in the First World War. It ran aground at Great Yarmouth in 1916, but was towed off and re-floated by a tugboat. In May 1917, the ship was mined by a German U-boat and sank, killing the crew.

== Construction and design ==
Bracklyn (Official Number 13688), a steel fishing trawler, was constructed in Aberdeen by J. Duthie Torry Shipbuilding Co. for The Brooklyn Fishing Company Ltd. of Fleetwood. The trawler measured 303 gross register tons (GRT) and 122 net register tons (NRT) and featured a length of 125.8 feet (38.3 m), a beam of 23.4 ft (7.1 m), and a height of 13.2 ft (4.0 m). Bracklyn was launched on 22 April 1914 and was completed a month later in May, being registered by her owners in Fleetwood on 28 May 1914.

== History ==
=== First World War service ===
In December 1914, seven months after her registration, Bracklyn was requisitioned by the Royal Navy for service in the First World War, becoming a minesweeper. On 28 March 1916, the warship and four other civilian ships ran aground on Corton Beach, Great Yarmouth during a period of bad weather. When the weather cleared, Bracklyn was towed off the beach by the tug Lowestoft, assisted by the lifeboat Kentwell. The following year, on 11 May 1917, Bracklyn sank at 52.7°N 2.166667°E after striking a mine laid by UC-1 three days earlier. The entire crew of ten were killed in action.
