= SM U-35 (Germany) =

German U-31 class submarine which operated in the Mediterranean Sea during WW1

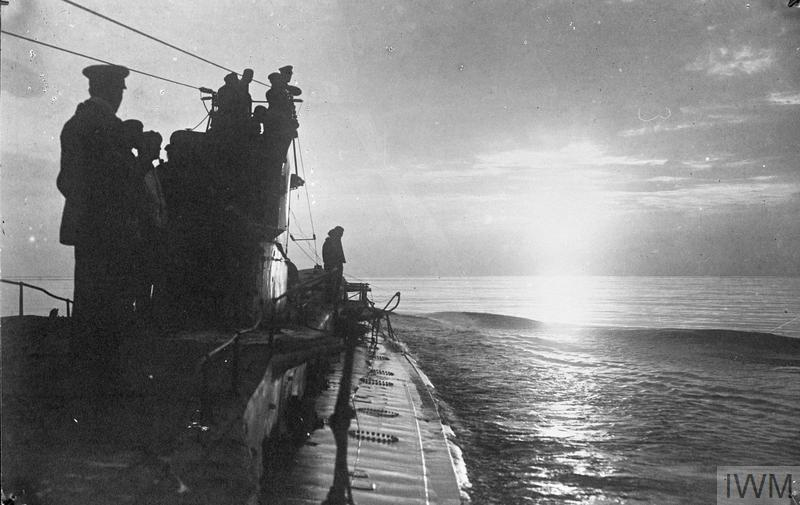
- SM U 35, Commander Lothar von Arnauld de la Perière, cruising in the Mediterranean

History

German Empire
- Name: U-35
- Ordered: 29 March 1912
- Builder: Germaniawerft, Kiel
- Yard number: 195
- Laid down: 20 December 1912
- Launched: 18 April 1914
- Commissioned: 3 November 1914
- Fate: Surrendered 26 November 1918. Broken up at Blyth in 1919–20

General characteristics
- Class & type: Type U 31 submarine
- Displacement: 685 t (674 long tons) (surfaced); 878 t (864 long tons) (submerged)
- Length: 64.70 m (212 ft 3 in) (o/a); 52.36 m (171 ft 9 in) (pressure hull)
- Beam: 6.32 m (20 ft 9 in) (o/a); 4.05 m (13 ft 3 in) (pressure hull)
- Draught: 3.56 m (11 ft 8 in)
- Installed power: 2 × 1,850 PS (1,361 kW; 1,825 shp) diesel engines; 2 × 1,200 PS (883 kW; 1,184 shp) Doppelmodyn
- Propulsion: 2 × shafts; 2 × 1.60 m (5 ft 3 in) propellers
- Speed: 16.4 knots (30.4 km/h; 18.9 mph) (surfaced); 9.7 knots (18.0 km/h; 11.2 mph) (submerged)
- Range: 8,790 nmi (16,280 km; 10,120 mi) at 8 knots (15 km/h; 9.2 mph) (surfaced); 80 nmi (150 km; 92 mi) at 5 knots (9.3 km/h; 5.8 mph) (submerged)
- Test depth: 50 m (164 ft 1 in)
- Boats & landing craft carried: 1 dinghy
- Complement: 4 officers, 31 enlisted
- Armament: four 50 cm (20 in) torpedo tubes (2 each bow and stern); 6 torpedoes; one 8.8 cm (3.5 in) SK L/30 deck gun 10.5 cm (4.1 in) SK L/45 from 1916/17)

Service record
- Part of: II Flotilla; Unknown start - 1 August 1915; Pola / Mittelmeer Flotilla; 23 August 1915 - 11 November 1918
- Commanders: Kptlt. / K.Kapt. Waldemar Kophamel; 3 November 1914 - 12 November 1915; Kptlt. Lothar von Arnauld de la Perière; 13 November 1915 - 16 March 1918; Kptlt. Ernst von Voigt; 17 March 1918 - 13 August 1918; Kptlt. Heino von Heimburg; 14 October 1918 - 11 November 1918
- Operations: 17 patrols
- Victories: 220 merchant ships sunk (505,121 GRT); 3 warships sunk (2798 tons); 3 auxiliary warships sunk (30,581 GRT); 8 merchant ships damaged (35,384 GRT); 1 warship damaged (450 tons); 1 auxiliary warship damaged (1,055 GRT)

SM U-35 was a German U 31-class U-boat which operated in the Mediterranean Sea during World War I. It ended up being the most successful U-boat participating in the war, sinking 220 merchant ships for a total of 505,121 gross register tons (GRT).

Her longest-serving captain was Lothar von Arnauld de la Perière. Under his command, U-35 sank 191 ships, making him the most successful submarine commander in history.

== Design ==
Type U 31 submarines were double-hulled ocean-going submarines similar to Type 23 and Type 27 subs in dimensions and differed only slightly in propulsion and speed. They were considered very good high seas boats with average manoeuvrability and good surface steering.

U-35 had an overall length of 64.70 m (212 ft 3 in), her pressure hull was 52.36 m (171 ft 9 in) long. The boat's beam was 6.32 m (20 ft 9 in) (o/a), while the pressure hull measured 4.05 m (13 ft 3 in). Type 31s had a draught of 3.56 m (11 ft 8 in) with a total height of 7.68–8.04 m (25 ft 2 in – 26 ft 5 in). The boats displaced a total of 971 tonnes (956 long tons); 685 t (674 long tons) when surfaced and 878 t (864 long tons) when submerged.

U-35 was fitted with two Germania 6-cylinder two-stroke diesel engines with a total of 1,850 metric horsepower (1,361 kW; 1,825 bhp) for use on the surface and two Siemens-Schuckert double-acting electric motors with a total of 1,200 PS (883 kW; 1,184 shp) for underwater use. These engines powered two shafts each with a 1.60 m (5 ft 3 in) propeller, which gave the boat a top surface speed of 16.4 knots (30.4 km/h; 18.9 mph), and 9.7 knots (18.0 km/h; 11.2 mph) when submerged. Cruising range was 8,790 nautical miles (16,280 km; 10,120 mi) at 8 knots (15 km/h; 9.2 mph) on the surface, and 80 nmi (150 km; 92 mi) at 5 knots (9.3 km/h; 5.8 mph) under water. Diving depth was 50 m (164 ft 1 in).

The U-boat was armed with four 50 cm (20 in) torpedo tubes, two fitted in the bow and two in the stern, with carried 6 torpedoes. In 1915 U-35 was equipped with a 8.8 cm (3.5 in) Uk L/30 deck gun, which was replaced with a 10.5 cm (4.1 in) gun in 1916–17. The boat's complement was 4 officers and 31 enlisted men.

== Service history ==
U-35's keel was laid on 20 December 1912 at the Friedrich Krupp Germaniawerft shipyard in Kiel. Its delivery date was supposed to be 1 March 1914, but it was delayed due to development problems with its diesel engines. U-35 officially entered service on 3 November 1914, under the command of Kapitänleutnant Waldemar Kophamel. The lead engineer was Hans Fechter. It sailed with the II Flottille, stationed in Heligoland.

U-35 completed its first two deployments in reconnaissance actions in the North Sea. In its following three actions, U-35 sunk 17 merchant ships, for a total of 25,716 GRT. Later, it was paired with U-34 after a battle near Cattaro, Montenegro, and sunk two merchant ships for a total of 3,724 GRT. U-35 made two more voyages and destroyed 13 more merchant ships totaling 51,594 GRT. These included on 23 October 1915 the British transport Marquette in the Aegean Sea. She was carrying an Ammunition Column of the 29th Division; and also staff of the 1st New Zealand Stationary Hospital, despite a British hospital ship Grantully Castle sailing on the same route on the same day.

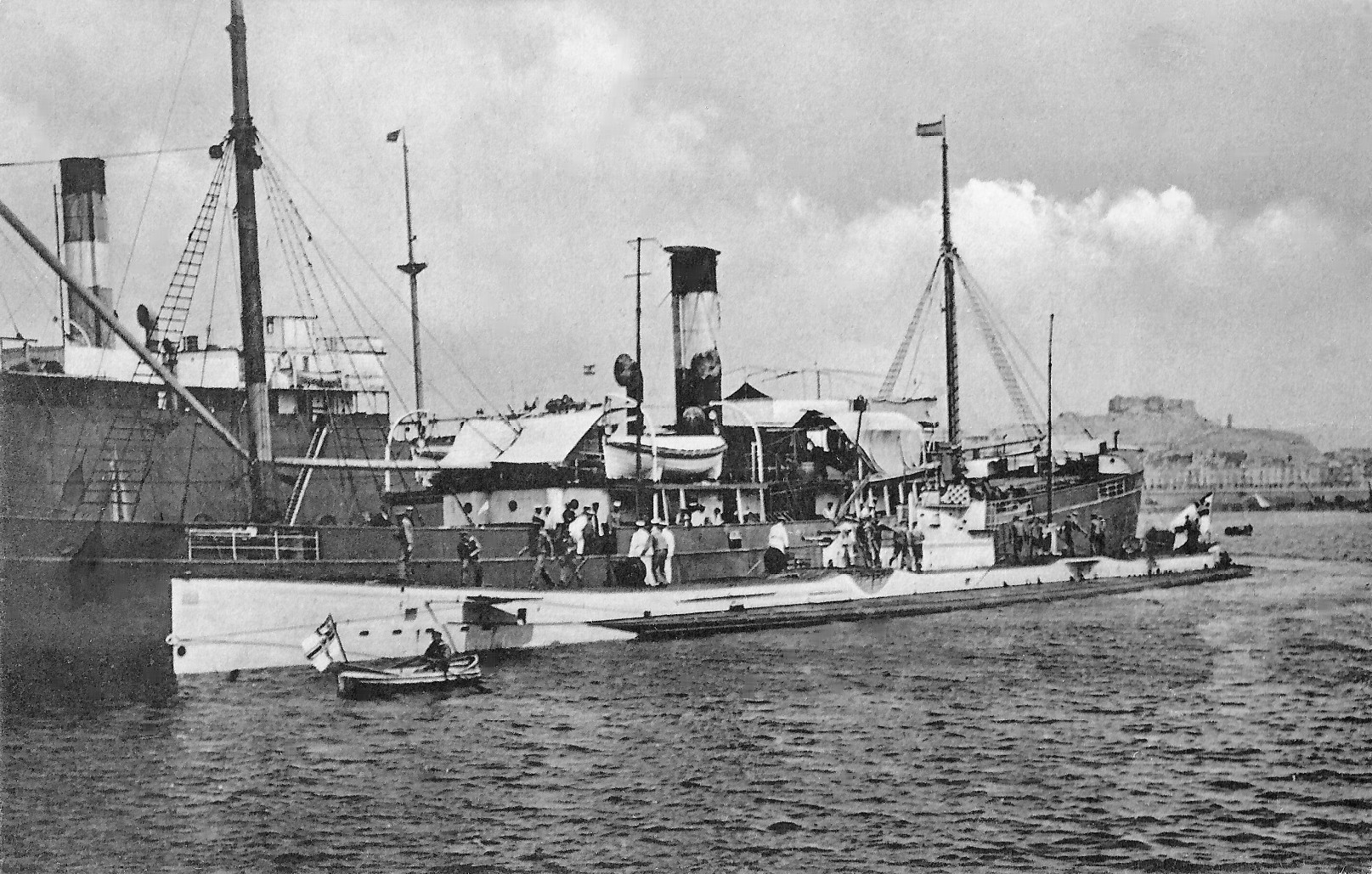
U-35 alongside the German merchant ship Roma at Cartagena, Spain. The visit of the submersible on 21 June 1916 endangered Spanish neutrality in World War I.

On 9 November 1915, with the help of sister U-34, U-35 sank the SS Californian, a cargo ship best known for its inaction during the sinking of the RMS Titanic on 15 April 1912, despite being the closest ship in the area. U-35 delivered a coup-de-grace after U-34 had attacked Californian earlier. She was under tow from a French patrol boat when U-35 moved in to finish her off. Coincidentally, U-35 would also come within close proximity of the ill-fated Titanic's sister ship RMS Olympic on an unknown date in 1916, but "conditions made attack impossible."

On 13 November 1915, Kptlt. de la Perière took command of U-35. He led 15 missions, primarily in the Mediterranean, and sank 187 merchant ships for a total of 417,682 GRT. Additionally, U-35 sank the British gunboat HMS Primula on 29 February 1916 and the French gunboat Rigel on 2 October 1916.

On 26 February 1916, she successfully torpedoed and sank the armed merchant cruiser La Provence, carrying 1,800 French troops, near Cerigo Island with a loss of 990 men.

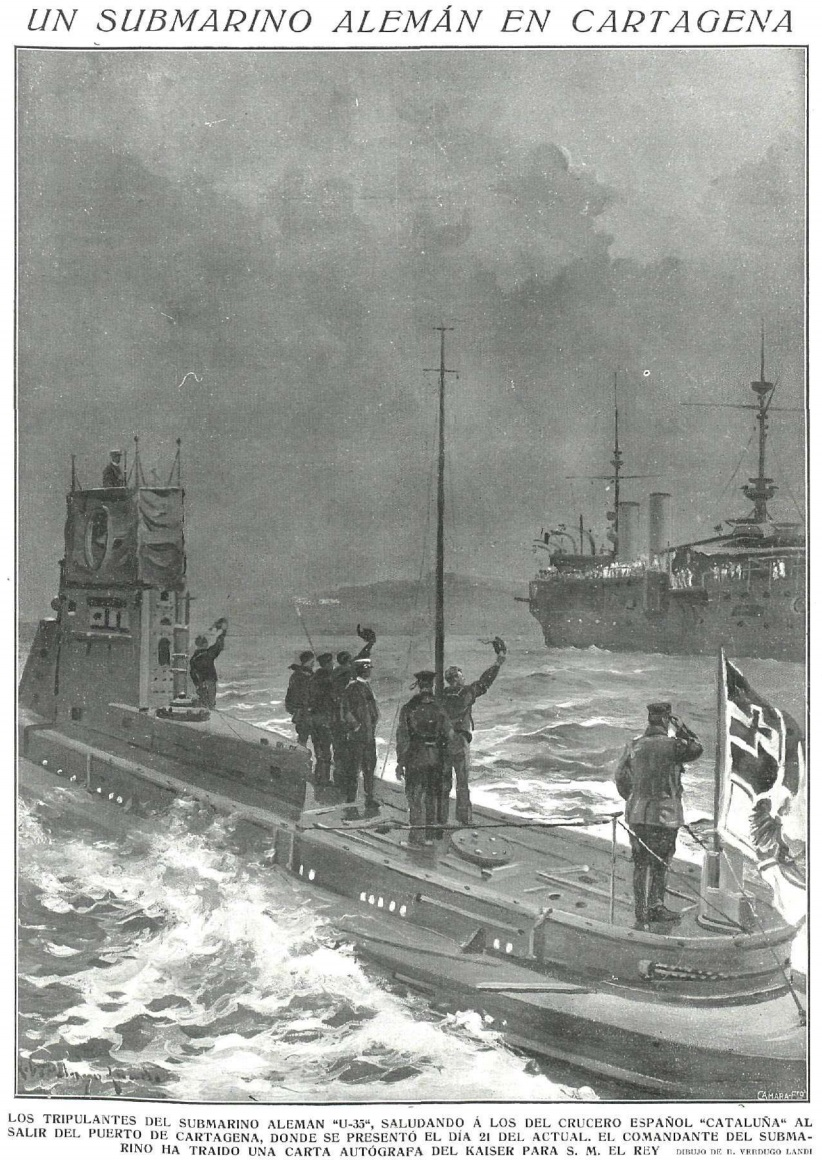
The crew of U-35 salutes the Spanish Navy armored cruiser Cataluña while departing Cartagena, Spain, on 22 June 1916. (Illustration in La Esfera, 1 July 1916)

On 21 June 1916, U-35 anchored at Cartagena, Spain, off the port side of the Spanish Navy armored cruiser Cataluña while delivering a message from the Emperor of Germany, Wilhelm II, to Spain's King Alfonso XIII. U-35 put back to sea on 22 June.

U-35's fourteenth patrol (26 July to 20 August 1916) under de la Perière stands as the most successful submarine patrol of all time. During that period, 54 merchant ships totaling 90,352 GRT were sunk.

She also sank the French transport ship SS Gallia on 4 October 1916, leading to the death of between 600 and 1,800 men.

Kptlt. Ernst von Voigt took command of U-35 on 17 March 1918. He undertook two patrols, an enemy engagement and a redeployment cruise, between 7 September and 9 October 1918, but both were promptly broken off because of engine damage. On 14 October 1918, Kptlt. Heino von Heimburg took command and U-35 was transferred to Kiel.

== Fate ==
After World War I ended, U-35 was transferred to the United Kingdom and docked in Blyth from 1919 to 1920, then broken up.

== Summary of raiding history ==
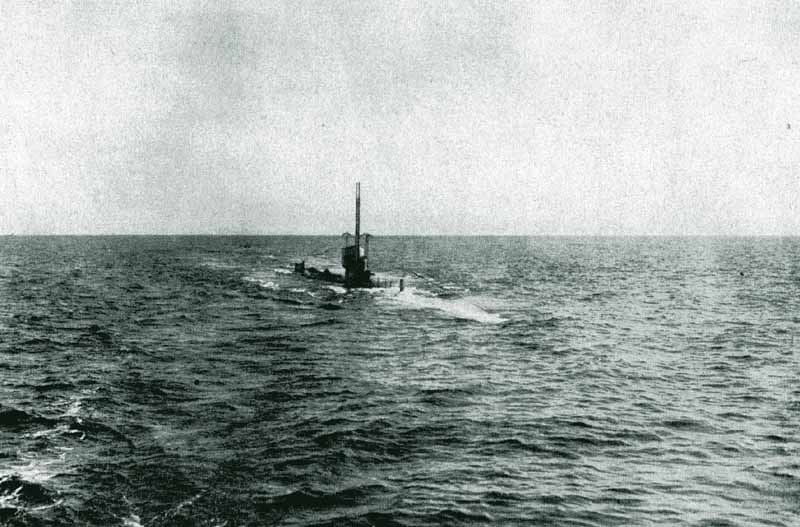
SM U-35 on the surface in the Mediterranean

Ships sunk or damaged by SM U-35
Date	Name	Nationality	(Note: Merchant ship tonnages are in gross register tons. Military vessels are listed by tons displacement) Tonnage	Fate
9 March 1915	Blackwood	United Kingdom	1,230	Sunk
9 March 1915	Gris Nez	France	208	Sunk
15 March 1915	Hyndford	United Kingdom	4,286	Damaged
30 April 1915	Laila	Norway	748	Sunk
2 June 1915	Cubano	Norway	4,352	Sunk
4 June 1915	George & Mary	United Kingdom	100	Sunk
6 June 1915	Sunlight	United Kingdom	1,433	Sunk
7 June 1915	Trudvang	Norway	1,041	Sunk
8 June 1915	Express	United Kingdom	115	Sunk
8 June 1915	La Liberte	France	302	Sunk
8 June 1915	Strathcarron	United Kingdom	4,347	Sunk
8 June 1915	Susannah	United Kingdom	115	Sunk
10 June 1915	Thomasina	Russian Empire	1,869	Sunk
12 June 1915	Bellglade	Norway	664	Sunk
12 June 1915	Crown of India	United Kingdom	2,034	Sunk
13 June 1915	Diamant	France	324	Sunk
13 June 1915	Hopemount	United Kingdom	3,300	Sunk
13 June 1915	Pelham	United Kingdom	3,534	Sunk
10 August 1915	Baltzer	Russian Empire	343	Damaged
10 August 1915	Francois	France	2,212	Sunk
10 August 1915	Morna	Norway	1,512	Sunk
17 September 1915	Ravitailleur	France	2,815	Sunk
19 September 1915	Ramazan	United Kingdom	3,477	Sunk
20 September 1915	Linkmoor	United Kingdom	4,306	Sunk
18 October 1915	Scilla	Kingdom of Italy	1,220	Sunk
23 October 1915	Marquette	United Kingdom	7,057	Sunk
3 November 1915	Woolwich	United Kingdom	2,936	Sunk
5 November 1915	HMS Tara	Royal Navy	1,862	Sunk
5 November 1915	Abbas	(Egypt) Egyptian Coast Guard	298	Sunk
5 November 1915	Nour-el-bahr	(Egypt) Egyptian Coast Guard	450	Damaged
6 November 1915	Caria	United Kingdom	3,032	Sunk
6 November 1915	Clan Macalister	United Kingdom	4,835	Sunk
6 November 1915	Lumina	United Kingdom	6,218	Sunk
7 November 1915	Moorina	United Kingdom	4,994	Sunk
8 November 1915	Den of Crombie	United Kingdom	4,949	Sunk
8 November 1915	Sir Richard Awdry	United Kingdom	2,234	Sunk
8 November 1915	Wacousta	Norway	3,521	Sunk
9 November 1915	Californian	United Kingdom	6,223	Sunk
17 January 1916	Sutherland	United Kingdom	3,542	Sunk
18 January 1916	Marere	United Kingdom	6,443	Sunk
20 January 1916	Trematon	United Kingdom	4,198	Sunk
26 February 1916	La Provence	French Navy	13,753	Sunk
27 February 1916	Giava	Kingdom of Italy	2,755	Sunk
28 February 1916	Masunda	United Kingdom	4,952	Sunk
29 February 1916	HMS Primula	Royal Navy	1,250	Sunk
23 March 1916	Minneapolis	United Kingdom	13,543	Sunk
13 June 1916	Maria C.	Kingdom of Italy	77	Sunk
13 June 1916	Motia	Kingdom of Italy	500	Sunk
13 June 1916	San Francesco Di Paola	Kingdom of Italy	43	Sunk
14 June 1916	Antonia V	Kingdom of Italy	132	Sunk
14 June 1916	Giosue	Kingdom of Italy	20	Sunk
14 June 1916	S. Francesco	Kingdom of Italy	28	Sunk
14 June 1916	Tavolara	Kingdom of Italy	701	Sunk
15 June 1916	Adelina	Kingdom of Italy	170	Sunk
15 June 1916	Annette	Kingdom of Italy	112	Sunk
15 June 1916	Audace	Kingdom of Italy	144	Sunk
15 June 1916	S. Maria	Kingdom of Italy	515	Sunk
15 June 1916	Sardinia	United Kingdom	1,119	Sunk
16 June 1916	Dolmetta M	Kingdom of Italy	48	Sunk
16 June 1916	Era	Kingdom of Italy	1,078	Sunk
16 June 1916	Eufrasia	Kingdom of Italy	71	Sunk
16 June 1916	Gafsa	United Kingdom	3,922	Sunk
16 June 1916	Rondine	Kingdom of Italy	112	Sunk
17 June 1916	Poviga	Kingdom of Italy	3,360	Sunk
18 June 1916	Aquila	Norway	2,191	Sunk
18 June 1916	Beachy	United Kingdom	4,718	Sunk
18 June 1916	Olga	France	2,964	Sunk
18 June 1916	Rona	United Kingdom	1,312	Sunk
19 June 1916	France Et Russie	France	329	Sunk
19 June 1916	Mario C.	Kingdom of Italy	398	Sunk
23 June 1916	Giuseppina	Kingdom of Italy	1,872	Sunk
23 June 1916	Herault	France	2,299	Sunk
24 June 1916	Canford Chine	United Kingdom	2,398	Sunk
24 June 1916	Checchina	France	184	Sunk
24 June 1916	Daiyetsu Maru	Japan	3,184	Sunk
24 June 1916	San Francesco	Kingdom of Italy	1,060	Sunk
24 June 1916	Saturnina Fanny	Kingdom of Italy	1,568	Sunk
25 June 1916	Clara	Kingdom of Italy	5,503	Sunk
25 June 1916	Fournel	France	2,047	Sunk
27 June 1916	Mongibello	Kingdom of Italy	4,059	Sunk
27 June 1916	Pino	Kingdom of Italy	1,677	Sunk
27 June 1916	Roma	Kingdom of Italy	2,491	Sunk
27 June 1916	Windermere	United Kingdom	2,292	Sunk
29 June 1916	Carlo Alberto	Kingdom of Italy	312	Sunk
29 June 1916	Giuseppina	Kingdom of Italy	214	Sunk
29 June 1916	Teano	United Kingdom	1,907	Sunk
28 July 1916	Dandolo	Kingdom of Italy	4,977	Sunk
30 July 1916	Britannic	United Kingdom	3,487	Sunk
30 July 1916	Ethelbryhta	United Kingdom	3,084	Sunk
30 July 1916	Giuseppe Marta	Tunisia	111	Sunk
30 July 1916	Katholm	Denmark	1,324	Sunk
31 July 1916	Citta Di Messina	Kingdom of Italy	2,464	Sunk
31 July 1916	Einar	Norway	135	Sunk
31 July 1916	Emilio G.	Kingdom of Italy	166	Sunk
31 July 1916	Erling	Norway	122	Sunk
31 July 1916	Generale Ameglio	Kingdom of Italy	222	Sunk
1 August 1916	Heighington	United Kingdom	2,800	Sunk
2 August 1916	Eugenia	Kingdom of Italy	550	Sunk
2 August 1916	Neptune	France	151	Sunk
3 August 1916	Tricoupis	Greece	2,387	Sunk
4 August 1916	Favonian	United Kingdom	3,049	Sunk
4 August 1916	Siena	Kingdom of Italy	4,372	Sunk
4 August 1916	Teti	Kingdom of Italy	2,868	Sunk
4 August 1916	Tottenham	United Kingdom	3,106	Sunk
5 August 1916	Achilleus	Greece	843	Sunk
5 August 1916	Mount Coniston	United Kingdom	3,018	Sunk
7 August 1916	Newburn	United Kingdom	3,554	Sunk
7 August 1916	Trident	United Kingdom	3,129	Sunk
8 August 1916	Imperial	United Kingdom	3,818	Sunk
8 August 1916	Speme	Kingdom of Italy	1,229	Sunk
9 August 1916	Antiope	United Kingdom	2,973	Sunk
9 August 1916	Ganekogorta Mendi	Spain	3,061	Sunk
9 August 1916	Sebastiano	Kingdom of Italy	3,995	Sunk
10 August 1916	Temmei Maru	Japan	3,360	Sunk
11 August 1916	Pagasarri	Spain	3,287	Sunk
12 August 1916	Gina	Kingdom of Italy	443	Sunk
12 August 1916	Nereus	Kingdom of Italy	3,980	Sunk
12 August 1916	Regina Pacis	Kingdom of Italy	2,228	Sunk
12 August 1916	Saint Gaetan (aux)	France	125	Sunk
13 August 1916	Balmoral	Kingdom of Italy	2,542	Sunk
13 August 1916	Eurasia	Kingdom of Italy	1,898	Sunk
13 August 1916	Francesco Saverio	Kingdom of Italy	214	Sunk
13 August 1916	Ivar	Denmark	2,139	Sunk
14 August 1916	Emilia	Kingdom of Italy	319	Sunk
14 August 1916	Francesca	Kingdom of Italy	161	Sunk
14 August 1916	Henriette B.	Kingdom of Italy	176	Sunk
14 August 1916	Ida	Kingdom of Italy	242	Sunk
14 August 1916	Lavinia	Kingdom of Italy	243	Sunk
14 August 1916	Louis B.	Kingdom of Italy	212	Sunk
14 August 1916	Pausania	Kingdom of Italy	107	Sunk
14 August 1916	Rosario	Kingdom of Italy	188	Sunk
14 August 1916	S. Francesco Di Paola S.	Kingdom of Italy	113	Sunk
14 August 1916	San Giovanni Battista	Kingdom of Italy	1,066	Sunk
14 August 1916	S. Giuseppe Patriarca	Kingdom of Italy	63	Sunk
15 August 1916	Augusta	Kingdom of Italy	523	Sunk
15 August 1916	Candida Altieri	Kingdom of Italy	282	Sunk
15 August 1916	Vergine Di Pompei	Kingdom of Italy	146	Sunk
16 August 1916	Madre	Kingdom of Italy	665	Sunk
17 August 1916	Swedish Prince	United Kingdom	3,712	Sunk
18 August 1916	Erix	Kingdom of Italy	923	Sunk
19 September 1916	Doride	Kingdom of Italy	1,250	Sunk
19 September 1916	Teresa	Kingdom of Italy	270	Sunk
22 September 1916	Garibaldi	Kingdom of Italy	1,374	Sunk
22 September 1916	Giovanni Zambelli	Kingdom of Italy	2,485	Sunk
23 September 1916	Charterhouse	United Kingdom	3,021	Sunk
24 September 1916	Bronwen	United Kingdom	4,250	Sunk
24 September 1916	Bufjord	Norway	2,284	Sunk
24 September 1916	Nicolo	Kingdom of Italy	5,466	Sunk
25 September 1916	Benpark	Kingdom of Italy	3,842	Sunk
26 September 1916	Newby	United Kingdom	2,168	Sunk
26 September 1916	Roddam	United Kingdom	3,218	Sunk
26 September 1916	Stathe	United Kingdom	2,623	Sunk
27 September 1916	Rallas	United Kingdom	1,752	Sunk
27 September 1916	Secondo	United Kingdom	3,912	Sunk
27 September 1916	Vindeggen	Norway	2,610	Sunk
29 September 1916	Venus	Kingdom of Italy	3,976	Sunk
2 October 1916	Rigel	French Navy	1,250	Sunk
3 October 1916	Samos	Greece	1,186	Sunk
4 October 1916	Birk	Norway	715	Sunk
4 October 1916	Gallia	French Navy	14,966	Sunk
5 October 1916	Aurora	Kingdom of Italy	2,806	Sunk
5 October 1916	Vera	Sweden	2,308	Sunk
5 January 1917	Lesbian	United Kingdom	2,555	Sunk
5 January 1917	Salvatore Padre	Kingdom of Italy	200	Sunk
6 January 1917	Hudworth	United Kingdom	3,966	Sunk
7 January 1917	Mohacsfield	United Kingdom	3,678	Sunk
8 January 1917	Andoni	United Kingdom	3,188	Sunk
8 January 1917	Lynfield	United Kingdom	3,023	Sunk
11 February 1917	Assunta	Kingdom of Italy	132	Sunk
12 February 1917	Lyman M. Law	United States	1,300	Sunk
13 February 1917	Percy Roy	United Kingdom	110	Sunk
14 February 1917	Mery	Russian Empire	178	Sunk
14 February 1917	Oceania	Kingdom of Italy	4,217	Sunk
15 February 1917	Buranda	United Kingdom	3,651	Damaged
16 February 1917	Oriana	Kingdom of Italy	3,132	Sunk
16 February 1917	Prudenza	Kingdom of Italy	3,307	Sunk
17 February 1917	Pierre Hubert	Kingdom of Italy	112	Sunk
18 February 1917	Giuseppe	Kingdom of Italy	1,856	Sunk
18 February 1917	Guido T	Kingdom of Italy	324	Sunk
18 February 1917	Skogland	Sweden	3,264	Sunk
23 February 1917	Longhirst	United Kingdom	3,053	Sunk
23 February 1917	Mont Viso	France	4,820	Damaged
24 February 1917	Dorothy	United Kingdom	3,806	Sunk
24 February 1917	Prikonisos	Greece	3,537	Sunk
3 April 1917	Ardgask	United Kingdom	4,542	Sunk
4 April 1917	Marguerite	United States	1,553	Sunk
4 April 1917	Parkgate	United Kingdom	3,232	Sunk
7 April 1917	Maplewood	United Kingdom	3,239	Sunk
11 April 1917	Miss Morris	United Kingdom	156	Sunk
12 April 1917	India	Greece	2,933	Sunk
13 April 1917	Giuseppe Accame	Kingdom of Italy	3,224	Sunk
13 April 1917	Odysseus	Greece	3,463	Sunk
13 April 1917	Stromboli	Kingdom of Italy	5,466	Sunk
14 April 1917	Patagonier	United Kingdom	3,832	Sunk
15 April 1917	Panaghi Drakatos	Greece	2,734	Sunk
17 April 1917	Brisbane River	United Kingdom	4,989	Sunk
17 April 1917	Corfu	United Kingdom	3,695	Sunk
17 April 1917	Fernmoor	United Kingdom	3,098	Sunk
18 April 1917	Trekieve	United Kingdom	3,087	Sunk
19 April 1917	Sowwell	United Kingdom	3,781	Sunk
20 April 1917	Leasowe Castle	United Kingdom	9,737	Damaged
20 April 1917	Lowdale	United Kingdom	2,260	Sunk
20 April 1917	Nentmoor	United Kingdom	3,535	Sunk
23 April 1917	Bandiera E Moro	Kingdom of Italy	2,086	Sunk
24 April 1917	Bien Aime Prof. Luigi	Kingdom of Italy	265	Sunk
24 April 1917	Nordsøen	Denmark	1,055	Sunk
24 April 1917	Torvore	Norway	1,667	Sunk
24 April 1917	Vilhelm Krag	Norway	3,715	Sunk
27 April 1917	Triana	Spain	748	Damaged
13 October 1917	Alavi	United Kingdom	3,627	Sunk
13 October 1917	Despina G. Michalinos	Greece	2,851	Sunk
13 October 1917	Doris	Kingdom of Italy	3,979	Sunk
13 October 1917	Lilla	Kingdom of Italy	2,819	Sunk
15 October 1917	HMS City Of Belfast	Royal Navy	1,055	Damaged
18 October 1917	Lorenzo	Kingdom of Italy	2,498	Sunk
19 October 1917	Ikoma Maru	Japan	3,048	Sunk
25 October 1917	Fannie Prescott	United States	404	Sunk
29 October 1917	Namur	United Kingdom	6,694	Sunk
31 October 1917	Cambric	United Kingdom	3,403	Sunk
2 November 1917	Maria Di Porto Salvo	Kingdom of Italy	91	Sunk
2 November 1917	San Francesco Di Paola G.	Kingdom of Italy	91	Sunk
11 December 1917	Persier	United Kingdom	3,874	Sunk
20 December 1917	Fiscus	United Kingdom	4,782	Sunk
20 December 1917	Waverley	United Kingdom	3,853	Sunk
23 December 1917	Pietro	Kingdom of Italy	3,860	Sunk
24 December 1917	Turnbridge	United Kingdom	2,874	Sunk
25 December 1917	Argo	United Kingdom	3,071	Sunk
25 December 1917	Cliftondale	United Kingdom	3,811	Sunk
25 December 1917	Nordpol	Norway	2,053	Sunk
23 February 1918	Humberto	Portugal	274	Sunk
26 February 1918	Pytheas	Norway	2,690	Sunk
27 February 1918	Kerman	United Kingdom	4,397	Damaged
27 February 1918	Marconi	United Kingdom	7,402	Damaged
6 March 1918	Daiten Maru	Japan	4,555	Sunk
7 March 1918	Begona No.4	Spain	1,850	Sunk
9 March 1918	Silverdale	United Kingdom	3,835	Sunk
		Sunk: Damaged: Total:	538,500; 36,889; 575,389	

== Bibliography ==
- Gröner, Erich; Jung, Dieter; Maass, Martin (1991). German Warships 1815–1945, U-boats and Mine Warfare Vessels. Vol. 2. Translated by Thomas, Keith; Magowan, Rachel. London: Conway Maritime Press. ISBN 0-85177-593-4.
- Eberhard Rössler: Geschichte des deutschen U-Bootbaus – Band 1. Bernard & Graefe Verlag 1996, ISBN 3-86047-153-8
- Bodo Herzog: Deutsche U-Boote 1906-1966. Manfred Pawlak Verlags GmbH, Herrschingen 1990, ISBN 3-88199-687-7
- Spindler, Arno (1966) [1932]. Der Handelskrieg mit U-Booten. 5 Vols. Berlin: Mittler & Sohn. Vols. 4+5, dealing with 1917+18, are very hard to find: Guildhall Library, London, has them all, also Vol. 1-3 in an English translation: The submarine war against commerce.
- Beesly, Patrick (1982). Room 40: British Naval Intelligence 1914-1918. London: H Hamilton. ISBN 978-0-241-10864-2.
- Halpern, Paul G. (1995). A Naval History of World War I. New York: Routledge. ISBN 978-1-85728-498-0.
- Roessler, Eberhard (1997). Die Unterseeboote der Kaiserlichen Marine. Bonn: Bernard & Graefe. ISBN 978-3-7637-5963-7.
- Schroeder, Joachim (2002). Die U-Boote des Kaisers. Bonn: Bernard & Graefe. ISBN 978-3-7637-6235-4.
- Koerver, Hans Joachim (2008). Room 40: German Naval Warfare 1914-1918. Vol I., The Fleet in Action. Steinbach: LIS Reinisch. ISBN 978-3-902433-76-3.
- Koerver, Hans Joachim (2009). Room 40: German Naval Warfare 1914-1918. Vol II., The Fleet in Being. Steinbach: LIS Reinisch. ISBN 978-3-902433-77-0.
- Bogedain, Clemens (2016). Lothar v. Arnauld de la Perière. Erfolgreichster U-Bootkommandant der Seekriegsgeschichte – Ein vergessener "Kriegsheld"?. Stuttgart: Franz Steiner Verlag. ISBN 978-3-515-11256-7.
