= List of shipwrecks in June 1916 =

The list of shipwrecks in June 1916 includes ships sunk, foundered, grounded, or otherwise lost during June 1916.

== 1 June ==
List of shipwrecks: 1 June 1916
Ship	State	Description
HMS Ardent	Royal Navy	World War I: Battle of Jutland: The Acasta-class destroyer was shelled and sunk by SMS Westfalen (Imperial German Navy).
HMT Beneficent	Royal Navy	World War I: The naval trawler was shelled and sunk in the Strait of Otranto by SMS Orjen (Austro-Hungarian Navy) with the loss of nine of her crew.
Dewsland	United Kingdom	World War I: The cargo ship was shelled and sunk in the Mediterranean Sea 28 nautical miles (52 km) north east of Cape Carbon, Algeria (37°07′N 5°30′E) by SM U-39 (Imperial German Navy). Her crew survived.
SMS Elbing	Imperial German Navy	World War I: Battle of Jutland: The Pillau-class cruiser was rammed, holed and disabled by SMS Posen (Imperial German Navy). She was subsequently scuttled by her crew.
Excellenz Mehnert	Norway	World War I: The coaster struck a mine and sank in the North Sea 5 nautical miles (9.3 km) south west of Winterton, Norfolk, United Kingdom (52°42′N 2°02′E). Her crew survived.
HMS Fortune	Royal Navy	World War I: Battle of Jutland: The Acasta-class destroyer was shelled and sunk by SMS Westfalen and other warships (all Imperial German Navy) with the loss of 67 of her 75 crew.
SMS Frauenlob	Imperial German Navy	World War I: Battle of Jutland: The Gazelle-class cruiser was torpedoed, shelled and sunk by HMS Southampton (Royal Navy) with the loss of 324 of her 329 crew.
SMS Lützow	Imperial German Navy	World War I: Battle of Jutland: The Derfflinger-class battlecruiser was scuttled by SMS G38 (Imperial German Navy) following battle damage inflicted by HMS Invincible (Royal Navy).
Parkgate	United Kingdom	World War I: The cargo ship struck a mine and was damaged in the North Sea 1.5 nautical miles (2.8 km) east south east of the Sunk Lightship (United Kingdom) (51°52′N 1°39′E). She was beached but was later refloated, repaired and returned to service.
SMS Pommern	Imperial German Navy	World War I: Battle of Jutland: The Deutschland-class battleship was torpedoed and sunk by HMS Faulknor (Royal Navy) with the loss of all 839 crew.
SMS Rostock	Imperial German Navy	World War I: Battle of Jutland: The Karlsruhe-class cruiser was torpedoed, shelled and damaged by HMS Achates and HMS Broke (both Royal Navy). She was subsequently scuttled. Her crew were rescued by SMS S54 (Imperial German Navy).
Salmonpool	United Kingdom	World War I: The cargo ship was torpedoed and sunk in the Mediterranean Sea 30 nautical miles (56 km) north east by east of Cape Carbon (37°10′N 5°30′E) by SM U-39 (Imperial German Navy). Her crew survived.
HMS Sparrowhawk	Royal Navy	World War I: Battle of Jutland: The Acasta-class destroyer collided with HMS Broke (Royal Navy) and sank with the loss of six of her 75 crew.
HMS Turbulent	Royal Navy	World War I: Battle of Jutland: The Talisman-class destroyer was shelled and sunk with the loss of 90 of her 102 crew.
SMS V4	Imperial German Navy	World War I: Battle of Jutland: The V1-class destroyer was sunk.
SMS W84	Imperial German Navy	World War I: Battle of Jutland: The torpedo boat was shelled and sunk with the loss of 99 of her 102 crew. Survivors were rescued by Para (Sweden).
HMS Warrior	Royal Navy	World War I: Battle of Jutland: The Warrior-class cruiser foundered due to damage suffered the previous day from gunfire by the battlecruiser SMS Derfflinger and four destroyers (all Imperial German Navy). The seaplane tender HMS Engadine (Royal Navy) rescued 743 survivors.
SMS Wiesbaden	Imperial German Navy	World War I: Battle of Jutland: The Wiesbaden-class cruiser was torpedoed, shelled and sunk by HMS Invincible and HMS Onslow (both Royal Navy) with the loss of 589 of her 590 crew. The survivor was rescued by a Norwegian merchant ship.

== 3 June ==
List of shipwrecks: 3 June 1916
Ship	State	Description
Golconda	United Kingdom	World War I: The passenger ship struck a mine placed by SM UC-3 (Imperial German Navy) and sank in the North Sea 5 nautical miles (9.3 km) south east by east of Aldeburgh, Suffolk (52°08′30″N 1°44′45″E) with the loss of nineteen lives.
Sevastopol	Imperial Russian Navy	The Gangut-class battleship ran aground off Helsinki, Grand Duchy of Finland. She was refloated with assistance from the tug Useful ( (Russian Empire) Grand Duchy of Finland).

== 4 June ==
List of shipwrecks: 4 June 1916
Ship	State	Description
HMT Klondyke	Royal Navy	The naval trawler was lost on this date.

== 5 June ==
List of shipwrecks: 5 June 1916
Ship	State	Description
Eagre	United Kingdom	The coaster sprang a leak in the North Sea off Covehithe, Suffolk and was abandoned by her three crew.
Eleonore	United States	The passenger ship was struck by a tornado at Easton Landing 18 miles (29 km) above Memphis, Tennessee causing her to capsize. One crewman and 11 passengers killed, 17 missing.
HMS Hampshire	Royal Navy	World War I: The Devonshire-class cruiser struck a mine and sank in the Atlantic Ocean north west of the Orkney Islands. There were only twelve survivors of over 600 people on board.
Lars Jorgensen	Denmark	The brigantine was driven ashore on Sanday, Orkney Islands, United Kingdom and was wrecked. Her crew were rescued. She was refloated on 17 July.

== 6 June ==
List of shipwrecks: 6 June 1916
Ship	State	Description
Carolyn	United States	The cargo ship was wrecked on the Kola Peninsula one mile (1.6 km) south east of the Gorodestskiy Light House near Arkhangelsk, Russia in the Barents Sea.
Flyn	United Kingdom	The coaster foundered in the English Channel off Alderney, Channel Islands.
Oddvin	Norway	The coaster foundered in the North Sea. Her crew were rescued by the fishing smack Aderane Jacoba (Netherlands).
Prosper III	Norway	World War I: The cargo ship struck two mines and sank in the Bay of Biscay with the loss of all but one of her crew. The survivor was rescued by Lutece (France).

== 7 June ==
List of shipwrecks: 7 June 1916
Ship	State	Description
Aamot	Norway	The cargo ship was driven ashore off Loshavn, Vest-Agder. Her crew were rescued.

== 8 June ==
List of shipwrecks: 8 June 1916
Ship	State	Description
Cementcrug	Imperial Russian Navy	World War I: The transport ship was torpedoed and sunk in the Black Sea 4 nautical miles (7.4 km) south east of Tuapse by SM U-38 (Imperial German Navy).
Ekaterina	Russia	World War I: The sailing vessel was sunk in the Psezuape Estuary, Black Sea by SM U-38 (Imperial German Navy).
HMT Kaphreda	Royal Navy	World War I: The 125-foot (38 m) 245-ton naval trawler struck a mine placed by SM UC-6 (Imperial German Navy) and sank in the North Sea off the Corton Lightship (United Kingdom) (52°31′45″N 1°50′00″E) with the loss of six of her crew.
Malorossija	Imperial Russian Navy	World War I: The ship was shelled and damaged in the Black Sea by SM U-38 (Imperial German Navy). She was beached in the Mokopse Estuary.
Principe Umberto	Regia Marina	World War I: The wartime merchant ship was torpedoed and sunk in the Adriatic Sea (40°19′N 19°10′E) by SM U-5 (Austro-Hungarian Navy) with heavy loss of life in the worst naval disaster of the war in terms of human life lost.
Vera	Imperial Russian Navy	World War I: The transport ship was shelled and damaged in the Black Sea by SM U-38 (Imperial German Navy). She was beached in the Mokopse Estuary.
Heidi	Sweden	World War I: The wooden schooner struck a mine in the Baltic Sea close to the Stockholm archipelago and was split in two. The crew was saved. The aft part of the hull was floating on the cargo and later towed to port.

== 9 June ==
List of shipwrecks: 9 June 1916
Ship	State	Description
Orkedal	Norway	World War I: The cargo ship was torpedoed and sunk in the North Sea by a German submarine. Her 33 crew were rescued by the trawler Bruinvisch (Netherlands).

== 10 June ==
List of shipwrecks: 10 June 1916
Ship	State	Description
Orion	Russia	World War I: The cargo ship was sunk in the Black Sea off Gagri by SM U-38 (Imperial German Navy).
Para	Sweden	World War I: The wooden schooner struck a mine in the Baltic Sea close to the Almagrundet lightship, split in two and sank within a minute. Her fifteen crew survived.

== 11 June ==
List of shipwrecks: 11 June 1916
Ship	State	Description
Emmy	Sweden	World War I: The cargo ship struck a mine close to Falsterbo in the Baltic Sea. Five of her crew perished.

== 12 June ==
List of shipwrecks: 12 June 1916
Ship	State	Description
Ellvira	United States	The 12-gross register ton, 31.5-foot (9.6 m) motor vessel was wrecked on the coast of Montague Island off the south-central coast of the Territory of Alaska. All four people on board survived.

== 13 June ==
List of shipwrecks: 13 June 1916
Ship	State	Description
SMS Herman	Imperial German Navy	World War I: The decoy vessel was sunk in the Baltic Sea by four Imperial Russian Navy destroyers with the loss of about 60 of her 90 crew.
Maria C.	Italy	World War I: The sailing vessel was sunk in the Tyrrhenian Sea east of Ustica by SM U-35 (Imperial German Navy).
Motia	Italy	World War I: The coaster was sunk in the Tyrrhenian Sea 10 nautical miles (19 km) north of Ustica by SM U-35 (Imperial German Navy). Her crew survived.
San Francesco di Paola	Italy	World War I: The sailing vessel was sunk in the Tyrrhenian Sea (39°50′N 13°45′E) by SM U-35 (Imperial German Navy).

== 14 June ==
List of shipwrecks: 14 June 1916
Ship	State	Description
Antonia V	Italy	World War I: The schooner was sunk in the Tyrrhenian Sea (42°05′N 13°00′E) by SM U-35 (Imperial German Navy).
Bear	United States	The passenger ship was wrecked on Sugarloaf Rock in dense fog off Cape Mendocino. The ship was later raised, or boilers, equipment and some of the cargo salvaged. Five passengers were killed when a lifeboat swamped, or two collided and capsized.
Giosue	Italy	World War I: The sailing vessel was sunk in the Tyrrhenian Sea (41°00′N 11°35′E) by SM U-35 (Imperial German Navy).
S. Francesco	Italy	World War I: The sailing vessel was sunk in the Tyrrhenian Sea (41°15′N 12°00′E) by SM U-35 (Imperial German Navy).
Tavolara	Italy	World War I: The coaster was sunk in the Tyrrhenian Sea 20 nautical miles (37 km) off Civitavecchia, Lazio (41°50′N 14°25′E) by SM U-35 (Imperial German Navy). Her crew survived.

== 15 June ==
List of shipwrecks: 15 June 1916
Ship	State	Description
Adelina	Italy	World War I: The sailing vessel was sunk in the Pionbino Channel (43°00′N 10°05′E) by SM U-35 (Imperial German Navy).
Annetta	Italy	World War I: The sailing vessel was sunk in the Ligurian Sea (43°10′N 10°05′E) by SM U-35 (Imperial German Navy). Her crew survived.
Audace	Italy	World War I: The sailing vessel was sunk in the Mediterranean Sea 30 nautical miles (56 km) off Cape Corse, Corsica, France (43°30′N 9°15′E) by SM U-35 (Imperial German Navy).
Sardinia	United Kingdom	World War I: The cargo ship was shelled and sunk in the Mediterranean Sea 38 nautical miles (70 km) west of Gorgona, Italy (43°30′N 8°50′E) by SM U-35 (Imperial German Navy). Her crew survived.
S. Maria	Italy	World War I: The barque was sunk in the Mediterranean Sea 10 nautical miles (19 km) north of Cape Corse by SM U-35 (Imperial German Navy).
Wakefield	United States	The steamer struck a sunken piling and sank in shallow water at Mathias Point, Virginia. The vessel was scheduled to be raised.

== 16 June ==
List of shipwrecks: 16 June 1916
Ship	State	Description
Dolmetta M	Italy	World War I: The sailing vessel was sunk in the Ligurian Sea 10 nautical miles (19 km) south of Porto Maurizio, Liguria by SM U-35 (Imperial German Navy).
Era	Italy	World War I: The barque was sunk in the Ligurian Sea 10 nautical miles (19 km) south of Porto Maurizio by SM U-35 (Imperial German Navy).
Eufrasia	Italy	World War I: The sailing vessel was sunk in the Mediterranean Sea 30 nautical miles (56 km) north of Caboi, Corsica (43°00′N 8°45′E) by SM U-35 (Imperial German Navy).
Gafsa	United Kingdom	World War I: The cargo ship was shelled and sunk in the Ligurian Sea 40 nautical miles (74 km) south of Porto Maurizio (43°15′N 8°15′E) by SM U-35 (Imperial German Navy). Her crew survived.
Rondine	Italy	World War I: The sailing vessel was sunk in the Ligurian Sea 20 nautical miles (37 km) south east of Porto Maurizio by SM U-35 (Imperial German Navy).

== 17 June ==
List of shipwrecks: 17 June 1916
Ship	State	Description
Poviga	Italy	World War I: The cargo ship was sunk in the Mediterranean Sea 72 nautical miles (133 km) off the Porquerolles (41°45′N 6°30′E) by SM U-35 (Imperial German Navy). Her crew survived.

== 18 June ==
List of shipwrecks: 18 June 1916
Ship	State	Description
Aquila	Norway	World War I: The cargo ship was sunk in the Mediterranean Sea 100 nautical miles (190 km) off Marseille, Bouches-du-Rhône, France (41°15′N 5°30′E) by SM U-35 (Imperial German Navy). Her crew survived.
Beachy	United Kingdom	World War I: The cargo ship was torpedoed and sunk in the Mediterranean Sea 98 nautical miles (181 km) north east by east of Mahón, Menorca, Spain (40°50′N 5°40′E) by SM U-35 (Imperial German Navy). Her crew survived.
HMS Eden	Royal Navy	The River-class destroyer collided with France (France) in the English Channel off Fécamp, Seine-Inférieure, France and sank.
Mendibil-Mendi	Spain	World War I: The cargo ship struck a mine and sank in the North Sea off the Shipwash Lightship (United Kingdom) (52°09′N 1°46′E). Her crew survived.
Olga	France	World War I: The cargo ship was sunk in the Mediterranean Sea 110 nautical miles (200 km) west by south of Cape Felene (41°00′N 5°55′E) by SM U-35 (Imperial German Navy). Her crew survived.
Rona	United Kingdom	World War I: The cargo ship was shelled and sunk in the Mediterranean Sea 212 nautical miles (393 km) east by south of the Capo de Melle (40°55′N 5°45′E) by SM U-35 (Imperial German Navy). Her crew survived.
Seaconnet	United States	World War I: The cargo ship was sunk by a mine in the North Sea off Scroby Sand or 60 miles (97 km) east of Great Yarmouth.

== 19 June ==
List of shipwrecks: 19 June 1916
Ship	State	Description
Corton Lightship	United Kingdom	World War I: The lightship struck a mine placed by SM UC-6 (Imperial German Navy) and sank in the North Sea 4 nautical miles (7.4 km) north east by east of Lowestoft, Suffolk (52°31′N 1°50′E) with the loss of five of her crew.
Ems	Germany	World War I: The cargo ship was torpedoed and sunk in the Kattegat by a Royal Navy submarine. Her crew survived.
France et Russie	France	World War I: The three-masted schooner was sunk in the Mediterranean Sea 50 nautical miles (93 km) north of Sóller, Mallorca, Spain (40°45′N 2°40′E) by SM U-35 (Imperial German Navy).
Mario C.	Italy	World War I: The barquentine was sunk in the Mediterranean Sea 30 nautical miles (56 km) off Cap Calabria, Spain (40°32′N 3°45′E) by SM U-35 (Imperial German Navy).
Saint Jacques	France	World War I: The trawler struck a mine and sank in the English Channel off Le Havre, Seine-Inférieure.

== 20 June ==
List of shipwrecks: 20 June 1916
Ship	State	Description
Merkuriy	Russia	World War I: The ship struck a mine placed by SM UC-15 (Imperial German Navy) and sank in the Black Sea 13 nautical miles (24 km) off Odesa with the loss of 272 lives.
Oxelösund	Sweden	The cargo ship capsized and sank in Gefle Bay with the loss of a crew member.
Sadko	Russia	The icebreaker struck a rock and sank in Kandalaska Bay, White Sea. She was raised in 1933, repaired and returned to service.

== 21 June ==
List of shipwrecks: 21 June 1916
Ship	State	Description
Françoise d'Amboise	France	World War I: The barque was sunk in the North Sea 68 nautical miles (126 km) north west of Fair Isle, United Kingdom (60°00′N 3°45′W) by SM U-22 (Imperial German Navy). Her crew survived, they were rescued by a Swedish ship.
Otis Tarda	Netherlands	World War I: The coaster struck a mine and sank in the North Sea 11 nautical miles (20 km) south west of the Newarp Lightship (United Kingdom) (52°39′N 2°10′E). Her crew survived.

== 22 June ==
List of shipwrecks: 22 June 1916
Ship	State	Description
HMT Laurel Crown	Royal Navy	World War I: The naval trawler struck a mine placed by SM U-75 (Imperial German Navy) and sank in the Atlantic Ocean west of the Orkney Islands (59°08′N 3°22′W) with the loss of nine of her crew.

== 23 June ==
List of shipwrecks: 23 June 1916
Ship	State	Description
Burma	United Kingdom	World War I: The coaster struck a mine placed by SM UC-6 (Imperial German Navy) and sank in the North Sea 15 nautical miles (28 km) east of Harwich, Essex (52°08′30″N 1°45′30″E) with the loss of seven of her crew.
Citta di Messina	Regia Marina	World War I: The auxiliary cruiser was sunk in the Adriatic Sea 20 nautical miles (37 km) east of Otranto, Apulia by SM U-15 (Austro-Hungarian Navy). All on board survived.
Fourche	French Navy	World War I: The Bouclier-class destroyer was torpedoed and sunk in the Adriatic Sea 20 nautical miles (37 km) east of Otranto (40°09′N 18°48′E) by SM U-15 (Austro-Hungarian Navy).
Giuseppina	Italy	World War I: The full-rigged ship was sunk in the Mediterranean Sea east of Vinaròs, Castellón, Spain (40°35′N 1°25′E) by SM U-35 (Imperial German Navy).
Hérault	France	World War I: The cargo ship was sunk in the Mediterranean Sea 45 nautical miles (83 km) north east of Cabo San Antonio, Spain (39°25′N 0°45′E) by SM U-35 (Imperial German Navy).

== 25 June ==
List of shipwrecks: 25 June 1916
Ship	State	Description
Bear	United States	The cargo ship ran aground at Cape Mendocino, California, and was a total loss.
Canford Chine	United Kingdom	World War I: The cargo ship was shelled and sunk in the Mediterranean Sea 5 nautical miles (9.3 km) off Calella, Catalonia, Spain (41°35′N 2°45′E) by SM U-35 (Imperial German Navy). Her crew survived.
Checcina	France	World War I: The brig was sunk in the Mediterranean Sea off Barcelona, Spain (41°05′N 2°25′E) by SM U-35 (Imperial German Navy).
Clara	Italy	World War I: The cargo ship was shelled and sunk in the Mediterranean Sea 85 nautical miles (157 km) north of Mallorca, Spain (40°55′N 5°15′E) by SM U-35 (Imperial German Navy).
Daiyetsu Maru	Japan	World War I: The cargo ship was sunk in the Mediterranean Sea off Barcelona (41°10′N 2°45′E) by SM U-35 (Imperial German Navy). Her crew survived.
Fournel	France	World War I: The cargo ship was sunk in the Mediterranean Sea off Barcelona, Spain (41°50′N 5°00′E) by SM U-35 (Imperial German Navy). Her crew survived.
G. W. Robertson	United States	The steamer burned at dock at night at Greenville, Mississippi. All 15 crew survived.
SMS Henny Pickenpack	Imperial German Navy	The Vorpostenboot was lost on this date.
Northland	United States	The 608-ton schooner, or steamer, sank in the harbor at Kake, Territory of Alaska. She was salvaged in 1917 and taken to Seattle, Washington, for repair.
San Francesco	Italy	World War I: The barque was sunk in the Mediterranean Sea 25 nautical miles (46 km) off Barcelona (41°00′N 2°15′E) by SM U-35 (Imperial German Navy).
Saturnina Fanny	Italy	World War I: The full-rigged ship was sunk in the Mediterranean Sea 18 nautical miles (33 km) off Barcelona (41°15′N 2°25′E) by SM U-35 (Imperial German Navy).

== 26 June ==
List of shipwrecks: 26 June 1916
Ship	State	Description
Astrologer	United Kingdom	World War I: The coaster struck a mine placed by SM UC-1 (Imperial German Navy) and sank in the North Sea 5 nautical miles (9.3 km) south south east of Lowestoft, Suffolk with the loss of eleven of her crew.
Panther	Canada	The cargo ship was sunk in a collision with James H. Hill (United States) in dense fog in Whitefish Bay, Lake Superior off Ile Parisienne. Her crew climbed on board James H. Hill before Panther sank.
Novik	Imperial Russian Navy	The destroyer ran aground off Naissaar. She was refloated with assistance from the icebreaker Petr Veliky (Russia), which towed her in to Helsinki, Grand Duchy of Finland, where she was repaired.
HMT Tugela	Royal Navy	World War I: The naval trawler struck a mine placed by SM UC-1 (Imperial German Navy) and sank in the North Sea off Lowestoft with the loss of nine of her crew.

== 27 June ==
List of shipwrecks: 27 June 1916
Ship	State	Description
Geisha	United States	The steamer ashore near Woods Hole, Massachusetts.
Mongibello	Italy	World War I: The cargo ship was sunk in the Mediterranean Sea 50 nautical miles (93 km) off Mahón, Menorca, Spain (39°45′N 5°20′E) by SM U-35 (Imperial German Navy).
Northland	United States	The cargo ship sank at Kake, Alaska.
Pino	Italy	World War I: The cargo ship was sunk in the Mediterranean Sea 60 nautical miles (110 km) off Mahón (39°55′N 5°30′E) by SM U-35 (Imperial German Navy).
Roma	United Kingdom	The cargo ship was sunk in the Mediterranean Sea 50 nautical miles (93 km) east of Menorca (39°50′N 5°10′E) by SM U-35 (Imperial German Navy). Her crew survived.
Waalstroom	Netherlands	World War I: The cargo ship struck a mine and sank in the North Sea 4 nautical miles (7.4 km) north east of the Shipwash Lightship (United Kingdom) (52°06′30″N 1°51′20″E).
Windermere	United Kingdom	World War I: The cargo ship was scuttled in the Mediterranean Sea 58 nautical miles (107 km) south south east of Mahón (39°50′N 5°40′E) by SM U-35 (Imperial German Navy) with the loss of twelve crew.

== 28 June ==
List of shipwrecks: 28 June 1916
Ship	State	Description
Knuthenborg	Denmark	The cargo ship collided with Rhone (Denmark) in the North Sea off Hornsea, Yorkshire, United Kingdom and sank. Her crew were rescued by Rhone.
Mercurius	United Kingdom	World War I: The dredger struck a mine placed by SM UC-1 (Imperial German Navy) and sank in the North Sea 3 nautical miles (5.6 km) south east of Lowestoft, Suffolk with the loss of six of her seven crew.
Serpente	Regia Marina	The Sirio-class torpedo boat collided with Citta di Bari (Italy) and sank in the Adriatic Sea.

== 29 June ==
List of shipwrecks: 29 June 1916
Ship	State	Description
Carlo Alberto	Italy	World War I: The sailing vessel was sunk in the Mediterranean Sea west of Sicily (37°45′N 12°10′E) by SM U-35 (Imperial German Navy).
Giuseppina	Italy	World War I: The barquentine was sunk in the Mediterranean Sea west of Sicily (38°18′N 9°50′E) by SM U-35 (Imperial German Navy).
HMT Hirose	Royal Navy	World War I: The naval trawler struck a mine and sank in the North Sea off Aldeburgh, Suffolk (52°08′10″N 1°42′20″E) with the loss of ten of her crew.
Teano	United Kingdom	World War I: The cargo ship was scuttled in the Mediterranean Sea 24 nautical miles (44 km) north west of Marettimo, Italy (38°15′N 11°45′E) by SM U-35 (Imperial German Navy). Her crew were rescued by Molina (Norway).

== 30 June ==
List of shipwrecks: 30 June 1916
Ship	State	Description
Moeris	United Kingdom	World War I: The cargo ship was torpedoed and sunk in the Mediterranean Sea 46 nautical miles (85 km) south east of Cape Sidero, Crete, Greece by SM UB-44 (Imperial German Navy) with the loss of three of her crew.
SM U-10	Imperial German Navy	World War I: The Type U 9 submarine struck a mine in the Gulf of Finland and sank with the loss of all 29 crew.
HMT Whooper	Royal Navy	World War I: The 126.3-foot (38.5 m), 302-ton steam minesweeping naval trawler struck a mine placed by SM UC-1 (Imperial German Navy) and sank in the North Sea 4.5 nautical miles (8.3 km) north of Southwold, Suffolk, or Lowestoft with the loss of nine of her crew.

== Unknown date ==
List of shipwrecks: Unknown date 1916
Ship	State	Description
Aventino	Italy	World War I: The sailing vessel was sunk by enemy action.
Chinchinella	France	World War I: The sailing vessel was sunk by enemy action.
Dora	United States	The coaster struck a rock off Nyak, Alaska and was beached.
Famiglia	Italy	World War I: The sailing vessel was sunk by enemy action.
Heidi	Sweden	World War I: The schooner struck a mine and sank in the Sea of Åland off Svenska Högarna. Her crew were rescued.
Jag San Espera	Flag unknown	World War I: The sailing vessel was sunk by enemy action.
Nitsa	Greece	The cargo ship struck a rock and foundered in the Mediterranean Sea off Cape Palos, Spain. Her crew were rescued by Albal (Spain).
Sagrado	Italy	World War I: The sailing vessel was sunk by enemy action.
Santissima	Italy	World War I: The sailing vessel was sunk by enemy action.
Svaren	Denmark	World War I: The schooner was sunk by enemy action.
