= SS Wacousta =

Norwegian steam ship

History

Norway
- Name: Wacousta
- Namesake: Wacousta
- Owner: A/S Wacousta Dampskibskompani
- Operator: A/S Wacousta Dampskibskompani
- Builder: Archibald McMillan & Son, Dumbarton
- Yard number: 423
- Launched: 6 May 1908
- Commissioned: 10 June 1908
- Homeport: Sandefjord
- Identification: Call sign MFBV
- Fate: Sunk, 8 November 1915

General characteristics
- Type: Cargo ship
- Tonnage: 3,521 GRT; 1,998 NRT; 5,660 DWT
- Length: 340 ft 4 in (103.73 m)
- Beam: 46 ft 0 in (14.02 m)
- Depth: 24 ft 8 in (7.52 m)
- Installed power: 310 Nhp
- Propulsion: J.G. Kincaid & Co 3-cylinder triple expansion
- Speed: 11.0 knots

Wacousta was a steam cargo ship built in 1908 by the Archibald McMillan & Son of Dumbarton for the Wacousta Dampskibskompani, originally managed by Peter Anton Grøn of Sandefjord, and subsequently transferred to Christensen & Stenseth in March 1915. She was named after a fictional character from a novel Wacousta by John Richardson, published in 1832. The ship was primarily employed as a collier during her career.

== Design and construction ==
The ship was laid down in 1907 at Archibald McMillan & Son shipyard in Dumbarton. The vessel was launched on 6 May 1908 (yard number 423), and the sea trials were held on 10 June 1908 on the Firth of Clyde. On two runs between the Cloch and Cumbrae Lights the ship was able to reach speed of 12.75 knots (14.67 mph; 23.61 km/h). After completion of her sea trials, the ship was delivered to her owner on the same day.

As built, the ship was 340 feet 4 inches (103.73 m) long (between perpendiculars) and 46 feet 0 inches (14.02 m) abeam, a mean draft of 24 feet 8 inches (7.52 m). Wacousta was assessed at 3,521 GRT, 1,998 NRT and 5,660 DWT. The vessel had a steel hull, and a single 310 nhp triple-expansion steam engine, with cylinders of 25-inch (64 cm), 42-inch (110 cm), and 68-inch (170 cm) diameter with a 45-inch (110 cm) stroke, that drove a single screw propeller, and moved the ship at up to 11.0 knots (12.7 mph; 20.4 km/h).

== Operational history ==
At the time of her delivery, Wacousta was chartered by Nova Scotia Steel & Coal Company for a period of 7 consecutive navigation seasons (April through December) to transport coal and iron ore. After completion the vessel proceeded directly to North America departing from Greenock on June 19 and arrived at Wabana 8 days later. She then loaded 5,550 tons of iron ore and sailed to North Sydney arriving there on July 1, 1908. Wacousta was then employed on Canadian route along St. Lawrence River, transporting primarily coal and sometimes steel from North Sydney to Montreal and Quebec City during the summer navigation season. During winters she was sub-chartered to carry cargo along the East Coast of the United States.

Following the end of the summer navigation of 1908, Wacousta left Wabana for Philadelphia with a cargo of iron ore on December 12 arriving there on December 18. From Philadelphia she continued on to New York City, eventually returning to Philadelphia on December 28. Soon after, news about a devastating earthquake in Southern Italy started to appear, and the vessel was chartered to transport necessary supplies. Wacousta left Philadelphia on January 8, 1909, arriving at Torre Annunziata three weeks later. She also went aground upon leaving Philadelphia, but after inspection found no damage, she continued uninterrupted to her destination. The ship spent two weeks in Italy before proceeding back to North Sydney via Rotterdam and Glasgow. Upon return, Wacousta resumed her Canadian route along the St. Lawrence river.

During one of these trips up the river, Wacousta ran aground on the Goose island (Île aux Oies) on September 28, 1909, but was refloated shortly after sustaining only minor damage. The ship had to stay in Montreal for repairs and inquiry which was held on October 3, before she could resume her service on October 10.

On December 18, 1909, the ship left Wabana for Philadelphia with a cargo of iron ore. After unloading Wacousta departed Philadelphia on January 10, 1910, carrying 5,041 tons of coal for Havana. The vessel returned to New York on February 6 after calling at Matanzas. On February 9 it was reported the ship was chartered for coal delivery to Mexico. Wacousta left New York on February 16, stopped at Norfolk to load cargo and departed it on February 22, arriving at Tampico on March 2. She returned to North Sydney on April 12, 1910, and resumed her coal deliveries to Quebec City and Montreal.

On June 6, 1910, it was reported that Wacousta set a new record for travel between North Sydney and Montreal during her mid May trip, being able to complete the full roundtrip, including loading and unloading of 5,600 tons of coal, in approximately 6 1/2 days.

On May 28, 1910, the ship grounded on St. Paul's island, just north of Cap Breton, during heavy fog, but after 5 hour struggle was able to refloat herself without assistance and sailed to Halifax for repairs with damaged front hull plates and water in her forepeak.

In the early part of 1911, Wacousta was again chartered to transport coal. During her first trip, she left Norfolk on January 5 for Mexico, visiting ports of Tampico, Veracruz and Cárdenas and returning to New York in early February. On her second charter, she left Newport News on February 25 with a cargo of coal for Havana returning to New York on March 25. She was then chartered to carry construction materials to the Panama Canal area, and after loading 12,281 barrels and 60,560 bags of cement, the vessel sailed from New York on April 5, 1911, reaching Colón on April 19. Wacousta then returned to North Sydney in early May to fulfill her summer obligations.

On January 16, 1912 Wacousta departed Middlesbrough heading to North Sydney, however, she ran into a hurricane that developed in the North Sea and English Channel around the time of her departure, was severely battered and returned to port on January 19 with a visible list. After repairs were completed she was able to depart on February 5 and return to Canada. For the remainder of 1912 and during 1913 the ship continued transporting coal from North Sydney and Louisbourg to other Canadian localities along the St. Lawrence River and Portland.

In the first three months of 1914 Wacousta was chartered to carry coal between Baltimore and Newport News and Cuba, and transport iron ore back on her return journeys. In April 1914 the ship sailed back to Newfoundland to continue her Canadian service. At the end of 1914 the ship was outfitted for the ice-breaking work in Archangel for the Russian Government, however, the project was abandoned shortly after when it was learned she wouldn't be able to carry enough fuel for the trip.

On January 19, 1915 Wacousta arrived at Baltimore to load cargo for her trip to Europe. She departed on January 27 for Rotterdam and arrived there on February 15 after undergoing inspection the day before at Falmouth. From Rotterdam the ship sailed to England and after loading cargo departed on March 17 for Las Palmas reaching it on March 28.

On March 25, 1915, the ship together with the associated managing company was sold by P. A. Grøn to Christensen & Stenseth of Sandefjord. Around the same time, Wacousta together with several other ships was sub-chartered by Nova Scotia Steel & Coal Company to Barber Line to operate on their South American routes and the vessel was ordered to continue on to Brazil. The ship departed Rio de Janeiro on May 30 with a cargo of manganese ore and arrived in Baltimore on June 18. After unloading the ship went to New York where it was loaded and departed to Archangel on July 10 and reached it on August 4.

=== Sinking ===
Wacousta departed Pictou for her final voyage at about 04:00 on October 19, 1915, carrying 175 boxcars made by the Eastern Car Company and some other railway equipment for Vladivostok in Russia. The ship was originally scheduled to travel through the Panama Canal, but due to landslides the Canal was closed indefinitely forcing the vessel to travel through the Suez Canal instead. The ship had a crew of 25 men and was under command of Captain Konrad Gjørtz-Hansen. On November 2, she called at Oran to refill her bunkers before continuing into the Mediterranean. At about 06:15 on November 8, an unknown submarine appeared firing several shots across the bow. Wacousta stopped immediately, a boat was lowered and the captain rode over to the submarine to present the ship's papers. As the boat closed in, the German Naval ensign was hoisted over the submarine. Following the documents examination, a boarding crew from the submarine went aboard the ship for a visual inspection. After evaluating the cargo, navigational charts and bill of lading, the crew was ordered to abandon ship at around 07:40, as the cargo was deemed to be contraband. The crew disembarked the vessel, and around 12 shots were fired from the submarine's 88mm gun into vessel's stern and starboard side. Wacousta sank stern first around 09:20 in an approximate position 33°46′N 24°43′E. The crew set course for the nearest land, an island of Gavdos, about 73 nautical miles (135 km) north-northwest from the site of sinking. On November 13 they reached Suda Bay where they boarded a British trawler which landed them safely on land. It was later discovered that the German submarine U-35 was responsible for the ship's sinking.
