= SS Ashby (1896) =

British cargo steamship wrecked in 1916

History
- Name: SS Ashby
- Owner: R. Ropner & Co.
- Port of registry: United Kingdom
- Builder: Ropner & Son, Stockton
- Yard number: 322
- Launched: 14 May 1896
- Completed: June 1896
- Identification: Official number: 102748
- Fate: Wrecked off Ushant, 15 February 1916

General characteristics
- Tonnage: 1,947 GRT
- Length: 270 ft (82 m)
- Beam: 39.5 ft (12.0 m)
- Propulsion: Single screw

SS Ashby was a British steel cargo steamship built in 1896. She served as an Admiralty-chartered collier during the First World War and was wrecked off Ushant (Île d'Ouessant), north-west France, on 15 February 1916.

== Description ==
Ashby was built by Ropner & Son of Stockton-on-Tees, County Durham, as yard number 322. She was launched on 14 May 1896 and completed the following month. Her registered owner was R. Ropner & Co. and her port of registry was West Hartlepool. Her British official number was 102748.

The ship was of steel construction and had a gross register tonnage of 1,947. She was 270 feet (82 m) long, with a beam of 39.5 feet (12.0 m). A single screw was powered by a three-cylinder triple-expansion steam engine built by Blair & Company Ltd of Stockton-on-Tees.

== Loss ==
During the First World War Ashby was chartered by the Admiralty for use as a collier, transporting coal. On 15 February 1916, while on a voyage from Nantes to Cardiff in ballast, she was wrecked approximately 2 nautical miles (3.7 km) off the coast of Ouessant (Ushant), north-west France.

The ship carried a crew of twenty. Two members of the crew died, including the master, Captain Samuel John Green, aged 45. His body was recovered from the French coast and buried in Lampaul Churchyard on Île d'Ouessant. He was the son of Samuel and Jane Green of Billingham, County Durham, and the husband of Emma Green of St Dogmaels, Pembrokeshire. A later steamship also named Ashby, built for Ropner in 1927, was torpedoed and sunk in the North Atlantic in 1941.
