= Kentish Knock =

Sandbank in England

Coordinates: 51°40′N 01°37′E

The Kentish Knock is a long shoal (bank, shallows) in the North Sea east of Essex, England. It is the most easterly of those of the Thames Estuary and its core, which is shallower than 18 feet (5.5 m), extends 6 miles (9.7 km). Thus it is a major hazard to deep-draught navigation. It is exactly 28 miles (45 km) due east of Foulness Point, Essex and is centred about 15 miles (24 km) NNE of North Foreland, Kent – both are extreme points of those counties.

== Shape ==
It is about equidistant between, on the one hand, the south-west North Sea tidal amphidromic point (place of negligible tides); and splayed on the other the narrowest point and endpoint of the English Channel (the Strait of Dover) (southeast) and heart of the Tideway (southwest) which have by contrast high tidal range. It is thus among a succession of banks which are aligned NNE to SSW but turn towards the estuary narrowing further west. In line with the erosion and deposition from each such regular tide, its north – its steepest, narrowest part – veers slightly more towards north-south alignment than its south.

== Ecology ==
Made of sand and gravel, it hosts hermit crabs, sand goby, rays and catsharks. In rare species it has visiting red-throated divers. Channels are believed to have been caused by glacial floodwaters many millennia ago. Since 2012, The Wildlife Trusts have been campaigning for recognition of a 37 sq. mi. (96 km^{2}) section of the Knock, known as Kentish Knock East, as a Marine Conservation Zone.

== Scope and soundings ==
Excerpt of a chart of 1934. Here the more shallow the darker shaded. Click for broader map and to enable varied magnification.

To explain the numbers on the inset map a depth of 1_{1} is a formula of six feet (i.e. one fathom) and 1 foot. It is 1 1/6 fathoms. Some of Kentish Knock is, or was, at chart datum "0_{1}". At just one foot in depth it will have become exposed at the ebb phase of most extreme, spring tides.

== Maritime history ==
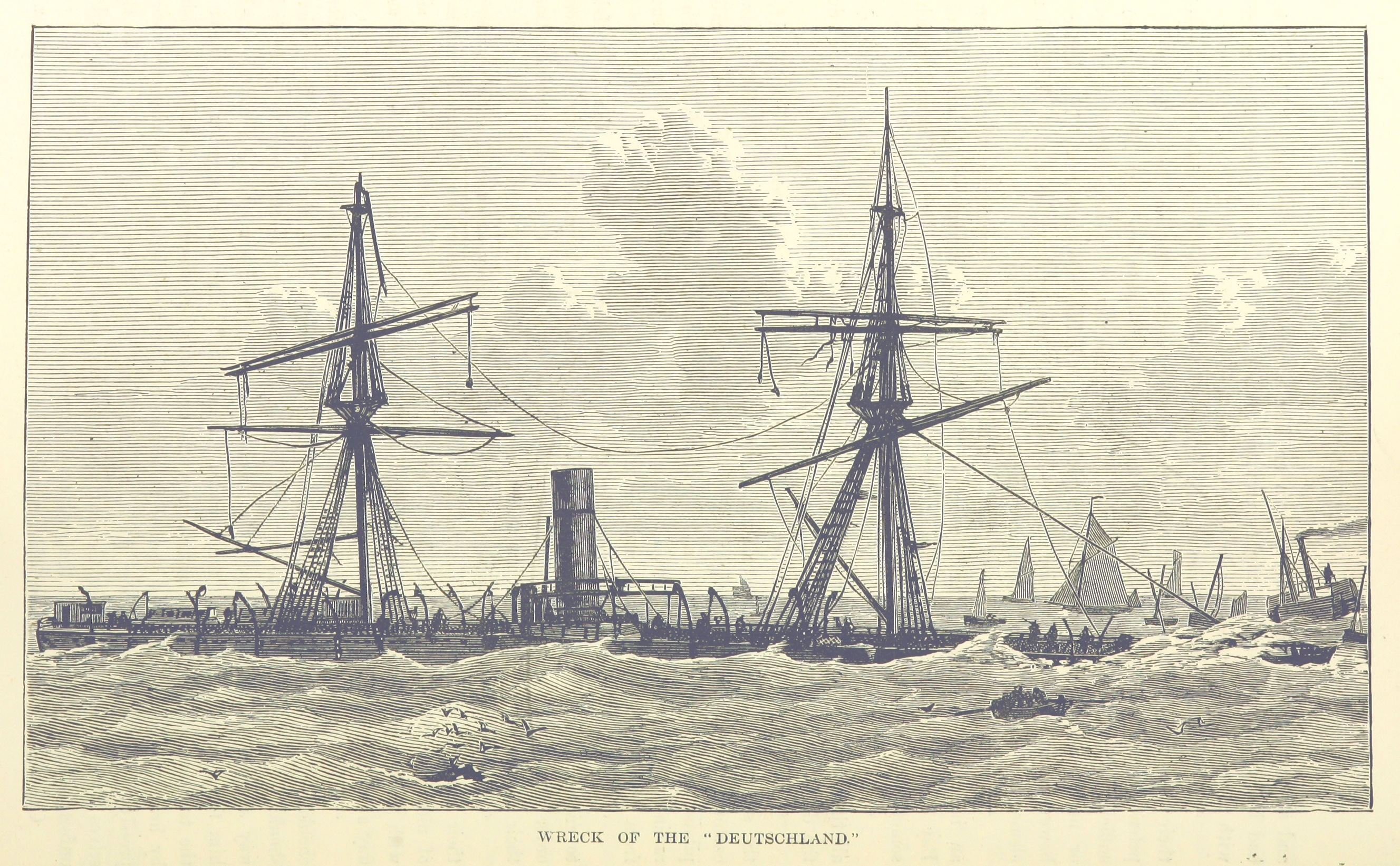
Wreck of SS Deutschland in 1875

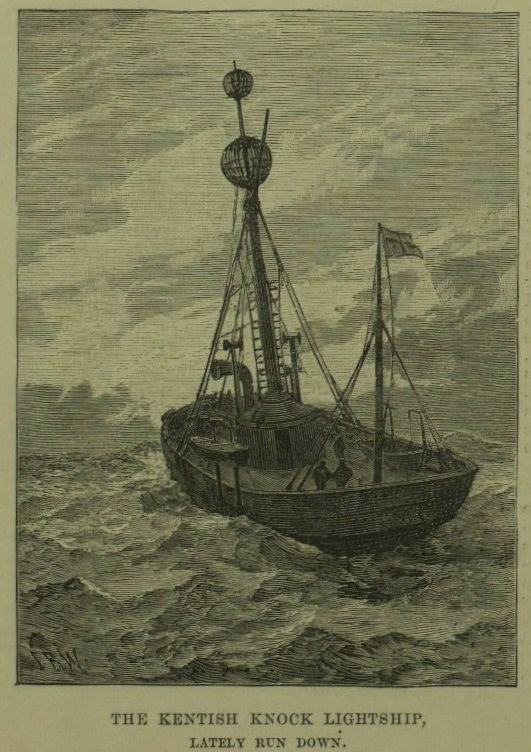
The lightvessel sunk in 1886

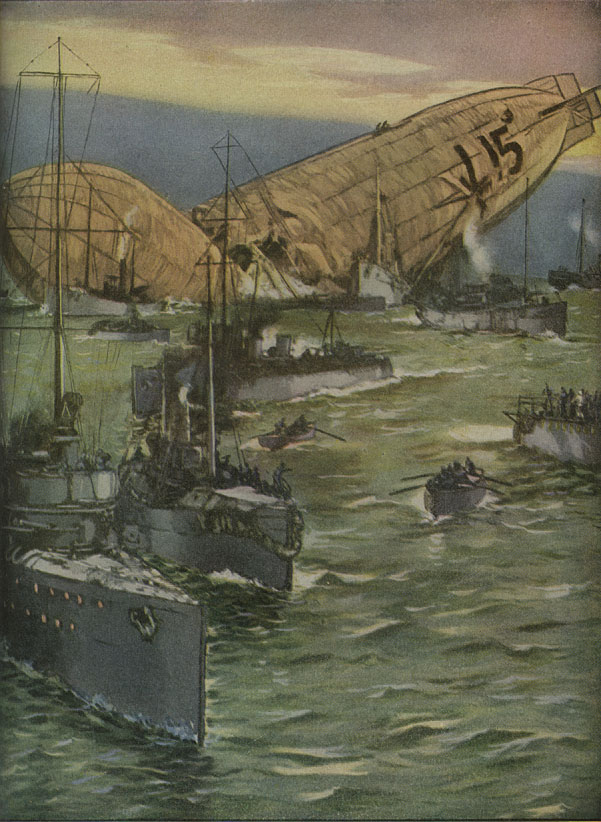
Crash of airship L15 in 1916

Year	Type	Description
1652	Battle	Battle of the Kentish Knock between Dutch Republic and Commonwealth of England
1820	Navigation aid	First reliable mapping of Kentish Knock by triangulation from Essex, by George Thomas
1821	Wreck by accident	British merchant ship, the East Indiaman Juliana
1824	Navigation aid	Buoy placed on the east side of the Knock
1836	Wreck by accident	British ship the Nancy ran aground, broke up, and was washed up at Margate.
1840	Navigation aid	Buoy replaced by lightship LV Kentish Knock
1860	Wreck by accident	Dutch galliott Hillechina
1875	Wreck by accident	German merchant ship the SS Deutschland
1885	Wreck by accident	British Liverpool barque Canoese.
1886	Wreck by accident	Lightvessel rammed by a barque PALADIN, almost cut in two and sank in three minutes. The crew were taken aboard the barque and put ashore.
1892	Wreck by accident	British merchant ship, SS Dilsberg, of Glasgow
1894	Navigation aid	Telephone cable laid from mainland to the lightship
1916	Wreck by enemy measure	German Empire Zeppelin L15
1917	Wreck by enemy measure suspected	German Empire U-boat SM UC-6, likely by mine nets or by British seaplane 8676
1940	Wreck by enemy measure	British G-class Destroyer HMS Grenville after triggering a mine.
1949 to 1953	Navigation aid	Trinity House lightvessel №8 stationed here
1953 to 1955	Navigation aid	Trinity House lightvessel №14 stationed here
1959 and 1963	Navigation aid	A different lightvessel moored here
1963 to 1966	Navigation aid	Trinity House lightvessel №20 moored here
1974 to 1975	Navigation aid	Trinity House lightvessel №23 moored here
1984 to 1991	Navigation aid	Trinity House lightvessel №3 moored here
2011	Navigation aid	By this date a lighted buoy remained
2014	Navigation aid	Phase 2 of the London Array wind farm cancelled to protect rare red-throated divers

== See also ==
- Carnarvon Basin, Australia, where Kentish Knock South-1 is an exploratory oil well in the Mungaroo Sands.
- Dogger Bank, a many-times bigger bank that extends further east, about 150 miles north
