= U14 =

U14 may refer to:

- German submarine U-14, various vessels
- Great cubicuboctahedron
- Nissan Bluebird (U14), a Japanese sedan
- SM U-14 (Austria-Hungary), a submarine of the Austro-Hungarian Navy
- Small nucleolar RNA SNORD14
- α-Methyltryptamine
