= SM UC-3 =

Coordinates: 51°35′N 3°8′W

History

German Empire
- Name: UC-3
- Ordered: November 1914
- Builder: AG Vulcan, Hamburg
- Yard number: 47
- Launched: 28 May 1915
- Commissioned: 1 June 1915
- Fate: Sunk 23 April 1916; Sunk 27 May 1916

General characteristics
- Class & type: Type UC I submarine
- Displacement: 168 t (165 long tons), surfaced; 183 t (180 long tons), submerged
- Length: 33.99 m (111 ft 6 in) o/a; 29.62 m (97 ft 2 in) pressure hull
- Beam: 3.15 m (10 ft 4 in)
- Draft: 3.04 m (10 ft)
- Propulsion: 1 × propeller shaft; 1 × 6-cylinder, 4-stroke diesel engine, 90 PS (66 kW; 89 bhp); 1 × electric motor, 175 PS (129 kW; 173 shp)
- Speed: 6.20 knots (11.48 km/h; 7.13 mph), surfaced; 5.22 knots (9.67 km/h; 6.01 mph), submerged
- Range: 780 nmi (1,440 km; 900 mi) at 5 knots (9.3 km/h; 5.8 mph) surfaced; 50 nmi (93 km; 58 mi) at 4 knots (7.4 km/h; 4.6 mph) submerged
- Test depth: 50 m (160 ft)
- Complement: 14
- Armament: 6 × 100 cm (39 in) mine tubes; 12 × UC 120 mines; 1 × 8 mm (0.31 in) machine gun

Service record
- Part of: Flandern Flotilla; 30 June 1915 – 23 April / 27 May 1916
- Commanders: Kptlt. Erwin Weisbach; 1 June – 26 September 1915; Oblt.z.S. Erwin Waßner; 27 September 1915 – 12 May 1916; Oblt.z.S. Günther Kreysern; 13 – 27 May 1916
- Operations: 29 patrols
- Victories: 16 merchant ships sunk (28,483 GRT); 6 auxiliary warships sunk (2,109 GRT); 2 merchant ships damaged (1,909 GRT)

SM UC-3 was a German Type UC I minelayer submarine or U-boat in the German Imperial Navy (German: Kaiserliche Marine) during World War I. The U-boat had been ordered by November 1914 and was launched on 28 May 1915. She was commissioned into the German Imperial Navy on 1 June 1915 as UC-3. (Note: "SM" stands for Seiner Majestäts (English: His Majesty's) and combined with the "U" for Unterseeboot translates as "His Majesty's Submarine".) Mines laid by UC-3 in her 29 patrols were credited with sinking 22 ships and damaging 2 others. UC-3 was caught in a net, detected by hydrophone, and sunk on 23 April 1916 or mined and sunk on 27 May 1916.

== Design ==
A Type UC I submarine, UC-3 had a displacement of 168 tonnes (165 long tons) when at the surface and 183 tonnes (180 long tons) while submerged. She had a length overall of 33.99 m (111 ft 6 in), a beam of 3.15 m (10 ft 4 in), and a draught of 3.04 m (10 ft). The submarine was powered by one Daimler-Motoren-Gesellschaft six-cylinder, four-stroke diesel engine producing 90 metric horsepower (66 kW; 89 shp), an electric motor producing 175 metric horsepower (129 kW; 173 shp), and one propeller shaft. She was capable of operating at a depth of 50 metres (160 ft).

The submarine had a maximum surface speed of 6.20 knots (11.48 km/h; 7.13 mph) and a maximum submerged speed of 5.22 knots (9.67 km/h; 6.01 mph). When submerged, she could operate for 50 nautical miles (93 km; 58 mi) at 4 knots (7.4 km/h; 4.6 mph); when surfaced, she could travel 780 nautical miles (1,440 km; 900 mi) at 5 knots (9.3 km/h; 5.8 mph). UC-3 was fitted with six 100 centimetres (39 in) mine tubes, twelve UC 120 mines, and one 8 millimetres (0.31 in) machine gun. She was built by AG Vulcan Stettin and her complement was fourteen crew members.

== Fate ==
UC-3 was the first submarine to be detected and sunk using a hydrophone. UC-3's fate have different version: One is on 23 April 1916 she was detected using a hydrophone, trapped in a net, and then quickly sunk after a large explosion. The ship that sank her was the anti-submarine trawler Cheerio, captained by Thomson. Another is on 27 May 1916, she got mined and sunk.

== Summary of raiding history ==
Date	Name	Nationality	Tonnage (Note: Merchant ship tonnages are in gross register tons. Military vessels are listed by tons displacement.)	Fate
5 July 1915	Peik	Norway	1,168	Sunk
14 July 1915	Vivid	Belgium	150	Sunk
20 July 1915	HMY Rhiannon	Royal Navy	137	Sunk
21 July 1915	HMT Briton	Royal Navy	196	Sunk
12 September 1915	Ashmore	United Kingdom	2,519	Sunk
14 October 1915	Salerno	United Kingdom	2,071	Sunk
16 October 1915	Volscian	United Kingdom	570	Damaged
17 October 1915	HMT Javelin	Royal Navy	205	Sunk
25 October 1915	Selma	Norway	1,654	Sunk
6 November 1915	Alastair	United Kingdom	366	Sunk
11 November 1915	Rhineland	United Kingdom	1,501	Sunk
17 November 1915	Ulriken	Norway	2,379	Sunk
29 November 1915	HMS Duchess of Hamilton	Royal Navy	553	Sunk
10 December 1915	Nereus	Norway	742	Sunk
11 December 1915	Pinegrove	United Kingdom	2,847	Sunk
18 December 1915	Nico	Norway	712	Sunk
21 December 1915	HMS Lady Ismay	Royal Navy	495	Sunk
27 December 1915	Hadley	United Kingdom	1,777	Sunk
14 January 1916	Breslau	United Kingdom	1,339	Damaged
18 January 1916	Auvergne	French Navy	523	Sunk
8 February 1916	Argo	United Kingdom	1,720	Sunk
28 February 1916	Thornaby	United Kingdom	1,782	Sunk
26 May 1916	Denewood	United Kingdom	1,221	Sunk
3 June 1916	Golconda	United Kingdom	5,874	Sunk

== Bibliography ==
- Bendert, Harald (2001). Die UC-Boote der Kaiserlichen Marine 1914-1918. Minenkrieg mit U-Booten (in German). Hamburg, Berlin, Bonn: Mittler. ISBN 3-8132-0758-7.
- Gröner, Erich; Jung, Dieter; Maass, Martin (1991). U-boats and Mine Warfare Vessels. German Warships 1815–1945. Vol. 2. Translated by Thomas, Keith; Magowan, Rachel. London: Conway Maritime Press. ISBN 0-85177-593-4.
- Gardiner, Robert, ed. (1985). Conway's All the World's Fighting Ships 1906–1921. Annapolis, Maryland: Naval Institute Press. ISBN 978-0-87021-907-8. OCLC 12119866.
- Tarrant, V.E. (1989). The U-Boat Offensive: 1914–1945. Annapolis, Maryland: Naval Institute Press. ISBN 978-0-87021-764-7. OCLC 20338385.
