= SM UC-5 =

German Type UC I minelayer submarine

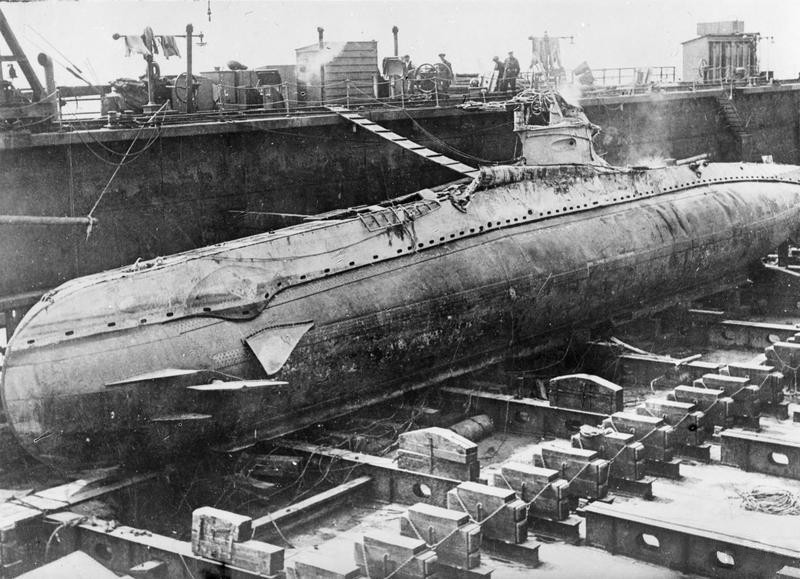
- UC-5 displayed after capture 27 April 1916

History

German Empire
- Name: UC-5
- Ordered: November 1914
- Builder: AG Weser, Bremen
- Yard number: 49
- Launched: 13 June 1915
- Commissioned: 19 June 1915
- Fate: Grounded, 27 April 1916; captured by the British

General characteristics
- Class & type: Type UC I submarine
- Displacement: 168 t (165 long tons), surfaced; 182 t (179 long tons), submerged
- Length: 33.99 m (111 ft 6 in) o/a; 29.62 m (97 ft 2 in) pressure hull
- Beam: 3.15 m (10 ft 4 in)
- Draft: 3.04 m (10 ft)
- Propulsion: 1 × propeller shaft; 1 × Benz 6-cylinder, 4-stroke diesel engine, 90 bhp (67 kW); 1 × electric motor, 175 shp (130 kW)
- Speed: 6.49 knots (12.02 km/h; 7.47 mph), surfaced; 5.67 knots (10.50 km/h; 6.52 mph), submerged
- Range: 910 nmi (1,690 km; 1,050 mi) at 5 knots (9.3 km/h; 5.8 mph) surfaced; 50 nmi (93 km; 58 mi) at 4 knots (7.4 km/h; 4.6 mph) submerged
- Test depth: 50 m (160 ft)
- Complement: 14
- Armament: 6 × 100 cm (39 in) mine tubes; 12 × UC 120 mines; 1 × 8 mm (0.31 in) machine gun

Service record
- Part of: Flandern Flotilla; 27 July 1915 – 27 April 1916
- Commanders: Oblt.z.S. Herbert Pustkuchen; 19 June – 18 December 1915; Oblt.z.S. Ulrich Mohrbutter; 19 December 1915 – 27 April 1916
- Operations: 29 patrols
- Victories: 19 merchant ships sunk (32,407 GRT); 2 warships sunk (1,105 tons); 9 auxiliary warships sunk (3,719 GRT); 7 merchant ships damaged (20,262 GRT)

SM UC-5 was a German Type UC I minelayer submarine or U-boat in the German Imperial Navy (German: Kaiserliche Marine) during World War I. The U-boat had been ordered by November 1914 and was launched on 13 June 1915. She was commissioned into the German Imperial Navy on 19 June 1915 as SM UC-5. (Note: "SM" stands for "Seiner Majestät" (English "His Majesty's") and combined with the U for Unterseeboot would be translated as "His Majesty's Submarine".) She served in World War I under the command of Herbert Pustkuchen (June - December 1915) and Ulrich Mohrbutter (December 1915 - April 1916).

She ran aground and was abandoned but recovered by the Allies and displayed for propaganda purposes.

== Design ==
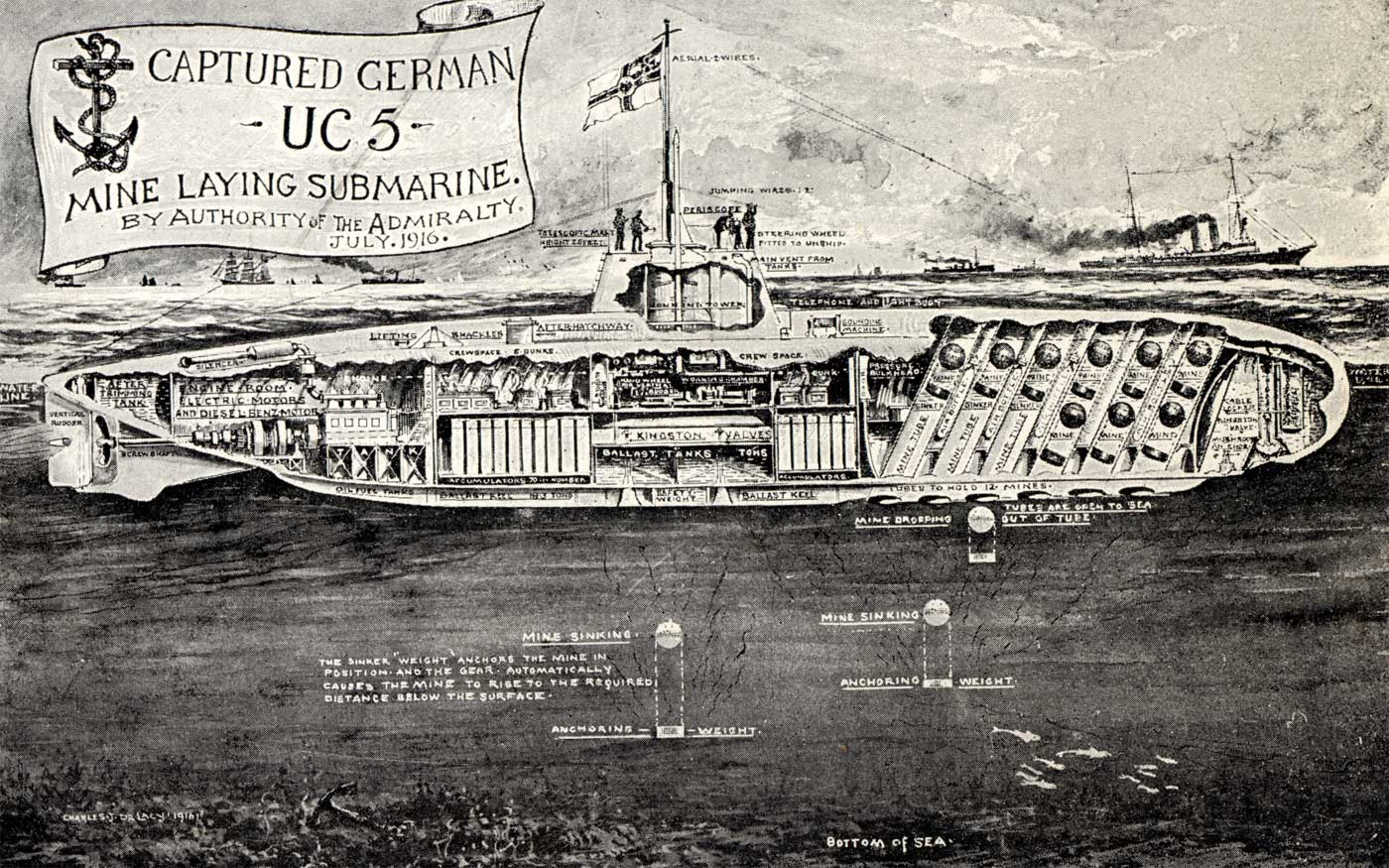
Sketch of the German submarine UC-5

A Type UC I submarine, UC-5 had a displacement of 168 tonnes (165 long tons) when at the surface and 183 tonnes (180 long tons) while submerged. She had a length overall of 33.99 m (111 ft 6 in), a beam of 3.15 m (10 ft 4 in), and a draught of 3.04 m (10 ft). The submarine was powered by one Daimler-Motoren-Gesellschaft six-cylinder, four-stroke diesel engine producing 90 metric horsepower (66 kW; 89 shp), a Siemens-Schuckert electric motor producing 175 metric horsepower (129 kW; 173 shp), and one propeller shaft. She was capable of operating at a depth of 50 metres (160 ft).

The submarine had a maximum surface speed of 6.20 knots (11.48 km/h; 7.13 mph) and a maximum submerged speed of 5.22 knots (9.67 km/h; 6.01 mph). When submerged, she could operate for 50 nautical miles (93 km; 58 mi) at 4 knots (7.4 km/h; 4.6 mph); when surfaced, she could travel 780 nautical miles (1,440 km; 900 mi) at 5 knots (9.3 km/h; 5.8 mph). UC-5 was fitted with six 100 centimetres (39 in) mine tubes, twelve UC 120 mines, and one 8 millimetres (0.31 in) machine gun. She was built by AG Vulcan Stettin and her complement was fourteen crew members.

== Service ==
UC-5 had an impressive career, with 30 ships sunk for a total of 36,126 GRT and 1,105 tons on 29 patrols. On August 21, 1915 UC-5 became the first submarine minelayer to penetrate into the English Channel, laying 12 mines off Boulogne, one of which sank the steamship William Dawson the same day. UC-5 went on to lay 6 more mines off Boulogne and Folkestone on 7 September, one of which sank the cable layer Monarch.

== Fate ==
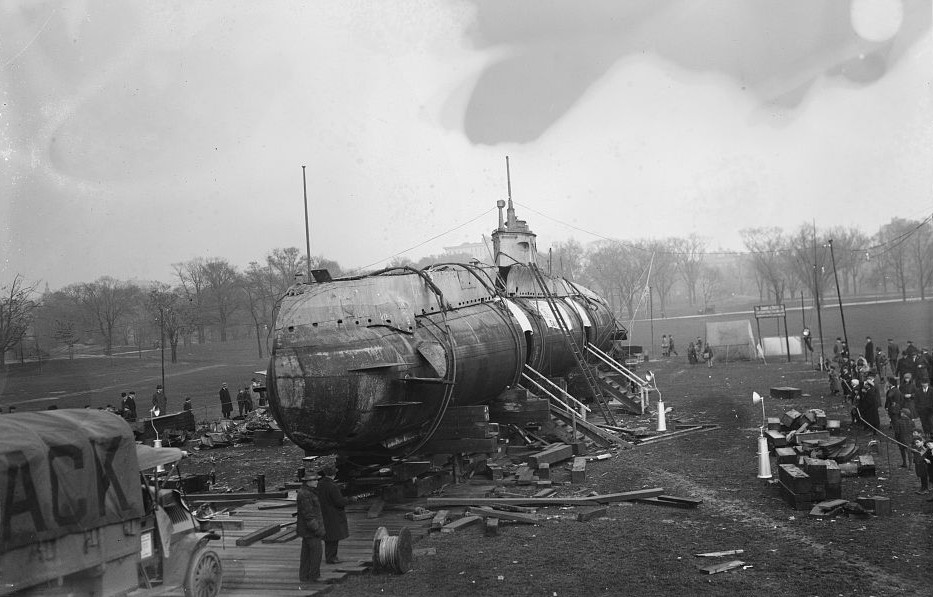
Bow view of UC-5 in Central Park

UC-5 ran aground while on patrol 27 April 1916 at 51°59′N 1°38′E and was scuttled. Her crew were captured by HMS Firedrake. The U-boat was salvaged and put into a floating dock by teams from Harwich and Chatham, led by Captain Young and Lt Paterson--a dangerous procedure because of the two mines still on board. Her captain had also rigged up explosive charges to wreck his ship in the event of abandoning, which the British press described as an attempt to kill the RN personnel who rescued his crew. Paterson was able to find and disable them after being warned by one of the prisoners. The U-Boat was towed first to Harwich, then on to Sheerness, where an approved party of journalists and even two war artists were taken to inspect it. (Refs: Nore Command Records ADM 151/83 at UK National Archives, E F Knight "The Harwich Force", contemporary editions of Daily Telegraph & Daily Mail).

Later it was towed up and displayed to the London public at Temple Pier on the Thames river and, the following year, in New York for propaganda purposes.

== Summary of raiding history ==
Date	Name	Nationality	Tonnage (Note: Merchant ship tonnages are in gross register tons. Military vessels are listed by tons displacement.)	Fate
6 August 1915	HMT Leandros	Royal Navy	276	Sunk
13 August 1915	Amethyst	United Kingdom	57	Sunk
13 August 1915	Summerfield	United Kingdom	687	Sunk
13 August 1915	Sverige	Sweden	1,602	Sunk
21 August 1915	William Dawson	United Kingdom	284	Sunk
30 August 1915	Bretwalda	United Kingdom	4,037	Damaged
30 August 1915	Honiton	United Kingdom	4,914	Sunk
30 August 1915	Saint Chamond	France	2,866	Damaged
8 September 1915	Monarch	United Kingdom	1,122	Sunk
19 September 1915	Tord	Sweden	1,313	Damaged
4 October 1915	Enfield	United Kingdom	2,124	Damaged
6 October 1915	HMS Brighton Queen	Royal Navy	553	Sunk
10 October 1915	Newcastle	United Kingdom	3,403	Sunk
12 October 1915	HMD Frons Olivae	Royal Navy	98	Sunk
19 October 1915	HMT Erin II	Royal Navy	181	Sunk
20 October 1915	HMD Star of Buchan	Royal Navy	81	Sunk
22 October 1915	Grappler	United Kingdom	690	Damaged
23 October 1915	Ilaro	United Kingdom	2,799	Sunk
25 October 1915	HMS Velox	Royal Navy	380	Sunk
17 November 1915	HMHS Anglia	Royal Navy	1,862	Sunk
17 November 1915	Lusitania	United Kingdom	1,834	Sunk
19 November 1915	HMT Falmouth III	Royal Navy	198	Sunk
29 November 1915	Dotterel	United Kingdom	1,596	Sunk
26 December 1915	HMS E6	Royal Navy	725	Sunk
26 December 1915	HMT Resono	Royal Navy	230	Sunk
12 January 1916	Algerian	United Kingdom	3,837	Sunk
13 January 1916	HMT Albion II	Royal Navy	240	Sunk
1 February 1916	Prinses Juliana	Netherlands	2,885	Sunk
15 February 1916	Bandoeng	Netherlands	5,851	Damaged
20 February 1916	Dingle	United Kingdom	593	Sunk
21 February 1916	La Flandre	Netherlands	2,018	Sunk
24 February 1916	Tummel	United Kingdom	531	Sunk
26 March 1916	Hebe	France	1,494	Sunk
26 March 1916	Khartoum	United Kingdom	303	Sunk
27 March 1916	Harriet	Denmark	1,372	Sunk
31 March 1916	Clinton	United Kingdom	3,381	Damaged
31 March 1916	Memento	Norway	1,076	Sunk

== Bibliography ==
- Bendert, Harald (2001). Die UC-Boote der Kaiserlichen Marine 1914-1918. Minenkrieg mit U-Booten (in German). Hamburg, Berlin, Bonn: Mittler. ISBN 3-8132-0758-7.
- Gröner, Erich; Jung, Dieter; Maass, Martin (1991). U-boats and Mine Warfare Vessels. German Warships 1815–1945. Vol. 2. Translated by Thomas, Keith; Magowan, Rachel. London: Conway Maritime Press. ISBN 0-85177-593-4.
- Gardiner, Robert; Gray, Randal, eds. (1985). Conway's All the World's Fighting Ships 1906–1921. Annapolis, Maryland: Naval Institute Press. ISBN 978-0-87021-907-8. OCLC 12119866.
- Stern, Robert C. (2002). Battle Beneath the Waves: U-boats at War. Cassell Military Paperbacks. ISBN 0-304-36228-X.
- Tarrant, V. E. (1989). The U-Boat Offensive: 1914–1945. Annapolis, Maryland: Naval Institute Press. ISBN 978-0-87021-764-7. OCLC 20338385.
