= 40S ribosomal protein S13 =

Protein-coding gene in the species Homo sapiens

RPS13

Identifiers
- Aliases: RPS13, S13, ribosomal protein S13
- External IDs: OMIM: 180476; MGI: 1915302; GeneCards: RPS13
Available structures
PDB	Ortholog search: PDBe RCSB
PDB	List of PDB id codes 4UG0, 4V6X, 5A2Q, 5AJ0, 4KZY, 3J7R, 4D61, 4KZX, 4D5L, 5FLX, 4UJD, 3J7P, 4KZZ, 4UJE, 4UJC

Gene location (Human)
Chr.	Chromosome 11 (human)
Band	11p15.1	Start	17,074,388 bp
Band	11p15.1	End	17,077,715 bp

Gene location (Mouse)
Chr.	Chromosome 7 (mouse)
Band	7|7 F1	Start	115,930,740 bp
Band	7|7 F1	End	115,933,430 bp
RNA expression pattern
Bgee	Human / Mouse (ortholog); Top expressed in: monocyte; ganglionic eminence; lymph node; left ovary; right ovary; canal of the cervix; gonad; gallbladder; fallopian tube; endometrium / Top expressed in: epiblast; embryo; embryo; lens; ventricular zone; spleen; ganglionic eminence; thymus; primary oocyte; neural tube; More reference expression data
BioGPS	n/a
Gene ontology
Molecular function	small ribosomal subunit rRNA binding; structural constituent of ribosome; protein binding; mRNA binding; 5.8S rRNA binding; RNA binding; mRNA 5'-UTR binding
Cellular component	cytosol; ribosome; membrane; focal adhesion; intracellular anatomical structure; cytosolic small ribosomal subunit; nucleolus; extracellular exosome; nucleus; nucleoplasm; extracellular matrix; postsynaptic density
Biological process	viral transcription; SRP-dependent cotranslational protein targeting to membrane; translational initiation; nuclear-transcribed mRNA catabolic process, nonsense-mediated decay; negative regulation of RNA splicing; protein biosynthesis; rRNA processing
Sources:Amigo / QuickGO
Orthologs
Databases	NCBI: entry; OMA: entry
Species	Human	Mouse
Entrez	6207	68052
Ensembl	ENSG00000110700	ENSMUSG00000090862
UniProt	P62277	P62301
RefSeq (mRNA)	NM_001017	NM_026533
RefSeq (protein)	NP_001008	NP_080809
Location (UCSC)	Chr 11: 17.07 – 17.08 Mb	Chr 7: 115.93 – 115.93 Mb
PubMed search
- Wikidata
View/Edit Human	View/Edit Mouse

40S ribosomal protein S13 is a protein that in humans is encoded by the RPS13 gene.

== Function ==
Ribosomes, the organelles that catalyze protein synthesis, consist of a small 40S subunit and a large 60S subunit. Together these subunits are composed of 4 RNA species and approximately 80 structurally distinct proteins. This gene encodes a ribosomal protein that is a component of the 40S subunit. The protein belongs to the S15P family of ribosomal proteins. It is located in the cytoplasm. The protein has been shown to bind to the 5.8S rRNA in rat. The gene product of the E. coli ortholog (ribosomal protein S15) functions at early steps in ribosome assembly. This gene is co-transcribed with two U14 small nucleolar RNA genes, which are located in its third and fifth introns. As is typical for genes encoding ribosomal proteins, there are multiple processed pseudogenes of this gene dispersed through the genome.

== Interactions ==
RPS13 has been shown to interact with PDCD4.
