= German submarine U-9 =

U-9 may refer to one of the following German submarines:

- SM U-9, was the lead boat of the Type U 9 submarines; launched in 1910 and served in the First World War until surrendered on 26 November 1918, and famous for the action of 22 September 1914
  - During the First World War, Germany also had these submarines with similar names:
    - SM UB-9, a Type UB I submarine launched in 1915 and stricken on 19 February 1919
    - SM UC-9, a Type UC I submarine launched in 1915 and sunk 20 October 1915
- German submarine U-9 (1935), a Type IIB submarine that served in the Second World War and sank on 20 August 1944
- German submarine U-9 (S188), a Type 205 submarine of the Bundesmarine that was launched in 1967; decommissioned in 1993; now a museum ship in Speyer, see Technikmuseum Speyer.

U-9 or U-IX may also refer to:

- U-IX, an Austro-Hungarian Navy submarine
