= U9 =

U-9 or U9 may refer to:

- German submarine U-9, the designation of several German U-boats
- U-9, a U.S. Army designation for the Aero Commander 500, a light twin-engined aircraft
- U9, the IATA code for Tatarstan Airlines
- U9 (Berlin U-Bahn), a subway line in Berlin, Germany
- U9, a model of the Motorola ROKR cell phone
- Ultima IX: Ascension, a video game
- U9 League, a private university alliance in Taiwan.
- Yangwang U9, an electric supercar produced by BYD Auto
- MGU9, a pickup truck produced by SAIC Motor and marketed in Australia
- U9 Myanmar, a telecommunications company by Nine Communications in Myanmar
- London Buses route U9

== See also ==
- 9U (disambiguation)
