= SS Golconda (1887) =

Golconda
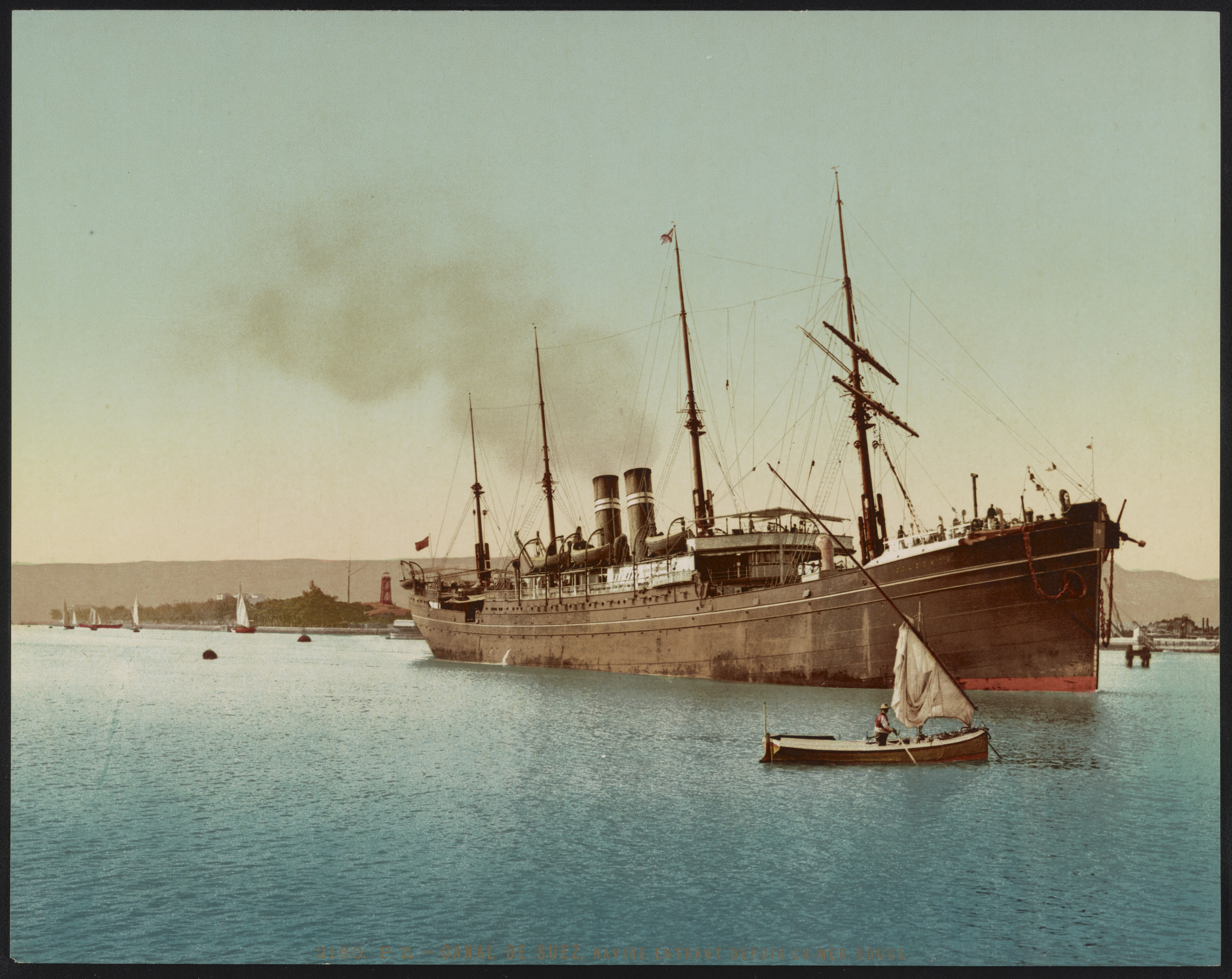
- Golconda entering the Suez Canal from the Red Sea

History

United Kingdom
- Name: Trans-Pacific (launched); Golconda (1888-1916)
- Owner: British India Steam Navigation Company
- Port of registry: Glasgow
- Builder: William Doxford & Sons, Sunderland, England
- Yard number: 166
- Launched: 8 February 1887
- Completed: 13 October 1888
- Identification: British Official Number 95098
- Fate: Sunk by mine 3 June 1916

General characteristics
- Tonnage: 5,874 GRT
- Length: 422 ft (129 m)
- Beam: 41.8 ft (12.7 m)
- Installed power: 4,360 BHP
- Sail plan: barquentine

== Construction and description ==
In the mid-1880s the Sunderland shipbuilders William Doxford & Sons expanded their yard at Pallion on the River Wear but then, suffering a dearth of orders, decided to commence building on speculation their largest vessel ever to demonstrate their capabilities. They chose a two-funnelled, four-masted steel passenger-cargo liner of about 5,600 GRT, which was laid down in 1886 with the provisional name Nulli Secunda ("Second to none"). For about a year the builders tried to find a buyer until, believing that she would be bought by Canadian Pacific Steamships for their new route between Vancouver, British Columbia and the Far East, they named her Trans-Pacific; she was launched by the Mayoress of Sunderland with that name on 8 February 1887, even though by then negotiations with Canadian Pacific had not been concluded. Some time after the launch, British India Steam Navigation Company (B.I.) became interested, to upgrade their London-Calcutta service. They required considerable alterations to meet their service, which were not finished until October 1888. Golconda was registered at Glasgow on 25 September 1888 and allocated British Official Number 95098 and signal letters K.V.C.G.

Completed as Golconda, she measured 6,037 GRT and 3,961 NRT, with registered length of 422.0 feet (128.6 m), a beam of 41.8 feet (12.7 m) and depth of 32.5 feet (9.9 m). She was powered by a single 550nhp/4360ihp triple-expansion steam engine, also made by Doxfords, that drove a single screw propeller, giving her a trial speed of 13.9 knots (16.0 mph; 25.7 km/h). The ship had cabin capacity for 80 1st-class and 28 2nd-class passengers, and could carry about 6000 tons of cargo.

== British India Line service ==
After preliminary loading in the Tyne and at Antwerp, Golconda sailed from London on 19 October 1888 on her maiden voyage to Calcutta. She had an inauspicious start, suffering engine damage after leaving London, putting in to Spithead to undertake repairs and not leaving there until 27 October. Thereafter she traded successfully on the Calcutta route for 12 years; her low passenger capacity for her size was popular with travellers and the accommodation was more spacious than was usual. She suffered only two minor casualties: a small fire in December 1890 and was rammed by the Liverpool iron barque Lathom two years later, both in the Hooghly River, but was only lightly damaged.

In 1900 Golconda was chartered as a troopship during the Boer War, sailing from London to Malta on 3 January 1900 with nearly 1000 troops of the Royal West Kent Regiment. Taken up again, in August 1902 she brought 500 Boer prisoners to Durban from Calcutta, and then carried 900 returning troops to Southampton. This was followed by 1000 Boer prisoners from St Helena to Simonstown and troops from Durban to Ceylon. Returning to her regular London-Calcutta service, Golconda was gradually outclassed by more modern vessels in the B.I. fleet and was transferred to the company's East African service.

== Indian Expeditionary Force transport ==
In October 1915 Golconda was again taken up as a transport, for the Indian Expeditionary Force. In addition, 600 German civilian internees from the camp in Ahmednagar were transported to London, from where they were repatriated via the Netherlands. A further group of 500 Germans were repatriated in a similar way in March 1916.

== Loss ==
Golconda struck a mine laid by German submarine UC 3, and sank in the North Sea on 3 June 1916, 5 nautical miles (9.3 km; 5.8 mi) south east by east of Aldeburgh, Suffolk (52°08′30″N 1°44′45″E) with the loss of nineteen lives. She was lost while on a voyage from Tees and London to Calcutta with general cargo.
