= SM U-33 (Germany) =

German Type U 31 U-boat

History

German Empire
- Name: U-33
- Ordered: 29 March 1912
- Builder: Germaniawerft, Kiel
- Yard number: 193
- Laid down: 7 November 1912
- Launched: 19 May 1914
- Commissioned: 27 September 1914
- Fate: Surrendered at the end of the war broken up at Blyth in 1919-20

General characteristics
- Class & type: Type U 31 submarine
- Displacement: 685 t (674 long tons) (surfaced); 878 t (864 long tons) (submerged)
- Length: 64.70 m (212 ft 3 in) (o/a); 52.36 m (171 ft 9 in) (pressure hull)
- Beam: 6.32 m (20 ft 9 in) (o/a); 4.05 m (13 ft 3 in) (pressure hull)
- Draught: 3.56 m (11 ft 8 in)
- Installed power: 2 × 1,850 PS (1,361 kW; 1,825 shp) diesel engines; 2 × 1,200 PS (883 kW; 1,184 shp) Doppelmodyn
- Propulsion: 2 × shafts; 2 × 1.60 m (5 ft 3 in) propellers
- Speed: 16.4 knots (30.4 km/h; 18.9 mph) (surfaced); 9.7 knots (18.0 km/h; 11.2 mph) (submerged)
- Range: 8,790 nmi (16,280 km; 10,120 mi) at 8 knots (15 km/h; 9.2 mph) (surfaced); 80 nmi (150 km; 92 mi) at 5 knots (9.3 km/h; 5.8 mph) (submerged)
- Test depth: 50 m (164 ft 1 in)
- Complement: 4 officers, 31 enlisted
- Armament: four 50 cm (20 in) torpedo tubes (2 each bow and stern); 6 torpedoes; one 8.8 cm (3.5 in) SK L/30 deck gun 10.5 cm (4.1 in) SK L/45 from 1916)

Service record
- Part of: IV Flotilla; Unknown start - 1 August 1915; Pola Flotilla; 16 September 1915 - 11 March 1916; Constantinople Flotilla; 11 March - 27 Nov 1916; Pola / Mittelmeer / Mittelmeer I Flotilla; 27 November 1916 - 11 November 1918
- Commanders: Konrad Gansser; 27 September 1914 – 31 March 1917; Gustav Sieß; 1 April 1917 – 11 November 1918
- Operations: 16 patrols
- Victories: 82 merchant ships sunk (188,331 GRT); 2 auxiliary warship sunk (5,800 GRT); 8 merchant ships damaged (36,452 GRT); 1 merchant ship taken as prize (453 GRT)

SM U-33 was a German Type U 31 U-boat of the Imperial German Navy.

== Design ==
Type U 31 submarines were double-hulled ocean-going craft similar to Type 23 and Type 27 boats in dimensions, differing only slightly in propulsion and speed. They were considered very good high sea boats with average manoeuvrability and good surface steering.

U-33 had an overall length of 64.70 m (212 ft 3 in), her pressure hull was 52.36 m (171 ft 9 in) long. The boat's beam was 6.32 m (20 ft 9 in) (o/a), while the pressure hull measured 4.05 m (13 ft 3 in). Type 31s had a draught of 3.56 m (11 ft 8 in) with a total height of 7.68–8.04 m (25 ft 2 in – 26 ft 5 in). The boats displaced a total of 971 tonnes (956 long tons); 685 t (674 long tons) when surfaced and 878 t (864 long tons) when submerged.

U-33 was fitted with two Germania 6-cylinder two-stroke diesel engines with a total of 1,850 metric horsepower (1,361 kW; 1,825 bhp) for use on the surface and two Siemens-Schuckert double-acting electric motors with a total of 1,200 PS (883 kW; 1,184 shp) for underwater use. These engines powered two shafts, each with a 1.60 m (5 ft 3 in) propeller, which gave the boat a top surface speed of 16.4 knots (30.4 km/h; 18.9 mph), and 9.7 knots (18.0 km/h; 11.2 mph) when submerged. Cruising range was 8,790 nautical miles (16,280 km; 10,120 mi) at 8 knots (15 km/h; 9.2 mph) on the surface, and 80 nmi (150 km; 92 mi) at 5 knots (9.3 km/h; 5.8 mph) under water. Diving depth was 50 m (164 ft 1 in).

The U-boat was armed with four 50 cm (20 in) torpedo tubes, two fitted in the bow and two in the stern, and carried six torpedoes. Additionally U-33 was equipped in 1915 with one 8.8 cm (3.5 in) Uk L/30 deck gun, which was later replaced with a 10.5 cm (4.1 in) gun. The boat's complement was four officers and 31 enlisted.

== Service history ==
=== SS Brussels ===
On 28 March 1915, U-33 ordered the Great Eastern Railway's SS Brussels to stop. Instead of doing so, her captain, Charles Fryatt, ordered full steam ahead and attempted to ram U-33, which only just managed to dive in time.

=== Sinking of hospital ship ===
On 30 March, 1916 the Russian hospital ship Portugal was towing a string of small flat-bottomed boats to ferry wounded from the shore to the ship. Off Rizeh, on the Turkish coast of the Black Sea she had stopped as one of the small boats was sinking and repairs were being made. The ship was not carrying wounded at the time, but had a staff of Red Cross workers on board, as well as her usual crew. | The ship's crew saw a periscope approaching the vessel but as the ship was a hospital ship and protected by the Hague conventions no evasive actions were taken. Without warning SM U-33 fired a torpedo which missed. The submarine came around again fired a torpedo from a depth of 30 feet, which hit near the engine room, breaking the ship into two pieces. Of 273 persons on board, 158 were rescued.

== Operations ==
SM U-33 Kptlt. Gausser until Autumn 1917, then to U-156; next C.O. probably Kptlt. Siess.

U-33 came off the stocks at Kiel about the end of November 1914, and joined the Kiel School for trials before proceeding to Emden on 12 January 1915. She was attached to the 4th Half Flotilla. 24–25 January 1915, it was on patrol in the Bight, an area where enemy battlecruisers were reported. On 30 January 1915, departed on "Special anti-submarine patrol" but returned owing to engine trouble.

Further patrols in Bight were made on 18–20 February and 21-22 February 1915l.

From 27 February – 10 April 1915 U-33 passed through the English Channel and into the Atlantic. 2 S.S., 2 sailing vessels sunk.

29–30 May 1915. North Sea returned owing to defective W/T.

4–24 June 1915. Northabout to west coast of Scotland. Sank 2 S.S., 1 prize.

14–17 August 1915. Bight Anti-air raid patrol.

28 August – 15 September 1915. To Mediterranean northabout. Sank 5 S.S.

Arrived Cattaro about 15 September and joined the Constantinople Half Flotilla.

28 September – 9 October 1915. Cruise in eastern Mediterranean. Sank 10 S.S.

16 November – 6 December 1915. Cruise in central Mediterranean. Sank 13 S.S. On 5 December was in action with drifter HOLLIBANK in the Straits of Otranto. Intercepted a neutral Greek ship between Piraeus and Messina and took as prisoner Stanley Wilson, a King's messenger.

April 1916 – November 1916. U-33 was operating chiefly in the eastern Black Sea and was based on Constantinople or Varna. By April 1917 she was back in the Adriatic.

12 January – 10 February 1918. Left Cattaro and operated in eastern Mediterranean. Sank 2. S.S., 2 sailing vessels, and damaged but did not sink 2 S.S.

1–17 May 1918. Left Cattaro for the east, and on 7 May was in area off Port Said. Sank 1 S.S., 1 sailing vessel, and attacked 2 ships and a convoy unsuccessfully. On May 8 was in action, and on 15 May broke off undertaking owing to defects.

2 September to about 26 September. Left Cattaro for the east. Sank 1 S.S., 12 sailing vessels.

On 19 October 1918. U-33 left Cattaro for Kiel en route attacked by a naval trawler on 1 November at about 36°35'E. She steered northabout and by the Sound, at some time with UB-51 and UB-105. At the end of the war, U-33 was surrendered to British at Harwich January 16, 1919.

== Summary of raiding history ==
Date	Name	Nationality	Tonnage (Note: Merchant ship tonnages are in gross register tons. Military vessels are listed by tons displacement.)	Fate
2 April 1915	Paquerette	France	399	Sunk
4 April 1915	Hermes	Russian Empire	1,019	Sunk
4 April 1915	Olivine	United Kingdom	634	Sunk
5 April 1915	Northlands	United Kingdom	2,776	Sunk
10 June 1915	Dania	Russian Empire	2,648	Sunk
14 June 1915	Davanger	Norway	2,256	Sunk
21 June 1915	Sigurd Hund	Norway	453	Captured as prize
1 September 1915	Whitefield	United Kingdom	2,422	Sunk
4 September 1915	Cymbeline	United Kingdom	4,505	Sunk
4 September 1915	Glimt	Norway	955	Sunk
4 September 1915	Mimosa	United Kingdom	3,466	Sunk
4 September 1915	Storesand	Norway	1,639	Sunk
6 September 1915	John Hardie	United Kingdom	4,372	Sunk
30 September 1915	Tobia	Kingdom of Italy	185	Sunk
1 October 1915	Provincia	France	3,523	Sunk
2 October 1915	Arabian	United Kingdom	2,744	Sunk
2 October 1915	Sainte Marguerite	France	3,908	Sunk
3 October 1915	Antonie	France	2,698	Sunk
4 October 1915	Craigston	United Kingdom	2,617	Sunk
4 October 1915	Yunnan	France	6,474	Damaged
5 October 1915	Burrsfield	United Kingdom	4,037	Sunk
5 October 1915	X130	United Kingdom	160	Sunk
6 October 1915	Dimitrios	Greece	2,508	Sunk
6 October 1915	Scawby	United Kingdom	3,658	Sunk
6 October 1915	Silverash	United Kingdom	3,753	Sunk
7 October 1915	Amiral Hamelin	France	5,051	Sunk
18 November 1915	Enosis	United Kingdom	3,409	Sunk
19 November 1915	Senju Maru	Japan	4,340	Sunk
20 November 1915	Merganser	United Kingdom	1,905	Sunk
23 November 1915	Tafna	France	1,444	Damaged
24 November 1915	Liguria	Kingdom of Italy	3,199	Sunk
25 November 1915	Algerien	France	1,767	Sunk
26 November 1915	Tringa	United Kingdom	2,154	Sunk
27 November 1915	Kingsway	United Kingdom	3,647	Sunk
27 November 1915	Omara	France	435	Sunk
27 November 1915	Tanis	United Kingdom	3,655	Sunk
29 November 1915	Malinche	United Kingdom	1,868	Sunk
29 November 1915	Zarifis	Greece	2,904	Sunk
30 November 1915	Colenso	United Kingdom	3,861	Sunk
30 November 1915	Langton Hall	United Kingdom	4,437	Sunk
1 December 1915	Clan Macleod	United Kingdom	4,796	Sunk
1 December 1915	Umeta	United Kingdom	5,312	Sunk
2 December 1915	Commodore	United Kingdom	5,858	Sunk
30 March 1916	Portugal	Imperial Russian Navy	5,358	Sunk
31 March 1916	Roi Albert	Belgium	2,853	Damaged
31 March 1916	Unidentified Sailing Vessel	Russian Empire	7	Sunk
3 April 1916	Enrichetta	Imperial Russian Navy	442	Sunk
28 April 1916	Lyusya	Russian Empire	50	Sunk
28 April 1916	Anzhelika	Russian Empire	170	Sunk
28 April 1916	Unidentified sailing vessel	Russian Empire	300	Sunk
18 September 1916	Unidentified Small Fishing Vessel (1 of 2)	Russian Empire	unknown	Sunk
18 September 1916	Unidentified Small Fishing Vessel (2 of 2)	Russian Empire	unknown	Sunk
15 April 1917	Cameronia	United Kingdom	10,963	Sunk
16 April 1917	Sontay	France	7,247	Sunk
22 April 1917	Blaatind	Norway	1,641	Sunk
22 April 1917	Maria S.	Kingdom of Italy	133	Sunk
22 April 1917	Unione	Kingdom of Italy	207	Sunk
26 April 1917	Monitor	United Kingdom	138	Sunk
27 April 1917	Mafalda	Kingdom of Italy	162	Sunk
27 April 1917	Margaret B. Rouss	United States	701	Sunk
28 April 1917	Lisetta	Kingdom of Italy	40	Sunk
30 April 1917	Chrisomalli Th. Sifneo	Greece	2,415	Sunk
27 May 1917	Beatrice	Kingdom of Italy	106	Sunk
27 May 1917	Michele Costantino	Kingdom of Italy	51	Sunk
3 June 1917	Greenbank	United Kingdom	3,881	Sunk
3 June 1917	Islandmore	United Kingdom	3,046	Sunk
7 June 1917	Il Dionisio	Kingdom of Italy	97	Sunk
7 June 1917	San Antonio	Kingdom of Italy	13	Sunk
26 July 1917	Blanchette	Kingdom of Italy	280	Sunk
26 July 1917	Gesu E Maria	Kingdom of Italy	196	Sunk
27 July 1917	Frigido	Kingdom of Italy	59	Sunk
27 July 1917	Genova	Kingdom of Italy	3,486	Sunk
28 July 1917	Splendor	Kingdom of Italy	6,507	Damaged
1 August 1917	Llandudno	United Kingdom	4,187	Sunk
4 August 1917	Angelina T.	Kingdom of Italy	146	Sunk
8 August 1917	Llanishen	United Kingdom	3,837	Sunk
9 August 1917	Flora	Kingdom of Italy	125	Sunk
9 August 1917	Industria	Spain	51	Sunk
15 August 1917	Bandai Maru	Japan	3,227	Sunk
23 January 1918	Capri	Kingdom of Italy	3,899	Damaged
24 January 1918	Antonios J. Dracoulis	Greece	3,301	Sunk
25 January 1918	Apostoles Andreas	United Kingdom	50	Sunk
29 January 1918	Taxiarchis	United Kingdom	160	Sunk
31 January 1918	Eggesford	United Kingdom	4,414	Damaged
1 February 1918	Glenamoy	United Kingdom	7,269	Damaged
4 February 1918	Ravenshoe	United Kingdom	3,592	Damaged
4 February 1918	Standish Hall	United Kingdom	3,996	Sunk
20 March 1918	Saint Dimitrios	United Kingdom	3,359	Sunk
20 March 1918	Samoset	United Kingdom	5,251	Sunk
20 March 1918	Yochow	United Kingdom	2,127	Sunk
20 March 1918	Antonios M. Theophilatos	Greece	2,282	Sunk
31 March 1918	La Loire	France	5,343	Sunk
5 May 1918	Aghios Johannis	Greece	20	Sunk

== See also ==
- Room 40

== Bibliography ==
- Gröner, Erich; Jung, Dieter; Maass, Martin (1991). U-boats and Mine Warfare Vessels. German Warships 1815–1945. Vol. 2. Translated by Thomas, Keith; Magowan, Rachel. London: Conway Maritime Press. ISBN 0-85177-593-4.
- Spindler, Arno (1966) [1932]. Der Handelskrieg mit U-Booten. 5 Vols. Berlin: Mittler & Sohn. Vols. 4+5, dealing with 1917+18, are very hard to find: Guildhall Library, London, has them all, also Vol. 1-3 in an English translation: The submarine war against commerce.
- Beesly, Patrick (1982). Room 40: British Naval Intelligence 1914-1918. London: H Hamilton. ISBN 978-0-241-10864-2.
- Halpern, Paul G. (1995). A Naval History of World War I. New York: Routledge. ISBN 978-1-85728-498-0.
- Roessler, Eberhard (1997). Die Unterseeboote der Kaiserlichen Marine. Bonn: Bernard & Graefe. ISBN 978-3-7637-5963-7.
- Schroeder, Joachim (2002). Die U-Boote des Kaisers. Bonn: Bernard & Graefe. ISBN 978-3-7637-6235-4.
- Koerver, Hans Joachim (2008). Room 40: German Naval Warfare 1914-1918. Vol I., The Fleet in Action. Steinbach: LIS Reinisch. ISBN 978-3-902433-76-3.
- Koerver, Hans Joachim (2009). Room 40: German Naval Warfare 1914-1918. Vol II., The Fleet in Being. Steinbach: LIS Reinisch. ISBN 978-3-902433-77-0.
