= SM UC-8 =

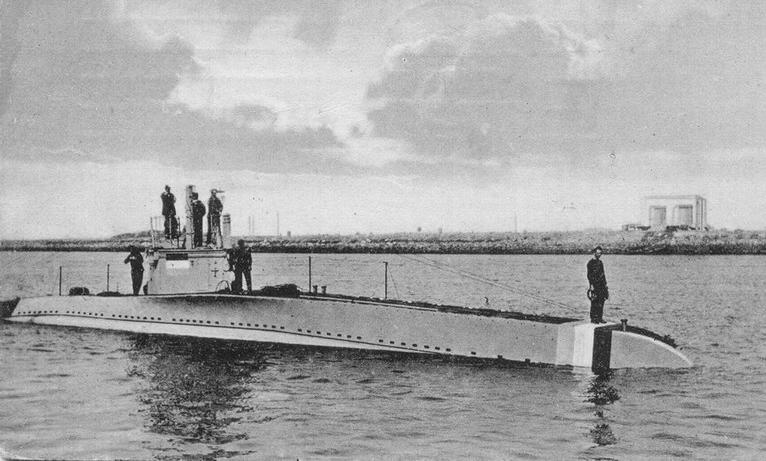
- The UC-8 in Dutch service as HNLMS M 1

History

German Empire
- Name: UC-8
- Ordered: November 1914
- Builder: AG Vulcan, Hamburg
- Yard number: 52
- Launched: 6 July 1915
- Commissioned: 5 July 1915
- Fate: Grounded on Dutch coast, 4 November 1915; interned

Netherlands
- Name: M 1
- Owner: Royal Netherlands Navy
- Acquired: 1917
- Commissioned: 13 March 1917
- Fate: Broken up in 1932

General characteristics
- Class & type: Type UC I submarine
- Displacement: 168 t (165 long tons), surfaced; 183 t (180 long tons), submerged
- Length: 33.99 m (111 ft 6 in) o/a; 29.62 m (97 ft 2 in) pressure hull
- Beam: 3.15 m (10 ft 4 in)
- Draft: 3.04 m (10 ft)
- Propulsion: 1 × propeller shaft; 1 × 6-cylinder, 4-stroke diesel engine, 90 PS (66 kW; 89 bhp); 1 × electric motor, 175 PS (129 kW; 173 shp)
- Speed: 6.20 knots (11.48 km/h; 7.13 mph), surfaced; 5.22 knots (9.67 km/h; 6.01 mph), submerged
- Range: 780 nmi (1,440 km; 900 mi) at 5 knots (9.3 km/h; 5.8 mph) surfaced; 50 nmi (93 km; 58 mi) at 4 knots (7.4 km/h; 4.6 mph) submerged
- Test depth: 50 m (160 ft)
- Complement: 14
- Armament: 6 × 100 cm (39 in) mine tubes; 12 × UC 120 mines; 1 × 7.92 mm (0.312 in) machine gun

Service record
- Part of: I Flotilla; Unknown – 4 November 1915
- Commanders: Oblt.z.S. Georg Haag; 5 July – 17 October 1915; Oblt.z.S. Walter Gottfried Schmidt; 18 October – 4 November 1915
- Operations: 1 patrol
- Victories: None

SM UC-8 was a German Type UC I minelayer submarine or U-boat in the German Imperial Navy (German: Kaiserliche Marine) during World War I. The U-boat had been ordered by November 1914 and was launched on 6 July 1915. She was commissioned into the German Imperial Navy on 5 July 1915 as SM UC-8. (Note: "SM" stands for "Seiner Majestät" (English: His Majesty's) and combined with the U for Unterseeboot would be translated as His Majesty's Submarine.) Mines laid by UC-8 in her one patrol are not known to have sunk any ships. UC-8 ran aground on the Dutch coast near Terschelling on 4 November 1915. Interned by the Dutch, UC-8 was purchased and commissioned into the Dutch Navy as HNLMS M 1. The submarine was broken up in 1932.

== Design ==
A Type UC I submarine, UC-8 had a displacement of 168 tonnes (165 long tons) when at the surface and 183 tonnes (180 long tons) while submerged. She had a length overall of 33.99 m (111 ft 6 in), a beam of 3.15 m (10 ft 4 in), and a draught of 3.04 m (10 ft). The submarine was powered by one Daimler-Motoren-Gesellschaft six-cylinder, four-stroke diesel engine producing 90 metric horsepower (66 kW; 89 shp), an electric motor producing 175 metric horsepower (129 kW; 173 shp), and one propeller shaft. She was capable of operating at a depth of 50 metres (160 ft).

The submarine had a maximum surface speed of 6.20 knots (11.48 km/h; 7.13 mph) and a maximum submerged speed of 5.22 knots (9.67 km/h; 6.01 mph). When submerged, she could operate for 50 nautical miles (93 km; 58 mi) at 4 knots (7.4 km/h; 4.6 mph); when surfaced, she could travel 780 nautical miles (1,440 km; 900 mi) at 5 knots (9.3 km/h; 5.8 mph). UC-8 was fitted with six 100 centimetres (39 in) mine tubes, twelve UC 120 mines, and one 8 millimetres (0.31 in) machine gun. She was built by AG Vulcan Stettin and her complement was fourteen crew members.

== Bibliography ==
- Bendert, Harald (2001). Die UC-Boote der Kaiserlichen Marine 1914-1918. Minenkrieg mit U-Booten (in German). Hamburg, Berlin, Bonn: Mittler. ISBN 3-8132-0758-7.
- Gröner, Erich; Jung, Dieter; Maass, Martin (1991). U-boats and Mine Warfare Vessels. German Warships 1815–1945. Vol. 2. Translated by Thomas, Keith; Magowan, Rachel. London: Conway Maritime Press. ISBN 0-85177-593-4.
- Gardiner, Robert; Gray, Randal, eds. (1985). Conway's All the World's Fighting Ships 1906–1921. Annapolis, Maryland: Naval Institute Press. ISBN 978-0-87021-907-8. OCLC 12119866.
- Tarrant, V. E. (1989). The U-Boat Offensive: 1914–1945. Annapolis, Maryland: Naval Institute Press. ISBN 978-0-87021-764-7. OCLC 20338385.
- Roetering, B., ed. (1997). Mijnendienst 1907-1997 90 jaar: feiten, verhalen en anekdotes uit het negentigjarig bestaan van de Mijnendienst van de Koninklijke Marine (in Dutch). Roetering. ISBN 90-90-10528-X.
- Jalhay, P.C. (1982). Nederlandse Onderzeedienst 75 jaar (in Dutch). Bussum: De Boer Maritiem. ISBN 90-228-1864-0.
