= PDCD4 =

Protein-coding gene in the species Homo sapiens

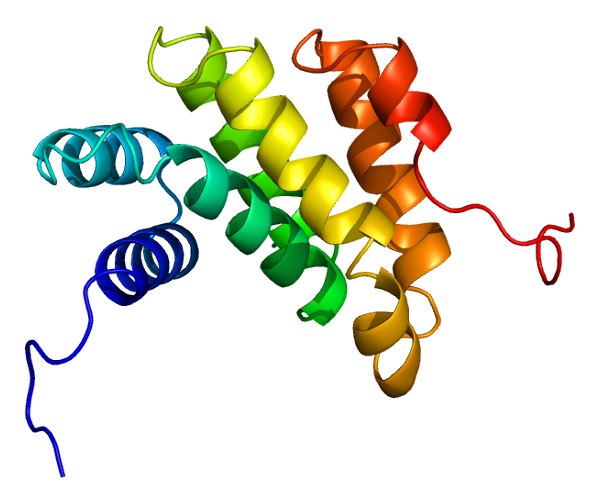
Available structures
PDB	Ortholog search: PDBe RCSB
PDB	List of PDB id codes 2KZT, 2GGF, 2RG8, 2ZU6, 3EIJ

Identifiers
- Aliases: PDCD4, H731, programmed cell death 4 (neoplastic transformation inhibitor), programmed cell death 4
- External IDs: OMIM: 608610; MGI: 107490; HomoloGene: 7879; GeneCards: PDCD4; OMA:PDCD4 - orthologs

Gene location (Human)
Chr.	Chromosome 10 (human)
Band	10q25.2	Start	110,871,795 bp
Band	10q25.2	End	110,900,006 bp

Gene location (Mouse)
Chr.	Chromosome 19 (mouse)
Band	19 D2|19 48.73 cM	Start	53,880,662 bp
Band	19 D2|19 48.73 cM	End	53,918,291 bp
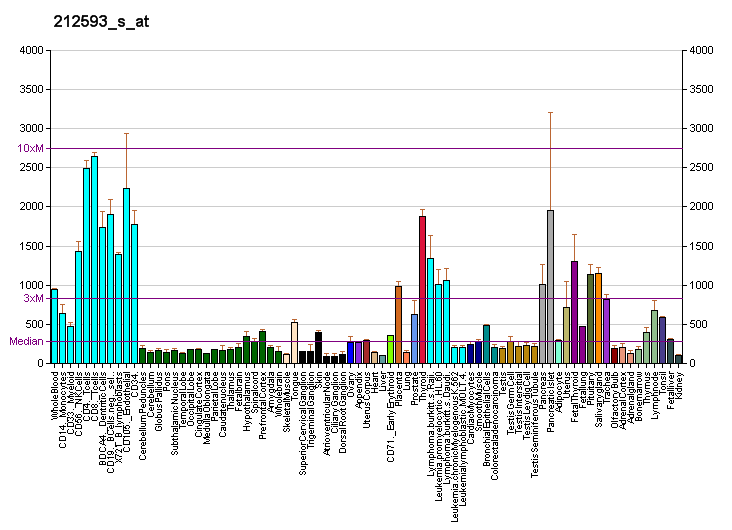

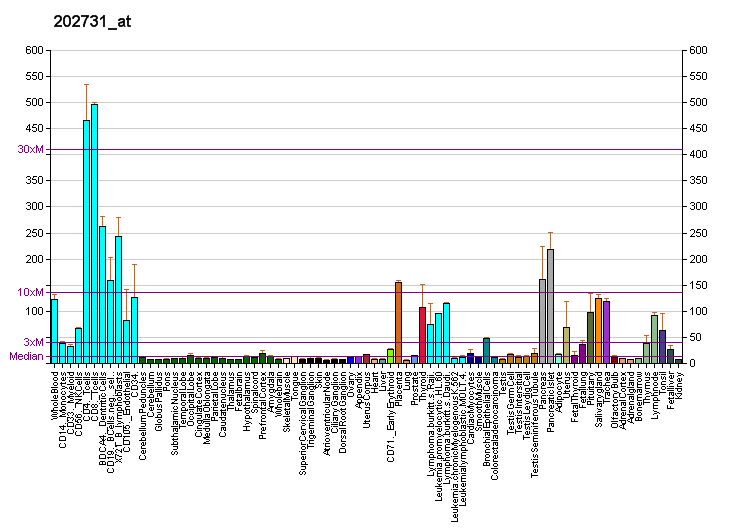

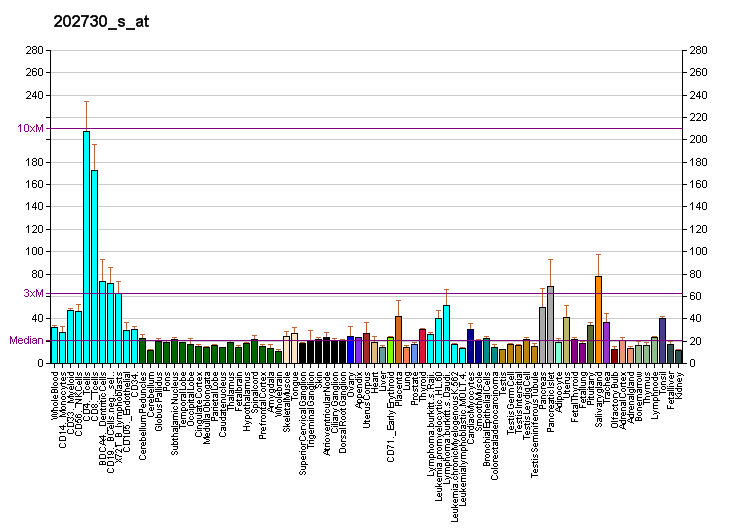
RNA expression pattern
Bgee	Human / Mouse (ortholog); Top expressed in: body of pancreas; skin of abdomen; skin of leg; rectum; right lobe of thyroid gland; left lobe of thyroid gland; minor salivary glands; left ovary; ventricular zone; right ovary / Top expressed in: lacrimal gland; submandibular gland; parotid gland; lobe of prostate; pyloric antrum; aortic valve; ascending aorta; Ileal epithelium; pineal gland; corneal stroma; More reference expression data
BioGPS	More reference expression data
Gene ontology
Molecular function	protein binding; RNA binding
Cellular component	cytoplasm; nucleus; cytosol; nucleoplasm
Biological process	regulation of protein metabolic process; negative regulation of cell cycle; negative regulation of apoptotic process; negative regulation of transcription, DNA-templated; negative regulation of JUN kinase activity; positive regulation of smooth muscle cell apoptotic process; negative regulation of myofibroblast differentiation; apoptotic process; positive regulation of endothelial cell apoptotic process; BMP signaling pathway; epithelial to mesenchymal transition involved in cardiac fibroblast development; negative regulation of vascular associated smooth muscle cell differentiation; positive regulation of inflammatory response; cellular response to lipopolysaccharide; negative regulation of cytokine production involved in inflammatory response; positive regulation of NIK/NF-kappaB signaling; interleukin-12-mediated signaling pathway; negative regulation of vascular associated smooth muscle cell proliferation; positive regulation of vascular associated smooth muscle cell apoptotic process
Sources:Amigo / QuickGO
Orthologs
Species	Human	Mouse
Entrez	27250	18569
Ensembl	ENSG00000150593	ENSMUSG00000024975
UniProt	Q53EL6	Q61823
RefSeq (mRNA)	NM_145341; NM_001199492; NM_014456	NM_001168491; NM_001168492; NM_011050
RefSeq (protein)	NP_001186421; NP_055271; NP_663314	NP_001161963; NP_001161964; NP_035180
Location (UCSC)	Chr 10: 110.87 – 110.9 Mb	Chr 19: 53.88 – 53.92 Mb
PubMed search
- Wikidata
View/Edit Human	View/Edit Mouse

Programmed cell death protein 4 is a protein that in humans is encoded by the PDCD4 gene. It is one of the targets of an oncomiR, MIRN21.

== Function ==
This gene encodes a protein localized to the nucleus in proliferating cells. Expression of this gene is modulated by cytokines in natural killer and T cells. The gene product is thought to play a role in apoptosis but the specific role has not yet been determined. Two transcripts encoding different isoforms have been identified.

== Interactions ==
PDCD4 has been shown to interact with RPS13, ribosomal protein L5, p62, LC3 and Ubiquitin [9]
