= SM UC-2 =

Coordinates: 52°28′N 1°48′E

History

German Empire
- Name: UC-2
- Ordered: November 1914
- Builder: AG Vulcan, Hamburg
- Yard number: 46
- Launched: 12 May 1915
- Commissioned: 17 May 1915
- Fate: Sunk by own mine, 30 June 1915

General characteristics
- Class & type: Type UC I submarine
- Displacement: 168 t (165 long tons), surfaced; 183 t (180 long tons), submerged
- Length: 33.99 m (111 ft 6 in) o/a; 29.62 m (97 ft 2 in) pressure hull
- Beam: 3.15 m (10 ft 4 in)
- Draft: 3.04 m (10 ft)
- Propulsion: 1 × propeller shaft; 1 × 6-cylinder, 4-stroke diesel engine, 90 PS (66 kW; 89 bhp); 1 × electric motor, 175 PS (129 kW; 173 shp)
- Speed: 6.20 knots (11.48 km/h; 7.13 mph), surfaced; 5.22 knots (9.67 km/h; 6.01 mph), submerged
- Range: 780 nmi (1,440 km; 900 mi) at 5 knots (9.3 km/h; 5.8 mph) surfaced; 50 nmi (93 km; 58 mi) at 4 knots (7.4 km/h; 4.6 mph) submerged
- Test depth: 50 m (160 ft)
- Complement: 14
- Armament: 6 × 100 cm (39 in) mine tubes; 12 × UC 120 mines; 1 × 8 mm (0.31 in) machine gun

Service record
- Part of: Flandern Flotilla; 25–30 June 1915
- Commanders: Oblt.z.S. Karl Mey; 17 May – 30 June 1915
- Operations: 2 patrols
- Victories: None

SM UC-2 was a German Type UC I minelayer submarine or U-boat in the German Imperial Navy (German: Kaiserliche Marine) during World War I. The U-boat had been ordered by November 1914 and was launched on 12 May 1915. She was commissioned into the German Imperial Navy on 17 May 1915 as SM UC-2. (Note: "SM" stands for "Seiner Majestät" (English: His Majesty's) and combined with the U for Unterseeboot would be translated as His Majesty's Submarine.) Mines laid by UC-2 in her two patrols were not credited with sinking any ships.

== Design ==
A Type UC I submarine, UC-2 had a displacement of 168 tonnes (165 long tons) when at the surface and 183 tonnes (180 long tons) while submerged. She had a length overall of 33.99 m (111 ft 6 in), a beam of 3.15 m (10 ft 4 in), and a draught of 3.04 m (10 ft). The submarine was powered by one Daimler-Motoren-Gesellschaft six-cylinder, four-stroke diesel engine producing 90 metric horsepower (66 kW; 89 shp), an electric motor producing 175 metric horsepower (129 kW; 173 shp), and one propeller shaft. She was capable of operating at a depth of 50 metres (160 ft).

The submarine had a maximum surface speed of 6.20 knots (11.48 km/h; 7.13 mph) and a maximum submerged speed of 5.22 knots (9.67 km/h; 6.01 mph). When submerged, she could operate for 50 nautical miles (93 km; 58 mi) at 4 knots (7.4 km/h; 4.6 mph); when surfaced, she could travel 780 nautical miles (1,440 km; 900 mi) at 5 knots (9.3 km/h; 5.8 mph). UC-2 was fitted with six 100 centimetres (39 in) mine tubes, twelve UC 120 mines, and one 8 millimetres (0.31 in) machine gun. She was built by AG Vulcan Stettin and her complement was fourteen crew members.

== Fate ==
UC-2 sailed from Zeebrugge on 29 June 1915 to lay mines off Lowestoft. On 2 July she was accidentally run down by the coaster Cottingham off that same port; the impact tore a 3-foot (0.91 m) opening in the forward part of the pressure hull, and the submarine sank. The Cottingham's master reported the incident and the area was subsequently dragged by Royal Navy vessels, whose lines fouled an underwater obstruction and caused a substantial submerged explosion. On 3 July a diver discovered UC-2 in 8 fathoms (48 ft; 15 m); as well as the damage which had resulted from the impact with the Cottingham, he reported that one of the submarine's mines had been detonated by the drag lines.
