= German submarine U-14 =

U-14 may refer to one of the following German submarines:

- SM U-14 (Germany), was a Type U 13 submarine launched in 1911 and that served in the First World War until sunk on 5 June 1915
  - During the First World War, Germany also had these submarines with similar names:
    - SM UB-14, a Type UB I submarine launched in 1915 and surrendered in November 1918
    - SM UC-14, a Type UC I submarine launched in 1915 and sunk on 3 October 1917; while in Austro-Hungarian service in 1915, she was renamed U-18
- German submarine U-14 (1935), a Type IIB submarine that served in the Second World War and was scuttled on 2 May 1945
- German submarine U-14 (S193), a Type 206 submarine of the Bundesmarine that was launched in 1973 and scrapped in 1997
