= 9U =

9U or 9-U may refer to:

== Transportation ==
- Air Moldova (former IATA code: 9U), a former airline
- Yak-9U, a model of Yakovlev Yak-9
- Su-9U, a designation of Sukhoi Su-9
- 9U, a type of Volkswagen Caddy
- Burundi (aircraft registration code: 9U)

== Computing ==
- 9U, one of the possible sizes of a rack unit
- HP 9U, a Windows 3.0 version of the Windows-1252 codepage by Hewlett-Packard printers

== See also ==
- U9 (disambiguation)
