= Leathercoat Point =

Landform in Kent, England

Coordinates: 51.1566°N 1.3941°E

Leathercoat Point is a landform in St Margaret's at Cliffe, Kent. The Dover Patrol Monument is located here.
