= SS Ville de la Ciotat (1892) =

French passenger ship (1892–1915)

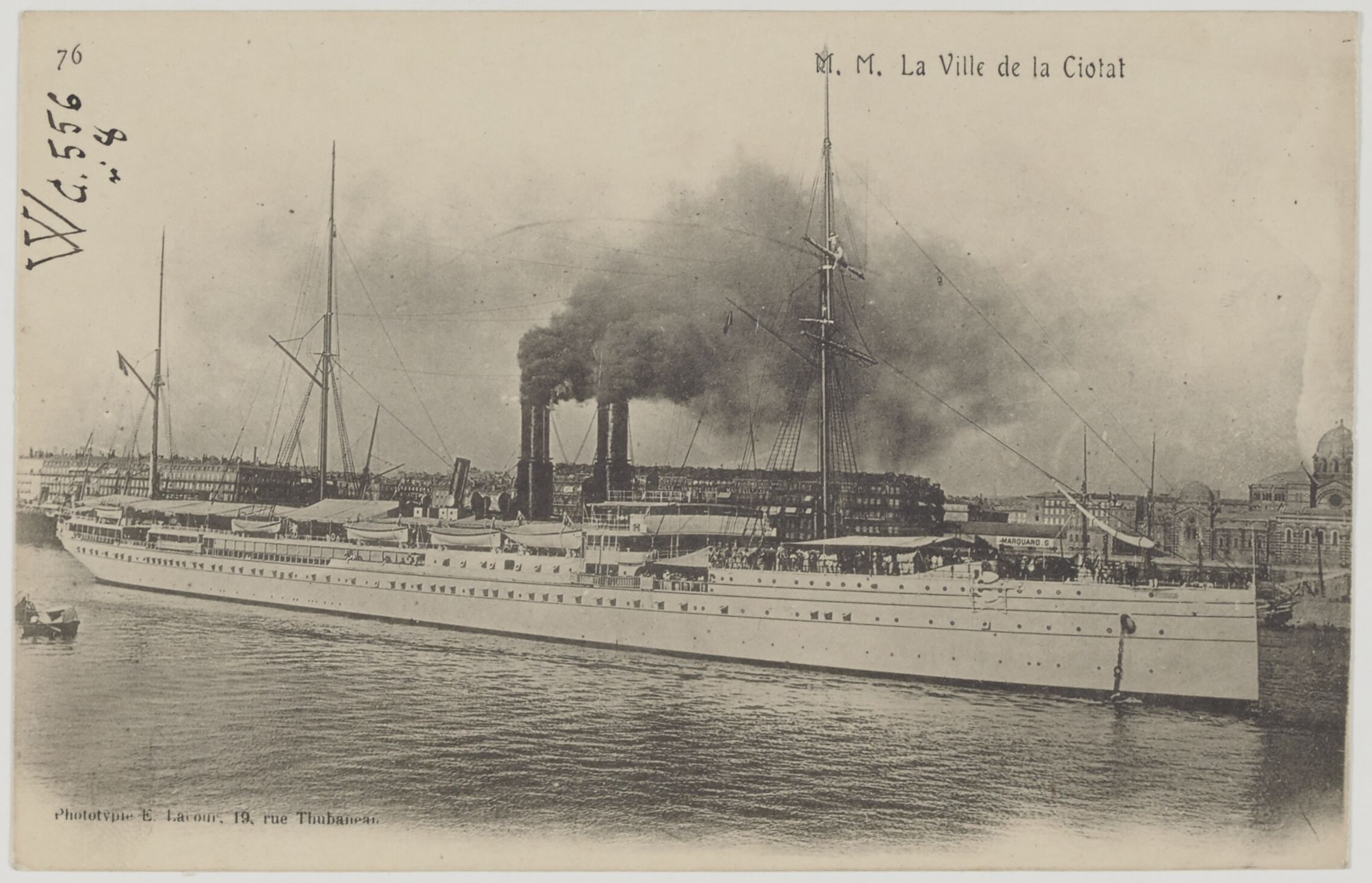

History

France
- Name: (France) Ville de la Ciotat
- Namesake: La Ciotat
- Owner: Messageries Maritimes
- Port of registry: France, Paris
- Builder: Messageries Maritimes, La Ciotat
- Yard number: 101
- Launched: 10 April 1892
- Completed: December 1892
- Acquired: December 1892
- Maiden voyage: 3 December 1892
- In service: 3 December 1892
- Out of service: 24 December 1915
- Identification: Official number: 5600457
- Fate: Torpedoed and sunk on 24 December 1915

General characteristics
- Type: Passenger ship
- Tonnage: 6,659 GRT
- Length: 152.5 m (500 ft 4 in)
- Beam: 15.1 m (49 ft 6 in)
- Depth: 10.4 m (34 ft 1 in)
- Installed power: One triple expansion steam engine
- Propulsion: 1 screw propeller
- Speed: 17.5 knots (32.4 km/h; 20.1 mph)
- Capacity: 591 passengers
- Notes: 3 masts and 2 funnels

SS Ville de la Ciotat was a French passenger ship that was torpedoed and sunk by the German submarine SM U-34 105 nautical miles (194 km) south west of Cape Matapan, Greece in the Mediterranean Sea on 24 December 1915 with the loss of 81 lives, while she was travelling from Shanghai, China to Marseille, France.

== Construction ==
Ville de la Ciotat was laid down as Mauricien at the Messageries Maritimes shipyard in La Ciotat, France in 1892, but was renamed before her launch on 10 April 1892, and was completed in December that same year. The ship was 152.5 metres (500 ft 4 in) long, had a beam of 15.1 metres (49 ft 6 in) and a depth of 10.4 metres (34 ft 1 in). She was assessed at 6,659 gross register tons (GRT) and had one triple expansion steam engine producing 7,500 nhp, driving a single screw propeller. The ship could reach a maximum speed of 17.5 knots (32.4 km/h; 20.1 mph) and possessed three masts and two funnels. As built, she had the capacity to carry 591 passengers of which 172 in First class, 71 in Second class and 348 in steerage. Ville de la Ciotat had three sister ships: Polynesien, Australien and Armand Behic.

== Career and loss ==
Ville de la Ciotat entered service on 3 December 1892 and was assigned to the Australian route until 1903 before serving the Far East routes from 1903 and 1912, during which she alternated that route with her original Australian route. Ville de la Ciotat served the Levant route from 1912 until the outbreak of World War I. She was one of the last Company ships to be able to sail from the Black Sea through the Strait of Bosphorus to the Mediterranean Sea before its closure on 9 September 1914. The ship continued her service on the Far East route and was making her way back to Marseille, France from Shanghai, China under the command of Captain Jules Levêque, while she was carrying a cargo of medicine and clothing for Italian soldiers, alongside 181 crew and 135 passengers in December 1915. While Ville de la Ciotat was sailing in the Mediterranean near Crete, Greece on Christmas Eve 1915, she was spotted by the German submarine SM U-34 who fired a torpedo at the ship without warning around 10 am. The torpedo hit the ship's stern on the port side and Captain Levêque ordered the engines stopped and a distress call to be send out. He thereafter ordered an evacuation of all passengers and crew that had survived the explosion and most of them made it into the lifeboats and four rafts despite the bad port list that Ville de la Ciotat had developed. Several lifeboats broke apart or capsized as the ship had maintained her momentum despite the stopped engines and rapid flooding of the ship. Captain Levêque left the ship on the last lifeboat as the water reached the aft promenade deck and by the time the lifeboat had rowed only a few meters from the ship, she started her final plunge as her stern sank rapidly and her bow rose high into the air. A column of fire was witnessed shooting out from the ship's funnels, spreading ash across a large area, before the ship disappeared under the waves at 10.30 am. Lifeboat No. 2, carrying seven people, was dragged down with the ship as the boat's tackle failed to release. SM U-34 surfaced following the ship's foundering and a crewman from Ville de la Ciotat made it onto the submarine, after which the German submarine crew questioned the man about the ship they'd just sunk before the man was placed on a raft and told by the Germans that an English steamer was coming to rescue the survivors before the submarine dived out of sight. Several hours after the loss of Ville de la Ciotat, the British steamer Moroe arrived on site and searched the wrecksite for an hour and a half, rescuing a total of 208 survivors and recovering two lifeboats and all rafts from Ville de la Ciotat before returning to Malta. The remaining survivors were rescued by other vessels and also landed at Malta. The sinking ended up taking the lives of 35 passengers and 46 crew who either died in the initial torpedo strike or drowned in the rapid sinking of the ship. The rescued crew and passengers were brought to Marseille aboard SS Crispin on 1 January 1916 and Captain F. Bates of the rescue vessel Moroe was awarded a gold medal and diploma by the French Government, through the Marine Department of the Board of Trade in Liverpool on 30 May 1916 in recognition of his heroic actions in the rescue of the survivors from Ville de la Ciotat.

== Wreck ==
The wreck of Ville de la Ciotat lies at (35°10′N 21°26′E). The current condition of the wreck is unknown.
