= List of shipwrecks in October 1915 =

The list of shipwrecks in October 1915 includes ships sunk, foundered, grounded, or otherwise lost during October 1915.

== 1 October ==
List of shipwrecks: 1 October 1915
Ship	State	Description
Elizabeth	Norway	The coaster suffered an onboard explosion and fire and sank in the English Channel off Cap la Heve, Seine-Inférieure, France.
Lackawanna	United States	The cargo ship ran aground in Lake Michigan and was severely damaged.
Pine Brance	Norway	The cargo ship collided with Fame (Norway) at Arkhangelsk, Russia and was a total loss.
Providencia	France	World War I: The troopship was sunk in the Mediterranean Sea 50 nautical miles (93 km) south of Cape Matapan, Greece (35°33′N 20°56′E) by SM U-33 (Imperial German Navy). Her 40 crew were rescued by Mossoul (France).

== 2 October ==
List of shipwrecks: 2 October 1915
Ship	State	Description
HMT Alexandra or Alexandra II	Royal Navy	The naval tug was lost on this date.
Arabian	United Kingdom	World War I: The cargo ship was shelled and sunk in the Mediterranean Sea 15 nautical miles (28 km) west of Cerigo, Greece (36°04′N 22°53′E by SM U-33 (Imperial German Navy). Her crew survived.
Sailor Prince	United Kingdom	World War I: The cargo ship was shelled and sunk in the Mediterranean Sea 56 nautical miles (104 km) south east by south of Cape Sidero, Crete, Greece (34°36′N 27°04′E) by SM U-39 (Imperial German Navy) with the loss of two crew.
Sainte Marguerite	France	World War I: The cargo ship was sunk in the Mediterranean Sea 20 nautical miles (37 km) south west of Cerigo by SM U-33 (Imperial German Navy). Her crew were rescued by Mossoul (France).

== 3 October ==
List of shipwrecks: 3 October 1915
Ship	State	Description
Antonie	France	World War I: The cargo ship was sunk in the Cerigo Strait (35°58′N 21°53′E) by SM U-33 (Imperial German Navy). Her crew survived.
Budrie	British India	World War I: The cargo ship was sunk as a blockship at Scapa Flow, Orkney Islands.
Iki	Imperial Japanese Navy	The coast defense and training ship was sunk as a gunnery target by the battlecruisers Kongō and Hiei (both Imperial Japanese Navy).

== 4 October ==
List of shipwrecks: 4 October 1915
Ship	State	Description
Brownstone	United States	The schooner sank near New Haven, Connecticut.
Craigston	United Kingdom	World War I: The collier was shelled and sunk in the Mediterranean Sea 35 nautical miles (65 km) west of Ovo Island, Greece (36°07′N 22°30′E) by SM U-33 (Imperial German Navy). Her crew survived.
Yunnan	France	World War I: The passenger ship was torpedoed and damaged in the Mediterranean Sea 21 nautical miles (39 km) south of Cape Matapan Greece by SM U-33 (Imperial German Navy) with the loss of a crew member. She was beached. Survivors were rescued by Mossoul (France). Yunnan was salvaged in 1919, repaired and returned to service as Ionopolis under the Greek flag.

== 5 October ==
List of shipwrecks: 5 October 1915
Ship	State	Description
Alose	French Navy	World War I: The naval trawler struck a mine and sank in the North Sea off the Galloper Lightship (United Kingdom) with the loss of twelve of her crew.
Burrsfield	United Kingdom	World War I: The collier was shelled and sunk in the Mediterranean Sea 70 nautical miles (130 km) off Cape Matapan, Greece (35°57′N 21°00′E) by SM U-33 (Imperial German Navy) with the loss of four crew.
Novocastrian	United Kingdom	World War I: The cargo ship struck a mine and sank in the North Sea 3.5 nautical miles (6.5 km) south east by east of Lowestoft, Suffolk. Her crew survived.
X 130	Royal Navy	World War I: The barge, under tow of Burrsfield (United Kingdom), was shelled and sunk 70 nautical miles (130 km) west of Cape Matapan (35°57′N 21°00′E) by SM U-33 (Imperial German Navy).

== 6 October ==
List of shipwrecks: 6 October 1915
Ship	State	Description
SMS Bahrenfeld	Imperial German Navy	The Vorpostenboot was lost on this date.
HMS Brighton Queen	Royal Navy	World War I: The auxiliary minesweeper struck a mine and sank in the English Channel 5 nautical miles (9.3 km) west of Nieuwpoort, West Flanders, Belgium with the loss of eight of her crew.
Dimitrios Dandiolos	Greece	World War I: The cargo ship was sunk in the Mediterranean Sea east of Malta (35°43′N 18°24′E) by SM U-33 (Imperial German Navy).
Forth	Norway	The cargo ship foundered in the Atlantic Ocean. Her crew were rescued by General Laurie (United States).
Islam	United States	While hauled out on the beach in Golovnin Bay at the mouth of the Niukluk River on the coast of the Territory of Alaska with no one aboard, the 11-gross register ton steamer was destroyed during a storm when large waves struck her and broke her up.
Novocastrian	United Kingdom	The cargo ship foundered. Her crew survived.
Scawby	United Kingdom	World War I: The cargo ship was scuttled in the Mediterranean Sea 220 nautical miles (410 km) east of Malta by SM U-33 (Imperial German Navy). Her crew survived.
Silverash	United Kingdom	World War I: The cargo ship was shelled and sunk in the Mediterranean Sea 184 nautical miles (341 km) east of Malta by SM U-33 (Imperial German Navy). Her crew survived.
Texelstroom	Netherlands	World War I: The cargo ship struck a mine and sank in the North Sea 1 nautical mile (1.9 km) west of the Shipwash Lightship (United Kingdom). Her crew survived.

== 7 October ==
List of shipwrecks: 7 October 1915
Ship	State	Description
Amiral Hamelin	France	World War I: The cargo ship was sunk in the Mediterranean Sea 170 nautical miles (310 km) west of Cape Matapan, Greece (35°37′N 19°08′E) by SM U-33 (Imperial German Navy) with the loss of 71 lives.
Halizones	United Kingdom	World War I: The cargo ship was shelled and sunk in the Mediterranean Sea 122 nautical miles (226 km) south east by east of Cape Martello, Crete, Greece by SM U-39 (Imperial German Navy). Her crew survived.
Katja	Russia	World War I: The coaster was sunk in the Black Sea 15 nautical miles (28 km) north west of Sevastopol by SM UB-14 (Imperial German Navy).
SMS T43	Imperial German Navy	World War I: The S7-class torpedo boat struck a mine and sank in the North Sea with the loss of three of her crew.

== 8 October ==
List of shipwrecks: 8 October 1915
Ship	State	Description
Apscheron	Imperial Russian Navy	World War I: The transport ship was torpedoed and sunk in the Black Sea 24 nmi (44 km) south of Cape Chersones by SM UB-14 (Imperial German Navy).
Thorpwood	United Kingdom	World War I: The collier was shelled and sunk in the Mediterranean Sea 122 nautical miles (226 km) south of Cape Martello, Crete, Greece (33°12′N 25°28′E) by SM U-39 (Imperial German Navy). Her crew survived.
Tyconda	United States	The 186-gross register ton, 104.3-foot (31.8 m) sternwheel passenger paddle steamer was destroyed by fire at Anchorage, Territory of Alaska. All ten people on board survived.

== 9 October ==
List of shipwrecks: 9 October 1915
Ship	State	Description
SMS A. Upmeyer	Imperial German Navy	The Vorpostenboot was lost on this date.
HMS Apollo	Royal Navy	World War I: The collier was shelled and sunk in the Mediterranean Sea 63 nautical miles (117 km) south of Gavdos, Greece (33°44′N 24°40′E) by SM U-39 (Imperial German Navy). Her crew survived.

== 10 October ==
List of shipwrecks: 10 October 1915
Ship	State	Description
Newcastle	United Kingdom	World War I: The cargo ship struck a mine and sank in the English Channel 4 nautical miles (7.4 km) south west of Folkestone, Kent. Her crew survived.
Washington	United States	While under tow in rough seas by the tug Pioneer (United States) from Port Townsend, Washington, to Cordova, Territory of Alaska, with a cargo of 100,000 board feet (236 cubic meters) of lumber, a crew of six, and a stowaway aboard, the 708-ton, 180-foot (55 m) sloop barge became waterlogged, ran aground on the west side of Kayak Island in the Alexander Archipelago two nautical miles (3.7 km) north of Cape Saint Elias, and broke up, becoming a total loss. All seven people on board survived.
Wrestler	United Kingdom	The flat (formerly a paddle tug) was sank in collision on this date, or 11 October.

== 11 October ==
List of shipwrecks: 11 October 1915
Ship	State	Description
Germania	Germany	The cargo ship ran aground off the coast of Sweden and was subsequently sunk by an onboard explosion.
Seileren	Norway	The four-masted barque collided with another vessel in the Irish Sea off Torr Head, County Antrim, United Kingdom. Her crew were rescued.
Thorpwood	United Kingdom	The cargo ship foundered. Her crew were rescued.

== 12 October ==
List of shipwrecks: 12 October 1915
Ship	State	Description
Combe	United Kingdom	The ammunition carrier was lost in the Arctic Sea on this date.
HMT Frons Olivae	Royal Navy	World War I: The naval trawler struck a mine and sank in the North Sea with the loss of eleven of her crew.
Lighter #6	United States	The lighter capsized and sank at Westport, Connecticut.
HMT Restore	Royal Navy	World War I: The naval trawler was shelled and sunk in the Straits of Otranto (40°20′N 18°42′E) by SM U-39 (Imperial German Navy) with the loss of two crew.

== 14 October ==
List of shipwrecks: 14 October 1915
Ship	State	Description
Salerno	United Kingdom	World War I: The cargo ship struck a mine and sank in the North Sea 2.5 nautical miles (4.6 km) south of the Longsand Lightship (United Kingdom) (51°45′N 1°42′E). Her crew survived.

== 15 October ==
List of shipwrecks: 15 October 1915
Ship	State	Description
SMS T100	Imperial German Navy	The training ship, a former S90-class torpedo boat, collided with Preussen (Germany) and sank in the Baltic Sea.
No. 2	Imperial Russian Navy	The crewless submarine foundered off the Sosnovets Lighthouse in Svyatanos Bay, in the White Sea whilst being towed to Murmansk. Attempts to refloat her were abandoned a year later and she was declared a total loss.

== 16 October ==
List of shipwrecks: 16 October 1915
Ship	State	Description
Volscian	United Kingdom	World War I: The coaster struck a mine and was damaged in the English Channel 2.5 nautical miles (4.6 km) west by south of Folkestone, Kent. She was beached but was later refloated.

== 17 October ==
List of shipwrecks: 17 October 1915
Ship	State	Description
HMT Javelin	Royal Navy	World War I: The naval trawler struck a mine and sank in the North Sea 3 nautical miles (5.6 km) south of the Longsand Lightship (United Kingdom) with the loss of a crew member.

== 18 October ==
List of shipwrecks: 18 October 1915
Ship	State	Description
Aleppo	United Kingdom	World War I: The cargo ship struck a mine and was damaged in the North Sea. She was beached but was later refloated.
Algardi	United Kingdom	The cargo ship ran aground on the Longsand, in the Thames Estuary, and was abandoned by her crew. She was refloated on 22 October.
Pernambuco	Germany	World War I: The cargo ship was torpedoed and sunk in the Baltic Sea off Oxelösund, Södermanland County, Sweden by a Royal Navy submarine.
Salerno	Norway	World War I: The cargo ship struck a mine and sank in the North Sea. Her crew survived.
Scilla	Italy	World War I: The cargo ship was sunk in the Aegean Sea off the Sporades, Greece by SM U-35 (Imperial German Navy).

== 19 October ==
List of shipwrecks: 19 October 1915
Ship	State	Description
HMT Erin II	Royal Navy	World War I: The naval trawler struck a mine and sank in the English Channel off the Nab Lightship (United Kingdom) with the loss of seven of her crew.

== 20 October ==
List of shipwrecks: 20 October 1915
Ship	State	Description
HMT Star Of Buchan	Royal Navy	World War I: The naval trawler struck a mine and sank in the English Channel off the Nab Lightship (United Kingdom) with the loss of seven of her crew.

== 21 October ==
List of shipwrecks: 21 October 1915
Ship	State	Description
Cape Antibes	United Kingdom	World War I: The collier struck a mine and sank in the White Sea with the loss of six of her crew.
Monitoria	United Kingdom	World War I: The collier struck a mine and sank in the North Sea (51°47′N 1°31′E). Her crew survived.
Roi Leopold	Belgium	The cargo ship was wrecked on the Macau Bank off Gironde, France. She was raised c.1921, repaired and returned to service.

== 22 October ==
List of shipwrecks: 22 October 1915
Ship	State	Description
Cissie	Norway	The barque collided with another vessel in the English Channel off the Isle of Wight and sank with the loss of seven of her 22 crew.
HMT Lord Denman	Royal Navy	The naval trawler was lost in the Arctic Sea on this date.
HMT Scott	Royal Navy	World War I: The naval trawler struck a mine and sank in the Thames Estuary off the Tongue Lightship (United Kingdom) with the loss of three of her crew.

== 23 October ==
List of shipwrecks: 23 October 1915
Ship	State	Description
Ilaro	United Kingdom	World War I: The cargo ship struck a mine and sank in the English Channel 4 nautical miles (7.4 km) east of Dungeness, Kent with the loss of a crew member.
Marquette	United Kingdom	World War I: The troopship was torpedoed and sunk in the Aegean Sea 36 nautical miles (67 km) south of Salonica, Greece by SM U-35 (Imperial German Navy) with the loss of 167 lives.
SMS Prinz Adalbert	Imperial German Navy	World War I: The Prinz Adalbert-class armored cruiser was torpedoed and sunk in the Baltic Sea 20 nautical miles (37 km) off Liepāja, Latvia by HMS E8 (Royal Navy) with the loss of 672 of her 675 crew.
Rumina	Sweden	World War I: The cargo ship was captured in the Baltic Sea by SM U-17 (Imperial German Navy). She was ordered into Libau, East Prussia, Germany but struck a mine en route and sank with the loss of six lives.

== 24 October ==
List of shipwrecks: 24 October 1915
Ship	State	Description
HMT Charity	Royal Navy	The naval trawler was lost on this date.
Isabel Monks	United Kingdom	The coaster collided with Ydun (Norway) in the Atlantic Ocean 17 nautical miles (31 km) off the Tuskar Rock, Ireland. Both vessels sank, their crews survived.
W. N. Zwicker	Canada	The schooner ran ashore on Cowes Reef near Shippan Point, Connecticut. Refloated and returned to service.

== 25 October ==
List of shipwrecks: 25 October 1915
Ship	State	Description
Selma	Norway	World War I: The cargo ship struck a mine and sank in the North Sea 25 nautical miles (46 km) east north east of North Foreland, Kent, United Kingdom with the loss of nineteen of her crew.
Trafalgar	United Kingdom	The full-rigged ship caught fire and was abandoned in the Atlantic Ocean (13°04′S 36°49′W). She subsequently foundered.
HMS Velox	Royal Navy	World War I: The Viper-class destroyer struck a mine and sank in the English Channel off the Nab Lightship (United Kingdom) (50°41′N 1°20′W) with the loss of four of her crew.

== 26 October ==
List of shipwrecks: 26 October 1915
Ship	State	Description
SMS Burgermeister Monckeberg	Imperial German Navy	The Vorpostenboot was lost on this date.
Wolfe	Sweden	The wooden barque departed from Burntisland for Malmö. Lost with all hands, 13 men, in the North Sea of unknown causes.

== 27 October ==
List of shipwrecks: 27 October 1915
Ship	State	Description
HMT Bonar Law	Royal Navy	The naval trawler was lost.
Frances R	United States	The 38-foot (11.6 m) motor vessel was found sunk near the mouth of the Chickamin River (55°47′N 130°58′W) in Southeast Alaska. The three men who had been aboard were never found, although evidence found aboard suggested that two of them had left her in a skiff which was found capsized in Behm Canal.

== 28 October ==
List of shipwrecks: 28 October 1915
Ship	State	Description
HMS Argyll	Royal Navy	The Devonshire-class cruiser ran aground on Inchcape, Forfarshire and was wrecked.
HMS Hythe	Royal Navy	The auxiliary minesweeper collided with the armed boarding steamer HMS Sarnia (Royal Navy) in the Dardanelles and sank with the loss of 154 lives.
No. 2	Imperial Russian Navy	The No. 1-class submarine was lost in the Barents Sea.

== 29 October ==
List of shipwrecks: 29 October 1915
Ship	State	Description
Shark	United States	The 19-gross register ton, 46.7-foot (14.2 m) fishing vessel was destroyed by fire at Seldovia, Territory of Alaska. Both people on board survived.

== 30 October ==
List of shipwrecks: 30 October 1915
Ship	State	Description
Claus Horn	Germany	The cargo vessel stranded in the Baltic Sea and was wrecked.
Turquoise	French Navy	World War I: The Émeraude-class submarine was sunk in the Dardanelles off Nagara Point, Turkey. She was refloated by Ottoman forces on 3 November and taken into the Ottoman Navy as Müstecip Onbaşı.

== 31 October ==
List of shipwrecks: 31 October 1915
Ship	State	Description
Alert	United States	The 14-gross register ton, 56.5-foot (17.2 m) motor passenger vessel sank near "Point Aloa" – presumably a reference to Point Alava (55°11′30″N 131°11′00″W) – in Southeast Alaska. All six people on board survived.
HMY Aries	Royal Navy	World War I: The naval yacht struck a mine and sank in the English Channel off Leathercoat Point, Kent (51°00′N 1°24′E) with the loss of 22 of her crew.
Eidsiva	Norway	World War I: The cargo ship struck a mine and sank in the English Channel off South Foreland, Kent. Her crew survived.
Gerard	Netherlands	The steam trawler was stranded near the island of Ameland and became a total loss.
HMT John G. Watson	Royal Navy	The naval trawler sank after collision with tanker Rosalind off Stornoway.
HMS Louis	Royal Navy	HMS Louis World War I: Dardanelles Campaign: The Laforey-class destroyer was shelled and sunk in Suvla Bay by Turkish coastal artillery.
HMT Othello II	Royal Navy	World War I: The naval trawler struck a mine and sank in the English Channel off Leathercoat Point with the loss of nine of her crew.
Toward	United Kingdom	World War I: The cargo ship struck a mine and sank in the English Channel off South Foreland. Her crew survived.

== Unknown date ==
List of shipwrecks: Unknown date October 1915
Ship	State	Description
Admiral	United States	The fishing vessel was lost in the Yukon River at Andreafsky, Territory of Alaska.
USS Stranger	United States	The Louisiana Naval Militia gunboat sank in mid-October at New Orleans, Louisiana, during the New Orleans Hurricane of 1915.
