= List of shipwrecks in December 1915 =

The list of shipwrecks in December 1915 includes ships sunk, foundered, grounded, or otherwise lost during December 1915.

== 1 December ==
List of shipwrecks: 1 December 1915
Ship	State	Description
Clan Macleod	United Kingdom	World War I: The cargo ship was shelled and sunk in the Mediterranean Sea 100 nautical miles (190 km) east south east of Malta (35°39′N 16°43′E) by SM U-33 (Imperial German Navy) with the loss of twelve crew.
HMS Comet	Royal Navy	The gunboat was lost on this date.

== 2 December ==
List of shipwrecks: 2 December 1915
Ship	State	Description
Commodore	United Kingdom	World War I: The cargo ship was scuttled in the Mediterranean Sea 160 nautical miles (300 km) east south east of Malta by SM U-33 (Imperial German Navy) with the loss of a crew member.
Norrvik	Sweden	World War I: The cargo ship, en route from Grimsby to Stockholm, struck a mine in the North Sea and sank immediately. Five casualties, but fourteen saved by the Norwegian steamer Ambra.

== 3 December ==
List of shipwrecks: 3 December 1915
Ship	State	Description
Dante	Italy	World War I: The coaster was sunk in the Mediterranean Sea off Sollum, Egypt (32°20′N 26°19′E) by SM U-39 (Imperial German Navy). Her crew survived.
HMT Etoile Polaire	Royal Navy	World War I: The naval trawler struck a mine and sank in the English Channel off the South Goodwin Lightship (United Kingdom). loss of 3 crew.
Yarhisar	Ottoman Navy	World War I: The Samsun-class destroyer was torpedoed and sunk in the Gulf of İzmit by HMS E11 (Royal Navy) with the loss of 42 of her 85 crew. HMS E11 rescued 42 survivors.
Zuaia	Italy	The tanker was destroyed by fire at Popvile.

== 4 December ==
List of shipwrecks: 4 December 1915
Ship	State	Description
Childe Harold	United States	The schooner went ashore on Hen and Chickens Reef, Nantucket Sound. Pulled off by United States Coast Guard cutters and returned to service.
Intrepido	Regia Marina	World War I: The Indomito-class destroyer struck a mine and sank in the Adriatic Sea off Vlorë, Albania.
Re Umberto	Italy	World War I: The passenger ship struck a mine laid by SM UC-14 (Imperial German Navy) and sank in the Adriatic Sea off Cape Linguetta, Albania. 94 people died.

== 5 December ==
List of shipwrecks: 5 December 1915
Ship	State	Description
Fresnel	French Navy	World War I: The Pluviôse-class submarine ran aground in the Adriatic Sea off Shëngjin, Albania. She subsequently was sunk by SMS Warasdiner (Austro-Hungarian Navy) Her 28 crew were taken as prisoners of war.
Helmsmuir	United Kingdom	World War I: The cargo ship was scuttled in the Mediterranean Sea 66 nautical miles (122 km) south by east of Gavdos, Greece by SM U-39 (Imperial German Navy). Her crew survived.
Pietro Lofaro	Italy	World War I: The sailing vessel was sunk in the Mediterranean Sea off Sollum, Egypt (32°52′N 26°53′E) by SM U-39 (Imperial German Navy).

== 6 December ==
List of shipwrecks: 6 December 1915
Ship	State	Description
L. G. Goulandris	Greece	World War I: The cargo ship was sunk in the Mediterranean Sea 150 nautical miles (280 km) north west of Alexandria, Egypt (32°15′N 27°25′E) by SM U-39 (Imperial German Navy). Her crew survived.
William L. Elkins	United States	The schooner was wrecked near Cape Cottage, Cape Elizabeth.

== 7 December ==
List of shipwrecks: 7 December 1915
Ship	State	Description
Umeta	United Kingdom	World War I: The cargo ship was shelled and sunk in the Mediterranean Sea 112 nautical miles (207 km) east south east of Malta (35°28′N 16°56′E) by SM U-33 (Imperial German Navy) with the loss of two crew.
Veria	United Kingdom	World War I: The cargo ship was scuttled in the Mediterranean Sea 24 nautical miles (44 km) north west by north of Alexandria, Egypt (31°30′N 29°28′E) by SM U-39 (Imperial German Navy). Her crew survived.

== 8 December ==
List of shipwrecks: 8 December 1915
Ship	State	Description
Ignis	United Kingdom	World War I: The cargo ship struck a mine and sank in the North Sea 5.5 nautical miles (10.2 km) north east of Aldeburgh, Suffolk. Her crew survived.

== 9 December ==
List of shipwrecks: 9 December 1915
Ship	State	Description
Busiris	United Kingdom	World War I: The cargo ship was shelled and sunk in the Mediterranean Sea 190 nautical miles (350 km) west north west of Alexandria, Egypt (32°50′N 26°20′E) by SM U-39 (Imperial German Navy). Her crew survived.
Klara	Sweden	The schooner suffered a damaged rudder in the North Sea and was abandoned at 56°23′N 3°34′E). Her crew were rescued by Vesta (Denmark).
Orteric	United Kingdom	World War I: The cargo ship was torpedoed and sunk in the Mediterranean Sea 140 nautical miles (260 km) south by east of Gavdos, Greece (32°02′N 25°03′E) by SM U-39 (Imperial German Navy) with the loss of two crew.
Papagello	Albania	World War I: The sailing vessel was sunk in the Adriatic Sea (41°40′N 19°25′E) by SM U-4 (Austro-Hungarian Navy)

== 10 December ==
List of shipwrecks: 10 December 1915
Ship	State	Description
Ingstad	Norway	World War I: The coaster struck a mine and sank in the North Sea four nautical miles (7.4 km) east of Aldeburgh, Suffolk. Her crew survived.
Nereus	Norway	World War I: The coaster struck a mine and sank in the North Sea with the loss of a crew member.
Porto Said	Italy	World War I: The cargo ship was sunk in the Mediterranean Sea 50 nautical miles (93 km) north east of Derna, Libya (32°38′N 23°35′E) by SM U-39 (Imperial German Navy). Her crew survived.
Taşköprü	Ottoman Navy	World War I: The gunboat was sunk off the coast of Kirpen Island by Russian destroyers.
Unknown barge	United States	The barge, under tow of Cheektowaga (United States), sank after loosing her tow line off Seaconnet, Rhode Island. Lost with all three hands.
Yozgat	Ottoman Navy	World War I: The Kastamonu-class gunboat was sunk off the Kirpen Islands by Russian destroyers.

== 11 December ==
List of shipwrecks: 11 December 1915
Ship	State	Description
Pinegrove	United Kingdom	World War I: The cargo ship struck a mine and sank in the English Channel 8 nautical miles (15 km) west of Cap Gris Nez, Pas-de-Calais, France with the loss of two of her crew.
Rosmed	Sweden	The cargo ship struck a rock and sank in the Norwegian Sea off Hindoen, Norway.
St. Kilda	United Kingdom	The cargo ship came ashore on Little Miquelon, Saint Pierre and Miquelon and was wrecked.

== 12 December ==
List of shipwrecks: 12 December 1915
Ship	State	Description
Cross Sand Lightship	United Kingdom	The lightship was struck by Marga (United Kingdom) and sank in the North Sea off the coast of Norfolk.
Reşit Paşa	Ottoman Navy	World War I: The transport ship was sunk in the Sea of Marmara off Sylivra by a French Navy submarine.
SMS V107	Imperial German Navy	World War I: The V105-class destroyer struck a mine and sank in the Baltic Sea off Liepāja, Latvia with the loss of a crew member.

== 13 December ==
List of shipwrecks: 13 December 1915
Ship	State	Description
Lanao	United States	The coaster was driven ashore on Marinduque Island, Philippines and was wrecked.
Lavengro	Denmark	The schooner was wrecked at St. John's, Newfoundland.

== 14 December ==
List of shipwrecks: 14 December 1915
Ship	State	Description
HMT Susanna	Royal Navy	The naval trawler was lost on this date.

== 15 December ==
List of shipwrecks: 15 December 1915
Ship	State	Description
Lucy Neff	United States	The steamer foundered 20 miles (32 km) east of Fenwick Island, Delaware after springing leaks in several days of rough weather. The vessel's crew was rescued by Chasehill (United Kingdom).

== 16 December ==
List of shipwrecks: 16 December 1915
Ship	State	Description
Lemnos	United Kingdom	The collier was lost on this date.
Majestic	United Kingdom	The cargo ship was destroyed by fire at Sarnia, Ontario, Canada.
Nyroca	United Kingdom	World War I: The cargo ship struck a mine and sank in the North Sea off the Kentish Knock Lightship (United Kingdom). Her crew were rescued by Pandion (United Kingdom )and a Royal Navy torpedo boat.

== 17 December ==
List of shipwrecks: 17 December 1915
Ship	State	Description
SMS Bremen	Imperial German Navy	World War I: The Bremen-class cruiser struck a mine and sank in the Baltic Sea off Ventspils, Lithuania.
Carolina	United States	The barque sprang a leak in the Atlantic Ocean off Galveston, Texas and was abandoned by her crew.
Marien	United Kingdom	The coaster came ashore at Hartlepool, County Durham and was abandoned by her crew. She broke in two on 24 December and was a total loss.
SMS V191	Imperial German Navy	World War I: The S138-class destroyer struck a mine and sank in the Baltic Sea.

== 18 December ==
List of shipwrecks: 18 December 1915
Ship	State	Description
Erzen	Albania	World War I: The sailing vessel was sunk in the Adriatic Sea (41°47′N 19°31′E) by SM U-15 (Austro-Hungarian Navy). Her crew survived.
Figlio Preligiona	Albania	World War I: The sailing vessel was sunk in the Adriatic Sea (41°47′N 19°31′E) by SM U-15 (Austro-Hungarian Navy). Her crew survived.
HMT Lottie Leask	Royal Navy	World War I: The naval trawler was shelled and sunk in the Adriatic Sea off Sazan Island, Albania (40°35′N 18°45′E) by SM U-39 (Imperial German Navy). Her crew survived.
Nico	Norway	World War I: The coaster struck a mine and sank in the North Sea 3.5 nautical miles (6.5 km) west of the Longsand Lightship (United Kingdom) with the loss of two of her crew.
Northmount	United Kingdom	The cargo ship sprang a leak in the Atlantic Ocean and was abandoned by her crew.

== 20 December ==
List of shipwrecks: 20 December 1915
Ship	State	Description
Belford	United Kingdom	World War I: The coaster was torpedoed and sunk in the English Channel off Boulogne, Pas-de-Calais, France by SM UB-10 (Imperial German Navy). Her crew survived.
Huntly	United Kingdom	( Red Cross): World War I: The cargo ship was torpedoed and sunk in the English Channel off the Boulogne Lightship (France) by SM UB-10 (Imperial German Navy) with the loss of two of her crew.

== 21 December ==
List of shipwrecks: 21 December 1915
Ship	State	Description
Henriette	Sweden	The wooden barque departed West Hartlepool destined for Uddevalla, and the only trace of her is an empty lifeboat that was found near Aberdeen. Fifteen casualties.
Huntley	United Kingdom	World War I: The merchant ship was torpedoed and sunk by the submarine SM UB-10 (Imperial German Navy) in the English Channel .75 miles (1.21 km) off the Boulogne light vessel.
Knarsdale	United Kingdom	World War I: The collier struck a mine and sank in the North Sea 2.75 nautical miles (5.09 km) east by south of Orfordness, Suffolk with the loss of a crew member.
HMS Lady Ismay	Royal Navy	World War I: The auxiliary minesweeper struck a mine and sank in the North Sea one nautical mile (1.9 km) north west of the Longsand Lightship (United Kingdom) (51°48′N 1°39′E) with the loss of eighteen of her crew.
Yasaka Maru	Japan	World War I: The passenger ship was sunk in the Mediterranean Sea 60 nautical miles (110 km) off Port Said, Egypt by SM U-38 (Imperial German Navy). Her crew and all 120 passengers were rescued by a French Navy gunboat.

== 22 December ==
List of shipwrecks: 22 December 1915
Ship	State	Description
Uddeholm	Sweden	The iron steamer departed Gothenburg destined for Kristiansund, and has not been heard from since. Twelve casualties. Whether the disappearance was war-related (mine) or as a result of the big storm during Christmas, has not been possible to ascertain.

== 23 December ==
List of shipwrecks: 23 December 1915
Ship	State	Description
Carib	United States	World War I: The cargo ship was sunk by a mine in the North Sea.
Freya	Imperial German Navy	The Vorpostenboot was lost on this date.
SMS S177	Imperial German Navy	World War I: The S138-class torpedo boat struck a mine and sank in the Baltic Sea with the loss of seven of her crew.
Skiblander	Norway	The schooner was driven ashore and wrecked at Johnshaven, Aberdeenshire, United Kingdom with the loss of one of her seven crew.

== 24 December ==
List of shipwrecks: 24 December 1915
Ship	State	Description
HMT Carilon	Royal Navy	World War I: The naval trawler struck a mine and sank in the North Sea off Margate, Kent. Her crew survived.
Embla	United Kingdom	World War I: The cargo ship struck a mine and was damaged in the Thames Estuary 3 nautical miles (5.6 km) east south east of the Tongue Lightship (United Kingdom). She was beached but was declared a total loss. Her crew survived.
Envermeu	United Kingdom	The cargo ship ran aground on the Goodwin Sands, Kent and was wrecked. Her crew were rescued.
Lady Iveagh	United Kingdom	The collier was wrecked at St. Quentin Point, Somme, France.
Moor	United Kingdom	The cargo ship sank at Dundee, Perthshire.
Ville de la Ciotat	France	World War I: The passenger ship was torpedoed and sunk in the Mediterranean Sea 105 nautical miles (194 km) south west of Cape Matapan, Greece (35°10′N 21°26′E) by SM U-34 (Imperial German Navy) with the loss of 81 lives. Survivors were rescued by Moroe (United Kingdom).
Yeddo	United Kingdom	World War I: The cargo ship was scuttled in the Mediterranean Sea 122 nautical miles (226 km) south west by south of Cape Matapan by SM U-34 (Imperial German Navy). Her crew were rescued by Natal (Denmark).

== 25 December ==
List of shipwrecks: 25 December 1915
Ship	State	Description
Lovspring	Norway	The barque was driven ashore and wrecked on the coast of Northumberland, United Kingdom.
Nereus	Sweden	The steamer, en route from Boston, Lincolnshire to Copenhagen, struck a mine in the North Sea at (53°39′N 1°17′E) and sank. Her crew were rescued.
Van Stirum	United Kingdom	World War I: The passenger ship was torpedoed and sunk in the Atlantic Ocean 8 nautical miles (15 km) south south west of the Smalls Lighthouse (51°55′N 6°16′W) by SM U-24 (Imperial German Navy) with the loss of two crew.
Yrsa	Denmark	The cargo ship ran aground in Aalebeks Bay. Her crew were rescued.

== 26 December ==
List of shipwrecks: 26 December 1915
Ship	State	Description
Cottingham	United Kingdom	World War I: The coaster was shelled and sunk in the Bristol Channel 16 nautical miles (30 km) south west of Lundy Island, Devon by SM U-24 (Imperial German Navy) with the loss of seven crew.
HMS E6	Royal Navy	World War I: The E-class submarine struck a mine and sank in the North Sea off Harwich, Essex with the loss of 31 of her crew.
Ministre Beernaert	Belgium	World War I: The cargo ship was sunk in the Bristol Channel 40 nautical miles (74 km) west by south of Lundy Island (50°50′N 5°33′W) by SM U-24 (Imperial German Navy).
Minnie Slauson	United States	The schooner sank off Auburn Light, New York.
HMT Resono	Royal Navy	World War I: The naval trawler struck a mine and sank in the North Sea 2 nautical miles (3.7 km) south east by east of the Sunk Lightship (United Kingdom) with the loss of thirteen of her crew.

== 27 December ==
List of shipwrecks: 27 December 1915
Ship	State	Description
Clan Davidson	United Kingdom	The cargo ship was driven ashore at Ballyquinton, County Down. She was refloated and beached in Belfast Lough.
Elizabeth Jane	United Kingdom	The schooner foundered in the Bristol Channel off The Mumbles, Glamorgan with the loss of all hands.
Export	Sweden	The cargo ship sprang a leak in the North Sea of the coast of the Netherlands and was abandoned. Her crew were rescued.
HMT Ferndale	Royal Navy	The naval trawler foundered in the Irish Sea off St. Ann's Head, Pembrokeshire with the loss of all hands.
Hadley	United Kingdom	World War I: The cargo ship struck a mine and sank in the North Sea 3 nautical miles (5.6 km) south east of the Shipwash Lightship (United Kingdom). Her crew survived.
HMT Ladysmith	Royal Navy	The naval trawler foundered in the Irish Sea off the coast of Wales.
Lyra	Denmark	The schooner was driven ashore at Lyngør, Aust-Agder, Norway and was wrecked. Her crew were rescued.
Mary Jane	United Kingdom	The schooner foundered in Swansea Bay with the loss of all hands.
Thor	Denmark	The galeass capsized in the Baltic Sea off Oxö, Sweden.
HM Torpedo Boat 46	Royal Navy	The TB26-class torpedo boat ran out of coal during a voyage from Port Said, Egypt, to Mudros and was wrecked while under tow in the Aegean Sea off Lemnos, Greece. She was salvaged and returned to service.

== 28 December ==
List of shipwrecks: 28 December 1915
Ship	State	Description
El Zorro	United Kingdom	World War I: The tanker was torpedoed and sunk in the Atlantic Ocean 10 nautical miles (19 km) south of the Old Head of Kinsale, County Cork by SM U-24 (Imperial German Navy) with the loss of two of her crew.

== 29 December ==
List of shipwrecks: 29 December 1915
Ship	State	Description
Abbie	United States	The barge sank on Red Hook Flats, New York.
Erin	Netherlands	World War I: The trawler caught a mine in her nets and sank in the North Sea off IJmuiden, North Holland when it exploded. Three of her eleven crew were killed.
Kenkoku Maru	Japan	World War I: The cargo ship was sunk in the Mediterranean Sea 75 nautical miles (139 km) south west of Crete, Greece (34°07′N 22°12′E) by SM U-34 (Imperial German Navy). Her crew survived.
SMS Lika	Austro-Hungarian Navy	World War I: The Tatra-class destroyer struck a mine and sank in the Adriatic Sea off Durazzo, Albania.
Monge	French Navy	World War I: Battle of Durazzo: The Pluviose-class submarine was rammed and sunk in the Adriatic Sea off Kotor, Austria-Hungary, by one of six warships including SMS Helgoland and five Tatra-class destroyers (all Austro-Hungarian Navy).
Morning	United Kingdom	The cargo ship was sunk on this date with the loss of all but two of her crew.
SMS Triglav	Austro-Hungarian Navy	World War I: The Tatra-class destroyer struck a mine and was damaged in the Adriatic Sea off Durazzo. SMS Csepel and SMS Tatra (both Austro-Hungarian Navy) attempted to take her in tow but were unsuccessful. She was shelled and sunk by Casque (French Navy) and five other French Navy ships.

== 30 December ==
List of shipwrecks: 30 December 1915
Ship	State	Description
Abelia	United Kingdom	World War I: The cargo ship was shelled and sunk in the Mediterranean Sea 152 nautical miles (282 km) west of Gavdos, Greece (34°24′N 20°51′E) by SM U-34 (Imperial German Navy). Her crew survived.
Clan Macfarlane	United Kingdom	World War I: The cargo ship was torpedoed and sunk in the Mediterranean Sea 66 nautical miles (122 km) south east of Cape Martello, Crete, Greece by SM U-38 (Imperial German Navy) with the loss of 52 crew.
Ellewoutsdijk	Netherlands	World War I: The cargo ship struck a mine and sank in the North Sea 1.5 nautical miles (2.8 km) off the Galloper Lightship (United Kingdom) (51°42′N 1°57′E).
Glenariff	United Kingdom	The cargo ship departed Newport, Monmouthshire for Belfast, County Antrim. No further trace, presumed foundered in the Irish Sea with the loss of all ten crew.
HMS Natal	Royal Navy	HMS Natal The Duke of Edinburgh-class cruiser was sunk in the Cromarty Firth by an internal explosion with the loss of at least 390 lives.
Nyack	United States	The steamer burned to the waterline at dock at the Crosby Transportation Company, Muskegon, Michigan. Taken to Sturgeon Bay, Wisconsin in 1917 and converted into a barge.
Persia	United Kingdom	World War I: The passenger ship was torpedoed and sunk in the Mediterranean Sea off Crete (34°08′N 26°19′E) by SM U-38 (Imperial German Navy) with the loss of 343 of the 519 people on board.

== 31 December ==
List of shipwrecks: 31 December 1915
Ship	State	Description
Dana	Denmark	The three-masted schooner was driven ashore at Craster, Northumberland, United Kingdom and was wrecked.
HMT Responso	Royal Navy	The naval trawler was lost on this date.
Satrap	United Kingdom	The collier foundered in the Irish Sea off Manorbier, Pembrokeshire with the loss of all eleven crew.
HMT Speeton	Royal Navy	World War I: The naval trawler struck a mine and sank in the North Sea off Lowestoft, Suffolk (52°33′N 1°50′E) with the loss of eleven of her crew.
Tynemouth	United Kingdom	The collier was lost in the Irish Sea on this date.

== Unknown date ==
List of shipwrecks: Unknown date 1915
Ship	State	Description
Active	United Kingdom	The whaler foundered off the Orkney Islands over the Christmas period with the loss of all twenty crew.
Dora	United States	The schooner barge either sunk south west of the Fenwick Island Lightship on 11 December, or went lost by stranding at Hyannis, Massachusetts on 13 December.
Ella M. Doughty	United States	The fishing schooner sailed from Gloucester, Massachusetts on 3 November to Little Bay Islands, Newfoundland on a fishing trip and vanished. Believed lost in a gale in November or on 5 December. Lost with all six hands.
Orleanian	United States	The steamer left New York City for Malta on 23 December 1915 or 1916, and probably sank in a storm on 26 December. Lost with all 36 hands.
Thomas Winsmore	United States	The schooner was abandoned during a storm off the coast of Florida.
Wood	United Kingdom	The vessel was sunk as a blockship.
