= Small nucleolar RNA SNORD14 =

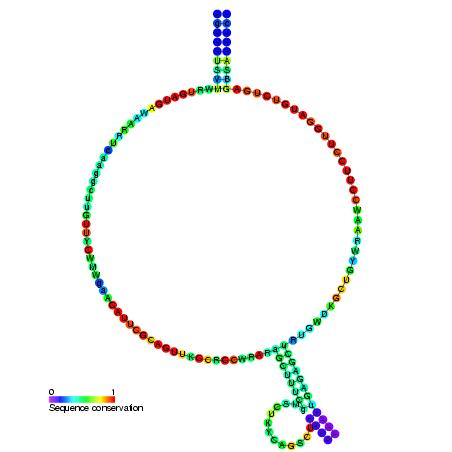
- Predicted secondary structure and sequence conservation of SNORD14

Identifiers
- Symbol: SNORD14
- Alt. Symbols: U14
- Rfam: RF00016

Other data
- RNA type: Gene; snRNA; snoRNA; CD-box
- Domain: Eukaryota
- GO: GO:0006396 GO:0005730
- SO: SO:0000593
- PDB structures: PDBe

In molecular biology, U14 small nucleolar RNA (U14 snoRNA) is a non-coding RNA required for early cleavages of eukaryotic precursor rRNAs. In yeasts, this molecule possesses a stem-loop region (known as the Y-domain) which is essential for function. A similar structure, but with a different consensus sequence, is found in plants, but is absent in vertebrates. In human there are two closely related copies called SNORD14A and SNORD14B that are expressed from the intron of their host gene ribosomal protein Rps13.
