= Type UC I submarine =

German World War I coastal submarine class for minelaying

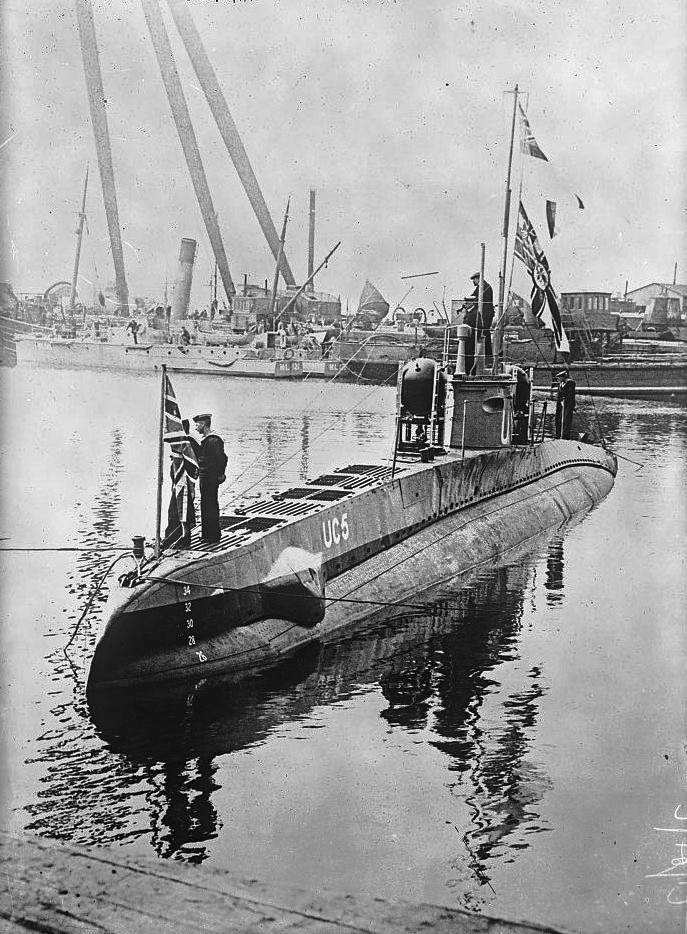
- Type UC I submarine, UC-5

Class overview
- Builders: AG Weser, Bremen; AG Vulkan Hamburg
- Operators: Imperial German Navy; Royal Netherlands Navy; Austro-Hungarian Navy; Regia Marina
- Succeeded by: UC II
- Built: 1915
- In commission: 1915–1932
- Planned: 15
- Completed: 15
- Lost: 14
- Scrapped: 1
- Preserved: 0

General characteristics
- Type: coastal minelaying submarine
- Displacement: surfaced: 168 t (165 long tons); submerged: UC-1 – UC-10: 182 t (179 long tons); UC-11 – UC-15: 183 t (180 long tons)
- Length: o/a: 33.99 m (111 ft 6 in); pressure hull: UC-1 – UC-10: 29.62 m (97 ft 2 in); UC-11 – UC-15: 29.81 m (97 ft 10 in)
- Beam: 3.15 m (10 ft 4 in)
- Height: 6.30 m (20 ft 8 in)
- Draught: UC-1 - UC-10: 3.04 m (10 ft 0 in); UC-11 – UC-15: 3.06 m (10 ft 0 in)
- Propulsion: 1 shaft; UC-1 – UC-10: 4-cylinder Daimler RS166 diesel engine, 90 PS (66 kW; 89 bhp); UC-11 – UC-15: 6-cylinder Benz diesel engine, 80 PS (59 kW; 79 bhp); Siemens-Schuckert electric motor, 175 PS (129 kW; 173 shp)
- Speed: UC-1 – UC-10: 6.20 knots (11.48 km/h; 7.13 mph) surfaced; 5.22 knots (9.67 km/h; 6.01 mph) submerged; UC-11 – UC-15: 6.49 knots (12.02 km/h; 7.47 mph) surfaced; 5.67 knots (10.50 km/h; 6.52 mph) submerged
- Range: UC-1 – UC-10: 780 nmi (1,440 km; 900 mi) at 5 knots (9.3 km/h; 5.8 mph) surfaced; 50 nmi (93 km; 58 mi) at 4 knots (7.4 km/h; 4.6 mph) submerged; UC-11 – UC-15: 910 nmi (1,690 km; 1,050 mi) at 5 knots (9.3 km/h; 5.8 mph) surfaced; 50 nmi (93 km; 58 mi) at 4 knots (7.4 km/h; 4.6 mph) submerged
- Test depth: 50 m (160 ft)
- Complement: 14 men
- Armament: 12 UC 120 mines in 6 × 100 centimetres (39 in) mine shafts; 1 * 8 millimetres (0.31 in) machine gun

The Type UC I coastal submarines were a class of small minelaying U-boats built in Germany during the early part of World War I. They were the first operational minelaying submarines in the world, although the Russian submarine Krab was laid down earlier. A total of fifteen boats were built. The class is sometimes also referred to as the UC-1 class after SM UC-1, the class leader. Eleven of these U-boats joined the Flanders U-boat flotilla whilst the other four went to the Pola Flotilla.

== Design ==
On 18 August 1914, ten days after the start of World War I, the German Navy started to explore the idea of small, coastal submarines which could be built in a matter of months. On 11 September the idea was rejected but on 25 August as the German Army made rapid advances in Belgium and reached the coast, the idea was revived and the German Navy asked naval yards to design a small U-boat which could be transported by rail. On 15 October fifteen Type UB I U-boats were ordered, with an expected construction time of four months only. Based on the same Type UB I, the German Navy ordered on 23 November a further fifteen Type UC I coastal minelaying U-boats. As the traditional U-boat yards, Kaiserliche Werft Danzig and Germaniawerft, were already overloaded with orders and since AG Weser had started U-boat construction with the previous Type UB I, ten Type UC I were ordered from the AG Vulcan yard in Hamburg, and a further five from AG Weser. These yards expected a building time of five to six months.

The Type UC I had a revised bow section housing inclined minelaying tubes and uprated engines to compensate for the increased displacement and less streamlined form. The boats were armed with six internal mine tubes with 12 mines. To make it possible to lay mines whilst moving, the mine shaft were not mounted vertically but at a slope. The minelaying system was difficult to operate, and when some U-boats were lost without trace it was suspected that mines became armed before exiting their tubes and exploded prematurely. Most of the wrecks of these U-boats have been located and dived on, their mine shafts were found empty, contradicting the premature explosion theory.

The ten Type UC I submarines UC-1 – UC-10 built by AG Vulcan Hamburg were powered on the surface by a four-cylinder, four-stroke Daimler RS166 diesel engine producing 90 brake horsepower (67 kW), whilst the five U-boats UC-11 – UC-15, built by AG Weser received six-cylinder, four-stroke Benz diesel engine producing 80 bhp (60 kW). The pressure hull of the Hamburg U-boats was 29.62 m (97 ft 2 in) long, on the Weser U-boats the pressure hull was 29.81 m (97 ft 10 in) long. This caused small differences in weight, draught, speed and endurance between these two series of U-boats: UC-1 – UC-10 had a maximum surface speed of 6.20 knots (11.48 km/h; 7.13 mph) and could travel 780 nmi (1,440 km; 900 mi) at 5 knots (9.3 km/h; 5.8 mph). UC-11 – UC-15 had a maximum surface speed of 6.49 knots (12.02 km/h; 7.47 mph) and could travel 910 nmi (1,690 km; 1,050 mi) at 5 knots (9.3 km/h; 5.8 mph).

The Type UC I had a displacement of 168 tonnes (165 long tons) when at the surface and 182 tonnes (179 long tons) while submerged and had a draught of 3.04 m (9 ft 11.7 in). UC-11 – UC-15 displaced 183 tonnes (180 long tons) submerged and had a draught of 3.06 m (10 ft 0.5 in). They had a length overall of 33.99 m (111 ft 6 in) and a beam of 3.15 m (10 ft 4 in). Whilst submerged, the submarines were powered by an electric motor producing 175 metric horsepower (129 kW; 173 shp), and one propeller shaft, which provided a maximum submerged speed of 5.22 knots (9.67 km/h; 6.01 mph). When submerged, they could operate for 50 nautical miles (93 km; 58 mi) at 4 knots (7.4 km/h; 4.6 mph). They were capable of operating at a depth of 50 metres (160 ft).

They were fitted with six 100-centimetre (39 in) mine tubes, twelve UC 120 mines, and one 8-millimetre (0.31 in) machine gun. The mine shafts were not mounted in the pressure hull, but were open to the sea. The mines were kept in wet storage and were not accessible from within the U-boat. The depth setting had to be determined before they were stowed in the tubes so once the U-boat left on patrol, the target zone could not be altered anymore, unless it required the same depth setting. Their complement was fourteen crew members. In 1916 UC-11 was fitted with a single external bow torpedo tube.

In the summer of 1915 it became clear that the war was not going to end soon, and more coastal U-boats were needed. The small Type UB I and Type UC I U-boats had fulfilled the expectations, but had their disadvantages. When the one-shaft drivetrain broke down, the U-boat was helpless. A two-shaft drivetrain would be more robust and secure. The lack of any offensive weapons like a deck gun or torpedoes caused much frustration as U-boat commanders could not engage any target going back and forth between the English coast. Therefore no more Type UC I were ordered, but these issues were corrected in the subsequent Type UC II.

== History ==
A total of 15 Type UC I submarines were built, only two of which, UC-5 and UC-8, survived the war.

Name	launched (1915)	commissioned (1915)	ships sunk (nbr/GRT)	Fate
UC-1	26 April	7 May	38 / 59.088	Missing after 18 July 1917. Possibly sunk in a minefield off Nieuport.
UC-2	12 May	17 May	none	Sunk by its own mines on 30 June 1915 in the North Sea.
UC-3	28 May	1 June	19 / 28.266	Sunk by a mine on 27 May 1916 in the North Sea.
UC-4	6 June	10 June	32 / 35.070	Scuttled on 5 October 1918 off the coast of Flanders.
UC-5	13 June	19 June	29 / 36.288	Grounded on the Thames Estuary on 27 April 1916, captured and scrapped.
UC-6	20 June	24 June	54 / 64.064	Sunk by a mine on 27 September 1917 in the Thames estuary.
UC-7	6 July	9 July	29 / 45.270	Missing after 5 July 1916 north of Zeebrugge. Possibly sunk by a mine.
UC-8	July	5 July	none	Grounded on the Dutch coast on 4 November 1915, interned and served in the Royal Netherlands Navy as the HLNMS M-1 until broken up in 1932.
UC-9	11 July	15 July	none	Sunk by one of its own mines on 21 October 1915 in the North Sea.
UC-10	15 July	17 July	15 / 30.078	Sunk on 21 August 1916 in the North Sea by British submarine HMS E54.
UC-11	11 April	23 April	25 / 33.198	Sunk in a minefield on 24 July 1917 in the English Channel.
UC-12	29 April	2 May	5 / 3.039	Sunk on 16 June 1916 off Taranto. Raised and repaired by the Italians and on 13 April 1917 commissioned in the Italian Navy as X 1. She was scrapped in 1919.
UC-13	May	15 May	3 / 387	Grounded in the Black Sea on 29 November 1915.
UC-14	13 May	5 June	14 / 8.967	Sunk by British mine on 3 October 1917 off Zeebrugge.
UC-15	19 May	28 June	1 / 3.905	Sunk by its own mines on 30 November 1916 in the Black Sea following an encounter with Smeul.

=== Flanders Flotilla ===
On 26 May 1915 the first Type UC I minelayer UC-11 arrived at Zeebrugge and nine more joined in 1915. UC-1, UC-2, UC-3, UC-5, UC-6, UC-7, UC-9 and UC-10 were transported by rail to the Kaiserliche Werft Antwerpen in Hoboken, re-assembled and then transferred on pontoons, towed by barges, to Bruges. UC-8 and UC-9 served a few months as training U-boats in Kiel, before sailing in October 1915 to the Flanders Flotilla in Zeebrugge. UC-8 was lost during the transit voyage. UC-4 was stationed in Kurland until February 1916 before joining the Flanders Flotilla in Zeebrugge that same month. The first patrol by a Type UC I, the UC-11, on 29 May 1915 was very successful: five ships sank on the twelve mines laid by her in the vicinity of the Goodwin Sands, and the destroyer HMS Mohawk was damaged. By end September 1915 Type UC I boats had executed 42 operations, laying 39 minefields which claimed 25 ships. These minelayers operated in the English Channel as far as Le Havre and Yarmouth, but their main activity was in Thames Estuary and The Downs. The first Type UC I to be lost was UC-2: she was rammed whilst submerged by a British ship on 2 July, sank and blew up on her own mines a day later. British divers could locate the wreck, and when they discovered a minelaying submarine, the British finally understood the origin of the many mysterious minefields before their coast. In Autumn 1915 two Type UC I were lost: UC-9 was lost with all hands on 21 October and UC-8 ran aground in Holland and was interned on 4 November.

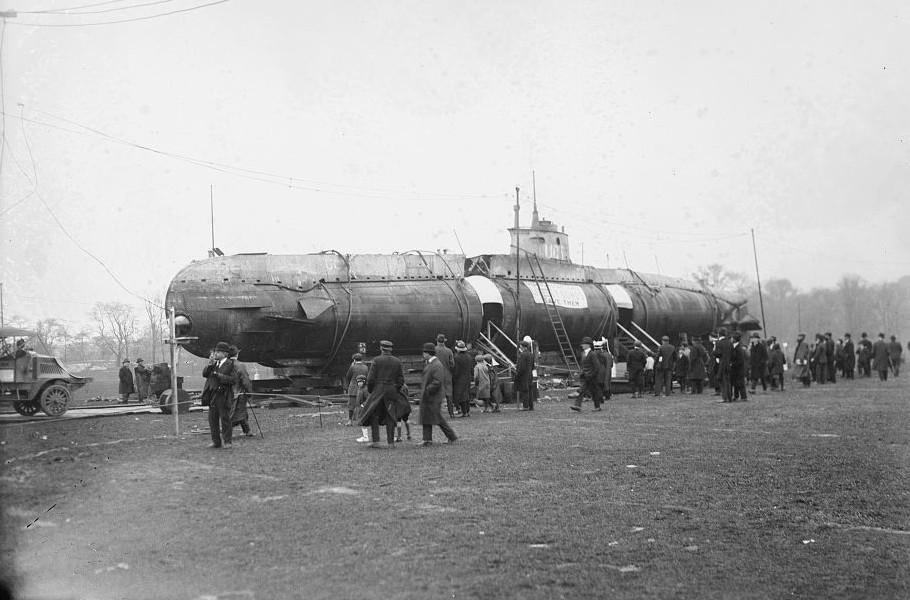
The UC-5 which had run aground in England, was salvaged and put on public display in New York in 1916.

Between October 1915 and March 1916 the Type UC I U-boats of the Flanders Flotilla operated in two zones: UC-1, UC-3 and UC-5 operated between the lightships Kentish Knock, Galloper and Sunk, and UC-6, UC-7 and UC-10 operated on the shipping lanes north of the Thames until Humber. They sank 75 ships, including twenty-three neutrals. During this period UC-11 was in the shipyard for repairs. After the first unrestricted U-boat campaign came to a complete halt in March 1916, the naval blockade of the UK could only be continued with mines so the Type UC I U-boats were the only U-boats able to carry on attacks on merchant shipping. Between May and August 1917 seventeen ships were lost on their mines, but by 1917 only UC-4 and UC-11 were left in the Flanders Flotilla. UC-3, UC-7 and UC-10 had been lost with all hands in 1916 and UC-5 ran aground in the Thames estuary. Its scuttling charges failed to detonate the mines and the British captured the only lightly damaged U-boat, providing them more insight on how German minelaying U-boats were operated. In order to compensate partially the losses, UC-14 was transferred by rail from the Adriatic Sea to Flanders, but was lost nine months later in a British minefield. In 1918 UC-11 was lost in a German minefield before the English coast, that the British had left deliberately unswept in order to lure minelayers into their own trap. At the end of the war, only UC-4 remained, and was scuttled when the German Army retreated from the Belgian coast in October 1918.

=== Pola and Constantinople Flotilla ===
Given the weakness of the Austro-Hungarian Navy and the need to help their Turkish Allies, the German Navy prepared to send U-boats to the Dardanelles and Black Sea. In March 1915 some Type UB I U-boats had already been disassembled, transported by rail to Pola at the Adriatic Sea and re-assembled there, in order to sail to Constantinople. After their completion in the AG Weser shipyard, UC-12 – UC-15 followed in June 1915. These U-boats flew the Austro-Hungarian flag, and received an Austro-Hungarian boat designations but kept their German crews with German uniforms. UC-12, UC-13, UC-14 and UC-15 were commissioned in the Austrian-Hungarian Navy as U-24, U-25, U-18 and U-19 respectively. UC-13 and UC-15 sailed to Constantinople, whilst UC-12 and UC-14 remained in the Adriatic Sea. UC-12 started operations on 27 June 1915 and was lost on 16 March 1916 whilst mining the harbour of Taranto. The Italians were able to locate the wreck of the U-boat, raised it and discovered that the submarine was German, with a German crew. At that time, Germany was not yet at war with Italy, and this incident was an additional motivation to declare war on Germany later that year. UC-13 operated in the Black Sea but ran hard aground in heavy weather 55 miles East of the Bosporus and was scuttled by its crew. The Mediterranean minelayers achieved their greatest success when the Italian pre-dreadnought battleship Regina Margherita sank on 12 December 1916 on a mine laid by UC-14. UC-15 disappeared without a trace on a minelaying mission to the Sulina estuary on the Romanian coast in the Black Sea.
