= February 1916 =

Month in 1916

<<	February 1916					>>
Su	Mo	Tu	We	Th	Fr	Sa
		1	2	3	4	5
6	7	8	9	10	11	12
13	14	15	16	17	18	19
20	21	22	23	24	25	26
27	28	29

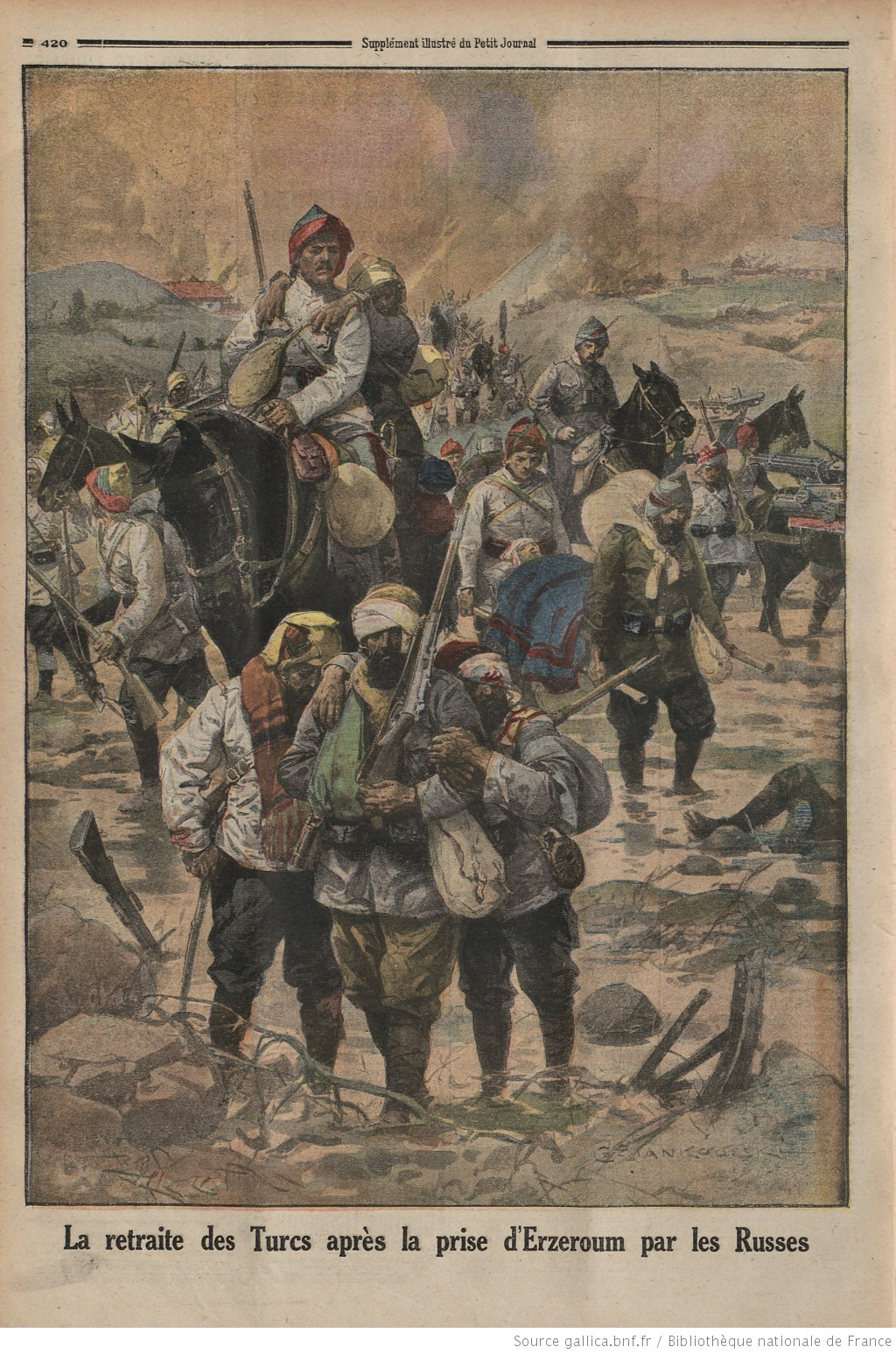
Retreat of the Turks after Erzeroum Le Petit Journal

The following events occurred in February 1916:

== February 1, 1916 (Tuesday) ==
- A night raid by German Zeppelins on the West Midlands of England claimed 35 lives, with Tipton suffering the heaviest losses with 14 fatalities.
- The airship Zeppelin LZ 54 crashed in the North Sea on its return from bombing the English midlands. All 16 crew drowned when the crew of a British fishing boat refused to rescue them.
- British troop ship SS Empress Queen ran aground off the Isle of Wight and had to be abandoned.
- The Royal Flying Corps established the No. 35 Squadron.
- The new German cruiser SMS Emden, taking the legacy name from its famous predecessor, was launched by AG Weser in Bremen. She would survive the war but would be scuttled along with many ships with the Imperial German Navy in 1919.
- Danish composer Carl Nielsen conducted the première of his Symphony No. 4, the Inextinguishable, in Copenhagen.
- The secondary school Lycée Moulay Youssef opened in Rabat, Morocco and received its charter on February 17.
- New South Wales Department of Education and Communities in Australia published the first edition of School Magazine, a literary publication for schoolchildren. It remains the longest-running children's magazine in the world.
- Born:
  - Bruce Gordon, American actor, best known for his gangster roles in the TV series The Untouchables; in Fitchburg, Massachusetts, United States (d. 2011)
  - Jack Lyons, British finance executive, key figure in the Guinness share-trading fraud scandal in 1987; as Isidore Jack Lyons, in Leeds, England (d. 2008)

== February 2, 1916 (Wednesday) ==
- Imperial Trans-Antarctic Expedition – British Antarctic expedition commander Ernest Shackleton sent a larger party to bring back the third lifeboat from the sunken polar ship Endurance in anticipation of crossing open water during the Antarctic summer thaw. The crew had been on the open ice for close to three months, with seal meat being the primary staple to preserve packaged meals. Their teams of dogs were also reduced to two teams, with the others being shot to ensure more seal meat for expedition members.
- A German zeppelin that disappeared on the air raid to Liverpool four days earlier was spotted by the British naval trawler King Stephen floating in the North Sea. After briefly speaking with Zeppelin Captain Odo Löwe and the crew, the trawler left the German air crew to their fate.
- The 3rd Australian Division was established and would become the longest serving Australian division in the country's military history.
- Two dioceses were established in Honduras - the Roman Catholic Diocese of San Pedro Sula and the Roman Catholic Diocese of Santa Rosa de Copán.
- Born: Al McWilliams, American cartoonist, artist for Dateline: Danger! which featured Danny Raven, the first leading African-American character in a comic strip; as Alden Spurr McWilliams, in New York City, United States (d. 1993)

== February 3, 1916 (Thursday) ==
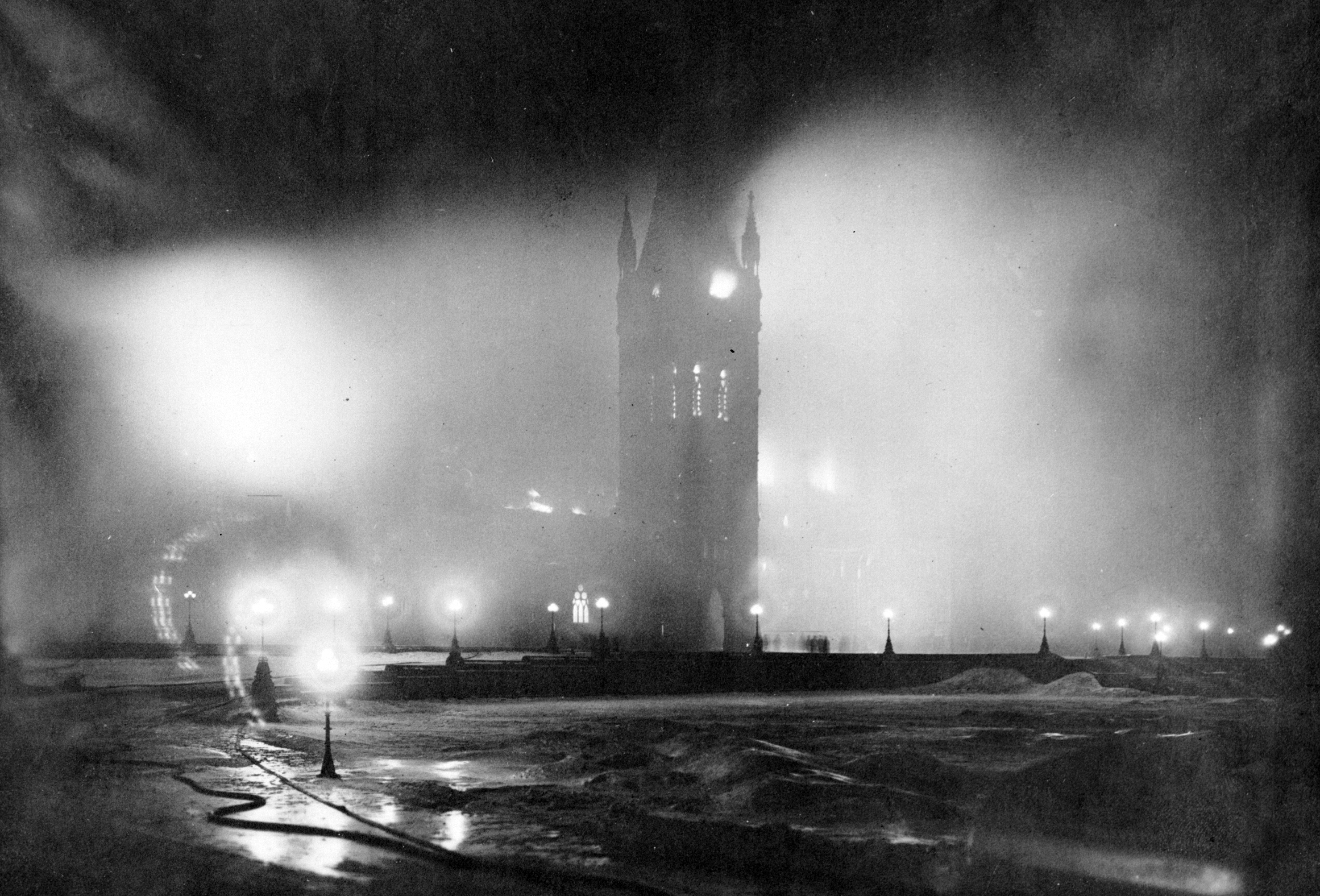
The Centre Block of Parliament Hill ablaze in Ottawa, 1916

- A fire killed seven people and destroyed most of the Centre Block, the home of the Parliament of Canada, on Parliament Hill in Ottawa, Canada. The fire, which started in the House of Commons reading room while Parliament was in session, was likely caused from an improperly extinguished cigar or faulty electrical wiring, although an investigating commission also put forth the theory sabotage could have also been a likely cause.
- The Patna High Court was established in Patna, Bihar, India.
- The Roman Catholic Diocese of Guaxupé was established in Guaxupé, Brazil.
- A solar eclipse occurred over the northern tip of South America.
- Born: Daniel Canónico, Venezuelan baseball player, pitcher of the Venezuela national baseball team for the 1941 Baseball World Cup; in Barquisimeto, Venezuela (d. 1975)

== February 4, 1916 (Friday) ==
- The Banaras Hindu University was established in Varanasi, India by education leader Madan Mohan Malaviya.
- Born: Pudlo Pudlat, Canadian Inuk artist, noted sketching and prints included Shores of the Settlement, In Celebration and Aeroplane; on Baffin Island, Northwest Territories, Canada (now Nunavut) (d. 1992)

== February 5, 1916 (Saturday) ==
- Trebizond Campaign – The Russian Empire launched a naval and land campaign to capture to port Trabzon, Turkey from the Ottoman Empire, where a large population of Armenians had been deported during the Armenian genocide.
- The British Fourth Army was established under command of General Henry Rawlinson and would be one of the key British forces during the Battle of the Somme.
- Royal Navy cruiser HMS Courageous was launched at Armstrong Whitworth shipyard in Newcastle upon Tyne, England, and would serve out World War I. It was recommissioned for service as an aircraft carrier at the start of World War II but sunk by a German submarine in 1939.
- German poet Hugo Ball and his future wife Emmy Hennings opened the Cabaret Voltaire in Zürich, a gathering for poets and intellectuals who were associated with Dadaism, including Marcel Janco, Richard Huelsenbeck, Tristan Tzara, and Sophie Taeuber-Arp and Jean Arp.
- Born: Daniel Santos, Puerto Rican singer, credited for popularizing the bolero style of singing in the United States; in Santurce, San Juan, Puerto Rico (d. 1992)
- Died:
  - Francesco Marconi, 61-63, Italian opera singer, known for his performances at Teatro Real and La Scala (b. 1853/1855)
  - Alexander Wilson Drake, 72-73, American artist and author, best known for Three Midnight Stories collection (b. 1843)

== February 6, 1916 (Sunday) ==
- Aircraft from the Imperial Russian Navy sank the Ottoman collier Irmingard, the largest ship sunk by air attack in World War I.
- Born:
  - William H. Blanchard, American air force officer, Vice Chief of Staff of the United States Air Force from 1965 to 1966; in Boston, United States (d. 1966)
  - Esther Figueiredo Ferraz, Brazilian politician, Minister of Education from 1982 to 1985, first woman in Brazil to hold a cabinet position; in São Paulo, Brazil (d. 2008)
- Died: Rubén Darío, 49, Nicaraguan writer, credited as the "father of modernismo (modernism)" in Spanish literature, author of Azul..., Prosas profanas y otros poemas and Cantos de vida y esperanza (b. 1867)

== February 7, 1916 (Monday) ==
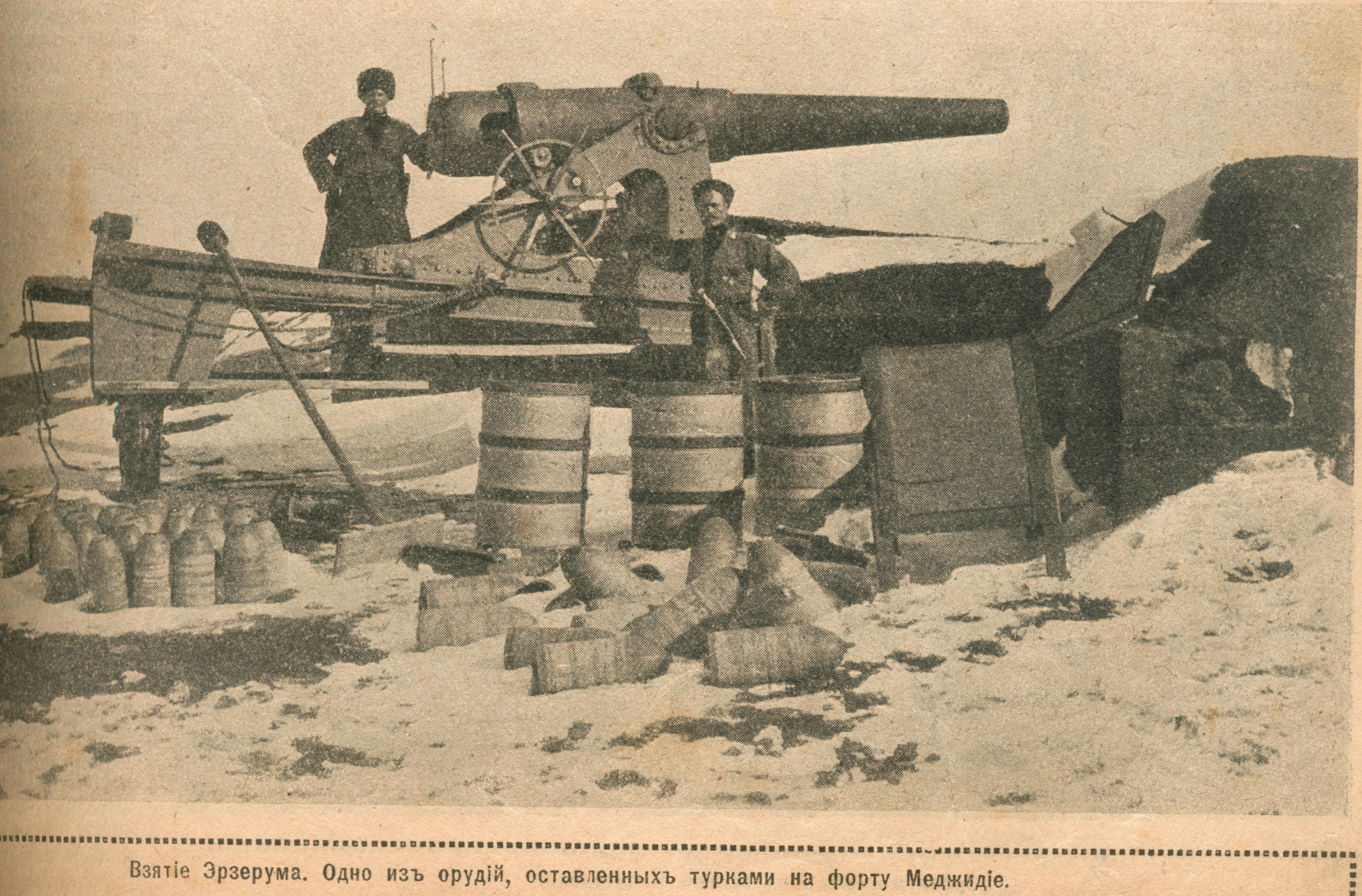
The Russians soldiers in front of captured Turkish guns during the Erzurum Offensive.

- Erzurum Offensive – The Russian offense succeeded in capturing the Turkish towns of Hınıs and Muş, the provincial capital of Muş Province in the Ottoman Empire (now eastern Turkey).
- British destroyer HMS Nomad was launched by Alexander Stephen and Sons at Glasgow, but would be sunk at the Battle of Jutland five months later.
- Lady Hardinge Medical College was established in New Delhi. It was named after the late Winifred Sturt, also known as Lady Hardinge, wife of Charles Hardinge, Viceroy of India, who envisioned a college that provided women opportunities to study medicine.
- Born:
  - Joseph Stephen Crane, American business executive, owner of the Luau and Kon Tiki restaurant chain, former husband to Lana Turner; as Joseph Stephenson Crane, in Crawfordsville, Indiana, United States (d. 1985)
  - Frank Hyde, Australian rugby player, player for the Newtown Bluebags, (now Newtown Jets), Balmain Tigers, North Sydney Bears and New South Wales Rugby League; as Francis Patrick Aloysius Hyde, in Millers Point, New South Wales, Australia (d. 2007)
- Died: William Peters Hepburn, 82, American politician, U.S. Representative from Iowa from 1881 to 1887, and from 1893 to 1909 (b. 1833)

== February 8, 1916 (Tuesday) ==
- French cruiser Amiral Charner was torpedoed and sunk by German submarine SM U-21 off the coast of Egypt, killing 427 sailors.
- Louis Botha, Prime Minister of South Africa, presided over the official opening of the University of Fort Hare in Alice, Eastern Cape, South Africa. The first classes commenced on February 22.
- Argentine tango composer Roberto Firpo was approached by Uruguayan musician Gerardo Matos Rodríguez at a music cafe in Montevideo with sheet music for a new tango. Firpo added arrangements from his own work and recorded it in November "La cumparsita", now considered one of the world's most recognizable tango melodies.

== February 9, 1916 (Wednesday) ==
- Battle for Lake Tanganyika – German steamship Hedwig von Wissmann was sunk by British gunboats HMS Mimi and HMS Toutou in Lake Tanganyika, Central Africa.
- British pilot Harry Hawker flew the Sopwith Pup in its first test run.
- Born: Tex Hughson, American baseball player, pitcher for the Boston Red Sox from 1941 to 1949; as Cecil Carlton Hughson, in Buda, Texas, United States (d. 1993)
- Died: George Richardson, 29, Canadian hockey player and army officer, played left wing for Queen's University, recipient of the Legion of Honour; killed in action in France) (b. 1886)

== February 10, 1916 (Thursday) ==
- Battle of Dogger Bank – The Royal Navy and Imperial German Navy clashed at Dogger Bank for the second time, with German destroyers sinking minesweeper HMS Arabis and killing 56 of her crew.
- Enlisted Canadian servicemen rioted and vandalized two businesses owned and operated by German Canadians in Calgary over two days before the city restored order, following rumors a popular diner had been hiring "illegal aliens" instead of veterans.
- The orchestral composition Symphony No. 1 in F Major by Leevi Madetoja was first performed by the Helsinki Philharmonic Orchestra.
- Born:
  - Edward R. Roybal, American politician, member of Los Angeles City Council from 1949 to 1962, U.S. Representative from California from 1963 to 1993; in Pecos, New Mexico, United States (d. 2005)
  - Achiam, Franco-Israeli sculptor, recipient of the 1965 Grand Prix des Beaux-Arts de la ville de Paris; as Ahiam Shoshany, in Beit-Gan, Galilee (present-day Israel) (d. 2005)

== February 11, 1916 (Friday) ==
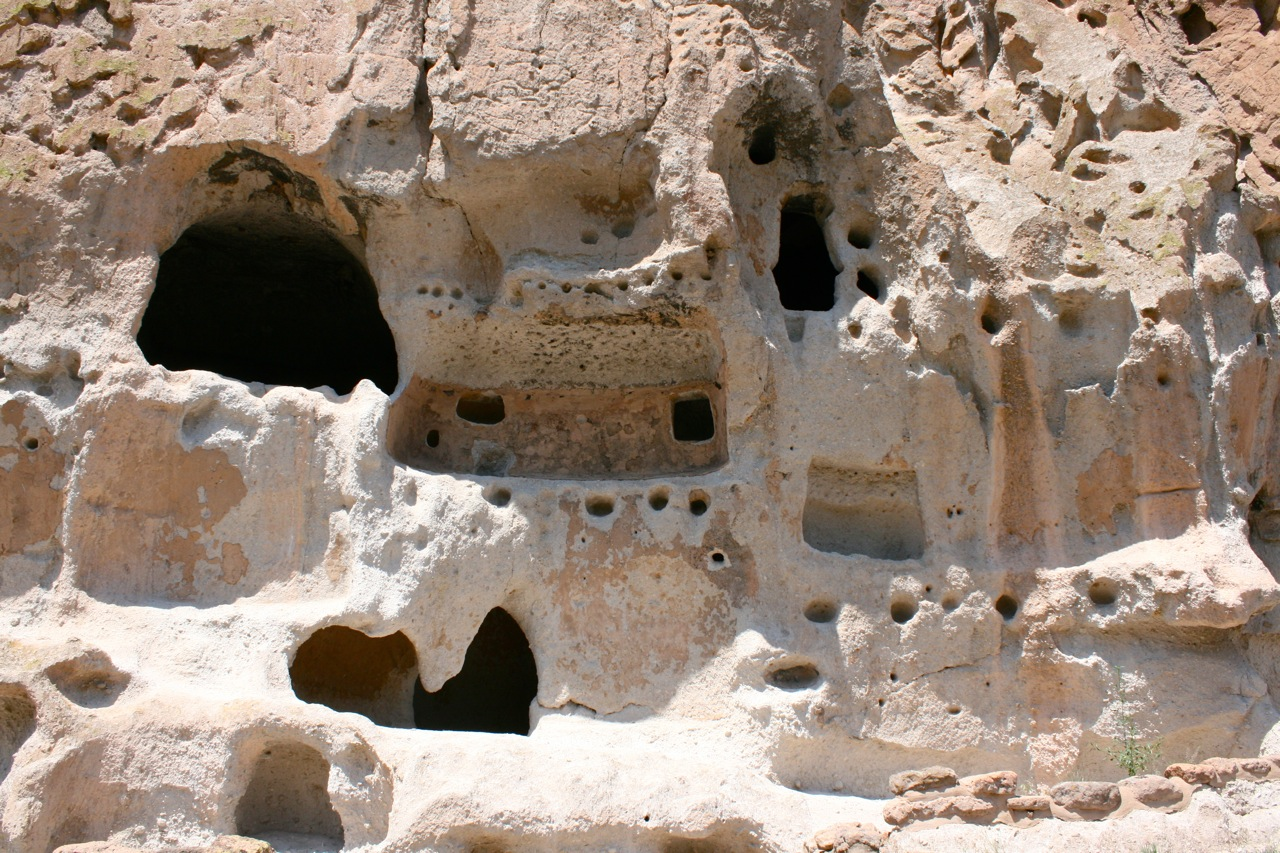
Detail of natural cavities and architectural carving into the soft tuff at Bandelier National Monument in New Mexico.

- Erzurum Offensive – Russian artillery columns moved into range of shelling the Ottoman forts around Erzurum in what is now eastern Turkey.
- Senussi campaign – Senussi supreme leader Ahmed Sharif as-Senussi and 500 men camped at the Bahariya Oasis in North Africa but were forced to move and spotted by recon aircraft.
- Royal Navy light cruiser HMS Arethusa struck a mine and was wrecked in the North Sea, forcing the crew to abandon her.
- The Bandelier National Monument was established in New Mexico in honor of anthropologist Adolph Francis Alphonse Bandelier.
- Emma Goldman was arrested for lecturing on birth control under the Comstock laws, which prohibited the dissemination of any material deemed "obscene".
- The Baltimore Symphony Orchestra presented its first concert under the direction of conductor Gustav Strube.
- The Romanian association football club București was founded in Bucharest as a university sports club for students and staff with programs in football, athletics and tennis. Renowned Romanian mathematician Traian Lalescu was the club's first president.
- Born: Florynce Kennedy, American activist, co-founder of the National Black Feminist Organization; in Kansas City, Missouri, United States (d. 2000)

== February 12, 1916 (Saturday) ==
- Erzurum Offensive – Russian forces captured Fort Kara-gobek at Erzurum, creating panic in the city.
- Battle of Verdun – The Imperial German Army was set to launch a massive offensive against the French at Verdun, France, on this date but bad weather delayed the initial attack for nine days.
- Battle of Salaita Hill – South African and German colonial forces fought the first large-scale battle of the East African Campaign at Traveta in what is now modern-day Kenya. The Allied force of 6,000 was unable to take a strategic hill and sustained 172 casualties.
- Ross Sea party – British polar exploration ship Aurora was momentarily free from the packed ice in the Southern Ocean. It had been drifting in the ice for nearly 10 months since it lost anchor in McMurdo Sound on the Ross Sea near the Antarctic, stranding 10 members of the expedition onshore. Unfortunately, the ice reformed around the ship three days later and the vessel was stuck in the ice for another two weeks before it was finally free.
- British cargo ship SS Leicester struck a mine and sank in the English Channel, with a loss of 17 of her crew.
- The 55th Australian Battalion was established as part of the expansion of the First Australian Imperial Force.
- Born:
  - Joseph Alioto, American politician, 36th Mayor of San Francisco; in San Francisco, United States (d. 1998)
  - Helmut Gröttrup, German electrical engineer, developed the radio guidance system used to control the V-2 rocket; in Cologne, Kingdom of Prussia, German Empire (present-day Germany) (d. 1981)
  - Max Geldray, Dutch jazz musician, best known for his harmonica performances on The Goon Show; as Max van Gelder, in Amsterdam, Netherlands (d. 2004)
- Died:
  - Richard Dedekind, 84, German mathematician, contributed to abstract algebra and the definition of real numbers (b. 1831)
  - John Townsend Trowbridge, 88, American writer, author of The South: A Tour of Its Battlefields and Ruined Cities (b. 1827)

== February 13, 1916 (Sunday) ==
- Erzurum Offensive – Russian forces began to advance on the Ottoman Third Army, which was too small to defend against the assault. Many Ottoman battalions averaged 350 men compared to Russian battalions made up of 1,000 soldiers.
- The 37th Indian Brigade was established as part of the British Army's attempt to relieve defending forces during the Siege of Kut.
- Born:
  - John Reed, British actor and opera singer, lead actor and singer with the D'Oyly Carte Opera Company; in County Durham, England (d. 2010)
  - Jagjit Singh Aurora, Indian army officer, commanding general during the Indo-Pakistani War of 1971; in Kala Gujran, British India (present-day Pakistan) (d. 2005)
  - John Michelosen, American football coach, coached the Pittsburgh Steelers from 1948 to 1951 and Pittsburgh Panthers football club for University of Pittsburgh from 1955 to 1965; in Ambridge, Pennsylvania, United States (d. 1982)
- Died:
  - Vilhelm Hammershøi, 51, Danish painter, known for his realist painting including Interior with Young Woman from Behind and Amalienborg Square, Copenhagen (b. 1864)
  - Harold Bache, 26, English cricketer, played 20 first-class cricket matches, most with the Worcestershire County Cricket Club; killed in action at Ypres Belgium (b. 1889)
  - Fehim Čurčić, 50, Bosnian politician, 5th Mayor of Sarajevo, dignitary to Archduke Franz Ferdinand of Austria on the day he was assassinated on June 28, 1914 (b. 1886)

== February 14, 1916 (Monday) ==
- Erzurum Offensive – Russian forces captured Fort Tafet at Erzurum, forcing Ottoman forces to begin evacuating the city.
- Cochinchina uprising – A revolt among Vietnamese men began on the waterfronts of Saigon and spread to 13 of the 20 provinces of Cochinchina.
- Soldiers of the British Second Army and the German 4th Army fought for control of The Bluff, a strategic mound near St Eloi southeast of the Ypres in Belgium.
- Two Austrian planes dropped bombs on Porta Romana and Porta Volta in Milan.
- Australian troops mutinied against conditions at the Casula Camp in New South Wales. They raided hotels in Liverpool, New South Wales before travelling by train to Sydney, where one soldier was shot dead in a riot at Central Railway station.
- The 53rd and 56th Australian Battalions were established as part of the expansion of the First Australian Imperial Force.
- The fraternity Phi Sigma Pi was established at the State Teachers College at Warrensburg, Missouri (now the University of Central Missouri).
- Born:
  - Marcel Bigeard, French military officer, one of the French commanders in the Battle of Dien Bien Phu; in Toul, France (d. 2010)
  - John L. Goldwater, American publisher, co-founder of Archie Comics; as Max Leonard Goldwasser, in New York City, United States (d. 1999)
  - Masaki Kobayashi, Japanese film director, known for films including The Human Condition, Kwaidan, Harakiri, and Samurai Rebellion; in Otaru, Empire of Japan (present-day Japan) (d. 1996)
  - Edward Platt, American actor, best known for the role of "The Chief" in the 1960s TV spy comedy Get Smart; in Staten Island, New York, United States (d. 1974)

== February 15, 1916 (Tuesday) ==
- Siege of Mora – Brigadier General Frederick Hugh Cunliffe, commander of Allied forces in Central Africa, sent a message to Captain Ernst von Rabe, commander of the German colonial forces at the mountain fortress near Mora in Kamerun (now modern-day Cameroon), offering terms of surrender that included all African native soldiers to be allowed safe passage back to their home villages and all German troops interned in England. Rabe accepted the terms with an additional offer all the native soldiers be paid for their military service.
- Erzurum Offensive – The remaining Ottoman forts around Erzurum were evacuated.
- Cochinchina uprising – An estimated 100 to 300 followers of Phan Xích Long, believing he was Emperor of Vietnam, attempted to break him out of his prison in Saigon, but were put down quickly by French authorities.
- The British were forced off The Bluff by the Germans, although at a cost of 1,294 casualties while the British army sustained 329 casualties.
- Senussi campaign – Aerial reconnaissance located the new main Senussi camp at Agagia in North Africa.
- Royal Navy destroyer HMS Onslow was launched at Fairfield Shipbuilding and Engineering Company at Glasgow. She would take part in the Battle of Jutland five months later.
- The Hunters Point Avenue station opened along the IRT Flushing Line in New York City.
- Born:
  - Dingiri Banda Wijetunga, Sri Lankan state leader, 4th President of Sri Lanka; in Udunuwara Divisional Secretariat, British Ceylon (present-day Sri Lanka) (d. 2008)
  - Mary Jane Croft, American actress, best known as Betty Ramsay on I Love Lucy; in Muncie, Indiana, United States (d. 1999)

== February 16, 1916 (Wednesday) ==
- Erzurum Offensive – Russia captured the city of Erzurum. The Russian column did not effectively pursue the retreating Ottoman Third Army, allowing them to set up a new defense line less than 10 km away from the city. The Ottoman Empire lost 17,000 soldiers, including 10,000 casualties and 5,000 prisoners. The Russian Empire sustained 9,000 casualties, including 1,000 dead, 4,000 wounded and 4,000 affected with frostbite.
- The 54th Australian Battalion was established as part of the expansion of the First Australian Imperial Force.
- The village of Lomond, Alberta was established.
- Born:
  - Dương Văn Minh, Vietnamese state leader, last President of South Vietnam; in French Cochinchina, French Indochina (present-day Tiền Giang province, Vietnam) (d. 2001)
  - Kermit Roosevelt Jr., American intelligence officer, specialized in Middle East intelligence for the Central Intelligence Agency, grandson of U.S. President Theodore Roosevelt; in Buenos Aires, Argentina (d. 2000)

== February 17, 1916 (Thursday) ==
- Ross Sea party – The sledging party of the second arm of the Imperial Trans-Antarctic Expedition was halted during their return trek from Mount Hope near the Beardmore Glacier where they had laid down a depot for the first arm of the expedition. The hostile weather left them stranded for five days until supplies ran out. Two of the members of the party, expedition leader Aeneas Mackintosh and Arnold Spencer-Smith, had taken ill and had to be left behind in the tent under care of Ernest Wild, brother to Frank Wild of the expedition party under Ernest Shackleton, while the others slogged to get more supplies.
- The 58th Australian Battalion was established as part of the expansion of the First Australian Imperial Force.
- The musical Robinson Crusoe, Jr. by Edgar Smith, with lyrics by Harold R. Atteridge and music by Sigmund Romberg, premiered at the Winter Garden Theatre on Broadway in New York City. The musical in particular was styled and arranged for popular singer Al Jolson.
- Born:
  - Dick Farrelly, Irish songwriter, best known for "Isle of Innisfree"; as Richard Farrelly, in Kells, County Meath, Ireland (d. 1990)
  - Geoffrey Fisken, New Zealand fighter pilot, leading fighter ace for the British Commonwealth in the Pacific Theater during World War II, recipient of the Distinguished Flying Cross; in Gisborne, New Zealand (d. 2011)
  - Don Tallon, Australian cricketer, wicket-keeper for Queensland cricket team from 1933 to 1953 and Australia national cricket team from 1946 to 1953; in Bundaberg, Australia (d. 1984)
- Died: Helen Farnsworth Mears, 43, American sculptor, member of the White Rabbits female group of sculptors for the World's Columbian Exposition; died of heart disease (b. 1872)

== February 18, 1916 (Friday) ==
- Siege of Mora – The German colonial force of 155 men at the mountain fortress near Mora in German Cameroon surrendered after a year and a half under siege by Allied forces. The surrender effectively ended the Kamerun campaign, as most of the remaining German troops escaped into neighboring Spanish Guinea weeks before under orders of German colonial commander Carl Heinrich Zimmermann.
- An election on the Hong Kong sanitary board was held to fill a seat vacated after board member Gerard H. L. Fitzwilliams resigned in January., with 24-year old F. M. G. Ozorio elected as the youngest citizen ever to the board.
- The 57th Australian Battalion was established as part of the expansion of the First Australian Imperial Force.
- Hans Schmidt, a Roman Catholic priest in New York City was executed by hanging at Sing Sing prison for the murder of housekeeper Anna Aumüller, whom he had a secret affair with. He was only priest ever to be executed in the United States.
- Born:
  - Maria Altmann, Austrian-American Holocaust survivor and heiress, best known for her lawsuit against the Government of Austria to recover family-owned artwork by Gustav Klimt that had been stolen by the Nazis; as Maria Victoria Bloch, in Vienna, Austria-Hungary (present-day Austria) (d. 2011)
  - Jean Drapeau, Canadian politician, 37th Mayor of Montreal; in Montreal, Canada (d. 1999)

== February 19, 1916 (Saturday) ==
- East River tunnel blowout: During the construction of a subway tunnel under the East River to Brooklyn Heights, New York City, two sandhogs were killed in an accident when a compressed air pocket burst out of its chamber. A third man, 28-year-old Marshall Mabey, survived being blown through the riverbed for 12 feet (3.7 m), up through the river and to the top of a 25-foot (7.6 m) waterspout. He would continue working as a sandhog for 25 years.
- Born: Eddie Arcaro, American jockey, only American rider to win the Triple Crown of Thoroughbred Racing twice; as George Edward Arcaro, in Cincinnati, United States (d. 1997)
- Died:
  - Ernst Mach, 78, Austrian physicist, leading researcher into shock waves in which the Mach number to measure velocity is named after him (b. 1838)
  - John Winthrop Hackett, 67, Australian news publisher, co-founder of The West Australian daily newspaper and first chancellor of the University of Western Australia (b. 1848)

== February 20, 1916 (Sunday) ==
- The Erie Philharmonic held its last concert in Erie, Pennsylvania before disbanding, but would reform again in 1921.
- Born: Jean Erdman, American dancer and choreographer, recipient of the Tony Award for Best Choreography for The Two Gentlemen of Verona; in Honolulu, Territory of Hawaii, United States (now Hawaii) (d. 2020)
- Died: Klas Pontus Arnoldson, 71, Swedish writer and pacifist, recipient of the Nobel Peace Prize and founding member of the Swedish Peace and Arbitration Society (b. 1844)

== February 21, 1916 (Monday) ==
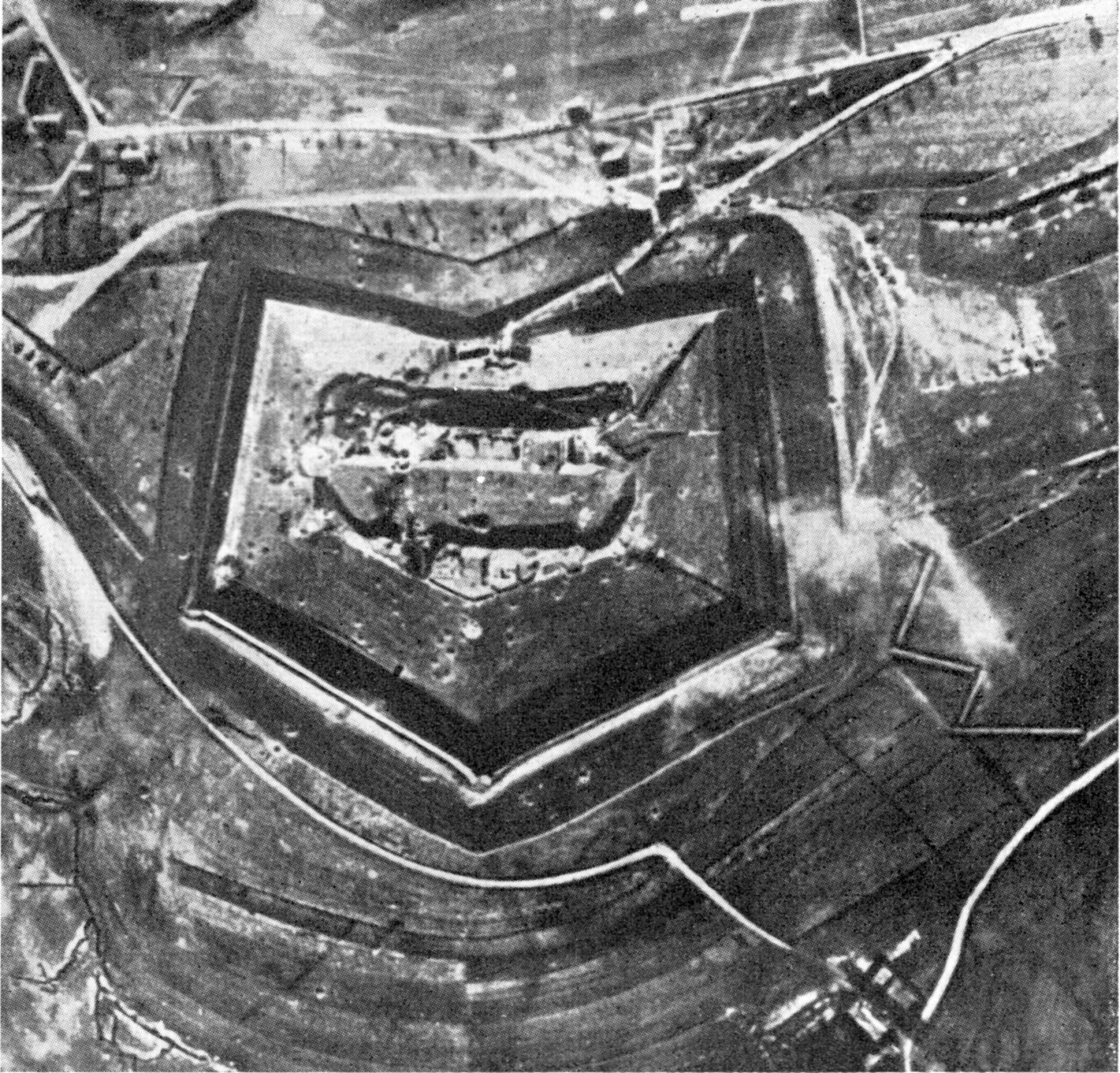
Fort Douaumont before the Germans assaulted it at the start of the Battle of Verdun

- Battle of Verdun – The Imperial German Army launched one of the biggest offenses of World War I, mobilizing 1.25 million soldiers in 50 divisions to assault and break the French line at Verdun, France, which was being defended by 1.14 million French soldiers. The fearsome army and aerial assault involved using storm troopers for the first time, slinging hand grenades or using flamethrowers to destroy French defenses as opposed to firing their rifles.
- Italian hospital ship HS Marechiaro was torpedoed and sunk by German submarine SM UC-12 near the Albanian port of Durrës, killing 33 people.
- To support the morale of French troops defending against the German offensive at Verdun, French fighter pilot Jean Navarre began daily aerobatic flights over the front line in a Nieuport fighter with its fuselage painted in French red, white, and blue.
- The 59th Australian Battalion was established as part of the expansion of the First Australian Imperial Force.
- Died: Richard Murphy, 77, American mariner, his boat command exploits were well chronicled in The Fisherman's Own Book (b. 1838)

== February 22, 1916 (Tuesday) ==
- Battle of Verdun – German forces advanced 5 km (3.1 mi) past the French to the edge of the village of Flabas, France, with only light casualties. Two French battalions led by Colonel Émile Driant tried to hold the line but were pushed back to the village of Samogneux where he was killed.
- Cochinchina uprising – French colonial authorities executed Vietnamese revolutionary Phan Xích Long following an attempted prison breakout days earlier. The uprising was put down around the same time with 51 dissidents executed and hundreds more imprisoned.
- The 1st, 2nd and 3rd Dismounted Brigades were formed to become part of the British Western Frontier Force in Egypt using elements of the Eastern Mounted Brigade, Highland Mounted Brigade, Lowland Mounted Brigade, Scottish Horse Mounted Brigade, South Eastern Mounted Brigade and the 2nd South Western Mounted Brigade.

== February 23, 1916 (Wednesday) ==
- Battle of Verdun – The Germans repulsed a French counterattack but managed to hold on to the village of Samogneux, France.
- The 41st Indian Brigade was established to serve in the Mesopotamian campaign.
- The McKinley Birthplace Memorial gold dollar was created by an act of the United States Congress in commemoration for late U.S. President William McKinley.
- The Spanish opera The Wild Cat by Manuel Penella premiered at Teatro Principal in Valencia, Spain.
- Born: Retta Scott, American animator, first woman to receive screen credit as an animator at the Walt Disney Animation Studios; in Omak, Washington, United States (d. 1990)
- Died: Hugo von Pohl, 60, German naval officer, Chief of the German Imperial Admiralty Staff from 1913 to 1916 (b. 1855)

== February 24, 1916 (Thursday) ==
- Battle of Verdun – The Germans captured the village of Beaumont-en-Verdunois, France, and were set up to assault the strategic significant Fort Douaumont.
- The National Union Government formed in Luxembourg during German occupation following the resignation of Hubert Loutsch as Prime Minister of Luxembourg. Victor Thorn then took leadership of the country, on condition the occupying Germans would not interfere with government while Luxembourg did not support the Allies.
- The 60th Australian Battalion was established as part of the expansion of the First Australian Imperial Force.
- St. Joseph's College was established in New York City and expanded to a second campus on Long Island, New York.
- Born:
  - Jaime Sarlanga, Argentine association football player, played forward for the Boca Juniors from 1940 to 1948 and the Argentina national football team; in Tigre, Buenos Aires, Argentina (d. 1966)
  - Tim Walenn, British pilot, member of the Royal Air Force during World War II and escapee from Stalag Luft III (known as the master forger of the group); as Gilbert William Walenn, in Hendon, London, England (executed, 1944)

== February 25, 1916 (Friday) ==
- Battle of Verdun – A German party was able to scale and capture Fort Douaumont.
- Born: Kurt Welter, German air force officer, commander of the Nachtjagdgeschwader 11 wing of the Luftwaffe during World War II, recipient of the Knight's Cross of the Iron Cross; in Lindenthal, Cologne, German Empire (present-day Germany) (killed in a car accident, 1949)
- Died:
  - David Bowman, 55, Australian politician, Leader of the Opposition in Queensland from 1908 to 1912 for the Australian Labor Party (b. 1860)
  - John St. John, 83, American politician, 8th Governor of Kansas (b. 1833)

== February 26, 1916 (Saturday) ==
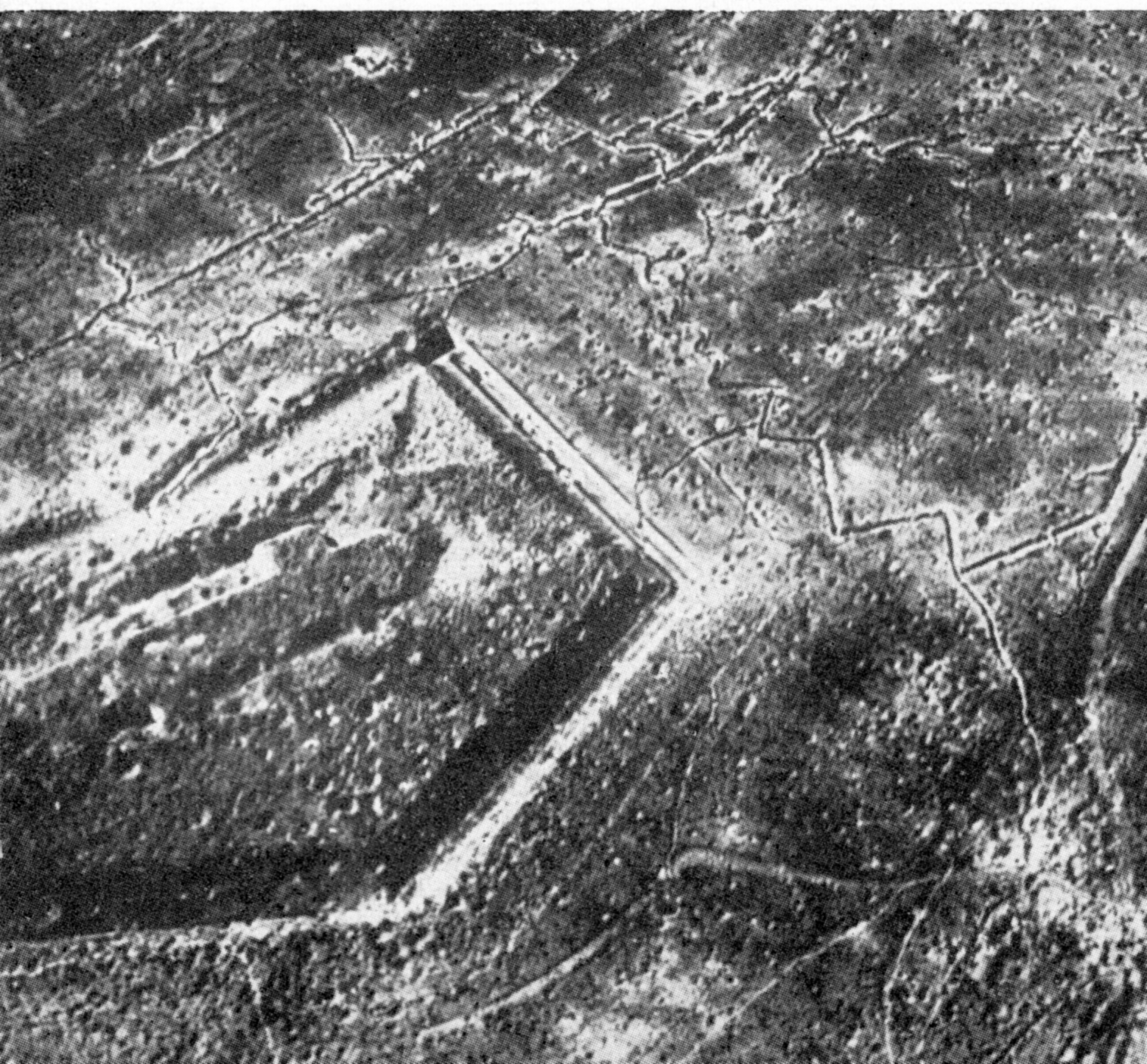
Fort Douaumont after fighting ended during the Battle of Verdun

- Battle of Verdun – The French failed to retake Fort Douaumont, forcing General Philippe Pétain to call off further attacks and have defenses consolidated around the remaining forts. The Germans had advanced 3 km (1.9 mi) on a 10-kilometre (6.2 mi) front; French losses were 24,000 men and German losses were c. 25,000 men..
- Action of Agagia – British forces in North Africa fought Senussi militia backed by the Central Powers east of the Egyptian port town of Sidi Barrani. The British force of 1,400 defeated a Senussi force estimated at between 1,500 and 1,600. The Senussi lost an estimated 500 men and horses while the British sustained 47 killed and 137 wounded.
- French ocean liner turned auxiliary cruiser SS La Provence II was sunk by German submarine SM U-35 while transporting French troops, killing 990 out of the 1,732 passengers and crew on board.
- French air force pilot Jean Navarre induced a German two-seat aircraft to land in French-held territory and surrender without ever firing a shot merely by appearing behind them over the Verdun battlefield. Later that morning, Navarre shot down a German bomber for his fifth victory.
- No. 40 Squadron of the Royal Flying Corps was established and became noted for using Australian and Canadian fighter pilots.
- The 50th and 51st Australian Battalions were established as part of the expansion of the First Australian Imperial Force.
- Born:
  - Jackie Gleason, American comedian, actor and musician, best known for the 1950s TV sitcom hit The Honeymooners and films The Hustler and Smokey and the Bandit; as Herbert John Gleason, in New York City, United States (d. 1987)
  - Preacher Roe, American baseball player, pitcher for the St. Louis Cardinals, Pittsburgh Pirates, and Brooklyn Dodgers from 1938 to 1954; as Elwin Charles Roe, in Ash Flat, Arkansas, United States (d. 2008)
  - Joan Curran, Welsh scientist, member of the Manhattan Project, inventor of the chaff used to screen aircraft on radar; as Joan Elizabeth Strothers, in Swansea, Wales (d. 1999)
  - Fang Yi, Chinese politician, Vice Premier of the People's Republic of China from 1978 to 1982; in Xiamen, Republic of China (present-day China) (d. 1997)
- Died: Tomasa Ortiz Real, 73, Spanish nun, founder of the Salesian Sisters of the Sacred Heart, beatified by Pope John Paul II in 2004 (b. 1842)

== February 27, 1916 (Sunday) ==
- Battle of Verdun – The spring thaw turned the ground to swamp and slowed German advances, allowing French time to regroup. German soldiers began suffering from exhaustion and lost 500 soldiers to one day of fighting around the village of Douaumont, France.
- As a result of losing Erzurum, Turkey to Russia, Ottoman General Mahmud Kâmil Pasha was relieved of command of the Ottoman Third Army and replaced with General Wehib Pasha.
- British passenger ship SS Maloja struck a mine and sank in the English Channel off Dover with the loss of 155 lives.
- The 49th Australian Battalion was established as part of the expansion of the First Australian Imperial Force.

== February 28, 1916 (Monday) ==
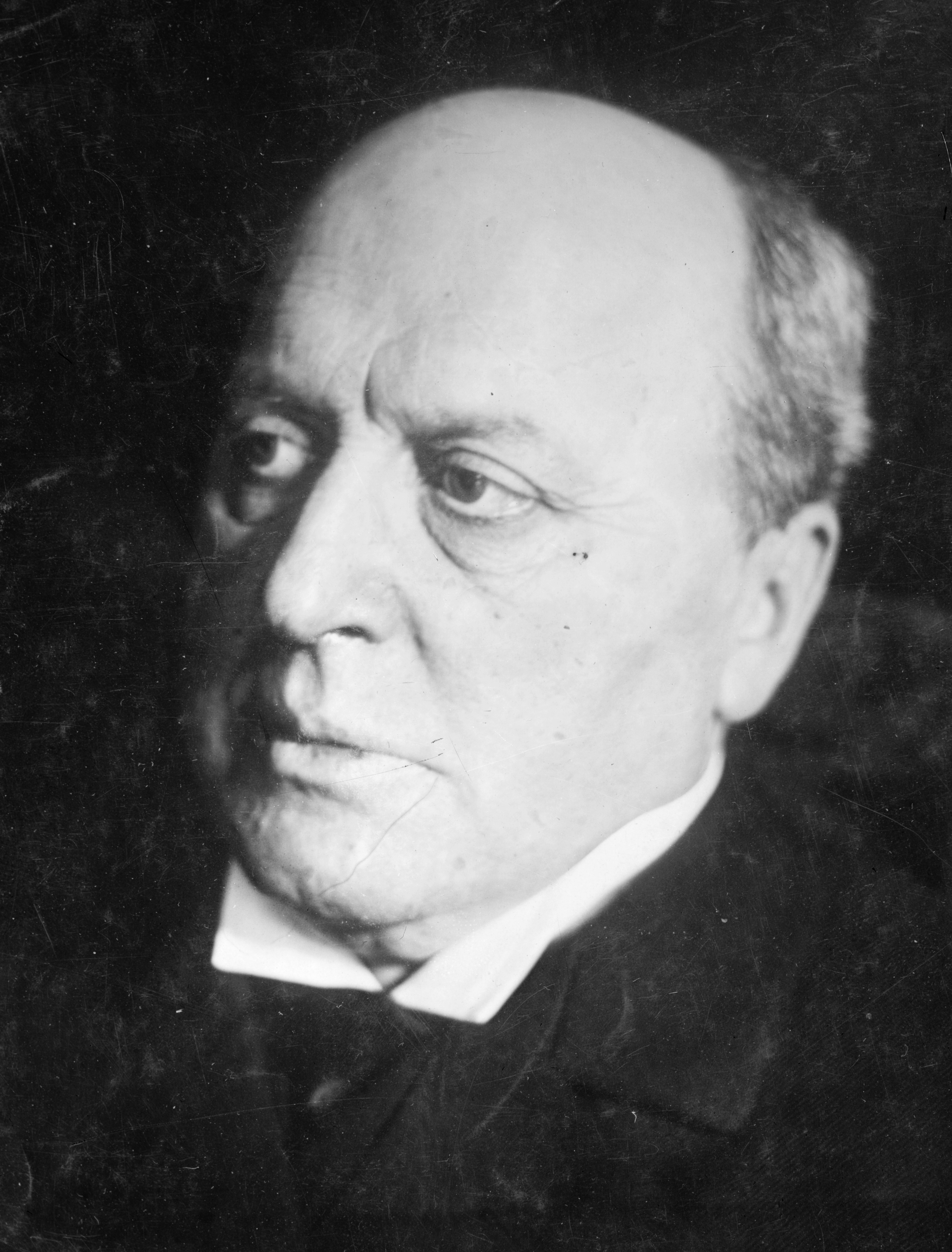
Henry James

- Senussi campaign – British forces were able to take the Egyptian port town of Sidi Barrani with no resistance.
- A general election was held for the Faroe Islands, with the Union Party winning half of the electoral seats.
- The Gulf Coast Lines rail company was established in New Orleans to handle coastal railways in Louisiana and Texas.
- Born: Cesar Climaco, Filipino politician, mayor of Zamboanga City and prominent critic of Ferdinand Marcos; in Zamboanga City, Philippine Islands (present-day Philippines) (assassinated, 1984)
- Died:
  - Henry James, 72, American-British writer, author of The Turn of the Screw, The Wings of the Dove and The Portrait of a Lady (b. 1843)
  - Gregorio Cortez, 40, American farmer and outlaw, became a folk hero among Mexican-Americans for evading arrest for 10 days following a shooting Cortez argued had been in self-defense and later exonerated for (b. 1875)

== February 29, 1916 (Tuesday) ==
- Battle of Verdun – The Germans were further delayed by a sudden snowstorm, allowing the French time to bring 90,000 men and 23,000 short tons (21,000 t) of ammunition by rail from Bar-le-Duc, France, to Verdun.
- The German auxiliary cruiser SMS Greif was intercepted and attacked by four Royal Navy ships in the North Sea, including RMS Alcantara and HMS Comus, after it broke through the Allies naval blockade. Greif sank Alcantara thanks to superior firepower when the smaller ship got too close, killing 72 British sailors before it was destroyed by the other three ships. In total, 220 out of the 360 crew on Greif were captured and another 130 were killed.
- Born:
  - Dinah Shore, American singer, best known for popular hits in 1940s and 1950s including "Baby, It's Cold Outside" and "Buttons and Bows"; as Frances Rose Shore, in Winchester, Tennessee, United States (d. 1994)
  - James B. Donovan, American lawyer, member of the diplomat legal team that negotiated the release of U.S. Air Force pilot Francis Gary Powers from Soviet custody; in New York City, United States (d. 1970)
  - Ruth Mary Reynolds, American activist, promoter of the independence of Puerto Rico; in Lawrence County, South Dakota, United States (d. 1989)
  - Leonard Shoen, American businessperson, founder of U-Haul; in McGrath, Minnesota, United States (d. 1999)
- Died: Florence Annie Conybeare, 43, British suffragist, noted member of the Women's Liberal Federation (b. 1872)
