= L 9 =

LZ 36 / L 9
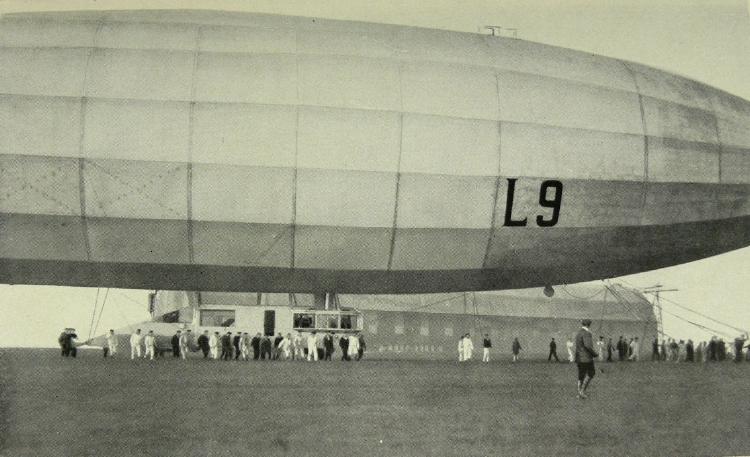
- Airship L 9 (LZ 36)

General information
- Type: Reconnaissance/bomber airship
- Manufacturer: German Empire Luftschiffbau Zeppelin
- Status: Lost (hangar fire)
- Primary user: German Empire Kaiserliche Marine
- Number built: 1

History
- Introduction date: 1915
- First flight: 8 March 1915
- Retired: Destroyed 16 September 1916
- Developed from: Zeppelin Type O class

L 9 (factory number LZ 36) was a German airship built by Luftschiffbau Zeppelin in Friedrichshafen for the German Imperial German Navy and made its first flight on 8 March 1915. It was a transitional model in the O-class. With 74 missions scouting for British navy in the North Sea, LZ 36 is considered to be "one of the more successful Zeppelins.

The airship was mostly stationed in Hage, East Frisia, and was nearly shot down over the North Sea on 25 April 1916. In July 1916, it was stationed at the Tønder airship base. On 16 September 1916, both L 6 and L 9 were destroyed in a hangar fire in Fuhlsbüttel under unclear circumstances involving gas refueling.

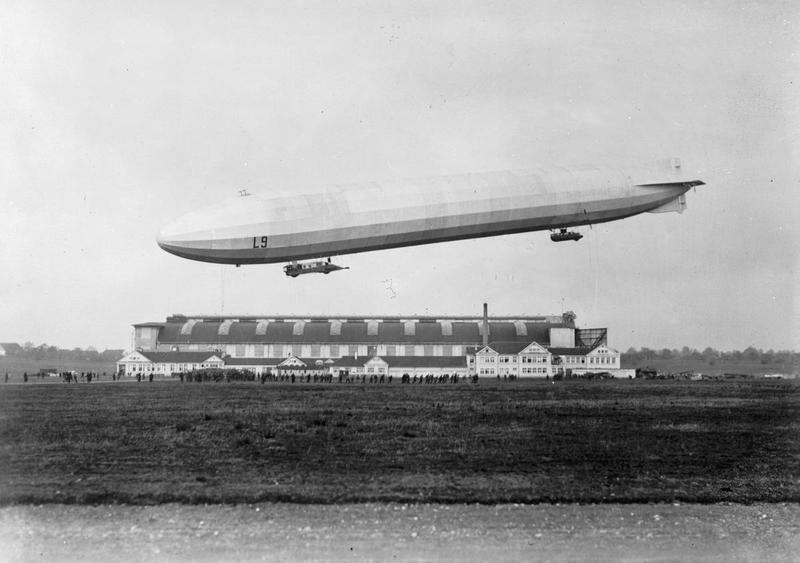
Airship L 9 / LZ 36

== Commanders and First Officers ==
L 9 was stationed at various locations including Nordholz near Cuxhaven, Hage in East Frisia, Tønder, Seddin near Stolp (now Słupsk), and Fuhlsbüttel near Hamburg. In addition to four bombing raids, it conducted 74 reconnaissance missions.

- 15 March 1915: Kapitänleutnant Heinrich Mathy appointed as commander with Oberleutnant zur See Friemel as first officer. Stationed in Nordholz from 18 March and Hage from 10 April, where the airship remained for 14½ months. Mathy later died jumping from L 31 after it was shot down over Potters Bar, north of London on 2 October 1916.
- 24 June 1915: Kapitänleutnant Odo Löwe appointed commander, with Leutnant zur See Braunhof as first officer.
- 19 October 1915: Kapitänleutnant Martin Dietrich appointed commander, with Leutnant zur See Eisenbeck as first officer.
- 22 December 1915: Kapitänleutnant Eduard Prölß appointed commander, with Leutnant zur See Brand as first officer. See also L 37.
- 27 March 1916: Hauptmann August Stelling appointed commander, with Leutnant zur See Schüz as first officer.
- 10 June 1916: Kapitänleutnant Hermann Kraushaar and Leutnant zur See Ernst Zimmermann took command. Transferred from Hage to Tønder airship base on 2 July and completed 14 missions.
- 14 July 1916: Kapitänleutnant Wilhelm Ganzel and Leutnant zur See Richard Frey took command. Transferred to Seddin on 3 August and conducted 6 missions.
- 8 August 1916: Kapitänleutnant Hollender and Leutnant zur See Richard Frey stationed in Seddin.
- 8 September 1916: Kapitänleutnant Gayer and Leutnant zur See Loewisch stationed in Fuhlsbüttel.

== History ==
=== Mathy's Bombing of Blyth, Northumberland – 14 April 1915 ===
On 14 April 1915, Heinrich Mathy flew L 9 from Hage, west of Jutland and Norway, toward North East England, reaching Blyth, Northumberland around 19:30. The airship dropped bombs targeting coal facilities, but they mostly hit fields and caused minimal damage. The incendiaries were quickly extinguished. Aircraft were dispatched but failed to locate the zeppelin.

=== Mathy’s Encounters with Submarines – May 1915 ===
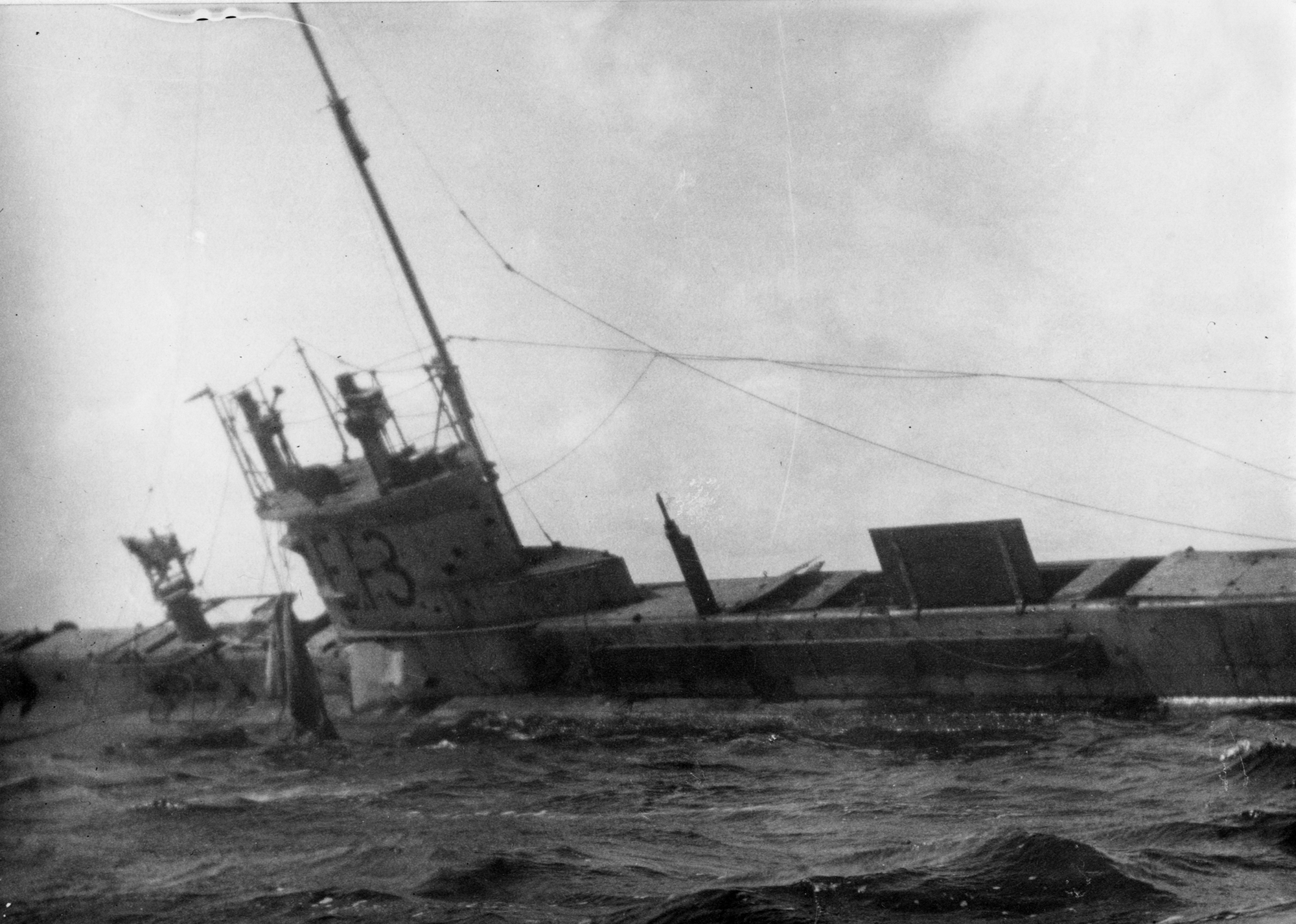
In May 1915, L 9 encountered HMS E13, which later ran aground at Saltholm

On 3 May 1915, Mathy spotted four British submarines while on reconnaissance. Three submerged quickly, but HMS E5 exchanged fire before diving. Later, L 9 attacked HMS E4 with bombs, but it escaped unscathed.

HMS E13 later engaged L 9, which responded with bombs and forced it to dive. Later in August, E13 ran aground near Saltholm and was destroyed by German torpedo boats SMS G 132 and SMS G 134, killing half the crew.

=== Mathy's Bombings near Hull – June 1915 ===
L 9, under Mathy's command, launched two raids in June 1915 against Kingston upon Hull from Hage.

==== North of Hull – 4/5 June 1915 ====
L 9 dropped incendiary and high-explosive bombs near Kilham and Langtoft. Fog hindered navigation to Hull, and the airship returned while under coastal fire.

==== Hull – 6/7 June 1915 ====
Two days later, L 9 bombed Hull with 13 HE and 50 incendiary bombs, killing 24 and injuring 40. Damage centered around Holy Trinity Church, Market Place, and High Street.

=== Löwe's Bombing of Goole – 9 August 1915 ===
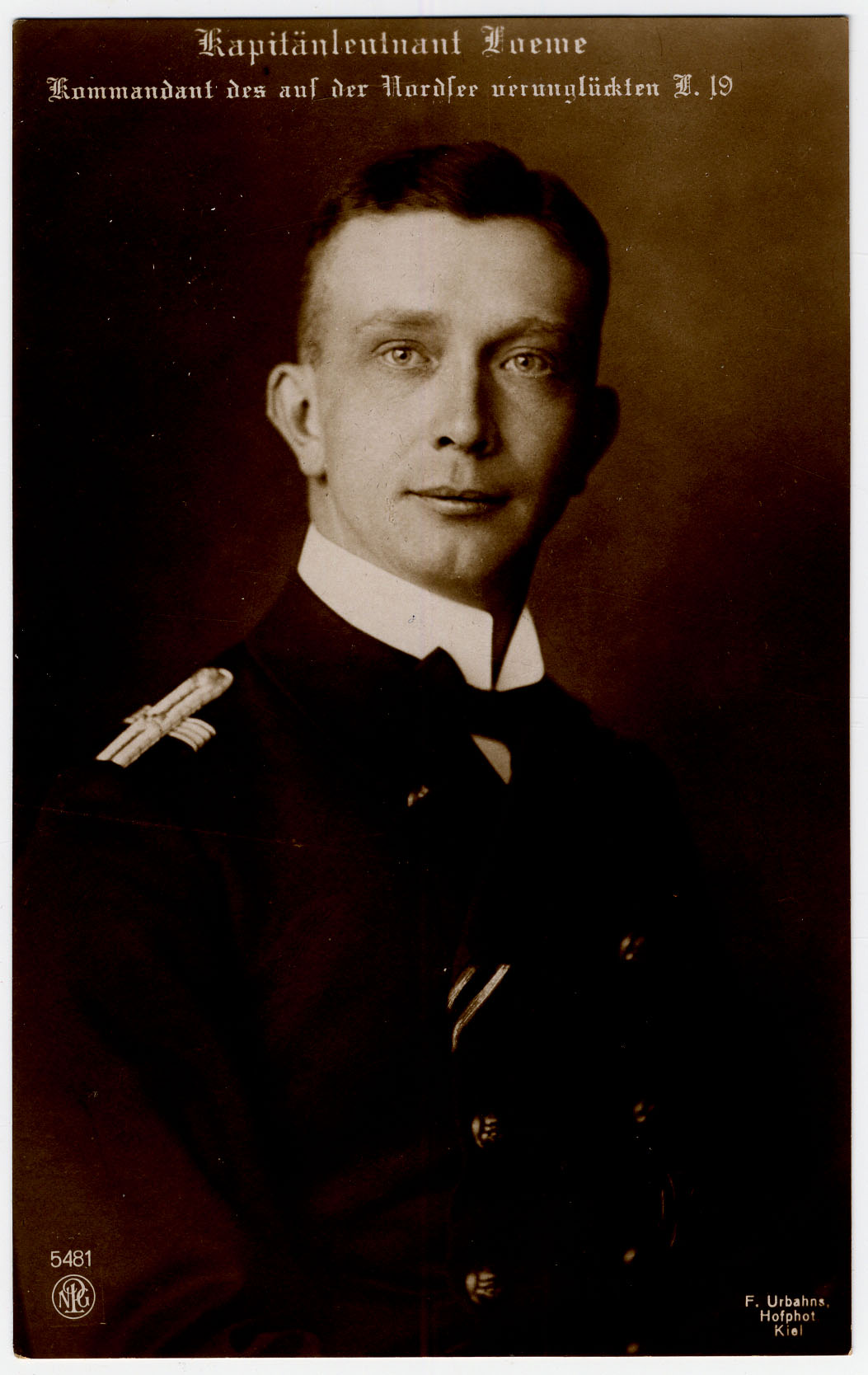
Odo Löwe later commanded L 19

On the night of 9–10 August 1915, Odo Löwe was diverted from Hull and bombed Goole instead, dropping 8 explosive and 13 incendiary bombs. Sixteen were killed, including Sarah Acaster and her daughters.

=== Bombing of Skinningrove – 8 September 1915 ===
L 9 bombed the steelworks in Skinningrove, North Yorkshire. A bomb landed between two buildings storing benzol and TNT but caused no detonation. Three RNAS fighters failed to intercept.

=== Stelling’s Reconnaissance – 25 April 1916 ===
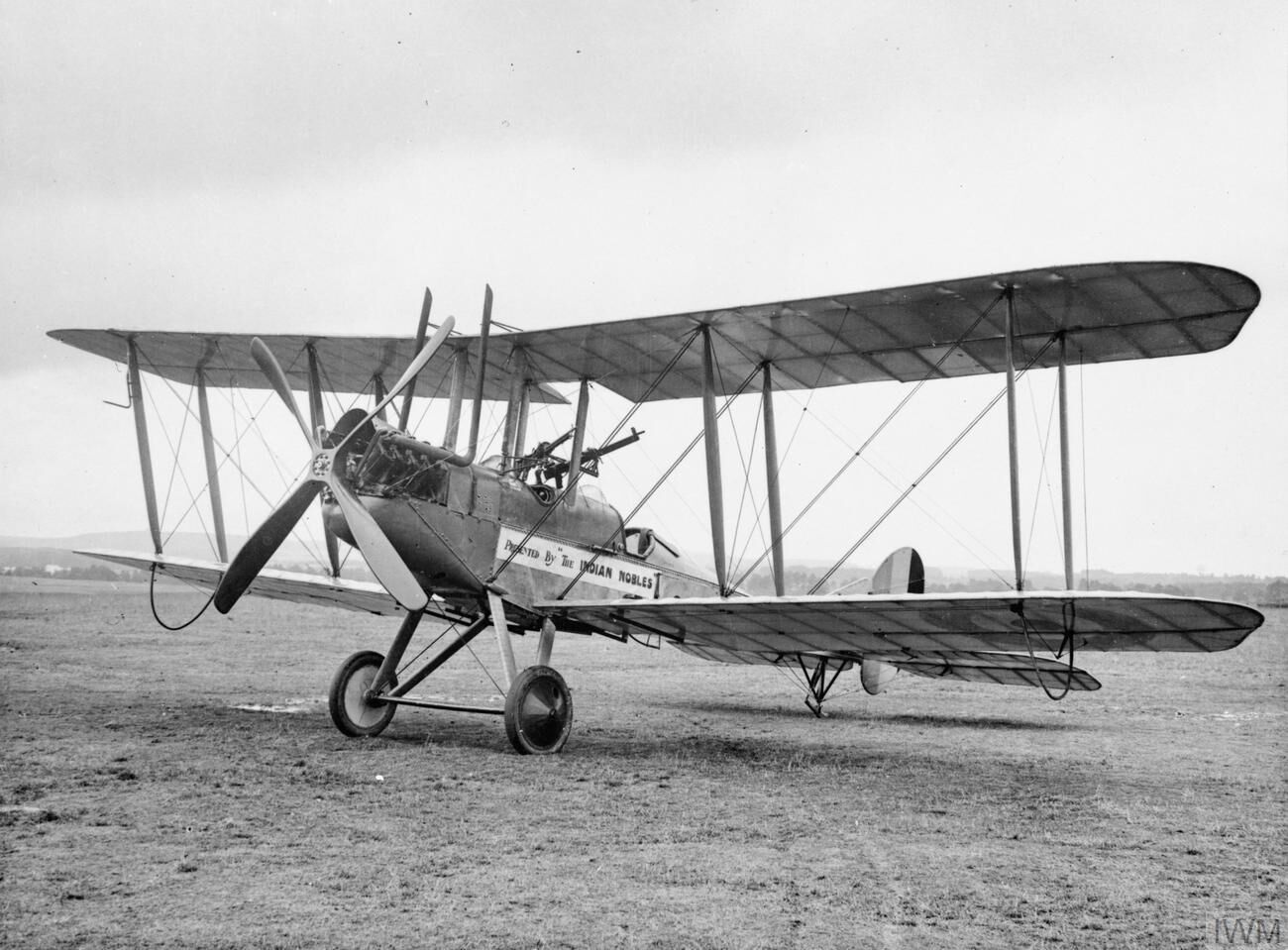
L 9 was attacked by RAF B.E.2c aircraft with Ranken darts

During the bombardment of Yarmouth and Lowestoft, L 9 was spotted 40 miles offshore and pursued by B.E.2c aircraft using Ranken darts. Though hit, L 9 returned safely.

=== Battle of Jutland - 31 May 1916 ===
L 9 was one of four airships intended to reconnoitre ahead of the High Seas Fleet in a planned bombardment of Sunderland, with the intention of drawing out a part of the British Grand Fleet. Bad weather grounded the Zeppelins, causing the plan to be amended to a foray into the Skagerrak. On the morning of 31 May, the weather improved permitting the launch of the four airships, but the Battle of Jutland had already commenced by the time they had crossed the coast, and mist and low cloud prevented any useful observation.

=== Stationed in Tønder – July to August 1916 ===
On 2 July 1916, under Hermann Kraushaar, L 9 moved to the Tønder Airship Base, conducting missions until transferred to Seddin on 3 August under Wilhelm Ganzel.

=== L 6 and L 9 Destroyed in Fuhlsbüttel – 16 September 1916 ===
On 16 September 1916, L 6 and L 9 were destroyed by a fire during hydrogen refueling. The fire tore through L 6 and ignited both airships. The cause was never confirmed, though static discharge from rust particles was suggested by commander Peter Strasser.

== Sources ==
- Carradice, Phil (2017-09-09). The Zeppelin: An Illustrated History. Fonthill Media.
