= 1916 Cochinchina uprising =

Civil disorder in Vietnam

1916 Cochinchina Uprising
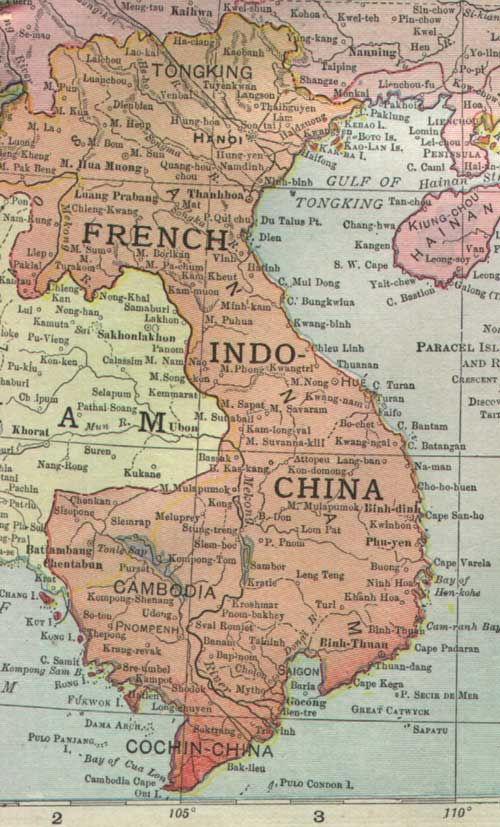
- French Indochina in 1916.
- Location: French Indochina
- Result: Rebellion suppressed by French

The 1916 Cochinchina uprising (Vietnamese: Phong trào hội kín Nam Kỳ) was a series of defiant protests and attempted revolts in February against the French authority of southern Vietnam, which had been the colony of Cochinchina since 1862.

The organization and motivation of the uprisings were unclear, since many different organizations of Vietnamese revolutionaries with different ideologies were involved. Some were supporters of the mystic and geomancer Phan Xich Long, who had claimed to be a descendant of the boy Emperor Hàm Nghi, who had been deposed by the French for attempting a revolt with the aim of securing independence some three decades earlier. Long had been imprisoned three years earlier after declaring himself Emperor and attempting to storm Saigon with the help some purported magic potion to restore the monarchy. Long's supporters sought his release from jail. There were also a loose alliance of secret organizations from the provinces in the Mekong Delta region. The centre of the planning appeared to be the Nui Cam Pagoda in Châu Đốc, while many participants also appeared to have been sympathisers and affiliates of Prince Cường Để, who was living in exile. Cường Để was a direct descendant of Emperor Gia Long, who founded the Nguyễn dynasty in 1802. Cường Để was a descendant of Gia Long's eldest son Prince Cảnh, but Canh died of smallpox before his father, so the succession passed to Emperor Minh Mạng and his descendants. A later report from the Governor General of French Indochina to the French Minister of Colonies asserted that Cường Để was the "chef occulte" of the rising, through the actions of his "most loyal partisans and most active agents in Cochinchina".

The centrepiece of the plot was to seize the central prison of Saigon, in order to facilitate the release of Phan Xich Long and many other revolutionaries who had been imprisoned. This would also have provided access to the French armoury and their firearms, which would have given an upgrade to the firepower of the Vietnamese, who were armed with spears and machetes. The prison was also viewed among the populace as a symbol of the hated French colonial rule, so its capture was intended to provide a psychological boost to foment the general public into joining the uprising.

On February 14, 1916, around three hundred men landed at Saigon's waterfront and began to move in groups towards the penitentiary, shouting slogans as they marched. However, some of the groups came across police patrols, and retreated back towards the piers after being fired upon with pistols. The groups that did reach the prison found the gates securely protected, and retreated chaotically. Ten of Long's men were killed, whereas only one sentry perished. The French arrested 65 rebels on the spot. Despite the failure to capture the jail, many areas in the Mekong Delta proceeded with their planned actions against the French.

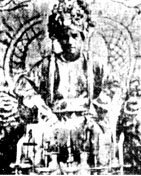
Phan Xich Long

At Bien Hoa, on the northern outskirts of Saigon, a revolt was attempted at the local jail. In Thủ Dầu Một, another town northwest of Saigon, a march towards Saigon was planned, but was quickly dispersed by the authorities. At Bến Tre to the south in the Mekong Delta, a march by villagers resulted in the burning and destruction of the local archives and registers offices. After French authorities broke up the march, the participants retreated and began to attack any Vietnamese collaborators that they could lay their hands on. At Vũng Tàu, a port town to the southeast of Saigon, an armed group made a failed attempt to seize the military post. In Vĩnh Long in the delta, the Nghia Hoa society led a protest march to the office of the local French administrator, while a group that had come north from Cần Thơ with the intention of joining them was forcibly dispersed before reaching their destination. A bomb was uncovered in Mỹ Tho, while the town of Long Xuyên in the far south saw ransackings and kidnappings for ransom. In the town of Tây Ninh, on the western border with Cambodia, an armed rebel unit led by the self-proclaimed General Vuong Van Le briefly patrolled the surrounding areas.

The French community in Cochinchina was taken aback by the revolt that had occurred and demanded a strong response from the colonial authorities. Hundreds of Vietnamese were quickly apprehended, and summary justice was dispensed by a French War Council. Eventually, 51 people were put to death and an unknown number of dissidents were jailed. Despite some criticism back in France about the severity of the reaction, the local authorities prevailed in implementing their strong response.
