= Zeppelin LZ 54 =

Imperial German Navy airship (1915–16)

LZ 54
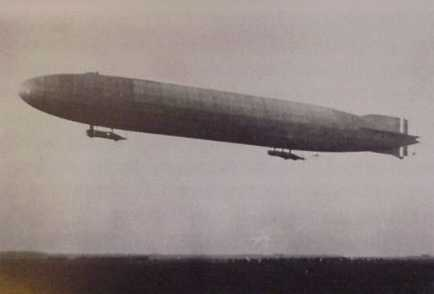

General information
- Type: Rigid airship
- Class: P-class Zeppelin
- National origin: German Empire
- Operator: Imperial German Navy
- Built by: Luftschiffbau Zeppelin
- Construction number: LZ 54
- Serial: L 19
- Flights: 14

History
- First flight: 27 November 1915
- Last flight: 1 February 1916
- Fate: Crashed in the North Sea

Zeppelin LZ 54, given the military tactical designation L 19, was a Zeppelin of the Imperial German Navy. While returning from her first bombing raid on the United Kingdom in early 1916, she came down in the North Sea. Its crew survived the crash, but drowned after the crew of a British fishing trawler King Stephen refused to rescue them, citing fears that the Germans would overpower them. The incident received worldwide publicity and divided British public opinion; it was also used in German propaganda.

== Background ==
LZ 54 was one of 22 P-class military Zeppelins built by Luftschiffbau Zeppelin for the Imperial German Army and Navy as improved versions of the pre-war, M-class airship, with larger gas volume and more power, having four instead of three engines. These were initially 180 horsepower (134 kW) Maybach C-X engines; later replaced with the 240 horsepower (179 kW) Maybach HSLu. LZ 54 had two gondolas, a control cabin forward with a single engine and rear gondola mounting the other three engines. The P-class Zeppelins were around 10 miles per hour (16 km/h) faster than the earlier craft, and had a higher service ceiling, double the payload and over double the range.

A bomb load of 1,600 kilograms (3,530 lb) could be carried and a number of MG 08 machine guns were mounted for aircraft defence. The number of guns varied – army Zeppelins carried more as they operated over land and enemy aircraft were a greater threat, navy Zeppelins carried fewer to save weight. The guns were mounted in the two gondolas under the airship, in a tail gun position, and on a dorsal gun platform on the top of the envelope. This upper platform could accommodate three guns and their gunners. The airship's normal complement was 18, but it could be flown with a smaller crew.

LZ 54 first flew on 27 November 1915, completing 14 flights during her nine weeks of service. Several of these flights were patrols over the North Sea, searching for Allied merchant and naval ships. Naval scouting was the main role of the navy's Zeppelin fleet, and a total of 220 such flights were carried out during the war.

The lack of aggressive activity by the German Navy meant the tactical need for such scouting was reduced. During the winter of 1915, LZ 54 became well known to neutral merchant ships in the North Sea due to her frequent patrols. On one occasion, she touched down close to a Swedish ship to inspect her. The ship was allowed to proceed when her neutral status was established.

On another occasion, she and two other Zeppelins forestalled a British air raid by discovering, to the north of Terschelling, an approaching flotilla of three Royal Navy seaplane tenders, an apparent British attempt to repeat their successful Cuxhaven Raid. The British were surprised while lowering their seaplanes into the sea.

== Final raid ==
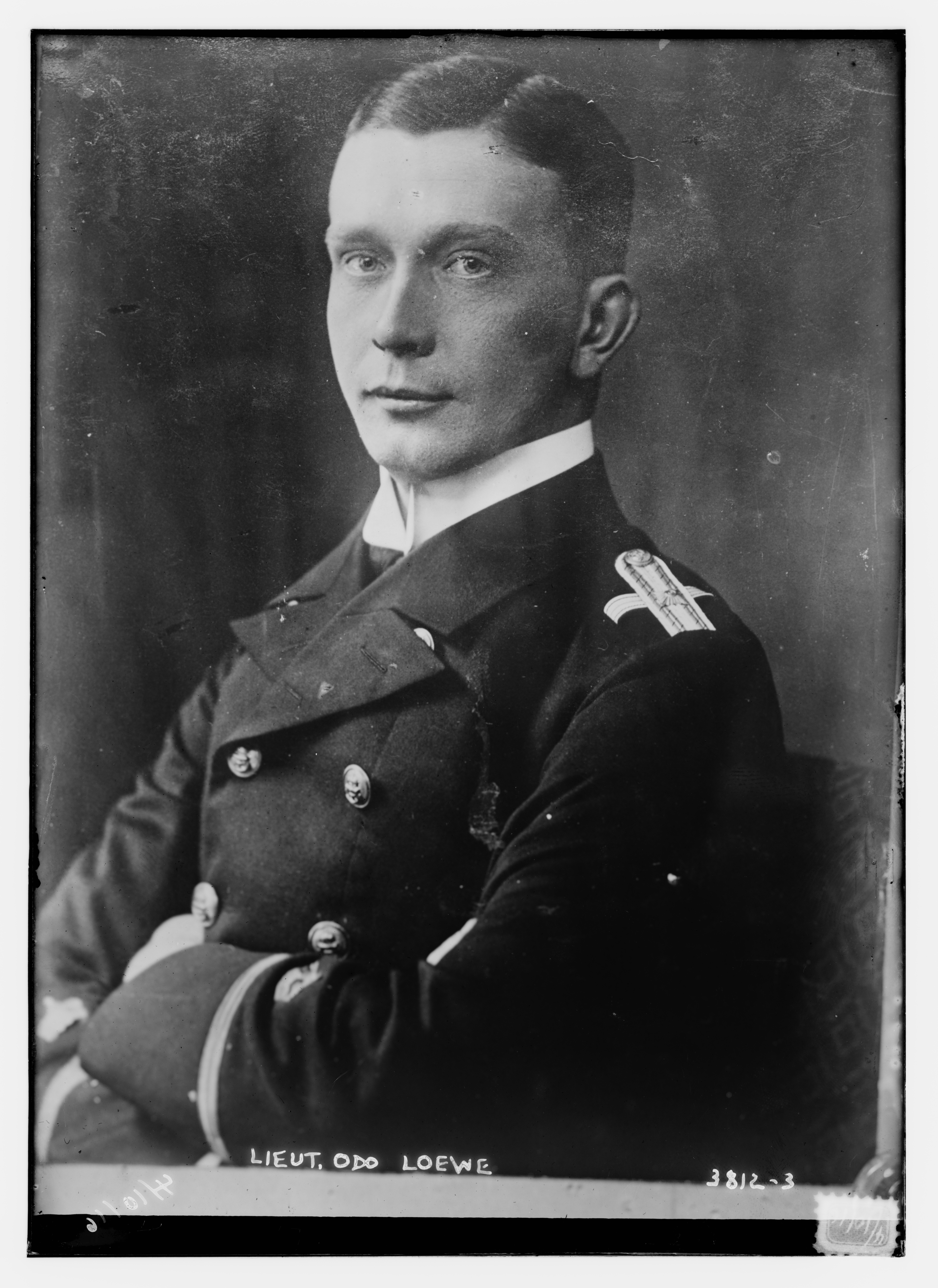
Kapitänleutnant Odo Löwe, circa 1915

Commanded by Kapitänleutnant Odo Löwe, L 19 left her Danish base at Tondern at noon on 31 January 1916, one of nine navy Zeppelins to raid England that night. (Note: Navy Zeppelins L 11, L 13, L 14, L 15, L 16, L 17, L 19, L 20, and L 21.) This was part of a new, more aggressive strategy that had been brought to the German Navy with the recent appointment of Reinhard Scheer as its commander-in-chief. The head of German naval airships, Fregattenkapitän Peter Strasser, was on board L 11, leading the attack personally. He had orders to bomb targets of opportunity in central and southern England, reaching Liverpool if possible.

The Zeppelins encountered thick fog in the North Sea, followed by rain clouds and snow off the English coast, and the attacking force became dispersed; the nine airships crossed the English coast between 17:50 and 19:20. L 19 was the very last, crossing the coast near Sheringham. At 22:45, she reached Burton on Trent, becoming the third raider to attack the town that night. She then proceeded south, dropping the remainder of her bomb load on several towns on the outskirts of Birmingham. At 00:20, a pub in Tipton was destroyed; (Note: The exact time was noted from a broken clock found in the debris.) buildings were also damaged in nearby Walsall and Birchills.

She caused no casualties aside from some farm animals, although bombs dropped three hours earlier by her sister-ship, the LZ 61, killed 35 people in the area, including the wife of the mayor of Walsall; a total of 61 people were reported killed and 101 injured by the raid. Due to the extreme difficulties of navigating with primitive equipment at night over a darkened countryside, the captain of L 21 believed he had bombed Liverpool, in fact around 70 miles (110 km) away.

L 19 made a slow, erratic return journey, doubling back several times; this was almost certainly due to engine trouble. The Zeppelin force had been newly fitted with Maybach HSLu engines. While lighter and more powerful than those they replaced, the new engines were proving unreliable – five of the nine airships had suffered engine failures during the raid. L 19 sent several signals, asking for a position fix by radio-triangulation and reporting the results of her bombing. The last signal was heard from her at 16:00 on the day after the raid when she was 22 miles (40 km) north of the Dutch island of Ameland. She reported three out of four engines had failed and her Telefunken radio equipment was malfunctioning.

Around an hour later, the Zeppelin drifted low over the island, and Dutch units on the ground opened fire on her. The Netherlands was a neutral country and Dutch forces had standing orders to fire on overflying, foreign aircraft. (Note: There was little risk of solid bullets creating a catastrophic fire in a hydrogen-filled Zeppelin (Zeppelins destroyed by fire were generally shot down by aircraft, specially armed with a mixture of explosive, tracer and incendiary ammunition) – see Lehmann, Chapter 6 . However, heavy rifle or machine-gun fire from the ground could cause many punctures in the gas bags that, given enough time, would compromise the airship's ability to remain airborne. Several German Zeppelins were lost this way.) A south wind blew the L 19 offshore and, some time during the night of 1–2 February, the Zeppelin came down in the North Sea. Löwe dropped a bottle into the sea, with a report on his situation and with letters to his family; this was found a few weeks later by a yacht near Gothenburg, Sweden. The German Navy put ships to sea that night to search for the L 19, but they only discovered one of her fuel-tanks, still containing fuel. This was likely dropped as a desperate measure to save weight and remain aloft.

=== King Stephen incident ===
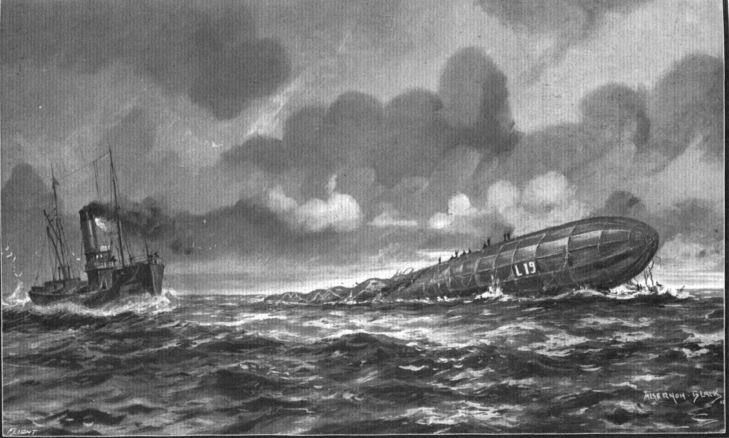
Artist's illustration of the wrecked L 19 and the King Stephen; published in Flight, 10 February 1916

The next morning, the floating wreck of the airship was discovered by a British steam fishing trawler, King Stephen, of 162 tons, commanded by William Martin. The vessel had sighted distress signals during the night and had spent several hours steaming towards them. Clinging to the wreck were the airship's 16 crew. (Note: In contemporary reports, the number of surviving Germans varied wildly, with some stating there were as many as 44. In an interview by the Daily Mail, William Martin himself claimed there were 30 Germans on the Zeppelin, see The New York Times, 5 February 1916.) The normal complement of a P-class Zeppelin was 18 or 19, (Note: Executive officer, commander, navigator, sailmaker (responsible for the gasbags), chief engineer, two altitude coxswains, two steering coxswains, and eight engineers.) but Zeppelins flying on air-raids often flew short-handed, with two or three of the least needed crew members left behind in order to save weight.

The fishing vessel approached and Kapitänleutnant Löwe, who spoke English well, asked for rescue. Martin refused. In a later newspaper interview, he stated that the nine crew of King Stephen were unarmed and badly outnumbered and would have had little chance of resisting the German airmen if, after being rescued, they had hijacked his vessel to sail it to Germany. This fits the known facts, but an alternative explanation for his action was suggested by a 2005 BBC documentary on the incident. This was that King Stephen was in a zone in which fishing was prohibited by the British authorities and that Martin feared that if he returned to a British port with a large number of German prisoners, attention might have been drawn to this and he would have been banned from fishing. Ignoring the Germans' pleas for help, disbelieving their promises of good conduct, and refusing their offers of money, Martin sailed away. He later said he intended to search for a Royal Navy ship to report his discovery to. However, he met none. The encounter with L 19 was reported to the British authorities on his return to King Stephen's home port of Grimsby. No official action on the supposed illegal fishing is recorded to have been taken, however, the vessel did not fish again and later became a Q-boat.

The weather was worsening as King Stephen departed and the Zeppelin remained afloat for only a few hours. During this time, L 19's crew threw a bottle with messages into the sea. Discovered six months later by Swedish fishermen at Marstrand, the bottle contained personal last messages from the airmen to their families and a final report from Löwe.

With fifteen men on the top platform and backbone girder of the L 19, floating without gondolas in approximately 3 degrees East longitude, I am attempting to send a last report. Engine trouble three times repeated, a light wind on the return journey delayed our return and, in the mist, carried us over Holland where I was received with heavy rifle fire; the ship became heavy and simultaneously three engines broke down. 2 February 1916, towards one o'clock, will apparently be our last hour.

— Odo Löwe

Royal Navy ships made a search of the area, but they found no trace of the Zeppelin or her crew. The body of one of the Germans washed ashore four months later at Løkken in Denmark. In 1964, a journalist researching the incident checked Admiralty archives and interviewed two surviving members of King Stephen's crew. This revealed that Martin had indeed been fishing in a forbidden zone and had initially given the naval authorities a false position for the Zeppelin in order to conceal this, making the Royal Navy search for the airship futile.

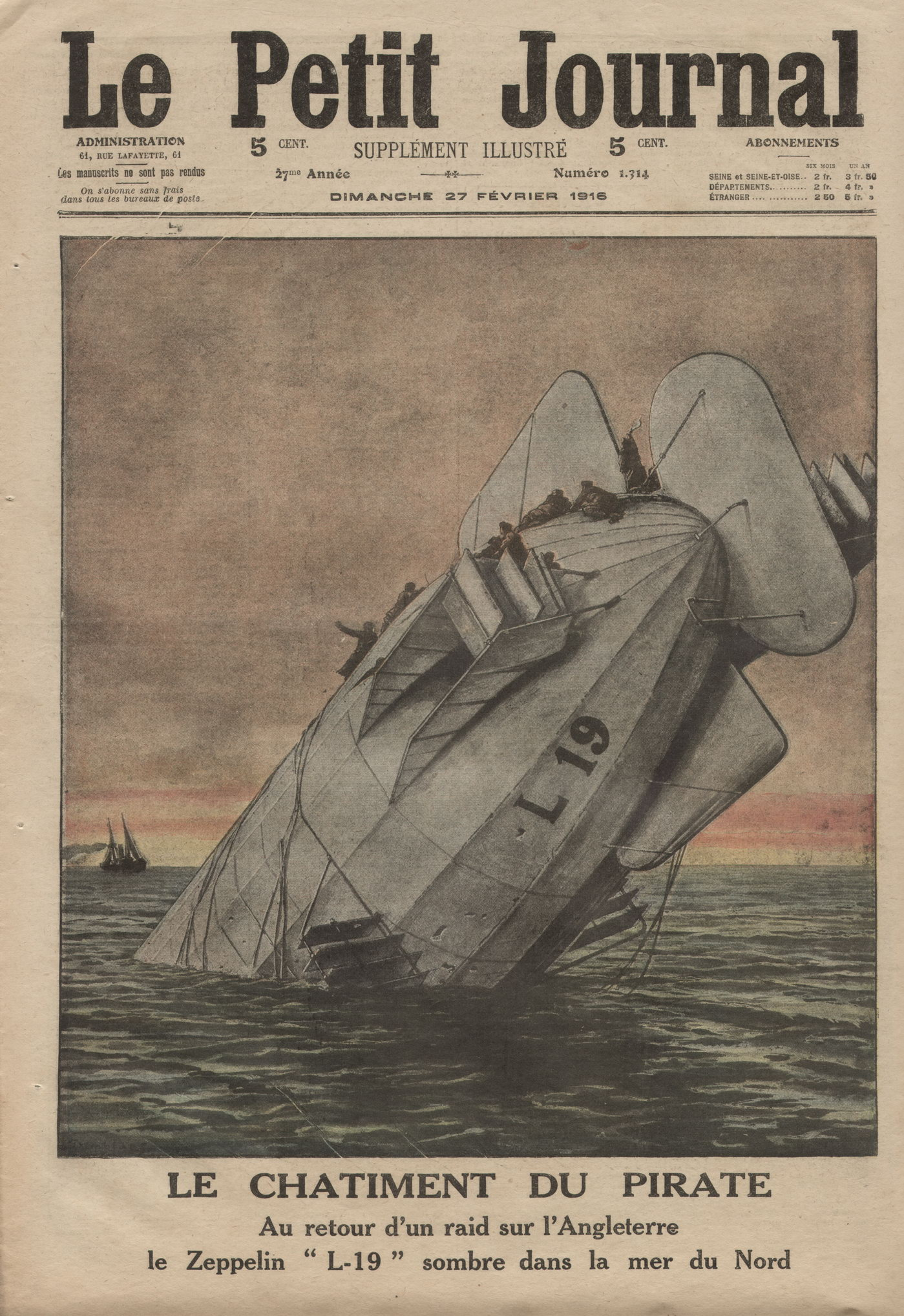
"Pirate's punishment: returning from a raid on England, Zeppelin L 19 sinks in the North Sea"

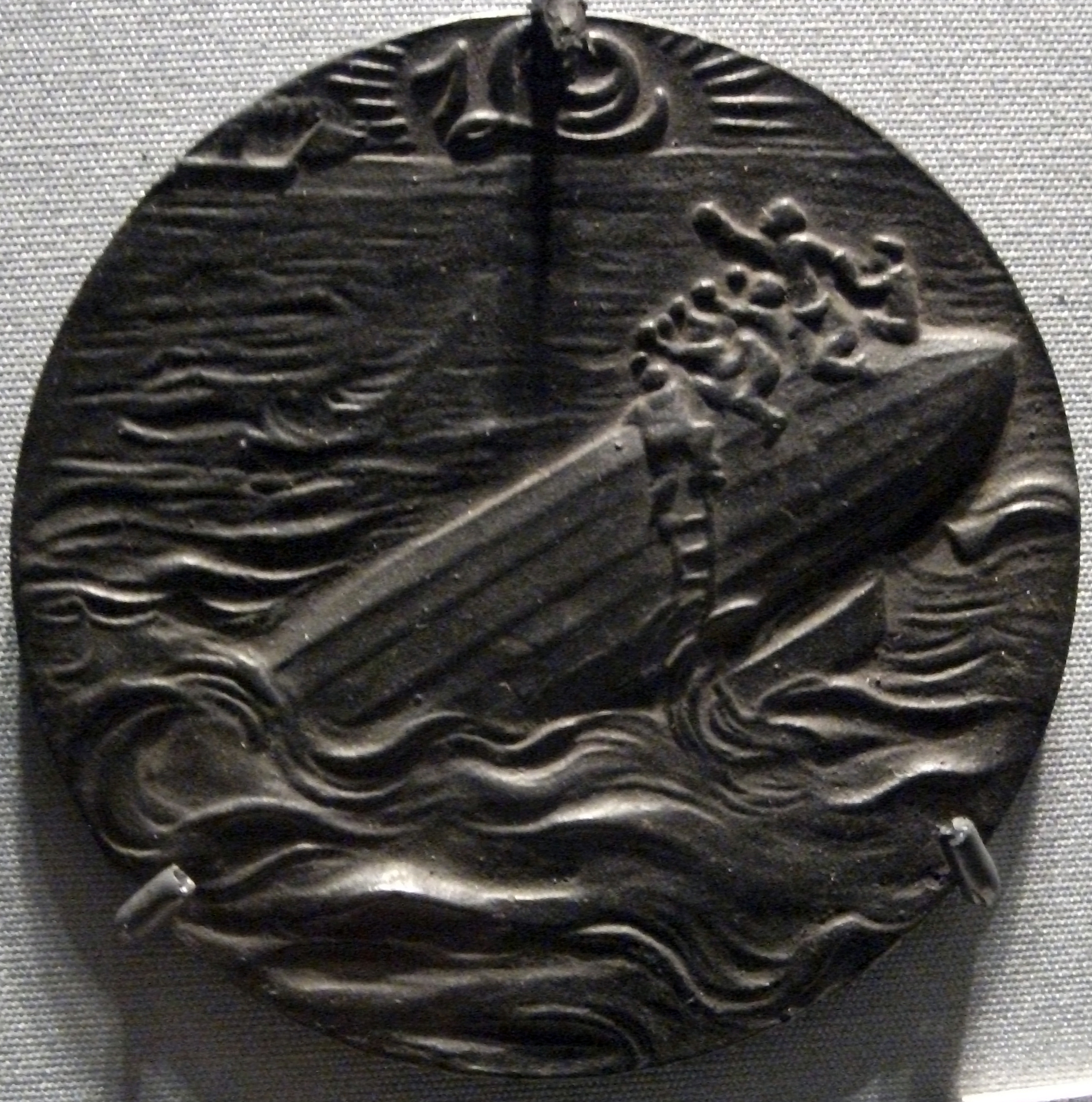
Loss of Zeppelin L 19 medal by Karl Goetz. Exhibited at the British Museum, 2014

The incident received worldwide publicity and divided British public opinion. Martin was condemned by many for leaving the German airmen to die. Others, including Arthur Winnington-Ingram, the Bishop of London, praised Martin for placing the safety of his crew first and not trusting the promises of the Germans. Some elements of the Allied press viewed the Germans' deaths as just "retribution" for their bombing of civilian targets. German airship crews, sometimes referred to as "baby killers" or "pirates" because of their bombing of civilians, were the subject of intense Allied propaganda and public hatred.

Martin was vilified by the German press, as was Winnington-Ingram for supporting him. The encounter between the L 19 and King Stephen also featured in German propaganda. The scene was recreated for a German propaganda film and illustrated by an anti-British medal, designed by Karl Goetz who also designed the well-known Lusitania medal. The incident was still remembered 25 years later, when it was used in Nazi-era, anti-British propaganda.

King Stephen never again sailed as a fishing vessel. After her return, she was taken over by the Royal Navy for use as a Q-ship, under the command of Lieutenant Tom Phillips. (Note: This officer is not to be confused with future Admiral also known as Tom Phillips and was also serving at the time as a Lieutenant.) She was sunk 12 weeks later on 25 April 1916. An official German communiqué, reported by The New York Times, stated she had been sunk by one of the German vessels taking part in the bombardment of Yarmouth and Lowestoft. King Stephen, now fitted with a 3 pounder Hotchkiss gun, had fired on and pursued a surfaced U-boat, but then inadvertently steamed directly into the path of the returning German fleet. She was sunk by the torpedo boat SMS G41 and her crew taken prisoner.

King Stephen's name was notorious to the Germans, and Lt. Phillips was charged with war crimes upon reaching Germany. However, the charges were dropped and he and his crew were treated as normal prisoners-of-war after a photograph of William Martin was published in a British newspaper and the Germans realized they held another man. William Martin himself died of heart failure in Grimsby on 24 February 1917, slightly over a year after encountering the L 19. He had received a large numbers of letters, including both letters of support and, reportedly, hate mail and death threats.

In July 1939, an unexploded munition—described by a press report as an aerial torpedo—was discovered near Kidderminster during renovation work on a bridge. At the time, it was believed to have been dropped by the L 19.

== Relics ==
One of the L 19 crew's bottles, together with its messages, are surviving relics of the incident; they were displayed as part of an exhibition at the National Maritime Museum in London in 2001. The Aeronauticum, the German naval aviation museum in Nordholz, displays one of the King Stephen's lifebelts, as well as her Red Ensign flag, taken from the vessel before she was sunk.

Both the National Maritime Museum and the National Air and Space Museum in the United States own rare examples of Karl Goetz's medal.

== Specifications ==
Data from "Zeppelin L 19". Zeppelin and Garrison Museum Tønder.

General characteristics

- Crew: 18
- Length: 163.5 m (536 ft 5 in)
- Diameter: 18.7 m (61 ft 4 in)
- Volume: 31,900 m^{3} (1,126,400 cu ft)
- Empty weight: 21,704 kg (47,900 lb)
- Gross weight: 37,066 kg (81,600 lb)
- Powerplant: 4 × Maybach C-X (later Maybach HSLu) , 157 kW (240 hp) each

Performance

- Maximum speed: 97.2 km/h (60.4 mph, 52.5 kn)
- Range: 4,300 km (2,670 mi, 2,320 nmi)
- Service ceiling: 2,800 m (9,186 ft)

Armament

- 1,600 kilograms (3,530 lb) of bombs
- MG 08 machine guns
