= 1916 East River tunnel blowout =

Construction accident in New York City

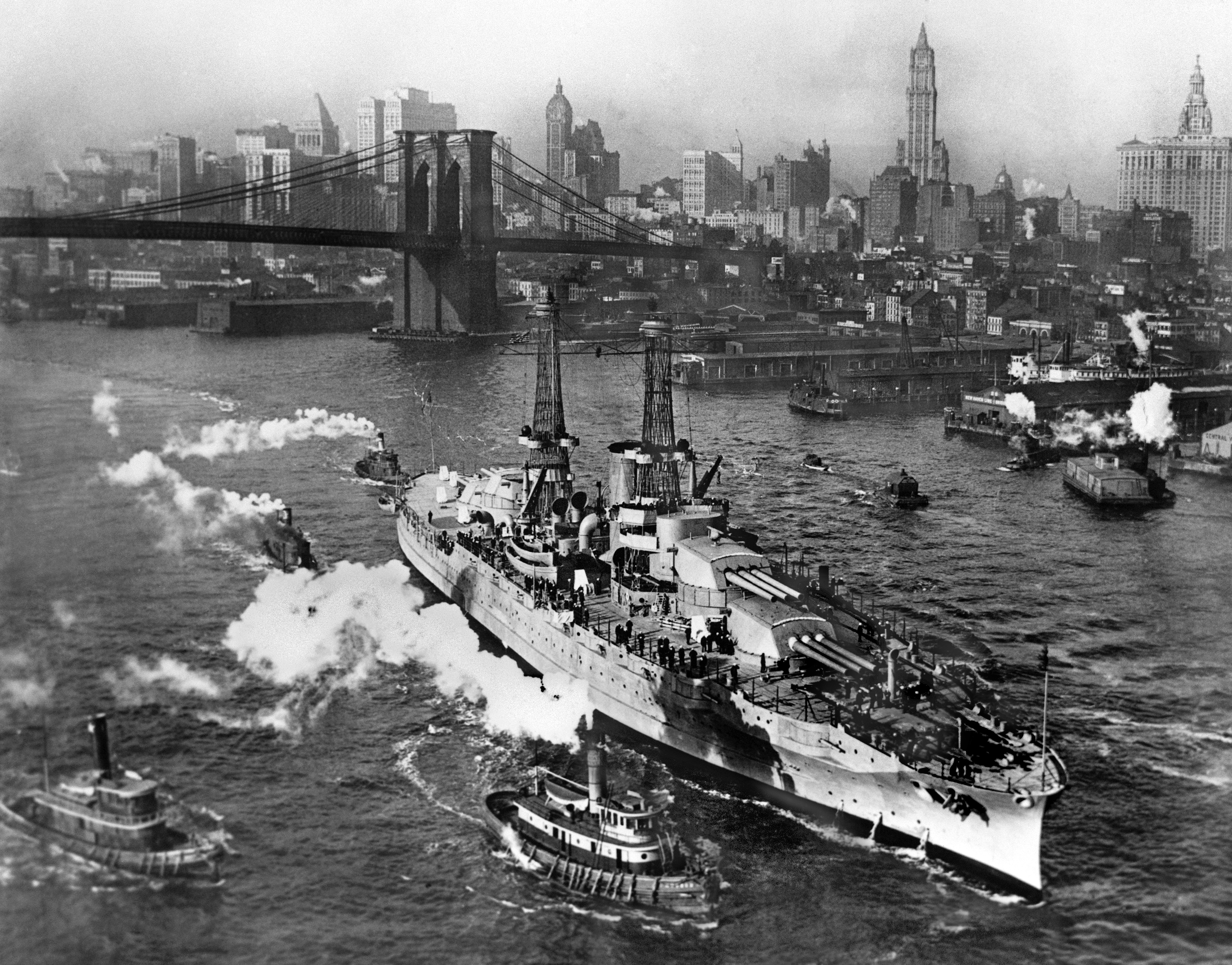
The East River in 1916

On February 19, 1916 three sandhogs working on the New York Subway – Marshall Mabey, Michael McCarthy, and Frank Driver – were shot through 12 feet (3.7 m) of riverbed and up to 40 feet (12 m) into the air when a hole appeared in a compressed air tunnel they were working on under the East River.

== Background ==
Thirty workers had been working on the construction of the New York Subway in a compressed air tunnel (24 pounds per square inch (170 kPa)) under the East River, likely Montague Street. Four workers – Marshall Mabey, Michael McCarthy, Frank Driver, and a man only known as Rottman – were working together removing shoring when they saw earth begin to fall from a hole above them. Driver attempted to plug the hole with a bag of sand, when he, Mabey, and McCarthy were sucked up through the hole, while Rottman managed to escape.

The three men were shot up through the 18 inches (46 cm) hole in the tunnel, and up through the East River. They shot through 12 feet (3.7 m) of riverbed and then into the air atop a geyser "four storeys high". Some witnesses claim they went as high as 40 feet (12 m). Mabey became unconscious during the event, saying "The last thing I remember seeing was the Brooklyn Bridge above me while I was whirling about in the air."

== Workers ==
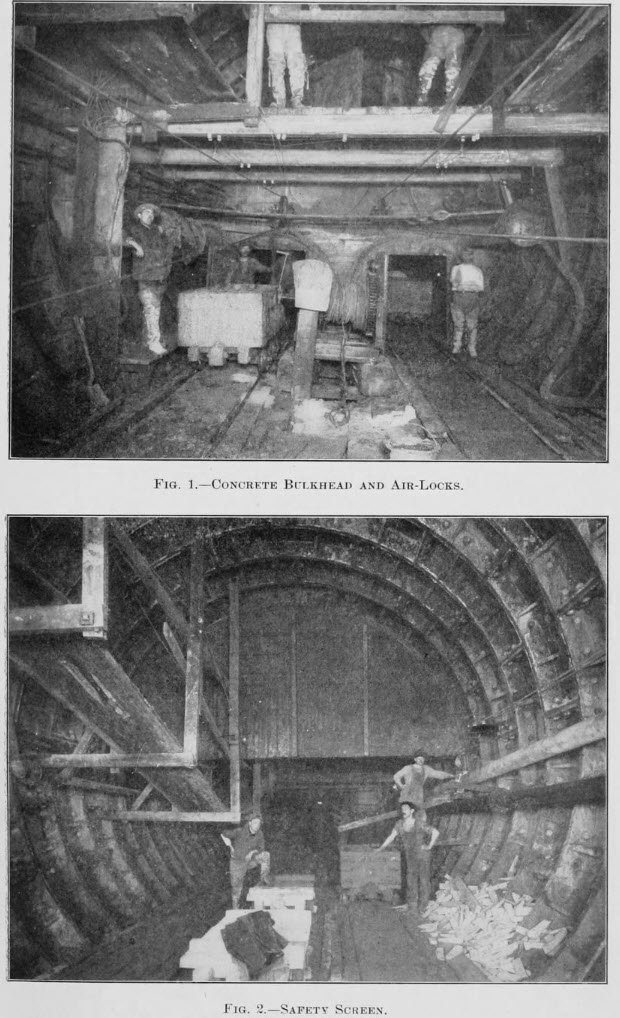
Construction of the tunnel in 1909, seven years before the blowout

McCarthy's body was recovered the next day by harbor police, 200 yards (180 m) from the scene. His body was taken to Brooklyn Morgue. He was believed to have hit his head and drowned. Driver, an African-American man who was a "miner's helper" hit his head of the bottom of a barge and died from his injuries soon after. He was given artificial respiration at Long Island College Hospital, but was unable to be resuscitated.

Rottman, who managed to avoid being shot through the riverbed, was bruised and suffering from shock.

Mabey was picked up by a boat, and then taken to Brooklyn City Hospital with a suspected broken leg and internal injuries, and stayed in the hospital for three days. He returned to work within a few days. He continued working as a sandhog for another 25 years. At the time of the incident, Mabey was 28 years old with a wife and four children. By 1940, two of his children were also sandhogs.

== Tunnel damage ==
Significant damage was done to the tunnel, and work on it was halted for a few days. The break in the tunnel was located by air bubbled appearing in the river above it. The tunnel was fixed by dumping large amounts of clay on top of the area the bubbles were coming out of.

== In popular culture ==
- The 1998 novel This Side of Brightness by Colum McCann was inspired by the event.
- Mabey appears in the 1975 novel Ragtime by E. L. Doctorow. In the novel, Harry Houdini visits Mabey in hospital to ask how he was unscathed, but is dragged out of the room by one of Mabey's sons.
- In 2023, the New York Transit Museum has had performances telling the story of Mabey's survival.
- The story of Mabey's survival was featured in Ripley's Believe it or Not! radio show in 1944.

== See also ==
- Work in compressed air
