= HS Marechiaro =

Italian hospital ship

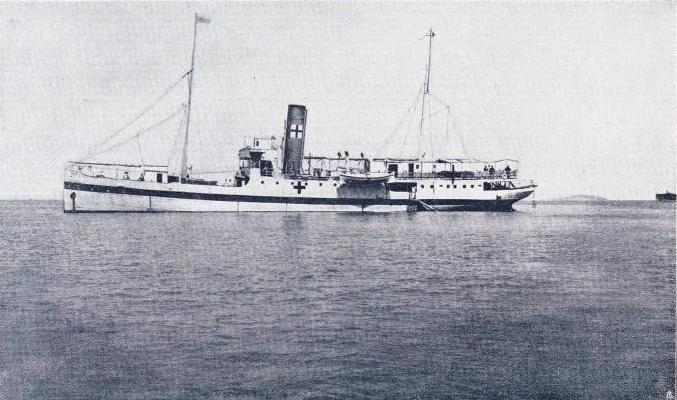
- Italian hospital ship Marechiaro

History

Italy
- Name: Marechiaro
- Operator: Italian Navy
- Launched: 1912
- Fate: Hit a mine from the U-boat UC-12 on February 21, 1916.

General characteristics
- Tonnage: 412
- Length: 173 ft (53 m)

Italian hospital ship Marechiaro was a steam ship originally built by an Italian shipping company, but requisitioned for use as an Italian hospital ship during the First World War. On February 21, 1916 she was sunk near the Albanian port of Durrës by a mine laid by the German U-boat UC-12. British drifters Hasting Castle and Selina saved 104 men from the water while 33 were killed. Other sources mention over 200 casualties.

== Sinking ==
During the war SM UC-12 operated as a minelayer, and undertook 7 patrols in this role. Mines laid by UC-12 were credited with sinking 6 ships. One of these, the Italian Marechiaro sunk on 21 February 1916 and was listed as a hospital ship. Since Germany was not at war with Italy at this stage, though Austria was, UC 12, like other German U-boats in the Mediterranean, operated under the Austrian flag.

== See also ==
- List of hospital ships sunk in World War I
