= SM UC-12 =

Type UC I minelayer submarine of the German Imperial Navy

History

German Empire
- Name: UC-12
- Ordered: 23 November 1914
- Builder: AG Weser, Bremen
- Yard number: 226
- Laid down: 27 January 1915
- Launched: 29 April 1915
- Commissioned: 2 May 1915
- Fate: Sunk by own mine, 16 March 1916

General characteristics
- Class & type: Type UC I submarine
- Displacement: 168 t (165 long tons), surfaced; 182 t (179 long tons), submerged
- Length: 33.99 m (111 ft 6 in) o/a; 29.62 m (97 ft 2 in) pressure hull
- Beam: 3.15 m (10 ft 4 in)
- Draft: 3.06 m (10 ft 0 in)
- Propulsion: 1 × propeller shaft; 1 × 6-cylinder, 4-stroke diesel engine, 80 PS (59 kW; 79 bhp); 1 × electric motor, 175 PS (129 kW; 173 shp)
- Speed: 6.49 knots (12.02 km/h; 7.47 mph), surfaced; 5.67 knots (10.50 km/h; 6.52 mph), submerged
- Range: 910 nmi (1,690 km; 1,050 mi) at 5 knots (9.3 km/h; 5.8 mph) surfaced; 50 nmi (93 km; 58 mi) at 4 knots (7.4 km/h; 4.6 mph) submerged
- Test depth: 50 m (160 ft)
- Complement: 14
- Armament: 6 × 100 cm (39 in) mine tubes; 12 × UC 120 mines; 1 × 8 mm (0.31 in) machine gun

Service record
- Part of: Pola Flotilla; 27 June 1915 – 16 March 1916
- Commanders: Oblt.z.S. Cäsar Bauer; 2 May – 26 June 1915; Kptlt. Karl Palis; 27 June 1915 – 1 January 1916; Oblt.z.S. Eberhard Fröhner; 2 January – 16 March 1916
- Operations: 7 patrols
- Victories: 1 merchant ship sunk (2,382 GRT); 5 auxiliary warships sunk (907 GRT)

SM UC-12 was a German Type UC I minelayer submarine or U-boat in the German Imperial Navy (German: Kaiserliche Marine) during World War I.

== Design ==
A Type UC I submarine, UC-1 had a displacement of 168 tonnes (165 long tons) when at the surface and 182 tonnes (179 long tons) while submerged. She had a length overall of 33.99 m (111 ft 6 in), a beam of 3.15 m (10 ft 4 in), and a draught of 3.06 m (10 ft). The submarine was powered by one Benz six-cylinder, four-stroke diesel engine producing 80 metric horsepower (59 kW; 79 shp), an electric motor producing 175 metric horsepower (129 kW; 173 shp), and one propeller shaft. She was capable of operating at a depth of 50 metres (160 ft).

The submarine had a maximum surface speed of 6.49 knots (12.02 km/h; 7.47 mph) and a maximum submerged speed of 5.67 knots (10.50 km/h; 6.52 mph). When submerged, she could operate for 50 nautical miles (93 km; 58 mi) at 4 knots (7.4 km/h; 4.6 mph); when surfaced, she could travel 910 nautical miles (1,690 km; 1,050 mi) at 5 knots (9.3 km/h; 5.8 mph). UC-1 was fitted with six 100 centimetres (39 in) mine tubes, twelve UC 120 mines, and one 8 millimetres (0.31 in) machine gun. She was built by AG Weser Bremen and her complement was fourteen crew members.

== Construction ==
The U-boat was ordered on 23 November 1914, laid down on 27 January 1915, and was launched on 29 April 1915. She was commissioned into the German Imperial Navy on 2 May 1915 as SM UC-12. (Note: "SM" stands for "Seiner Majestät" (English: His Majesty's) and combined with the U for Unterseeboot would be translated as His Majesty's Submarine.)

== Service history ==
UC-12 served with the Pola Flotilla based at Cattaro in the Adriatic. She operated as a minelayer, and undertook seven patrols in this role. Mines laid by UC-12 were credited with sinking six ships. One of these, the Italian Marechiaro sunk on 21 February 1916, was listed as a hospital ship and sank with over 200 casualties. Since Germany was not at war with Italy at this stage, though Austria was, UC 12, like other German U-boats in the Mediterranean, operated under the Austro-Hungarian flag.

== Fate ==
On 16 March 1916 UC-12 was sunk by the detonation of one of her own mines while laying a mine fields off Taranto harbour. Italian divers inspected the wreck and established its identity. The knowledge that Germany, technically their ally, was assiduously mining their naval bases was a contributing factor in Italy’s decision in August 1916 to declare war on Germany. The submarine was raised by Italy and commissioned as X-1 in the Italian Royal Navy.

The wreck of the UC-12 was located 1700 metres from the shore and it was decided to recover it, given that it was lying in shallow water (31 metres deep).

== Summary of raiding history ==
Date	Name	Nationality	Tonnage (Note: Merchant ship tonnages are in gross register tons. Military vessels are listed by tons displacement.)	Fate
16 February 1916	Memphis	France	2,382	Sunk
21 February 1916	Marechiaro	Regia Marina	412	Sunk
23 February 1916	Monsone	Regia Marina	249	Sunk
26 February 1916	HMD Lily Reaich	Royal Navy	88	Sunk
3 March 1916	HMD Boy Harold	Royal Navy	74	Sunk
8 March 1916	HMD Enterprise II	Royal Navy	84	Sunk
