= Odo Löwe =

Odo Löwe, Sr.
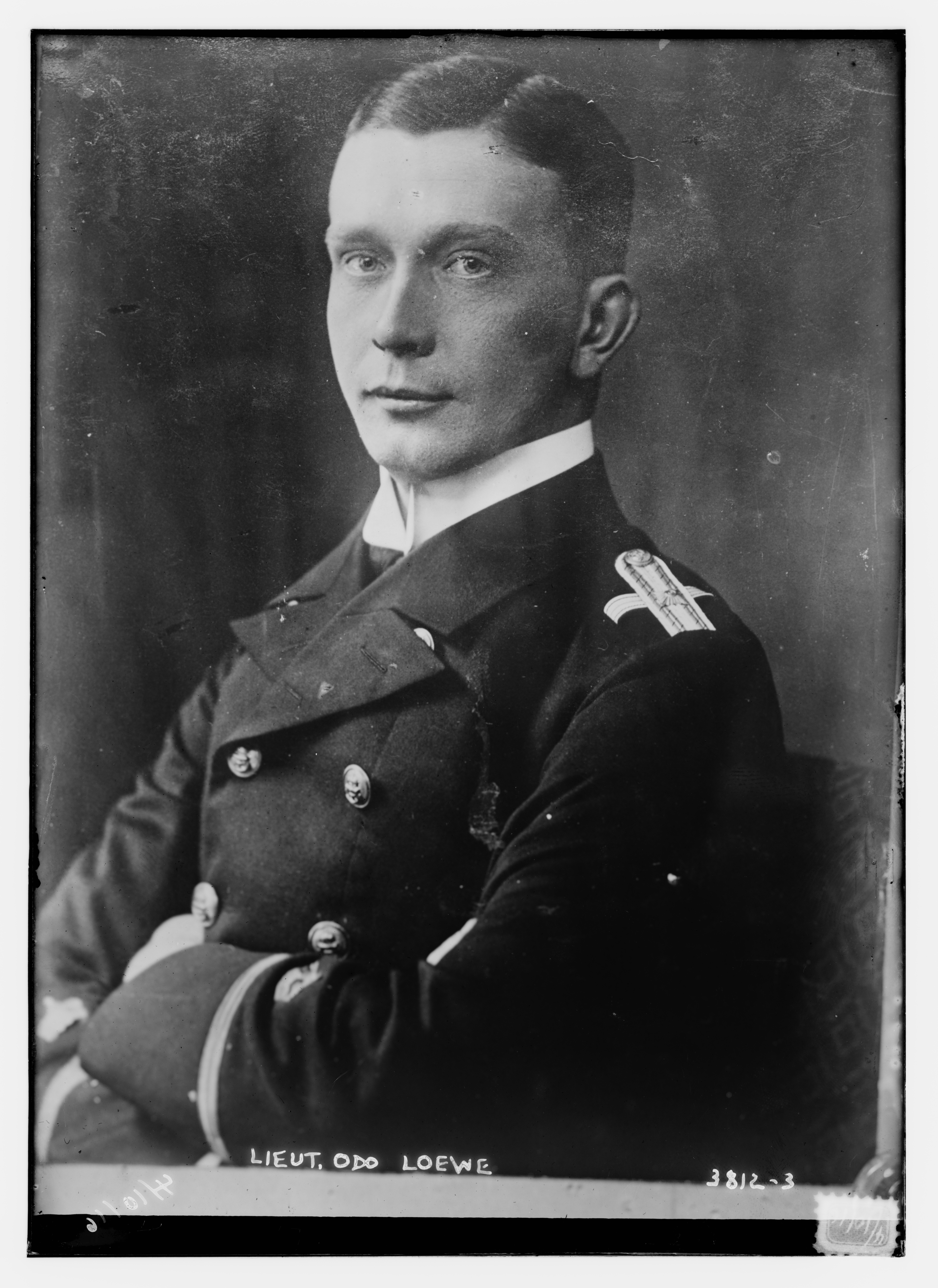
- Loewe circa 1915
- Born: 19 January 1884; Stettin, Germany
- Died: 2 February 1916 (aged 32); North Sea
- Other names: Odo Loewe, Sr.

Kapitänleutnant Odo Loewe, Sr. (19 January 1884 – 2 February 1916) was the commander of the zeppelin LZ 54 (L 19) during World War I.

== Biography ==
He was born on 19 January 1884 in Stettin, Germany. From 24 June 1915 to 19 October 1915 he was stationed in Hage in East Frisia on L 9 with Lieutenant Braunhof as his first officer. On 22 November 1915, took over command of the newly-built zeppelin LZ 54 (L 19) and was stationed in Dresden, Germany. He moved on 29 January 1916 to the airbase in Tønder. Two days later he departed on his fatal expedition.

He died on 2 February 1916 in the North Sea when his zeppelin crashed. He and his crew survived the crash and the British fishing trawler King Stephen responded to their distress flares. The captain of King Stephen, William Martin, was worried that he would be overpowered by the Germans and refused to rescue them; the entire crew of the zeppelin, including Löwe, subsequently drowned.

== Legacy ==
His son, Odo Loewe, Jr. (1914–1943) would go on to command a U-boat and be killed in action.
