= March 1916 =

Month in 1916

| << | March 1916 | | | | | >> |
| Su | Mo | Tu | We | Th | Fr | Sa |
| | | | 1 | 2 | 3 | 4 |
| 5 | 6 | 7 | 8 | 9 | 10 | 11 |
| 12 | 13 | 14 | 15 | 16 | 17 | 18 |
| 19 | 20 | 21 | 22 | 23 | 24 | 25 |
| 26 | 27 | 28 | 29 | 30 | 31 |

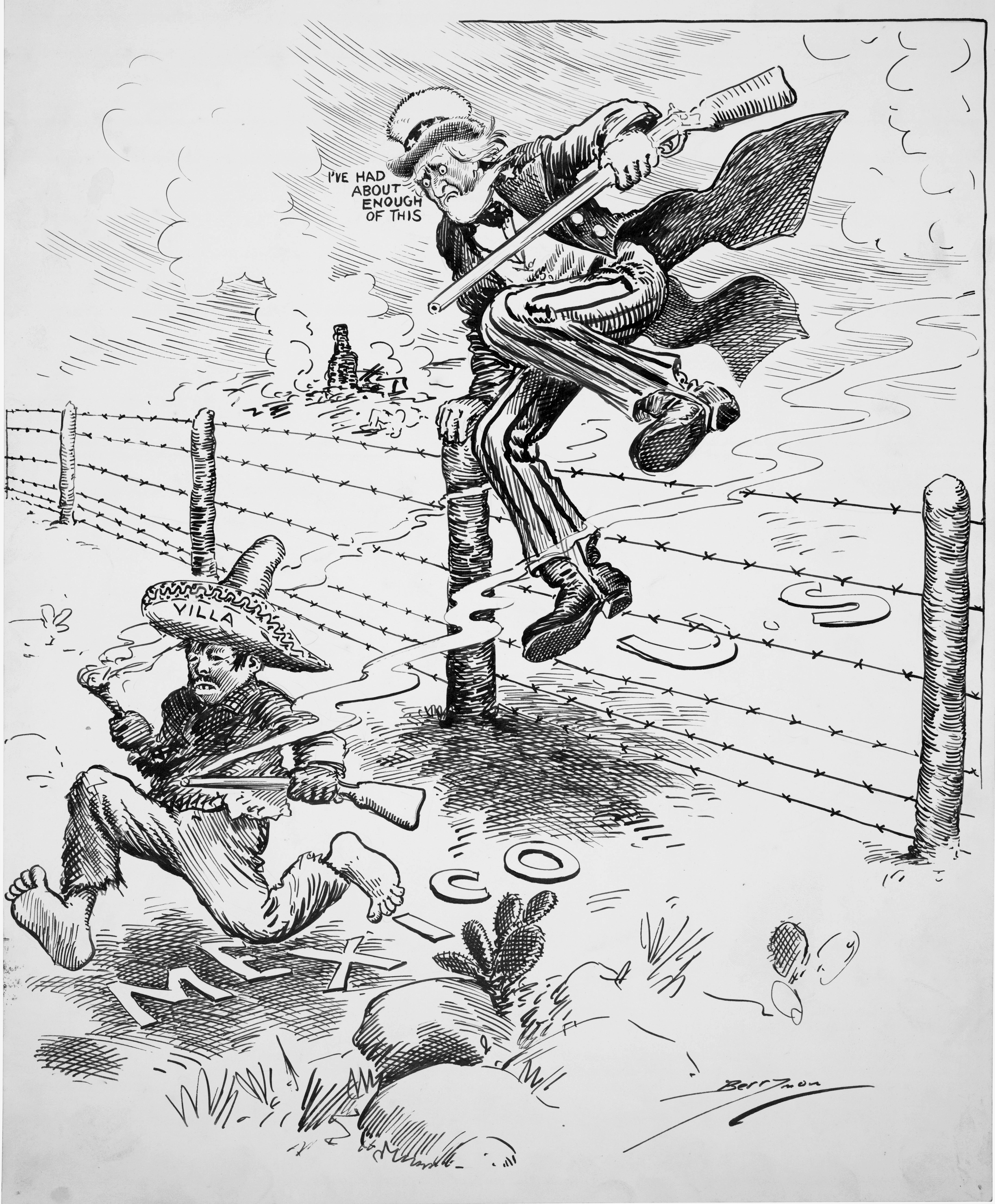
Cartoon by Clifford Berryman on the United States Army expedition to capture Pancho Villa.

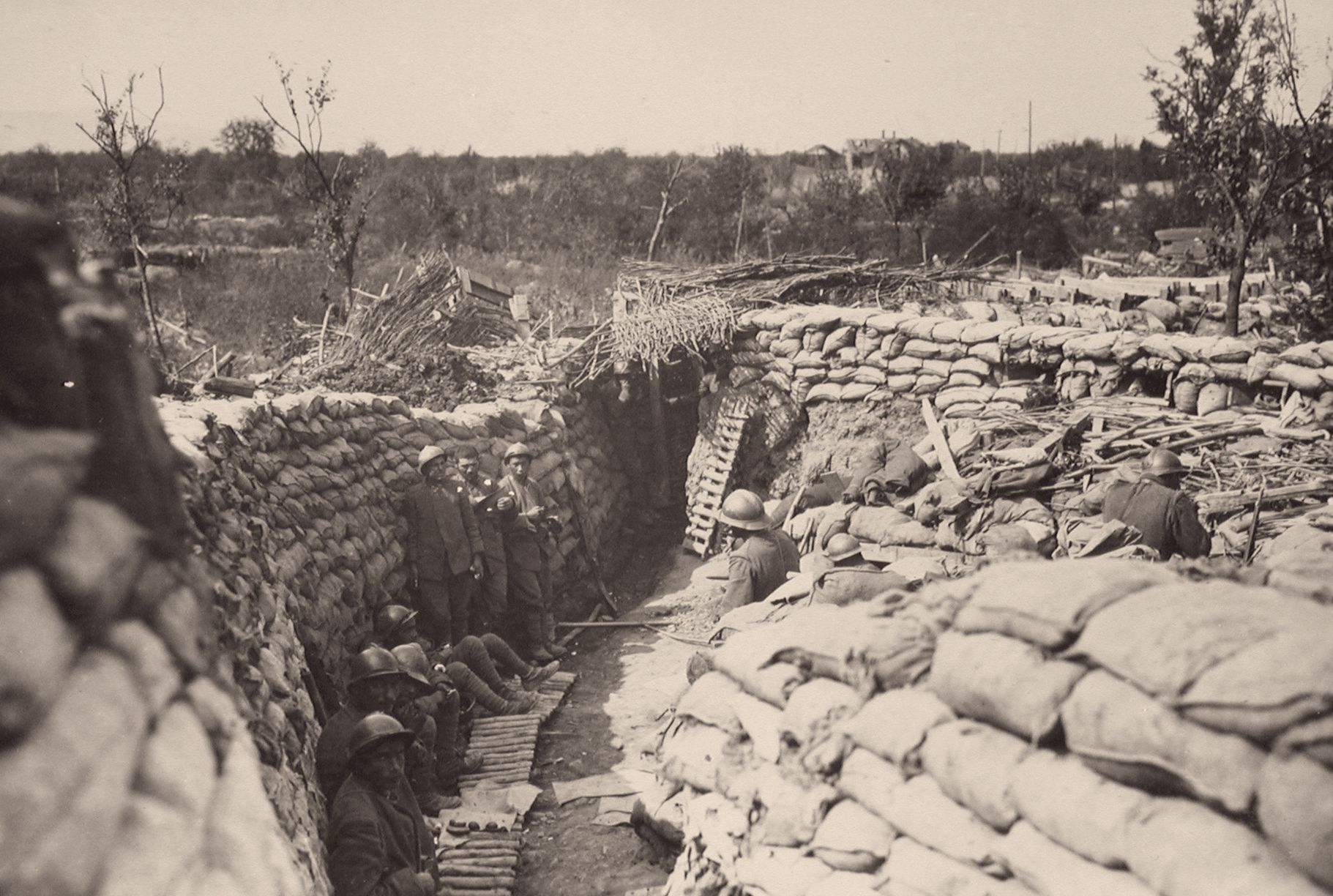
Italian trenches at the beginning of the Fifth Battle of the Isonzo.

The following events occurred in March 1916:

== March 1, 1916 (Wednesday) ==
- Germany began to attempt to use submarines in fleet actions in a bid to erode the numeric superiority of the Royal Navy by setting up U-boat blockades and having the High Seas Fleet maneuver to draw British ships into the submarine lines.
- A new provisional military government for Montenegro was established under Austro-Hungarian General Viktor Weber Edler von Webenau.
- The New Zealand Division was established in Egypt with General Andrew Hamilton Russell in command.
- The 52nd Australian Battalion was established as part of the expansion of the First Australian Imperial Force.
- Air squadrons No. 45 and No. 47 were established by the Royal Flying Corps.
- The art gallery Liljevalchs konsthall, designed by Swedish architect Carl Bergsten, was inaugurated in Stockholm.
- The transfer of the National Library of Wales at Aberystwyth into its purpose-built premises was completed.
- Born: Bing Devine, American sports executive, general manager of the baseball teams St. Louis Cardinals and New York Mets from 1957 to 1969; as Vaughan Pallmore Devine, in St. Louis, United States (d. 2007)
- Died: Walter H. Taylor, 77, American Confederate Army officer, aide to General Robert E. Lee during the American Civil War; died of cancer (b. 1838)

== March 2, 1916 (Thursday) ==
- Military conscription came into force in Great Britain through the Military Service Act.
- The British Second Army recaptured The Bluff from the Germans, a strategic mound near St Eloi southeast of Ypres in Belgium, that they had lost in mid-February. The British took 908 casualties while inflicting 1,622 on the Germans.
- Hohenzollern Redoubt – British forces attempted to recapture the German-held redoubt north of Loos-en-Gohelle, France after it had failed to do so in the Battle of Loos the previous year. Three mines were dug and filled with explosives underneath the German line at the start of the attack, with soldiers using the newly formed craters as assault and hold objectives.
- Senussi campaign – Recon aircraft departed from Matruh to scout enemy between Sidi Barrani and Sollom on the Egyptian coast.
- Born:
  - Oscar F. Peatross, American marine officer, recipient of the Navy Cross for commands during World War II, Korean War and Vietnam War; in Raleigh, North Carolina, United States (d. 1993)
  - Mickey Rocco, American baseball player, first baseman for the Cleveland Indians from 1943 to 1946; as Michael Dominick Rocco, in Saint Paul, Minnesota, United States (d. 1997)
- Died: Elisabeth of Wied, 72, Romanian noble, Queen consort of Romania, wife to Carol I of Romania (b. 1843)

== March 3, 1916 (Friday) ==
- Hohenzollern Redoubt – German forces attempted to recapture the craters the British used as defense during the previous day's assault.
- The first mercury dime was introduced by the United States Mint.
- The Original Dixieland Jass Band began playing at Schiller's Cafe in Chicago, under the name Stein's Dixie Jass Band.
- Born: Paul Halmos, Hungarian-born American mathematician, best known for his advances in probability and functional analysis; in Budapest, Austria-Hungary (present-day Hungary) (d. 2006)
  - Frank Licht, American politician, 67th Governor of Rhode Island; in Providence, Rhode Island, United States (d. 1987)
- Died: Chinubhai Madhowlal Ranchhodlal, 51, Indian noble, first Indian Hindu to become a Baronet (b. 1864)

== March 4, 1916 (Saturday) ==
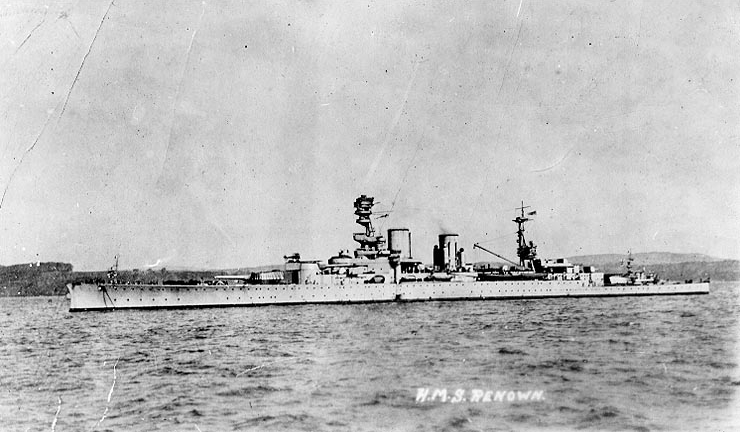
HMS Renown

- Third war budget for Great Britain saw income tax raised to five shillings on the pound.
- The third Irish Race Convention was held in New York City, and resulted in the formation of the Friends of Irish Freedom, which advocated support for Irish independence from Great Britain.
- Royal Navy battle cruiser HMS Renown was launched by Fairfield Shipbuilding Company in Glasgow and served prominently in both world wars.
- U.S. Navy destroyer USS Sampson was launched by Fore River Shipyard in Quincy, Massachusetts, but only saw service for the next three years before being decommissioned.
- The University of Oregon fight song "Mighty Oregon" was first performed at a college basketball game by the Oregon Marching Band in Eugene, Oregon. The song has a similar tune to the popular hit "It's a Long Way to Tipperary".
- Born:
  - Hans Eysenck, German-born British psychologist, best known for his research into intelligence and personality, author of The Psychology of Politics; in Berlin, German Empire (present-day Germany) (d. 1997)
  - Ernest Titterton, British physicist, member of the Manhattan Project and Operation Crossroads; in Tamworth, Staffordshire, England (d. 1990)
  - William Alland, American film producer, best known for sci-fi B-movies including Creature from the Black Lagoon, This Island Earth and It Came from Outer Space, also played the reporter Jerry Thompson in Citizen Kane; in Delmar, Delaware, United States (d. 1997)
- Died: Franz Marc, 36, German painter, one of the founding members of The Blue Rider group, known for such works including The Tower of Blue Horses and Fate of the Animals; killed in action at Braquis, France (b. 1880)

== March 5, 1916 (Sunday) ==
- Spanish ocean liner Príncipe de Asturias ran aground and sank off the coast of Brazil, killing 445 out of 588 passengers and crew on board.
- The adventure drama To Have and to Hold was released in the United States, directed by George Melford and starring Wallace Reid and Mae Murray in her film debut.
- The Spanish association football club Mallorca was established in Palma de Mallorca, Spain.
- Born:
  - Karl Kasten, American artist, member of the abstract expressionism movement with known works including Dante in 1962; in San Francisco, United States (d. 2010)
  - Biju Patnaik, Indian politician, chief minister of the Indian state of Odisha from 1961 to 1963 and 1990 to 1995; as Bijayananda Patnaik, in Cuttack, Bihar and Orissa Province, British India (present-day Odisha, India) (d. 1997)

== March 6, 1916 (Monday) ==
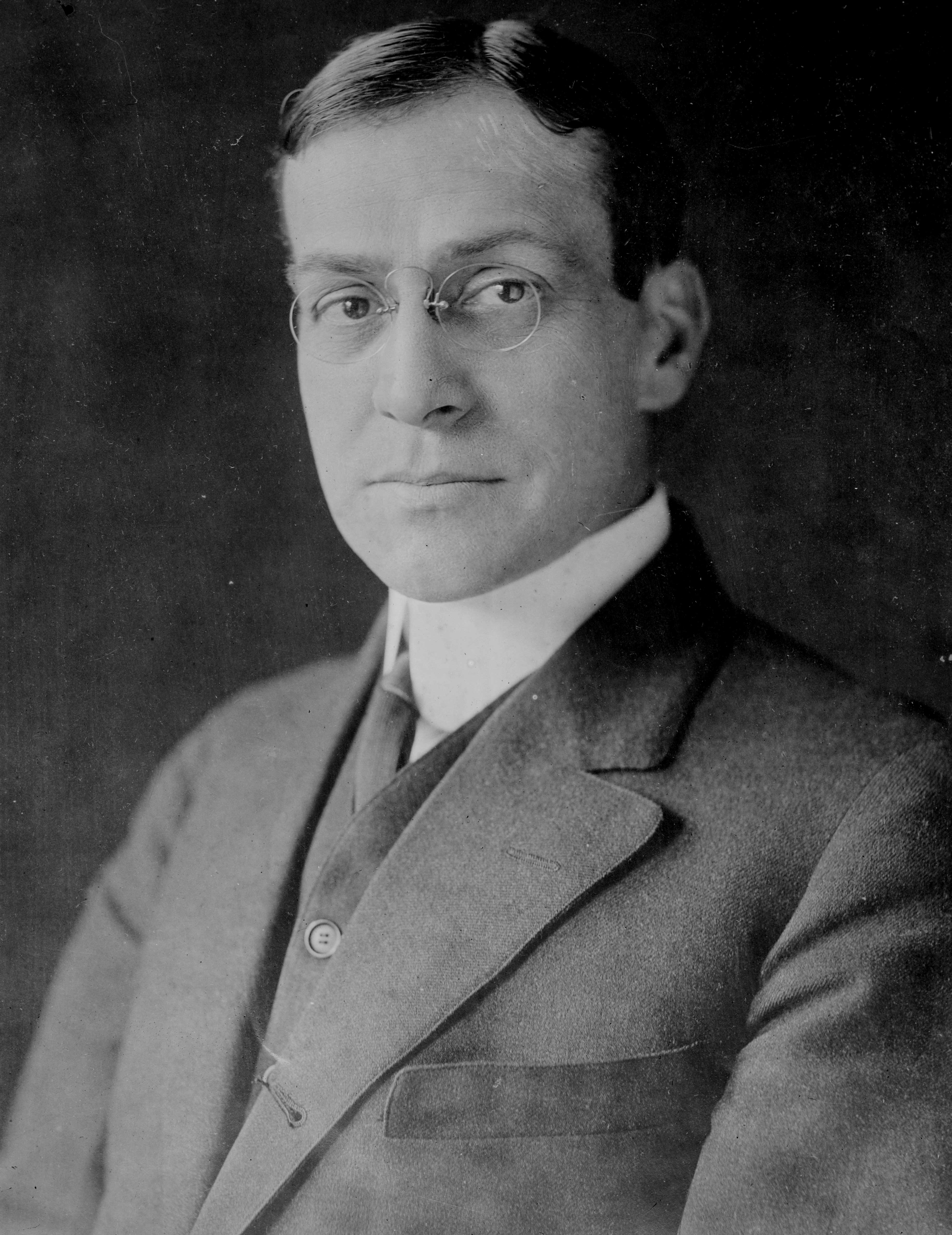
Newton D. Baker, United States Secretary of War

- Battle of Verdun – Germany resumed attacks on the French line.
- Hohenzollern Redoubt – British and German forces clashed over one of the main craters created by underground explosives, known as the Triangle, in an attempt to regain control of the redoubt.
- Newton D. Baker, former Mayor of Cleveland, was appointed by U.S. President Woodrow Wilson as Secretary of War.
- The 48th, 103rd, 104th and 105th Batteries were established as part of the expansion of the Royal Australian Artillery.
- Norwegian shipping company Finmarkens Amtsrederi was formed in Hammerfest, Norway, and would change to FFR when it began operating bus and ferry services.
- Died: George William Whitaker, 75, American painter, best known for his landscapes of Rhode Island, earning the title "Dean of Rhode Island Artists" (b. 1840)

== March 7, 1916 (Tuesday) ==
- The Royal Navy suffered two losses in the North Sea on the same day: destroyer HMS Coquette, which struck a mine and sank with the loss of 22 men, and submarine HMS E5, which struck a mine while attempting a rescue with a loss of all 31 of her crew.
- Senussi campaign – The bulk of the Western Frontier Force returned to the Egyptian port of Sidi Barrani.
- The German automobile company BMW (Die Bayerischen Motoren Werke) was founded in Munich.
- Born:
  - Robert Atkinson, British naval officer and business executive, three-time recipient of the Distinguished Service Cross and chairman of British Shipbuilders from 1980 to 1984; in Tynemouth, England (d. 2015)
  - Frank Nabarro, English-born South African physicist, one of the developers of solid-state physics; in London, England (d. 2006)
  - Clare Dennis, Australian swimmer, gold medalist at the 1932 Summer Olympics); as Clara Dennis, in Burwood, New South Wales, Australia (d. 1971)
- Died: John Caldwell, 66, American politician, member of the Michigan House of Representatives from 1897 to 1900 (b. 1849)

== March 8, 1916 (Wednesday) ==
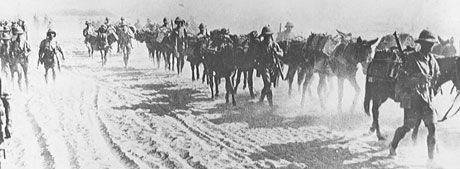
British infantry near the Tigris river during the Battle of Dujaila.

- Battle of Dujaila – An attempt to relieve defending British forces at Kut in what is now modern-day Iraq failed disastrously when a British relief force of 20,000 infantry and cavalry led by Lieutenant-General Fenton Aylmer was stopped by defending Ottoman forces half their size, thanks to the strategic command of German field marshal Colmar Freiherr von der Goltz. The British took 3,500 casualties while Ottoman forces sustained 1,290.
- Ross Sea party – The sledging party of the second arm of the Imperial Trans-Antarctic Expedition was reduced to three walking members during their return trek from Mount Hope in the Antarctic, with expedition leader Aeneas Mackintosh, Arnold Spencer-Smith and Victor Hayward too ill to walk. With the load too much for the able-bodied, Mackintosh offered to stay behind while the rest hauled the other two sick men to Hut Point where they could be medically treated.
- The 43rd Australian Battalion was established as part of the expansion of the First Australian Imperial Force.
- Royal Navy destroyer HMS Negro was launched by Palmers Shipbuilding and Iron Company in Jarrow, England, but it would not complete a year of service when it was sunk in December.

== March 9, 1916 (Thursday) ==
- Germany declared war on Portugal.
- Fifth Battle of the Isonzo – An Italian offensive under command of General Luigi Cadorna was launched against Austro-Hungarian defenses around Gorizia and Tolmin in what is now northeastern Italy and southwestern Slovenia. The attacks were an attempt to distract the Central Powers from counter-offensives at the Battle of Verdun.
- Battle of Verdun – Germany attacked the commune of Cumières-le-Mort-Homme from Béthincourt, France.
- Mexican Revolution – Mexican revolutionary leader Pancho Villa lead about 500 Mexican raiders in an attack against Columbus, New Mexico, killing 12 U.S. soldiers. A garrison of the U.S. 13th Cavalry Regiment fought back and drove them away.
- Senussi campaign – The Western Frontier Force left Sidi Barrani and marched to capture Sollum, Egypt from the Ottoman Empire and their Senussi allies.
- Ross Sea party – Arnold Spencer-Smith, member of the second arm of the Imperial Trans-Antarctic Expedition, died while en route to Hut Point for medical treatment for exhaustion and scurvy. He was buried in the ice by expedition members Ernest Joyce and Ernest Wild, who managed to transport fellow ill compatriot Victor Hayward to Hut Point for treatment.
- Born:
  - Elvis Jacob Stahr Jr., American politician, 6th United States Secretary of the Army; in Hickman, Kentucky, United States (d. 1998)
  - Puey Ungphakorn, Thai economist, Governor for the Bank of Thailand from 1959 to 1971; in Bangkok, Siam (present-day Thailand) (d. 1999)
- Died: James Key Caird, 37, Scottish mathematician, one of the financiers for the Imperial Trans-Antarctic Expedition (two months after his death, one of the rescue boats used by the stranded expedition team to seek rescue was named after him) (b. 1837)

== March 10, 1916 (Friday) ==
- Following the end of the Siege of Mora, German military resistance to the Allies was effectively defeated, ending the Kamerun campaign with British and French forces occupying German Cameroon in Africa. The remaining German military units as well as German civilians fled into neighboring Spanish Guinea.
- The Egyptian Expeditionary Force was formed under command of General Archibald Murray to commit to the ongoing Sinai and Palestine campaign.
- The 1st, 2nd, 3rd, 4th and 5th Australian Pioneer Battalions were established as engineering units for the Western Front.
- The McMahon–Hussein Correspondence concluded with an understanding that the United Kingdom would recognize Arab independence in return for Hussein bin Ali, Sharif of Mecca, launching the Arab Revolt against the Ottoman Empire.
- British composer Hubert Parry wrote the choral setting of William Blake's poem "And did those feet in ancient time" which became known as "Jerusalem". It would be first performed 28 March at the Queen's Hall, London.
- Born:
  - Norman Francis Vandivier, American air force officer, recipient of the Navy Cross for action during the Battle of Midway; in Edwards, Mississippi, United States (killed in action, 1942)
  - Pamela Mason, British actress, known for her roles co-starring with her husband James Mason including Lady Possessed, The Upturned Glass and Charade; as Pamela Helen Ostrer, in Rochford, England (d. 1996)
- Died: Sámuel Teleki, 60, Hungarian explorer, explored northern Kenya and located Lake Turkana (b. 1845)

== March 11, 1916 (Saturday) ==
- Battle of Latema Nek – British and South African forces under command of Wilfrid Malleson assaulted German defenses the Latema-Reata Hills near Kahe in what is now Tanzania.
- Ross Sea party – Expedition members Ernest Joyce and Ernest Wild successfully transported Victor Hayward to Hut Point for medical treatment before returning for expedition leader Aeneas Mackintosh who offered to stay behind as he was too ill to walk but not as in serious condition as Hayward.
- Born:
  - Harold Wilson, British state leader, Prime Minister of the United Kingdom from 1964 to 1970 and 1974 to 1976; as James Harold Wilson, in Huddersfield, England (d. 1995)
  - Peter Hunt, British army officer, Chief of the General Staff from 1973 to 1976; in London, England (d. 1988)
  - Jack Clemo, English poet, best known for his poetry collections The Clay Verge and Poet of the Clay; as Reginald John Clemo, in St Stephen-in-Brannel, England (d. 1994)
  - Ezra Jack Keats, American children's writer and illustrator, best known for his series about Peter, an African American boy growing up in Brooklyn, starting with The Snowy Day; as Jacob Ezra Katz, in New York City, United States (d. 1983)
- Died:
  - Duncan MacGregor Crerar, 79, Scottish poet, best known for "A Poem Commemorating Robbie Burns", "My Bonnie Rowan Tree" and "Caledonia’s Bonnie Blue Bells" (b. 1836)
  - Henry Gassaway Davis, 92, American politician, U.S. Senator from West Virginia from 1871 to 1883 (b. 1823)

== March 12, 1916 (Sunday) ==
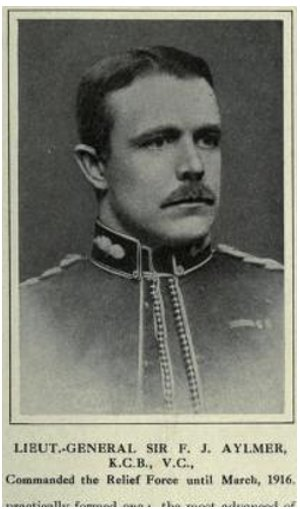
Lieutenant General Fenton John Aylmer

- Battle of Latema Nek – British and South African forces renewed attacks on the Germans and forced them to retreat to Kahe. British and South African casualties were recorded at 270 while the Germans were estimated in excess of 70 casualties.
- After repeated defeats by Ottoman forces that failed to save British troops under siege at Kut, Lieutenant-General Fenton Aylmer was relieved of command.
- The British domestic First Army and Second Army home forces were reformed into the Northern and Southern Armies to distinguish from the First and Second Armies of the British Expeditionary Force.
- Died: Marie von Ebner-Eschenbach, 85, Austrian writer, best known for her psychological novels Die Prinzessin von Banalien and Božena (b. 1830)

== March 13, 1916 (Monday) ==
- Senussi campaign – A Western Frontier Force under command of General William Peyton advanced within 19 mi (31 km) of Sollum, Egypt.
- The First ANZAC Corps was established under command of General William Birdwood for action on the Western Front.
- The town of Westlock, Alberta, was established.
- Born:
  - John Aspinwall Roosevelt, American business executive and philanthropist, best known for his philanthropic service to various organizations including Boy Scouts of America, State University of New York, and the March of Dimes, son of Franklin and Eleanor Roosevelt; in Hyde Park, New York, United States (d. 1981)
  - Lindy Boggs, American politician and diplomat, U.S. Representative from Louisiana from 1973 to 1991, United States Ambassador to the Vatican from 1997 to 2001; as Marie Corinne Morrison Claiborne, in New Roads, Louisiana, United States (d. 2013)
  - Jacque Fresco, American industrial designer and futurist, founder of The Venus Project and author of Looking Forward; in New York City, United States (d. 2017)
  - Robert O. Peterson, American business executive, founder of the Jack in the Box restaurant chain; in San Diego, United States (d. 1994)

== March 14, 1916 (Tuesday) ==
- Battle of Verdun – Germany captured Cumières-le-Mort-Homme and Chattancourt in France.
- Senussi campaign – British forces took Sollum, Egypt with no fighting while an armored column chased the main body of Senussi into neighboring Libya.
- Women in Saskatchewan received the right to vote, the second Canadian province to do so in Canada.
- Ross Sea party – British polar exploration ship Aurora was finally free from the ice in the Southern Ocean after drifting 312 days and covering 1,600 nautical miles (3,000 km) since losing anchor in McMurdo Sound on the Ross Sea near the Antarctic. The ship then set course for New Zealand for repairs and resupply before heading to the Antarctic next spring to pick up marooned expedition members.
- The Manifesto of the Sixteen, declaring anarchist-communist support of the Allied war effort, was published by philosopher Peter Kropotkin.
- Born:
  - Horton Foote, American playwright and screenwriter, two-time recipient of the Academy Award for To Kill a Mockingbird and Tender Mercies, playwright for The Orphans' Home Cycle; as Albert Horton Foote Jr., in Wharton, Texas, United States (d. 2009)
  - Bob Woodruff, American football player and coach, tackle for the Tennessee Volunteers football club from 1936 to 1938, and coach for the Florida Gators football team from 1950 to 1959; as George Robert Woodruff, in Athens, Georgia, United States (d. 2001)
  - Rodolfo Hoyos Jr., Mexican actor, best known for his character roles in TV westerns including Bonanza, The Rifleman and TV police dramas such as The Mod Squad; in Mexico City, Mexico (d. 1983)
- Died: Lou Phillips, 38, Welsh rugby player, played half-back for Newport from 1897 to 1901 and the Wales national rugby union team from 1900 to 1901; killed in action at Cambrin, France (b. 1878)

== March 15, 1916 (Wednesday) ==
- Austria-Hungary declared war on Portugal.
- Fifth Battle of the Isonzo – General Luigi Cadorna halted the Italian offensive after a week's worth of fighting due to wet weather making the trenches impossible to maintain for fighting. Both the Italian and Austro-Hungarian forces each suffered around 4,000 casualties. Skirmishes would continue around the town of Gorizia until the end of the month.
- Pancho Villa Expedition – U.S. President Woodrow Wilson ordered 12,000 United States troops over the Mexico–United States border to pursue Pancho Villa, with the 13th Cavalry Regiment being the first force to enter Mexican territory.
- Hohenzollern Redoubt – Frustrated after their repeated attacks failed to recapture ground on the redoubt, the Germans launched mortar rounds into the craters held by the British to wear them down into retreating.
- The borough Northvale, New Jersey, was established following the dissolving of the Harrington Township, New Jersey.
- Born:
  - Fadil Hoxha, Albanian state leader, 2nd and 8th President of Kosovo and first Prime Minister of Kosovo; in Gjakova, Kingdom of Montenegro (present-day Kosovo) (d. 2001)
  - Junpei Gomikawa, Japanese writer, author of The Human Condition and Men and War; as Kurita Shigeru, in Dalian, Empire of Japan (present-day China) (d. 1995)
  - Junior Coghlan, American actor, known for the serial films Our Gang and Adventures of Captain Marvel; as Frank Coghlan Jr., in New Haven, Connecticut, United States (d. 2009)
  - Harry James, American musician, jazz trumpeter and leader of the big band Harry James and His Music Makers, provided soundtrack music for Young Man with a Horn; in Albany, Georgia, United States (d. 1983)
- Died: John Beveridge, 67, Australian politician, alderman and mayor of the Municipality of Redfern from 1886 to 1891 (b. 1848)

== March 16, 1916 (Thursday) ==
- Anglo-Egyptian Darfur Expedition – A British-Egyptian force of 2,000 men under command of Philip James Vandeleur Kelly was dispatched to the Sultanate of Darfur (now Sudan) to quell a rebellion against British colonial rule led by Sultan Ali Dinar.
- Pancho Villa Expedition – The U.S. 7th and 10th Cavalry regiments under John J. Pershing crossed the border to join the 13th in hunting Pancho Villa.
- United States Army flew aircraft for the first time over foreign soil when airplanes from the 1st Aero Squadron carried out reconnaissance over Mexico as part of the hunt for Pancho Villa.
- Dutch ocean liner SS Tubantia sank after being struck by suspected torpedo fired by a German submarine. All 80 passengers and 294 crew were rescued before the liner submerged, making it the largest single loss of neutral shipping in World War I.
- German submarine SM UC-12 sunk off the Italian coast after an accidental explosion ripped through the hull. The Italian navy was able to raise the submarine and later reuse it.
- Ross Sea party – All surviving members of the sledging team party were reunited at Hut Point where expedition leader Aeneas Mackintosh and Victor Hayward were treated for exhaustion. The trek ended the longest sledging expedition in polar exploration up to that point with a total 198 days.
- The ANZAC Mounted Division was established under command of Major General Harry Chauvel.
- The Arts Club of Chicago was established, receiving its first coverage in the Chicago Tribune.
- Born:
  - Mercedes McCambridge, American actress, recipient of Academy Award for Best Supporting Actress for her role in All the King's Men; as Carlotta Mercedes Agnes McCambridge, in Joliet, Illinois, United States (d. 2004)
  - Tsutomu Yamaguchi, Japanese survivor of Hiroshima and Nagasaki atomic bombings; in Nagasaki, Empire of Japan (present-day Japan) (d. 2010)

== March 17, 1916 (Friday) ==
- Pancho Villa Expedition – Expedition commander John J. Pershing set up a base of operation in Colonia Dublán, Mexico for the U.S. regiments as well as a landing strip for the 1st Aero Squadron.
- Imperial Trans-Antarctic Expedition – British Antarctic expedition commander Ernest Shackleton calculated that the second emergency camp pitched after the sinking of the polar ship Endurance in November had drifted northward on the open ice and was now 60 miles (97 km) east of Paulet Island in the Weddell Sea.
- Died: Charles Bent Ball, 65, Irish surgeon, leading innovator in abdominal and rectal surgery (b. 1851)

== March 18, 1916 (Saturday) ==
- Lake Naroch Offensive – Russian forces launched an offensive at Lake Narach in Belarus at the request of French Marshal Joseph Joffre to relieve German pressure on French forces at Verdun.
- Battle of Kahe – A British force defeated a larger force of 2,000 at Kahe, killing 686 German soldiers and taking another 200 prisoner while only losing 200 men. The massive and humiliating defeat forced German forces to retreat further into German East Africa.
- Hohenzollern Redoubt – An intense German barrage buried alive scores of British soldiers holding onto craters made by explosives detonated underground. This allowed German soldiers to overrun the surviving soldiers, but British forces rallied and regained some of the ground lost. However, most agreed the craters were becoming impossible to defend and orders were made for both sides to dig in and defend the lips of the craters on either side. Casualties on the German side were incomplete but the British confirmed 1,978 casualties.
- Pancho Villa Expedition – The U.S. 7th Cavalry left Colonia Dublán, Mexico to hunt down Pancho Villa and his force that attacked Columbus, New Mexico.
- While flying a Fokker airplane, German ace Ernst Udet scored his first kill by downing a Farman aircraft with the Aéronautique Militaire.
- The No. 36 Squadron was established by the Royal Flying Corps to defend the British coastline from airship attacks.
- Born:
  - Hiram Bithorn, Puerto Rican baseball player, first player from Puerto Rico to play in Major League Baseball, pitcher for the Chicago Cubs and the Chicago White Sox from 1942 to 1947; as Hiram Gabriel Bithorn Sosa, in Santurce, San Juan, Puerto Rico (murdered, 1951)
  - Josef Bryks, Czech fighter pilot, member of the Royal Air Force and POW, recipient of the Order of the British Empire; in Lašťany, Moravia (present-day Czech Republic) (d. 1957)
  - Bill Waterton, Canadian aviator, test pilot of the Gloster Javelin jet fighter plane, recipient of the George Medal; as William Arthur Waterton, in Edmonton, Alberta, Canada (d. 2006)

== March 19, 1916 (Sunday) ==
- Born: Irving Wallace, American writer, author of The Prize, The Word and The Fan Club; in Chicago, United States (d. 1990)
- Died: Vasily Surikov, 68, Russian painter, member of the realism movement and known for works including Boyaryna Morozova and The Morning of the Streltsy Execution (b. 1848)

== March 20, 1916 (Monday) ==
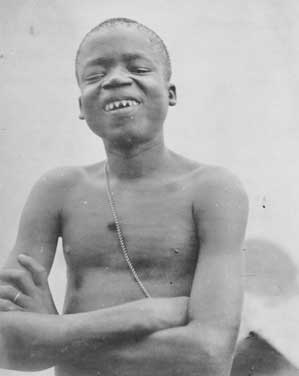
Ota Benga

- Pancho Villa Expedition – The U.S. 11th Cavalry arrived in Columbus, New Mexico, by train and began to cross into Mexico.
- Ota Benga, a Mbuti pygmy from the Belgian Congo, committed suicide after a period of depression. Benga had been enslaved in Africa and sold as a human zoo exhibit in 1906 to the Bronx Zoo before a petition by a coalition of black churches persuaded New York City government to release him. Benga had hoped to return to Africa but the outbreak of World War I prevented any chance of return, on-setting the depression that contributed to ending his life at the age of 32.
- The 4th Mounted Division of the British Army was established to serve as homeland defense for Great Britain.
- The 4th Dismounted Brigade was formed using elements of the South Wales Mounted Brigade and Welsh Border Mounted Brigade for the Sinai and Palestine campaign.
- Born:
  - Bill Martin Jr., American children's author, wrote over 300 children's books including Chicka Chicka Boom Boom and Brown Bear, Brown Bear, What Do You See?; as William Ivan Martin Jr., in Hiawatha, Kansas, United States (d. 2004)
  - Pierre Messmer, French state leader, Prime Minister of France from 1972 to 1974; in Vincennes, France (d. 2007)

== March 21, 1916 (Tuesday) ==
- A crowd attacked Sinn Féin headquarters in Tullamore, Ireland, resulting in three policemen being injured.
- The flight squadron Lafayette Escadrille was established specifically for American volunteers with the Aéronautique Militaire.
- United States Coast Guard commander Ellsworth P. Bertholf directed Third Lieutenant Elmer Fowler Stone to begin flight training, leading to the start of U.S. Coast Guard aviation.
- Arthur Warren Waite, a dentist from Grand Rapids, Michigan, poisoned and suffocated his father-in-law John E. Peck using arsenic while staying at Waite's home in New York City. Waite had poisoned Peck's wife Hannah M. Carpenter two months earlier and also attempted to poison his wife Clara, who survived. Waite was eventually arrested, found guilty and executed for both murders in 1917.
- British civil servant Steuart Bayley opened the Patna Golf Club in Patna, India, becoming one of the venues for national golfing champions in India.
- Born:
  - Bismillah Khan, Indian musician, specialized in shehnai music, recipient of the Bharat Ratna; as Qamaruddin Khan, in Dumraon, British India (present-day India) (d. 2006)
  - Giles Guthrie, British aviator, chairman and CEO of British Overseas Airways Corporation from 1964 to 1968, in City of Westminster; London, England (d. 1979)
- Died: Cole Younger, 72, American outlaw, head of the James–Younger Gang (b. 1844)

== March 22, 1916 (Wednesday) ==
- The temporary Emperor of China, Yuan Shikai, abdicated the throne and the Republic of China was restored once again.
- Battle of Verdun – The German advance ended at a cost of 81,607 casualties, forcing German commander Erich von Falkenhayn to consider ending the offensive.
- German submarine SM U-68 was shelled and sunk by Royal Navy ship HMS Farnborough, killing all 38 crew on board.
- Anglo-Egyptian Darfur Expedition – A scout force of 270 men with artillery and machine guns took the Sudanese village of Jebel el Hella to secure a needed permanent water source for the rest of the column.
- Australian General James Whiteside McCay took command of the newly established 5th Australian Division in Egypt, and sooner after forced the unit on a grueling three-day march through the desert to relieve ANZAC forces protecting the Suez Canal. The march in full-pack under hot conditions led to the unit losing several men from thirst and exhaustion.
- U.S. Navy destroyer USS Rowan was launched by Fore River Shipyard in Quincy, Massachusetts, and would serve until 1922 when it was decommissioned.
- J. R. R. Tolkien and Edith Bratt were married at St. Mary's Church in Warwick, England. They will serve as the inspiration for the fictional characters Lúthien and Beren in The Silmarillion. Tolkien left for military service in France at the beginning of June.
- Born: Stanisław Król, Polish fighter pilot, member of the Royal Air Force during World War II, part of the mass escape from the German POW camp Stalag Luft III but was executed after being recaptured; in Zagorzyce, Poland (executed, 1944)

== March 23, 1916 (Thursday) ==
- Ross Sea party – Using a wireless transmitter built from scratch, British polar exploration ship Aurora was able to send a radio transmission to Bluff Station, New Zealand and Hobart, Tasmania, providing the public the first information on the state of the expedition since late 1914.
- Born: Harkishan Singh Surjeet, Indian politician, General Secretary of the Communist Party of India from 1992 to 2005; in Bundala, Punjab, British India (present-day India) (d. 2008)
- Died: Jules Gravereaux, 61, French horticulturalist, designer of the Roseraie du Val-de-Marne garden in L'Haÿ-les-Roses, France (b. 1844)

== March 24, 1916 (Friday) ==
- The French ferry SS Sussex was torpedoed by German submarine SM UB-29 in the English Channel with at least 50 killed (including the composer Enrique Granados), resulting on May 4 in the Sussex pledge by Germany to the United States.
- Royal Navy submarine HMS E24 was logged as missing while on a mission in the Heligoland Bight. It was later believed it had struck a mine and sank with all 31 crew on board.
- Born:
  - Donald Hamilton, Swedish-American writer, best known for the Matt Helm detective series; in Uppsala, Sweden (d. 2006)
  - Harry B. Whittington, British paleontologist, leading researcher into the Cambrian period; in Birmingham, England (d. 2010)
- Died: Worth G. Ross, 61, American naval officer, third Commandant of the Coast Guard (b. 1854)

== March 25, 1916 (Saturday) ==
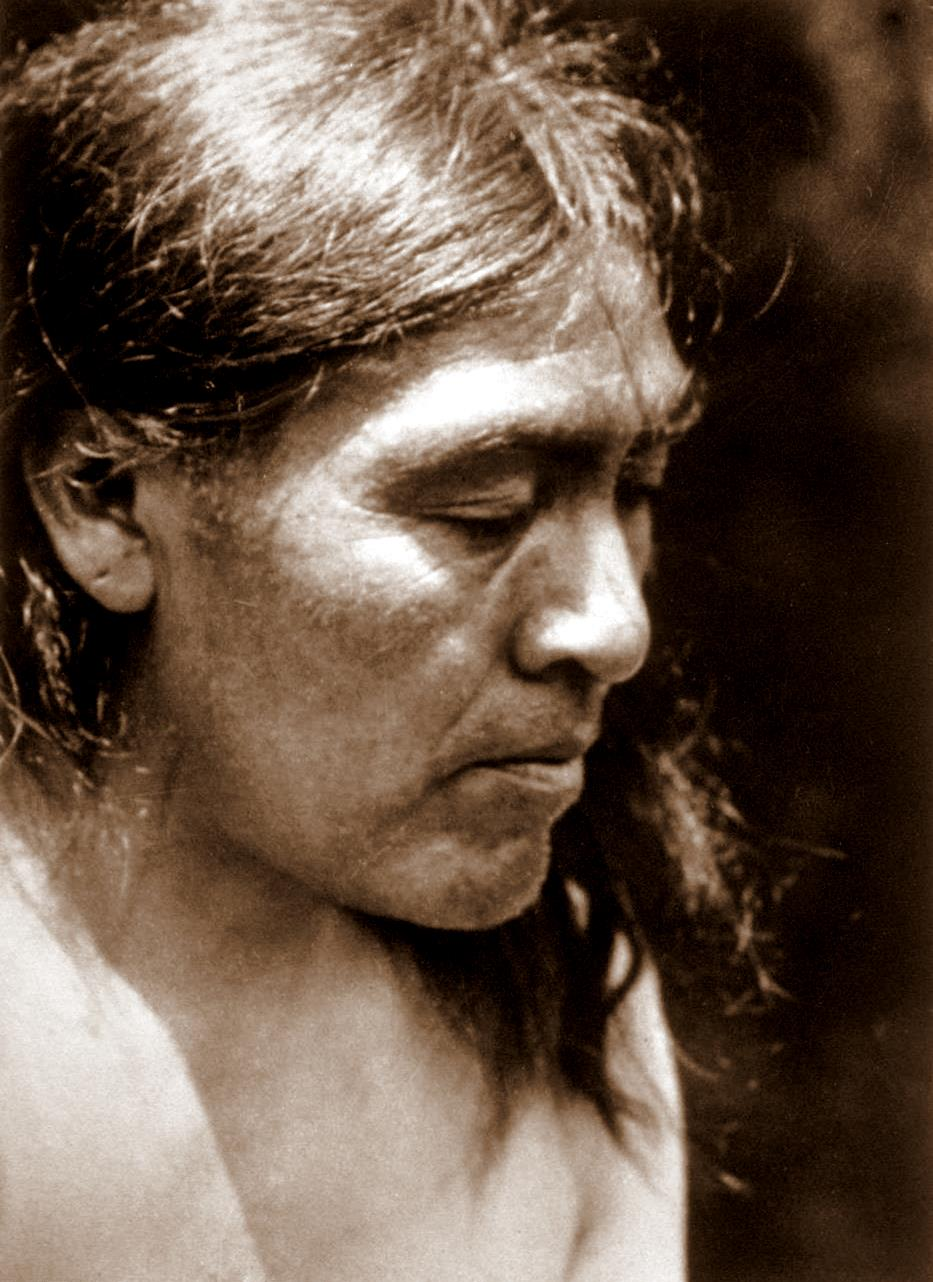
Ishi

- Imperial Trans-Antarctic Expedition – The camp of the survivors of the Endurance shipwreck in November had drifted further into the Weddell Sea and was around 100 miles (160 km) due south of the first islands in the South Shetland Islands chain. Expedition commander Ernest Shackleton believed the crew could use the three recovered lifeboats to hop between the islands to reach Deception Island where whalers were known to anchor and stock supplies.
- Ishi, the last known member of the Yana people that were indigenous to the region that is now California, died after contracting tuberculosis. Ishi only came into contact with modern civilization in 1911, spending most of his life in his natural indigenous settings, but lived the last five years of his life at the University of California, San Francisco, where he worked with anthropologists to deduce much of the extinct Yana culture.
- The Military Medal was instituted as a military decoration for personnel of the British Army and other services below commissioned rank, for bravery in battle on land.

== March 26, 1916 (Sunday) ==
- Royal Navy battleship HMS Vengeance shelled and sunk German hospital ship HS Tabora off the coast of East Africa on suspicion that it was really a troop or ammunition ship in disguise. The lack of response from Germany following the sinking led the Royal Navy led to believe that Tabora was probably not a hospital ship and so was not in violation of the Hague Conventions.
- Anglo-Egyptian Darfur Expedition – The entire column rendezvoused at the village of Jebel el Hella and established a beachhead to operate a put-down of the Sudanese rebellion.
- Maharaja Jitendra Narayan presided over the opening of Nripendra Narayan Memorial High School, the oldest secondary school in West Bengal, India.
- Born:
  - Christian B. Anfinsen, American chemist, recipient of the Nobel Prize in Chemistry for research into ribonuclease found in RNA; in Monessen, Pennsylvania, United States (d. 1995)
  - Sterling Hayden, American actor, best known for his roles in Johnny Guitar, Dr. Strangelove, and The Godfather; as Sterling Relyea Walter, in Montclair, New Jersey, United States (d. 1986)
  - Vic Schoen, American musician, bandleader for Benny Goodman, Glenn Miller and Tommy Dorsey; as Victor Clarence Schoen, in New York City, United States (d. 2000)
  - Bill Edrich, English cricketer, played as batman and bowler for the Middlesex, Marylebone, Norfolk and England cricket teams between 1938 and 1955; as William John Edrich, in Norfolk, England (d. 1986)
- Died: George Francis Houck, 68, American clergy and historian, Chancellor of the Roman Catholic Diocese of Cleveland and author the first volume of History of Catholicity in Northern Ohio and the Diocese of Cleveland from 1749 to December 31, 1900 (b. 1847)

== March 27, 1916 (Monday) ==
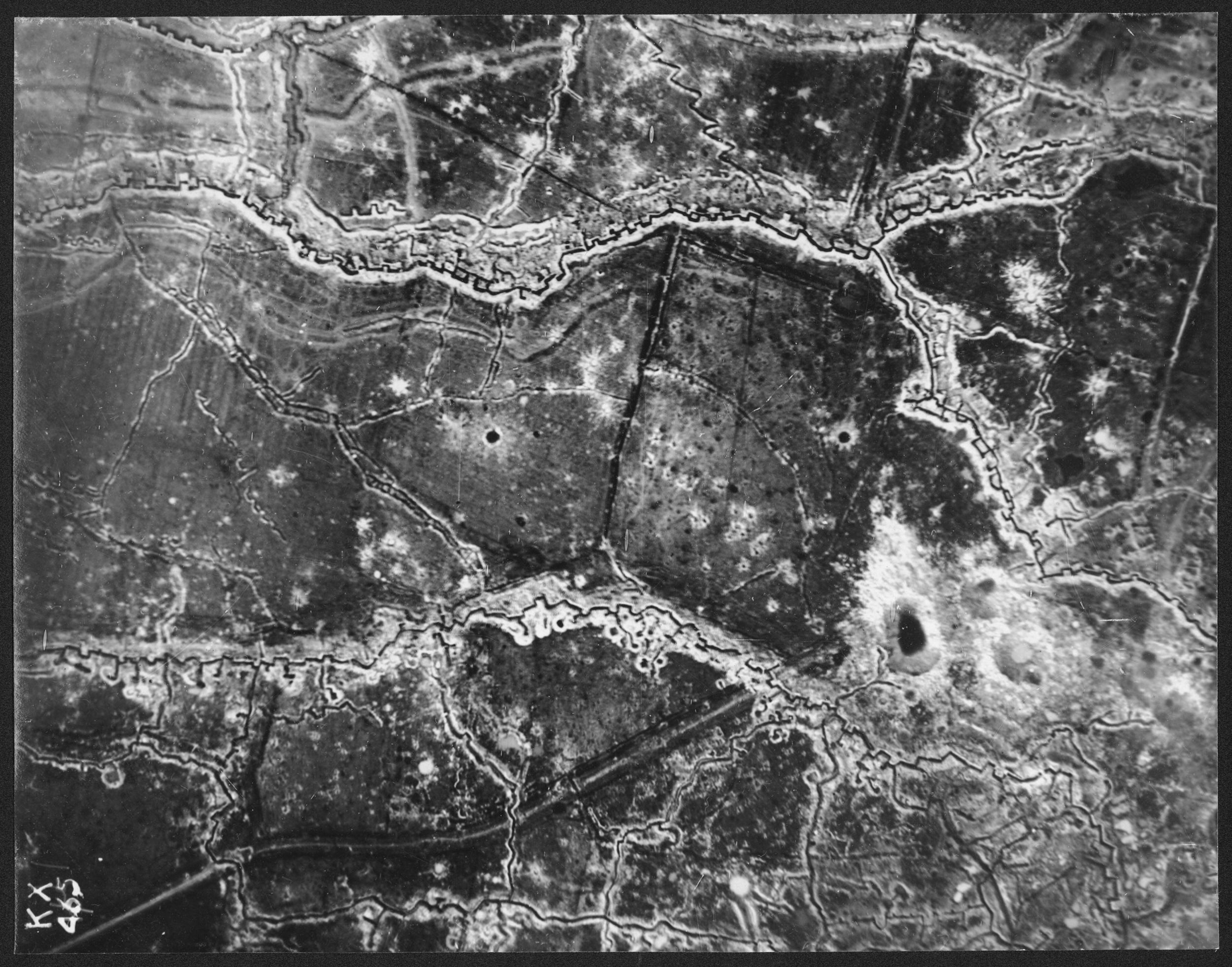
An aerial view of St Eloi, Belgium, 19 March 1916, before the British attack

- Actions of St Eloi Craters — British tunneling engineers detonated several mines loaded with explosives to destroy several German front line trenches around St Eloi, Belgium before infantry moved into secure and defend the craters left behind.
- Hotels in South Australia were forced to close at 6 p.m., leading to the beginning of the "six o'clock swill". Mandatory closings would extend to other parts of Australia, leading to duplication of the drinking phenomena.
- Died: Susan Blow, 72, American public servant, established the first American kindergarten program in New York City (b. 1843)

== March 28, 1916 (Tuesday) ==
- German submarine Deutschland was launched by Norddeutscher Lloyd in Bremen as both a merchant and military vessel during World War I.
- Cole Porter debuted with his first musical, the comic opera See America First by T. Lawrason Riggs, at Maxine Elliott's Theatre on Broadway in New York City, but the show was a commercial and critical flop.
- Austrian composer Erich Wolfgang Korngold debuted two operas simultaneously at the National Theatre Munich: Der Ring des Polykrates and Violanta (both were written when he was 17).
- Died: Swadeshabhimani Ramakrishna Pillai, 37, Indian journalist and activist, editor of Swadeshabhimani (The Patriot), biographer of Karl Marx and Benjamin Franklin (b. 1878)

== March 29, 1916 (Wednesday) ==
- Battle of Guerrero – The U.S. 7th Cavalry Regiment of 370 men under command of Colonel George A. Dodd successfully charged and routed militia of 500 soldiers loyal to Pancho Villa in Guerrero, Mexico, inflicting 75 casualties while only sustaining five wounded. It was the first military engagement since the start of the Pancho Villa Expedition.
- Born:
  - Eugene McCarthy, U.S. Senator from Minnesota from 1959 to 1971, 1968 Democratic presidential candidate; in Watkins, Minnesota, United States (d. 2005)
  - Bob Voigts, American football and basketball coach, coached Northwestern University where it became Rose Bowl champions in 1948; as Werner Robert Voigts, in Evanston, Illinois, United States (d. 2000)
  - Ursula Goetze, German political activist, known for her opposition to the Government of Nazi Germany, arrest and execution in 1943; in Berlin, German Empire (present-day Germany) (executed, 1943)

== March 30, 1916 (Thursday) ==
- Lake Naroch Offensive – The Russian offensive was called off after mounting casualties and the spring thaw had turned attacking ground to swamp. Both sides recorded conflicting casualty reports, with casualties on the opposing side inflated to exceed their losses. The Russian Second Army lost 76,409 men, including 12,000 from hypothermia but German estimated the tally to be around 110,000. German recorded their own casualties at 20,000, while the Russian forces had it double the size.
- Actions of St Eloi Craters — Germans were forced out of two out of the five craters created by Allied detonations three days earlier at St Eloi, Belgium.
- Russian hospital ship SS Portugal was sunk by German submarine SM U-33 in the Black Sea, with only 158 out of the 273 passengers and crew rescued.
- The Montreal Canadiens defeated the Portland Rosebuds in the Stanley Cup Final by three games to two.

== March 31, 1916 (Friday) ==
- Battle of Verdun – The German Fifth Army called on command for more reinforcements based on reports the French front line was close to collapsing and would not be able to launch a counter-offensive.
- Actions of St Eloi Craters — German counterattacks to retake the craters failed.
- Seven German Navy Zeppelins attempted to bomb London, but two turned back with engine trouble, and L 15 was so badly damaged by British fighters and antiaircraft guns that she crash-landed off the coast of England and her crew was captured.
- Ross Sea party – British polar exploration ship Aurora neared New Zealand but was unable to enter port due to stormy weather.
- The British Army cavalry units were reorganized into the 1st, 2nd, 3rd and 4th Mounted Divisions.
- Born: Tommy Bolt, American golfer, four-time winner of the PGA Championship, winner of the 1952 Masters Tournament and 1958 U.S. Open; as Thomas Henry Bolt, in Haworth, Oklahoma, United States (d. 2008)
