= Hohenzollern Redoubt (disambiguation) =

Hohenzollern Redoubt is a German fortification on the Western Front in the First World War.

Hohenzollern Redoubt may also refer to:

- Actions of the Hohenzollern Redoubt, fought 13–19 October 1915 during the Battle of Loos
- Hohenzollern Redoubt action, 2–18 March 1916
- Hohenzollern Redoubt Memorial
