= Invasion of Darfur (1916) =

1916 Anglo-Egyptian military operation during WWI

- Part of the First World War
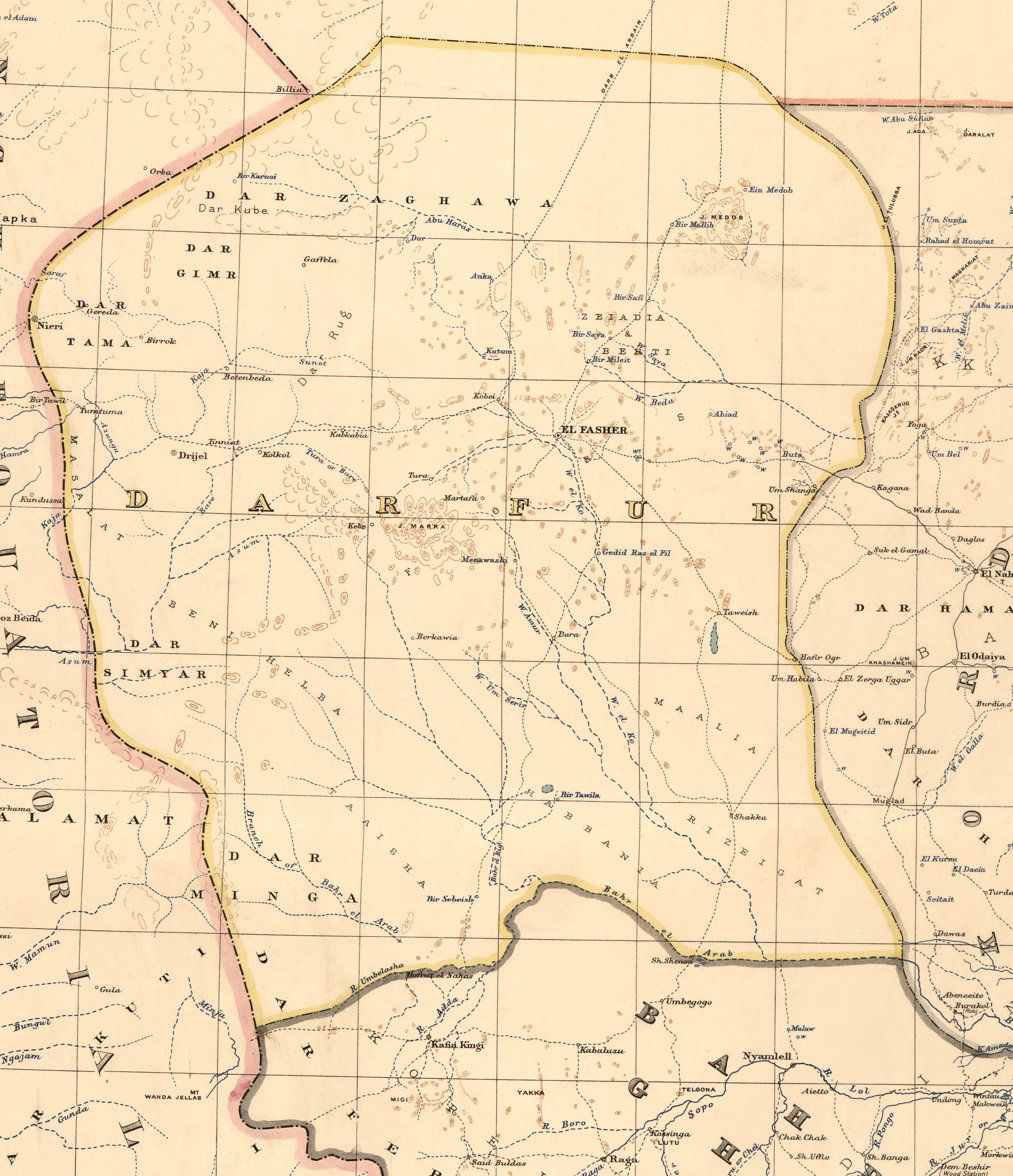
- Map of Darfur in 1914.
Date	16 March – 6 November 1916 (7 months and 3 weeks)
Location	Darfur, now a part of Sudan 13°00′N 25°00′E
Result	Anglo-Egyptian victory
Territorial changes	Darfur became a province of Sudan

Belligerents
British Empire; Anglo-Egyptian Sudan; Sultanate of Egypt	Sultanate of Darfur; Supported by: Ottoman Empire; Senussi

Commanders and leaders
Reginald Wingate; Philip Kelly	Ali Dinar †; Ramadan Ali †; Sulayman Ali †

Units involved
Elements of: Mounted Infantry; Camel Corps; 13th Sudanese Infantry; 14th Sudanese Infantry; 14th Egyptian Infantry; Arab Battalion	Fur Army

Strength
2,000 all ranks	4,000–6,000 riflemen; Irregular spearmen

Casualties and losses
5+ dead; 23+ wounded (recorded)	231+ dead; 1,096+ wounded

The invasion of Darfur was the invasion and occupation of the Sultanate of Darfur by the British Empire and the Sultanate of Egypt from 16 March to 6 November 1916. The Sultan of Darfur, Ali Dinar, had been reinstated by the British after their victory in the Mahdist War but during the First World War refused the customary tribute to the Anglo-Egyptian Sudan (Sudanese government) and in 1915 favoured the Ottoman Empire.

Reginald Wingate, the sirdar (commander-in-chief of the British-controlled Egyptian Army) organised a force of around 2,000 men (Lieutenant-Colonel Philip Kelly). The force entered Darfur in March 1916, decisively defeated the Fur Army at Beringia and occupied the capital al-Fashir in May.

Ali Dinar had fled to the mountains and his attempts to negotiate surrender were eventually broken off by the British. A small force was sent after him and the Sultan was killed in action in November 1916. Darfur was annexed to the British administration of the Anglo-Egyptian Sudan and remained a part of Sudan on its independence.

== Background ==
In the late 19th and early 20th centuries, Darfur, which means "land of the Fur", was an independent country, located to the west of Sudan and east of what was then French Equatorial Africa. It is comparable in size to France and can be divided into three regions: a semi-arid region in the north, joining the Sahara desert; a central region divided in two by the Jebal Marra volcano, which rises 10,000 ft (3,000 m) above sea level that is surrounded by sand and rock plains to the east and west and a southern region which has a rich alluvial soil and a heavy annual rainfall.

The Sultanate of Darfur was one of the kingdoms across the centre of Africa. In 1874, it was invaded by its Islamic neighbours from the south, which resulted in the country being annexed by Egypt and joined with Turco-Egyptian Sudan (by this point under Ango-Egyptian control). This lasted until the Mahdist War (1881–1899), when Anglo-Egyptian suzerainty was temporarily curtailed by the forces of Muhammad Ahmad, until Anglo-Egyptian control of the region was re-established following the battle of Omdurman on 2 September 1898. In 1899, Ali Dinar became the sultan of Darfur with the approval of the Sirdar, Lord Kitchener, on the condition that he paid an annual tribute to the British. Relations between Dinar and the Anglo-Egyptians were assisted by the Inspector-General, Rudolf Carl von Slatin, who had knowledge of the Darfur region and its people.

The status quo remained until disputes started over Darfur's western boundary and who had "overlordship" over its frontier districts. The British believed the delay in resolving these disputes, along with anti-government propaganda, led to a change in Dinar's attitude towards them. Their beliefs were not helped by Dinar's refusal to allow Europeans to enter Darfur. Dinar's domestic policies caused internal unrest among the Arab portion of the population who were generally against him or in the case of the Rizeigat tribe from the south-west Darfur, "openly hostile".

On hearing the news of war between the British Empire and Ottoman Empire, Dinar became more defiant and in April 1915 renounced his allegiance to the government of Anglo-Egyptian Sudan, declaring himself pro-Ottoman and making contact with them via the Senussi. Darfur had a population of just under 1,000,000 people, controlled by what was described as a "slave army" of about 10,000 men. (Note: In 1903, the Fur Army was estimated to be 1,700 cavalry and 6,000 infantry arranged into divisions but a report prepared just prior to the expedition claimed the numbers had shrunk to 5,000 men.) By December, affairs had deteriorated to such an extent that a small unit from the Egyptian Camel Corps was dispatched to protect trade at Nahud, and at the same time act as a warning against Dinar's proposed offensive against the Rizeigats. Dinar countered the deployment of the Camel Corps detachment by moving forty cavalry and ninety infantry to reinforce Jebel el Hella. By then the British believed he was preparing for an invasion of Sudan.

During these events, Darfurian forces, following the Ottoman declaration of jihad, made incursions into French Chad, threatened British Borno (Northern Nigeria), and attempted to incite a rebellion in Kordofan (British Sudan).

== Invasion ==
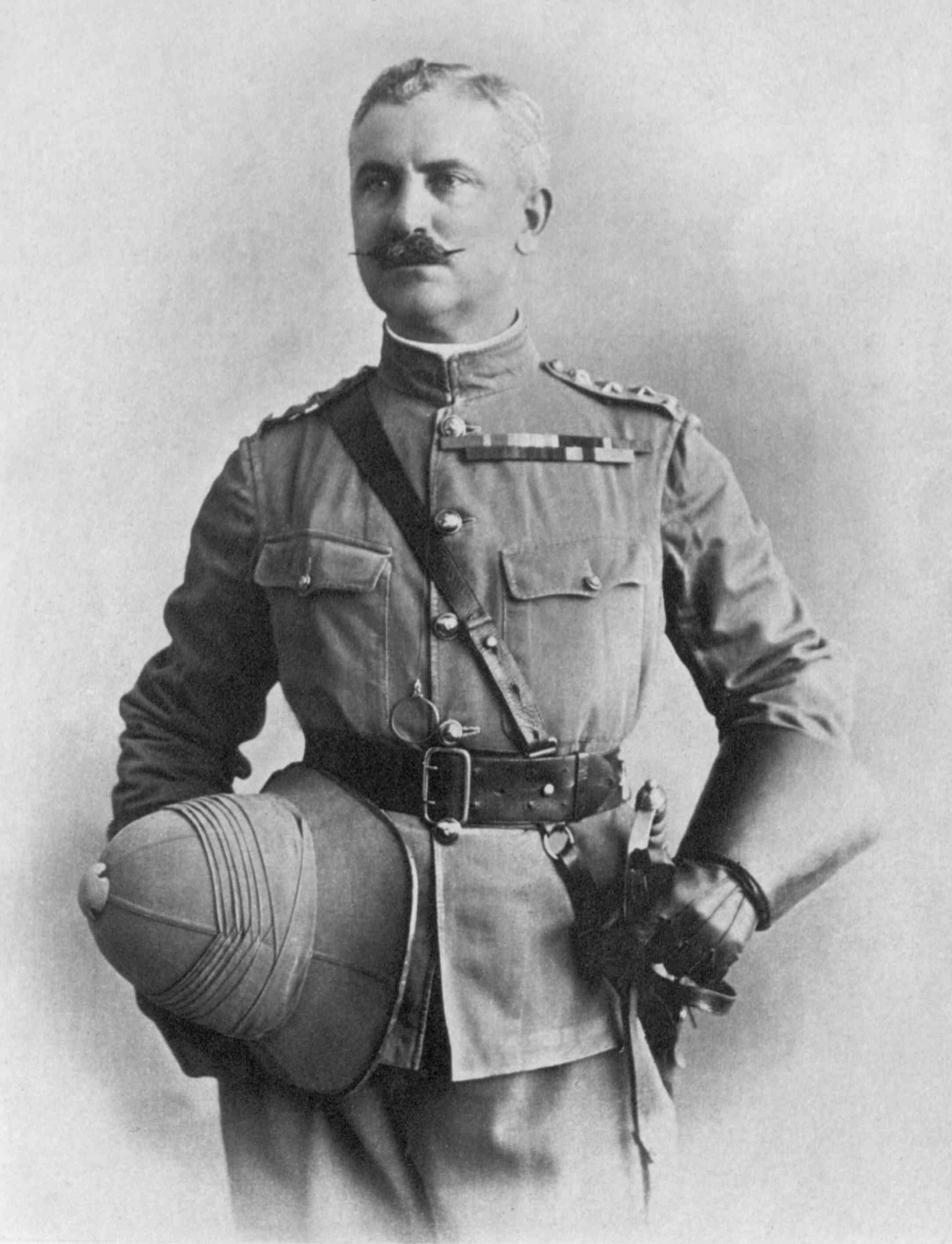
The Sirdar, Reginald Wingate

To counter the expected threat to Sudan, Sirdar Reginald Wingate gathered the Darfur Field Force together at Nahud. The commander was British Lieutenant Colonel Philip Kelly, of the 3rd The King's Own Hussars, on secondment to the Egyptian Army. The force was composed of

- Two companies of mounted infantry, commanded by Major Cobden, 9th Lancers
- Five companies from the Camel Corps, commanded by Major Huddleston, Dorsetshire Regiment
- Six companies from the 13th and 14th Battalions, Sudanese Infantry, commanded by Major Bayly, Royal Welsh Fusiliers and Major Darwell, Royal Marine Light Infantry
- Two companies from the Arab Battalion, commanded by Major Cowan, Cameron Highlanders
- Two companies from the 14th Battalion, Egyptian Infantry
- Two 12-pounder artillery batteries, which also included two Maxim machine-guns, commanded by Major Spinks Royal Artillery
- One Maxim machine gun battery.

With medical and other non-combat units, the force amounted to about 2,000 men. Intelligence supported the theory that Dinar was going to invade Sudan, so in March 1916, Wingate ordered Kelly to cross the border and occupy Jebel el Hella and Um Shanga. The two villages offered the only permanent water supplies that were on the road to al-Fashir, Dinar's capital.

On 16 March, five companies from the Camel Corps and mounted infantry scouts, supported by a 12-pounder artillery battery and a Maxim machine-gun battery, crossed the Darfur frontier and four days later occupied Um Shanga. Their only opposition was from a small observation post which was forced to withdraw. Unexpectedly, upon arrival, the Anglo-Egyptian force found the water supply at Um Shanga scarce. With the main body of his force expected to arrive that evening, having only two days' supply of water with them, Kelly considered withdrawing to Sudan. Instead, he divided his force, forming a fast-moving column, consisting of thirty mounted infantry scouts, 240 men from the Camel Corps, two field guns and eight Maxims, which left for Jebel el Hella at dawn on 22 March.

=== Jebel el Hella ===
Kelly's flying column faced only slight opposition from Fur scouts until they reached a position 4 mi (6.4 km) from Jebel el Hella. There, a force of 800 Fur horsemen tried to surround them and were only stopped by Anglo-Egyptian machine gun fire. Advancing a further 2 mi (3.2 km) the flying column located a large concentration of Fur troops in a wooded valley, where they engaged with artillery and machine-guns. Having forced the Fur troops to disperse, the column reached Jebel el Hella at 14:15 and secured its wells. A small reconnaissance party was dispatched by Kelly to check on the wells at Lugud two mi (3.2 km) away, which were occupied in strength, when the remainder of Kelly's force arrived on 26 March. During their advance, the Anglo-Egyptian casualties were described as "insignificant" while twenty of the Fur forces were dead or wounded. With the occupation of Jebel el Hella complete, the Anglo-Egyptians had secured one of the invasion routes into Sudan. The main Fur Army was now located in the capital of al-Fashir and was estimated to consist of 4,000 to 6,000 riflemen with adequate supplies of ammunition. Their equipment ranged from older muzzle loader weapons, Martini–Henry and Remington rifles and shotguns, to spears, shields and chain mail. They were supported by an unknown number of auxiliary troops armed only with spears. At the same time Dinar was concentrating his troops from other regions in the capital. Those in contact with the Anglo-Egyptian forces and some small number of reinforcements were instead grouped at Burush and Kedada.

=== Supply problems ===
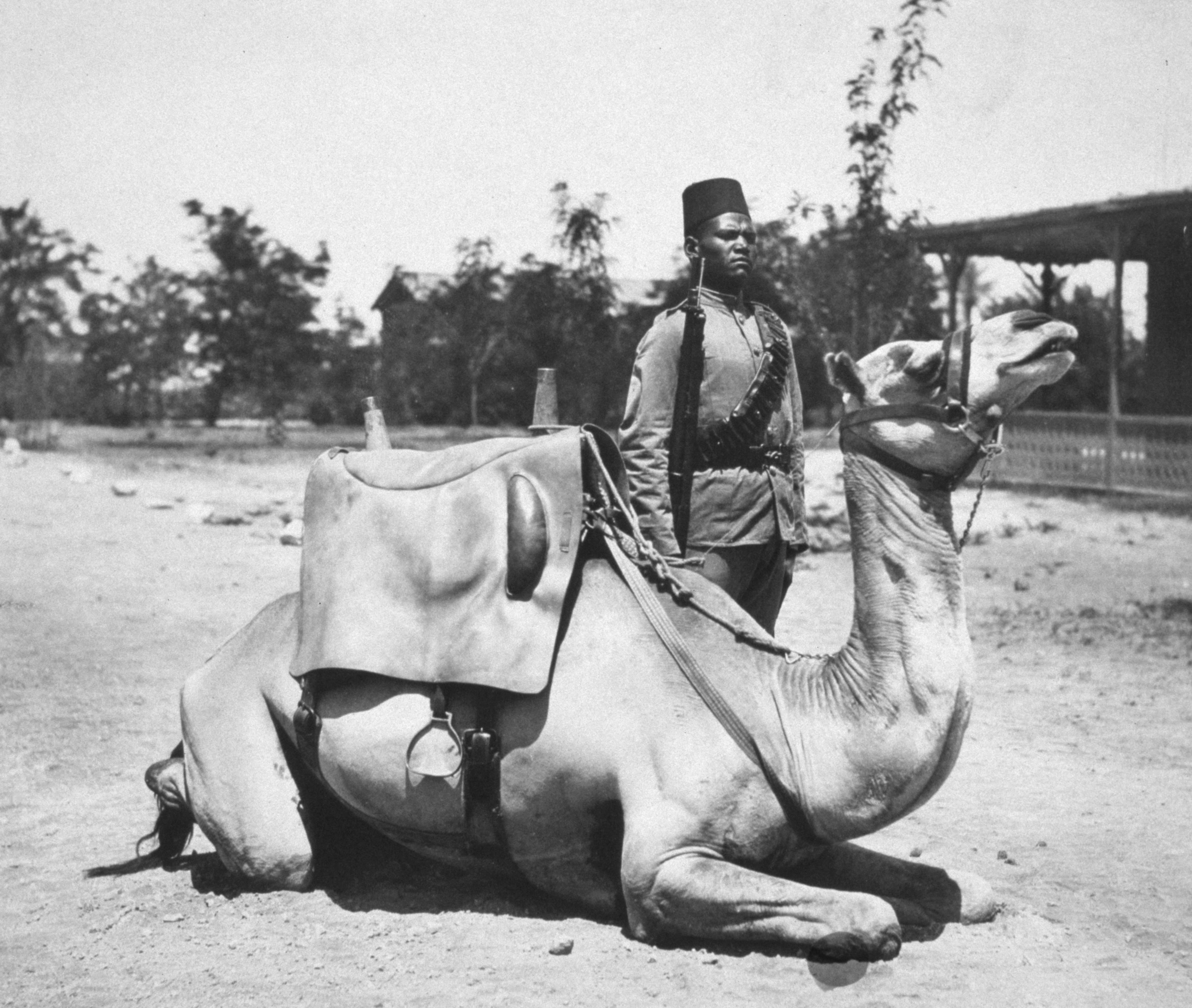
An Anglo-Egyptian camel soldier

Wingate believed that Dinar would avoid a large battle in the provinces, but would instead gather his troops at al-Fashir, until the rainy period started, which would benefit their style of guerrilla fighting and raids on the Anglo-Egyptian column and their lines of communication. Kelly's immediate concern was providing water and other supplies to his troops. The Anglo-Egyptian expedition coincided with a period of no rainfall and once all the native food supplies had been used, their nearest supply point was the railhead at El Obeid 300 mi (480 km) to the west. To overcome some of their supply problems, Wingate started construction of a road suitable for trucks, which he had obtained to supplement his camel transport. The road would stretch from the rail line at Rahad to Taweisha then on to the capital of al-Fashir, about 460 mi (740 km). Once completed, a journey on the road by vehicles, from the rail line to the capital, would take four days. General Sir Archibald Murray, commander of the Egyptian Expeditionary Force, fighting the Sinai and Palestine Campaign, arranged for the Royal Flying Corps (RFC) to send a flight of four aeroplanes, 15-pounder field guns and ammunition, wireless sets and light transport vehicles, to assist the expedition.

=== April reconnaissance ===
In early April, Anglo-Egyptian reconnaissance patrols located small numbers of Fur troops at Burush, Um Eisheishat and Um Kedda. To the south, the Fur troops deployed at Taweisha were withdrawn to Tulu. Kelly ordered a large reconnaissance force to head west to Abiad. They had three objectives, to find water for their men and animals, disperse any Fur troops at Burush and Um Kedada and deny the Fur forces the water at Abiad. The route between Nahud and al-Fashir was also to be secured. On 3 April, the Anglo-Egyptian force, consisting of two mounted infantry companies, four gund, six Maxim machine-guns and the 13th Sudanese Battalion, reached Burush by noon, forcing out a Fur cavalry unit. The next day they continued their advance towards Um Kedada. This time they met a Fur force of 700 men, some entrenched in front of the wells. The Anglo-Egyptian field guns opened fire on them forcing them to withdraw.

Four days later, on 8 April, the Anglo-Egyptian reconnaissance continued, reaching Abiad early the next day only to find that the Fur troops had left the previous evening. Leaving four Sudanese infantry companies and four field guns behind, the force reconnoitred deeper into Darfur. The garrison left behind at Abiad was attacked on 14 and 15 April, but casualties are not recorded. By the end of the month the lines of communication road was secured, with large detachments of Anglo-Egyptian troops left at Abiad, Um Kedada, Burush, Lugud, Jebel el Hella and Um Shanga. At the same time a system of observation posts was established along the frontier from Gabr el Dar to Shebb manned by 260 friendly Darfurians, who were issued with Remington rifles. Another 200 men belonging to the Kababish tribe occupied Jebel Meidob, observing the road from Darfur to the Senussi lands in the north.

=== May advance to contact ===
In May, the Anglo-Egyptian forces started reinforcing their lines of communication and bringing forward supplies to enable them to continue the advance. On 5 May, a force of 500 men attacked the Anglo-Egyptian garrison at Abiad and four days later the telegraph post 3 mi (4.8 km) east of Abiad was attacked. On 12 May, an RFC reconnaissance aircraft flew over al-Fashir dropping leaflets to the population. The leaflets denounced Dinar and promised that once he was removed there would be religious freedom, justice for all, that the tribal leaders would remain in position if they submitted and there would be an end to repression.

By 14 May Kelly had completed his preparations to advance to al-Fashir and had gathered a force at Abiad consisting of sixty mounted infantry scouts, four companies from the Camel Corps with two Maxim machine-guns of their own, eight companies from the 13th and 14th Sudanese Infantry and the Arab Battalion. They were supported by eight field guns, fourteen Maxim machine-guns and a field hospital. Still suffering from a shortage of water, Kelly divided the force into two columns. "A" Column would be slow moving, while "B" Column would be more mobile. They would rendezvous 40 mi (64 km) west of Abiad and 28 mi (45 km) from the village of Meliet, which had a well-known supply of water. Reconnaissance patrols had located a small Fur garrison at Meliet and Kelly made that his first objective. Once Meliet had been captured the Anglo-Egyptians would be well positioned to attack the capital, al-Fashir.

Just after 04:00 on 15 May, a small unit of mounted infantry scouts, captured a Fur observation post 2 mi (3.2 km) from Abiad, taking prisoner all bar two of the Fur soldiers, who managed to escape on foot. The slow moving "A" Column left Abiad on 15 May followed by the "B" Column the next day. Both columns reached the rendezvous on 17 May. The same morning an RFC reconnaissance aircraft bombed a force of around 500 Fur troops at Meliat. The next day the columns reached the village, which had been evacuated by the Fur troops, leaving some of their supplies behind. On 19 May, RFC reconnaissance aircraft reported there was no trace of Fur troops within 15 mi (24 km). The Anglo-Egyptian force was exhausted from their cross country march and rested at Meliat.

=== Battle of Beringia ===
Sketch of the battlefield of Beringia. Darfur's troops had entrenched themselves south of the British.

At 05:30 am on 22 May, the Anglo-Egyptian advance continued but the country, mainly of rolling low sand-hills, with plenty of concealed ground and scattered bushes, reduced visibility to just a few hundred yards. From the start, large groups of Fur cameliers and cavalry were observed. Kelly formed an advance guard of the mounted infantry, a camel company and four Maxim machine-guns. At 10:30, the Fur troops were observed in a strong entrenched position around the village of Beringia.

The Fur Army commander, Ramadan Ali, had established a 2,000 yd (1,800 m) crescent shaped trench, mostly concealed from the advancing Anglo-Egyptians by a wadi. Ali's plan was for them advance close enough for him to ambush them with his trench system, believing that his larger force would overrun their artillery and machine-guns before they could cause any serious damage to his troops.

The Anglo-Egyptian artillery opened fire on the Fur trenches, driving the Fur troops back. To the Anglo-Egyptian left Fur horsemen were seen gathering and they were also engaged by the artillery at a range of 1,600 yd (1,500 m). The Anglo-Egyptians formed square and advanced 800 yd (730 m), then started digging trenches. The advance guard were ordered to man a higher position to the right front and south-west of the square. To counter a threat from Fur cavalry from his left, Kelly sent a Camel Corps company and a Maxim machine gun section to secure the higher ground there.

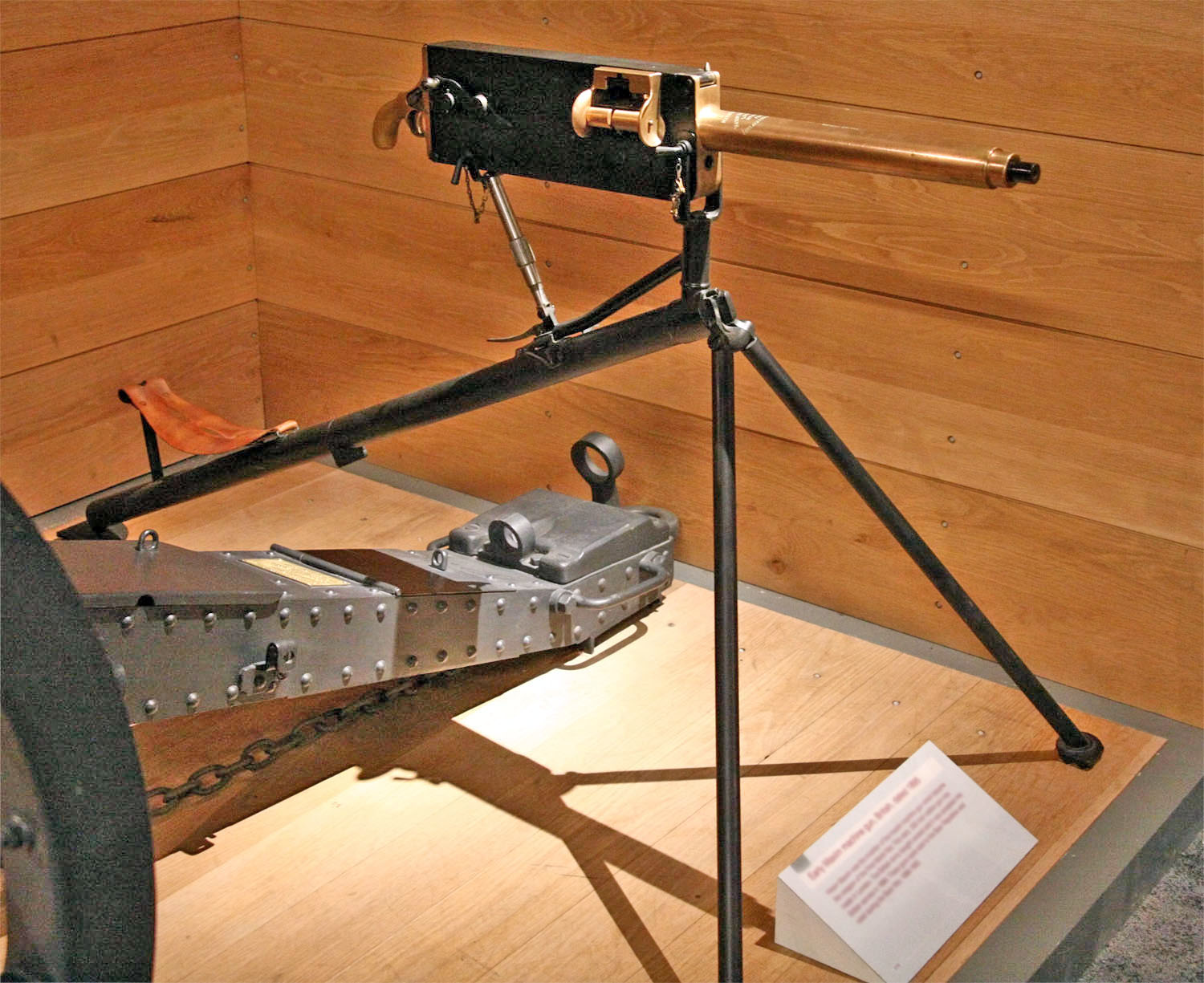
British tripod-mounted Maxim machine gun

The Anglo-Egyptian forces were established 500 yd (460 m) from Beringia. The main Fur Army position was 600 yd (550 m) south of the village, extending for 1,000 yd (910 m) to the east and west in a semi-circle. Kelly's scouts could not get into a position to see all of the Fur Army positions so Kelly made the decision to launch an immediate attack. While he was organising the assault, Huddleston, commanding the Camel Corps company escorting the artillery and machine-guns on the right of the square, exceeded his orders and entered the village. Exiting to the south they came under heavy fire from the Fur defenders and were forced to withdraw, pursued by some of the Fur troops. When they came within range of the Anglo-Egyptian square, their artillery and machine-guns opened fire on their open flank. Seeing this, the remainder of the Fur Army left their trenches and attacked the southern side of the square in strength.

The south of the square was manned from left to right by an artillery battery, three infantry companies, another artillery battery, one infantry company and a Maxim section. There was then a gap of around 150 yards (140 m) before another infantry company and a Maxim section were positioned facing east. Kelly now reinforced the south of the square with two Maxim sections and a company from the Arab Battalion. The Fur attack lasted around forty minutes, but it eventually failed and the nearest they got to the square was around 10 yd (9.1 m). (Note: MacGregor claims there attack had got within 6 yd (5.5 m).) Kelly ordered an infantry counter-attack, supported by his artillery, with the Maxim guns advancing alongside the infantry. The Fur Army broke and the survivors retreated, leaving 231 dead, ninety-six seriously wounded and another 1,000 less seriously wounded behind, from a force of over 3,600. (Note: Daly gives the number of dead as 261.) Anglo-Egyptian casualties were four officers wounded, five other ranks dead and eighteen wounded. At 16:00, Kelly resumed his advance to al-Fashir stopping for the night just short of the capital.

A force of 500 cavalry and 300 infantry attacked the Anglo-Egyptian camp at 03:00 on 23 May. Kelly's artillery opened fire with starshells, lighting up the battleground. The attack was defeated; Fur casualties are not known but the only Anglo-Egyptian casualty was a wounded gunner. Later that day, at 06:00 the Anglo-Egyptians were just about to break camp, when several hundred Fur troops appeared on their left flank. They were engaged and forced to withdraw by artillery, machine gun fire and aerial bombardment. At 10:00, Kelly and his mounted troops entered the capital, finding it deserted except for some women. Sultan Ali Dinar had left al-Fashir accompanied by 2,000 troops after hearing about the defeat at Beringia. Captured in the city were four artillery pieces, 55,000 rounds of small arms ammunition and 4,000 rifles.

=== Dibbis and Kulme ===
Sultan Ali Dinar, fled to the Jebel Marra mountains 50 mi (80 km) to the south-west of al-Fashir, with around 2,000 men; Kelly's troops were unable to immediately pursue him, due to a lack of supplies and exhaustion. (Note: Daly claims he fled accompanied only by a "small retinue".) Dinar approached the Anglo Egyptians offering to discuss surrender terms. Discussions continued until 1 August, when Kelly broke off the talks, as it had become apparent that Dinar was prevaricating. Dinar's followers had started to desert him and at that point he was only left with around 1,000 men. Kelly's troops had occupied Kebkebia 80 mi (130 km) west of al-Fashir. Huddleston, with the Camel Corps troops and men from the 13th Sudanese Infantry, two field guns and four Maxim machine-guns — 200 men in total — were sent to occupy Dibbis 110 mi (180 km) south-west of al-Fashir. They reached Dibbis on 13 October, engaging a Fur force of 150 riflemen and 1,000 men armed with spears, defeating them after a short fight. Following this, Dinar once again approached the Anglo Egyptians to discuss terms, when it appeared Dinar was delaying, Kelly dispatched 100 men from the 13th Sudanese Infantry to reinforce Huddleston.

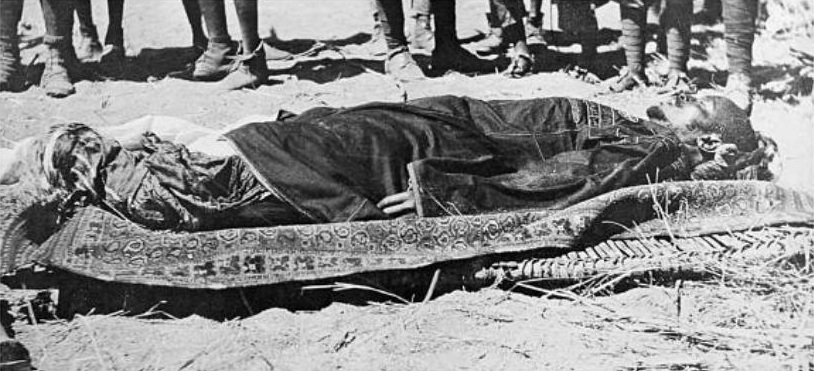
The body of Ali Dinar, November 1916

Huddleston discovered Dinar was in hiding at Kulme 50 mi (80 km) to the west. The remaining Fur troops were in a poor condition, hungry and diseased and little resistance was expected to Huddleston's troops. Without waiting for reinforcements Huddleston marched on Kulme. Occupying the village almost unopposed on 3 November, they captured several hundred prisoners and most of Dinar's remaining military stores. Some of his immediate family also surrendered. Dinar, avoiding battle, fled to Jebel Juba to the south-west of Kulme. Two days later, on 5 November, Huddleston, with 150 men, a field gun and four Maxim machine-guns mounted on captured horses, set off in pursuit. Huddleston reached Dinar's camp on 6 November and opened fire at a range of 500 yd (460 m). The Fur troops fled, followed by Huddleston's force, around one mi (1.6 km) from the Fur camp. Huddleston's troops discovered the body of Dinar shot through the head.

== Aftermath ==
On 1 November 1917, Darfur was incorporated into Sudan. The £500,000 bill for the cost of the expedition was sent to the Egyptian Government in Cairo for payment by Egyptian taxpayers. The British commanders of the operation were also recognised. In 1917, Wingate became the British High Commissioner for Egypt. Kelly, became the first Governor of the Darfur province with his office in the Sultan's palace throne room until May 1917. Kelly was promoted to brigadier general and given command of the 5th Mounted Brigade, which was part of the Australian Mounted Division fighting in Palestine.

== See also ==
- War in Darfur, the rebellion of Darfur against the Sudanese government (2003–2020)
- Darfur campaign, theatre in the Sudanese civil war (2023–present)

== Sources ==
- Crowder, Michael (1985). General history of Africa. Vol. VII. Paris: Unesco. ISBN 92-3-101-713-6.
- Daly, Martin William (2010). Darfur's Sorrow: The Forgotten History of a Humanitarian Disaster. Cambridge: Cambridge University Press. ISBN 978-1-139-78849-6.
- MacGregor, Andrew James (2006). A Military History of Modern Egypt: From the Ottoman Conquest to the Ramadan War. Praeger Security International. Westport, CT: Greenwood Publishing Group. ISBN 978-0-275-98601-8.
- MacMunn, G; Falls, C. (1996) [1928]. Military Operations: Egypt and Palestine, From the Outbreak of War with Germany to June 1917. History of the Great War Based on Official Documents By Direction of the Historical Section of the Committee of Imperial Defence. Vol. I (repr. Battery Press Nashville, TN ed.). London: HMSO. ISBN 978-0-89839-241-8.
- Niblock, Tim (1987). Class and Power in Sudan: The Dynamics of Sudanese Politics, 1898–1985. SUNY Press. ISBN 978-0-88706-481-4.
- Preston, Richard Martin (1921). The Desert Mounted Corps: An Account of the Cavalry Operations in Palestine and Syria, 1917–1918. London: Constable. OCLC 558489607 – via Archive Foundation.
- Vaughan, Chris (2015). Darfur, Colonial Violence, Sultanic Legacies & Local Politics, 1916–1956. Eastern African Series: Darfur. Woodbridge: James Currey. ISBN 978-1-84701-111-4.
