= Abiad =

Abiad is a surname. Notable people with the surname include:

- Fouad Abiad (born 1978), Canadian bodybuilder
- Kate Peterson Abiad (born 1969), American basketball coach

== See also ==
- Al-Ubaid (disambiguation) (includes Obeid and others)
