= Battle of Kahe =

Battle in East Africa during World War I

- Part of East African Campaign
Date	18 March 1916
Location	Kahe, German East Africa 3°29′30″S 37°26′20″E
Result	British victory

Belligerents
German Empire: German East Africa	British Empire

Commanders and leaders
Hans Von Kruggenmeyer	General Sheppard

Strength
200	5000

Casualties and losses
66 killed 20 captured	210 killed
- Location within Kenya Battle of Kahe (Africa)

The Battle of Kahe was fought during the East African Campaign of World War I. It was the last action between German and Entente forces before the German retreat from the Kilimanjaro area. British and South African forces surrounded German positions at Kahe, south of Mount Kilimanjaro. Entente forces inflicted considerable casualties and captured large German artillery pieces but also suffered more casualties in return. German forces retreated from there, further into the interior of the colony.
