= Philip James Vandeleur Kelly =

British Army general (1878–1948)

Brigadier-General Philip James Vandeleur Kelly CMG DSO
- Born: 1 September 1878; Rangoon, Burma
- Died: 1948 (aged 69–70)
- Military career
- Allegiance: United Kingdom
- Branch: British Army
- Service years: 1897–1945
- Rank: Brigadier-General
- Commands: Anglo Egyptian Darfur Expedition; 5th Mounted Brigade; 13th Cavalry Brigade; 14th West Riding Battalion, Home Guard
- Conflicts: First World War: Anglo Egyptian Darfur Expedition; Sinai and Palestine campaign; Second World War

Philip James Vandeleur Kelly CMG DSO (1878–1948) was a cavalry officer and a brigadier-general of the British Army.

== Biography ==
Kelly of Castle Connell, County Limerick, Ireland, graduated from the Royal Military College, Sandhurst, on 3 May 1898 and joined the 3rd (The King's Own) Hussars as a second lieutenant the following day. He was promoted to lieutenant on 17 January 1900, and was stationed with his regiment at Lucknow and Bengal in India. The regiment had moved to Sialkot in the Punjab by the time he was promoted to captain on 21 January 1903. Eight years later, he was seconded to the Egyptian Army and as a captain was awarded the Imperial Ottoman Order of the Medjidieh, Fourth Class. This was followed by a second foreign award the Order of the Nile, Third Class on 20 June 1916. As a lieutenant-colonel he was given command of the Anglo Egyptian Darfur Expedition and following its successful conclusion was awarded a British Distinguished Service Order, and made a Knight Commander of the Order of Saint Michael and Saint George both in 1917.

He next served as the brigade commander of both the 5th Mounted and the 13th Cavalry Brigades, during the Sinai and Palestine campaign. His last military post was as commanding officer of the 14th West Riding Battalion, Home Guard during the Second World War. Philip James Vandeleur Kelly died in 1948.
