= Fouad Abiad =

Canadian professional bodybuilder

Personal information
- Born: October 15, 1978 (age 47) Windsor, Ontario, Canada
- Website: Official website

Sport
- Sport: Bodybuilding

Fouad "Hoss" Abiad (Arabic: فؤاد ابيض; born 15 October 1978) is a retired Canadian-French IFBB professional bodybuilder. He earned IFBB Pro League status by winning the super-heavyweight division and overall titles of the Canadian Championships in 2006. He made his first appearance as a professional at that year’s Atlantic City Pro, finishing in 15th place. He ultimately competed in the 2008 Mr. Olympia.

He won two contests in 2015 — the Orlando Show of Champions and the Vancouver Pro. He also placed second at the Tampa Pro that year to winner Maxx Charles. Abiad’s last contest was the 2017 Arnold Classic, where he placed sixth overall. His focus eventually shifted to launching his supplement brand, Hosstile, and promoting contests in Canada. He is also known as the host of various podcasts. He has also performed commentary.

== Contest history ==
=== 2006 ===
- Canadian National Championships - Overall Champion
- IFBB Atlantic Pro - Open, 15th

=== 2007 ===
- IFBB Montreal Pro - Open, 5th
- IFBB Atlantic City - Open, 8th

=== 2008 ===
- IFBB Europa Supershow - Open, 3rd
- IFBB Houston Pro Invitational - Open, 7th
- IFBB Tampa Bay Pro - Open, 5th
- IFBB Mr. Olympia - Open, 17th

=== 2011 ===
- Arnold Sports Festival|Arnold Classic - Open, 12th
- IFBB Flex Pro - Open, 3rd

=== 2012 ===
- IFBB Flex Pro - Open, 3rd
- Arnold Classic - Open, 11th

=== 2013 ===
- Arnold Classic - Open, 10th
- IFBB Toronto Pro - Open, 2nd

=== 2014 ===
- IFBB Europa Supershow - Open, 2nd

=== 2015 ===
- IFBB Europa Supershow - Open, 1st
- IFBB Vancouver Pro - Open, 1st
- IFBB Tampa Pro - Open, 2nd

=== 2016 ===
- IFBB Toronto Pro - Open, 3rd

=== 2017 ===
- Arnold Classic - Open, 6th

== Personal life ==
Abiad is of Lebanese and French descent. Abiad holds both Lebanese and French citizenship.

In 2023, he cited the kidney struggles he faced during his time competing and his fear of being put on dialysis in the future as the main reasons that pushed him to retirement.
