= Kahe, Tanzania =

Wards in Kilimanjaro Region, Tanzania

Coordinates: 3.5°S 37.433°E

Kahe is a group of wards in Moshi Rural District, Kilimanjaro Region, northeastern Tanzania. It is located 23 kilometres (14 mi) southeast of Moshi, north of the Nyumba ya Mungu Dam, and a few kilometers from the border with Kenya. There are 11 towns, including Oria Village.

The population of Kahe is approximately 28,000 people. It is a low socio-economic area. There are nine primary schools.
