= USS Washington (ACR-11) =

United States Navy Tennessee-class armored cruiser

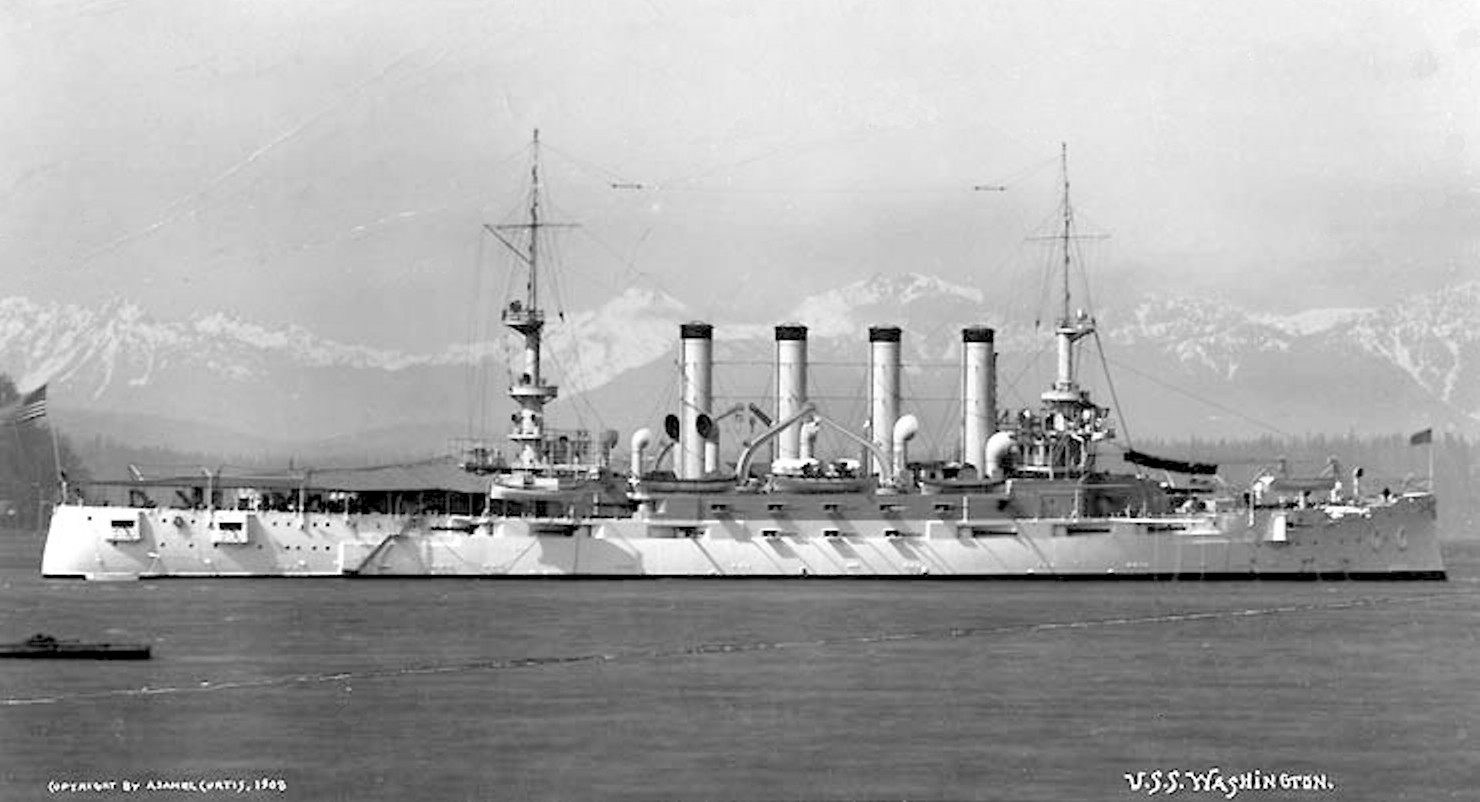
- USS Washington (ACR-11) off Seattle, Washington, with the Olympic Mountains in the distance, 1908.

History

United States
- Name: Washington (1903–1916); Seattle (1916–1946)
- Namesake: State of Washington; City of Seattle, Washington
- Ordered: 1 July 1902
- Awarded: 10 February 1903
- Builder: New York Shipbuilding Corporation, Camden, New Jersey
- Cost: $4,035,000 (contract price of hull and machinery)
- Laid down: 23 September 1903
- Launched: 18 March 1905
- Sponsored by: Miss Helen Stewart Wilson
- Commissioned: 7 August 1906
- Decommissioned: 28 June 1946
- Renamed: Seattle, 9 November 1916
- Reclassified: CA-11, 17 July 1920; "Unclassified", 1 July 1931; IX-39, 17 February 1941
- Stricken: 19 July 1946
- Identification: Hull symbol: ACR-11; Hull symbol: CA-11; Hull symbol: IX-39
- Fate: Sold for scrap 3 December 1946

General characteristics (as built)
- Class & type: Tennessee-class armored cruiser
- Displacement: 14,500 long tons (14,733 t) (standard); 15,712 long tons (15,964 t) (full load)
- Length: 504 ft 5 in (153.75 m) oa; 502 ft (153 m) pp
- Beam: 72 ft 10 1/2 in (22.212 m)
- Draft: 25 ft (7.6 m) (mean)
- Installed power: 16 × Babcock & Wilcox boilers; 23,000 ihp (17,000 kW)
- Propulsion: 2 × vertical triple expansion reciprocating engines; 2 × screws
- Speed: 22 knots (41 km/h; 25 mph); 22.27 knots (41.24 km/h; 25.63 mph) (Speed on Trial)
- Complement: 83 officers 804 enlisted 64 Marines
- Armament: 4 × 10 in (250 mm)/40 caliber Mark 3 breech-loading rifles (2x2); 16 × 6 in (150 mm)/50 caliber Mark 8 breech-loading rifles; 22 × 3 in (76 mm)/50 caliber rapid-fire guns; 4 × 3-pounder (47 mm (1.9 in)) Driggs-Schroeder saluting guns; 4 × 21 inch (533 mm) submerged torpedo tubes
- Armor: Belt: 5 in (13 cm); Deck: 1 1/2–4 in (38–102 mm) (amidships); 3 in (76 mm) (forward & aft); Barbettes: 4–7 in (100–180 mm); Turrets: 5–9 in (130–230 mm); Conning Tower: 9 in (230 mm)

General characteristics (1921)
- Armament: 4 × 10 in (250 mm)/40 caliber Mark 3 breech-loading rifles (2×2); 16 × 6 in (150 mm)/50 caliber Mark 8 breech-loading rifles; 2 × 3 in (76 mm)/50 caliber anti-aircraft guns; 4 × 6-pounder (57 mm (2.2 in)) Driggs-Schroeder saluting guns; 4 × 21 in (530 mm) submerged torpedo tubes

General characteristics (1935)
- Armament: 4 × 10 in (250 mm)/40 caliber Mark 3 breech-loading rifles (2×2); 4 × 6 in (150 mm)/50 caliber Mark 8 breech-loading rifles (on board) (12 × in reserve); 12 × 3 in (76 mm)/50 caliber anti-aircraft guns (in reserve); 2 × 6-pounder (57 mm (2.2 in)) Driggs-Schroeder saluting guns (in reserve); 4 × 21 in (530 mm) submerged torpedo tubes

The seventh USS Washington (ACR-11/CA-11/IX-39), also referred to as "Armored Cruiser No. 11", and renamed Seattle and reclassified CA-11 and IX-39, was a United States Navy Tennessee-class armored cruiser. Commissioned in 1906, renamed in 1916, and not decommissioned until 1946, she spent periods of time in reserve. She was used for escort duties during World War I, and as a receiving ship during World War II.

== Pre-World War I ==
The ship was laid down on 23 September 1903 at Camden, New Jersey, by the New York Shipbuilding Corporation, launched on 18 March 1905, sponsored by Miss Helen Stewart Wilson, daughter of United States Senator John L. Wilson of Washington state, and commissioned at the Philadelphia Navy Yard on 7 August 1906, Captain James D. Adams in command.

=== 1906–1908 ===
Washington was fitted out at Philadelphia until 1 November 1906, when she got underway for Hampton Roads, whence she departed a week later as an escort for Louisiana which was then carrying President Theodore Roosevelt to Panama for an inspection of progress of work constructing the Panama Canal. During that voyage, the armored cruiser touched at Hampton Roads and Piney Point, Maryland; Colón, Panama; Chiriquí Lagoon; and Mona Passage before she returned to Newport News on 26 November. She headed back toward the Delaware Capes on 8 December, arrived at the Philadelphia Navy Yard on the 11th, and remained there undergoing repairs into the spring of 1907.

Washington departed League Island on 11 April and arrived at Hampton Roads the next day. She remained there into May participating in festivities of the Jamestown Exposition which commemorated the founding of Jamestown, Virginia, in 1607. She returned northward soon thereafter, spending most of May undergoing docking and tests at the New York Navy Yard. She then shook down off Tompkinsville, New York (Staten Island), from 28 May to 5 June before she returned to Hampton Roads for further observances at the Jamestown Exposition.

Washington departed Hampton Roads on 11 June and proceeded via Bradford, Rhode Island, to Newport where she joined Tennessee before heading across the Atlantic on the 14th, bound for European waters. The sister ships visited the French ports of Royan, Île-d'Aix, La Pallice, and Brest from 23 June to 25 July, before returning to Tompkinsville in August to run speed trials.

Following those trials and a period of yard work at the New York Navy Yard, Washington set sail for the Pacific Station, again in company with Tennessee. The two armored cruisers subsequently called at Hampton Roads; Port of Spain, Trinidad; Rio de Janeiro, Brazil; Montevideo, Uruguay; Punta Arenas, Chile; Callao, Peru; Acapulco, Mexico; and Pichilinque Bay, Mexico; before they joined the Pacific Fleet in time to fire target practices with them at Magdalena Bay, Mexico, from late December 1907 to January 1908. Washington subsequently operated both in company with the Fleet and on independent tactical exercises out of Magdalena Bay into March, operating also off Santa Barbara, San Francisco, and San Diego, as well as San Pedro, California. Other ports visited by the armored cruiser into the summer of 1908 included Redondo Beach, Venice, Monterey, and Angel Island in California; and Port Townsend, Port Angeles, Seattle, Tacoma, and Bremerton in Washington. She was among the units of the Fleet reviewed by the Secretary of the Navy at San Francisco between 6 and 17 May.

=== 1909–1911 ===
Washington operated off the west coast into 1909 before she made preparations to sail in company with the Armored Cruiser Squadron to "show the flag" in the Far East. She accordingly got underway from San Francisco on 5 September 1909 and called, in succession, at Honolulu, Hawaii; from 10 to 20 September; and Nares Harbor, Admiralty Islands, where she coaled ship from 17 to 25 October, before she arrived at Manila, Philippine Islands, on 30 October.

After visiting Woosung (near Shanghai), China, from 14 to 30 December 1909, Washington and her sisters called at Yokohama, Japan, from 3 to 20 January 1910, and Honolulu from 31 January to 8 February, before returning to the west coast. Washington made port back at San Francisco via Port Discovery, Washington and Bremerton on 3 March. She then returned to Bremerton where she commenced a period of repairs on 21 March.

Washington next operated off the west coast into the autumn of 1910, holding target practices off Santa Cruz, California, before returning to San Francisco. She coaled ship at Tiburon, California, on 7–8 August before shifting to San Francisco to prepare for her next deployment. On 14 August, she departed San Francisco, bound for South America on the first leg of her voyage to the east coast to join the Atlantic Fleet. With the ships of the 1st Division of the Pacific Fleet, Washington visited Valparaíso, Chile, and took part in the observances of the Chilean Centennial Celebration from 10 to 23 September. She then resumed her voyage around South America, touching at Talcahauano and Punta Arenas, Chile; Rio de Janeiro; Carlisle Bay, Barbados; and St. Thomas, Danish West Indies; before she arrived at Culebra, Puerto Rico, on 2 November to prepare for target practice with the Fleet.

Washington's next area of operations was the Tidewater area of Virginia, especially Hampton Roads and Lynnhaven Bay, before the armored cruiser underwent repairs at the Norfolk Navy Yard from 20 December 1910 to 2 January 1911. The armored cruiser subsequently underwent another period of repairs at the Portsmouth Navy Yard before heading south with stores and material for delivery to the 5th Division of the Fleet in Cuban waters. She arrived at Guantánamo Bay on 20 March and remained there into the summer, conducting trials and exercises with the 5th Division. She then returned northward and stopped at Hampton Roads from 21 to 24 June before pushing on to New York, where she arrived on the 25th.

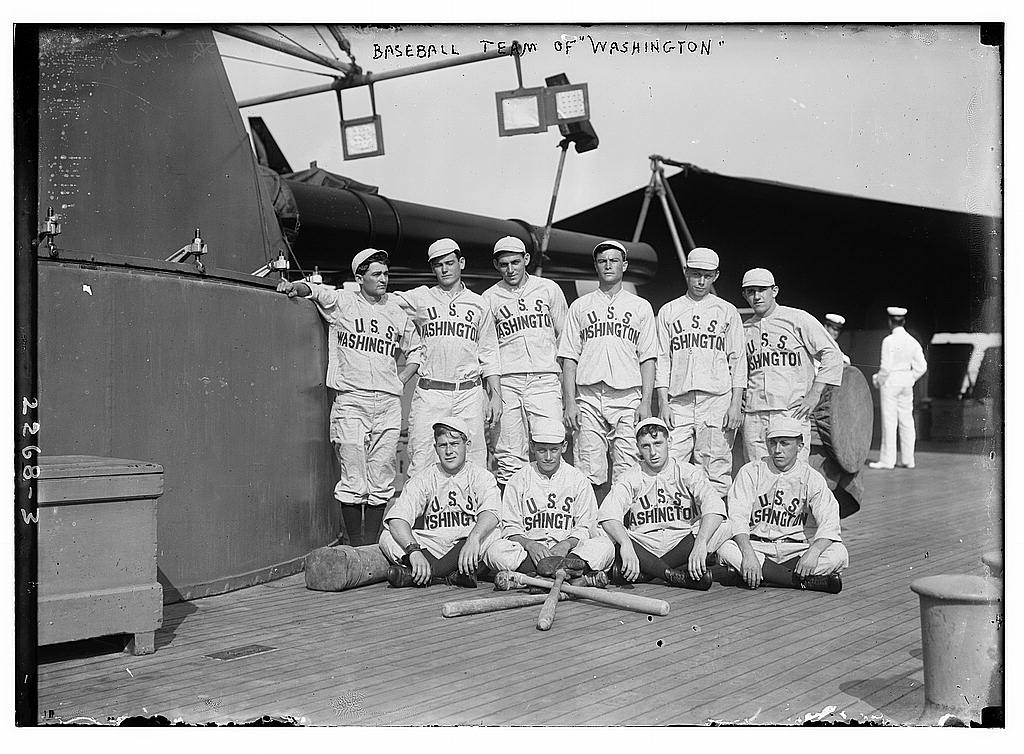
USS Washington baseball team in 1911

The armored cruiser operated off the northeastern seaboard through the summer of 1911, holding exercises and maneuvers in areas ranging from Cape Cod Bay to Hampton Roads. During that time, she cruised briefly with the Naval Militia from 19 to 21 July; acted as a reference ship for torpedo practice off Sandwich Island, Cape Cod, Massachusetts, on 2 August; witnessed the Delaware as that ship fired at the target hulk San Marcos (former USS Texas) on 27–28 August, and then conducted battle practice with the Fleet off the southern drill grounds. In early November, Washington was among the ships of the Fleet reviewed by President William Howard Taft.

The cruiser then participated in a search problem out of Newport, R.I. from 9 to 18 November before she sailed for the West Indies in company with North Carolina, arriving at Santo Domingo, Dominican Republic, on 26 November. Washington subsequently returned home to Hampton Roads in company with her sister ship and went into drydock at the Norfolk Navy Yard three days before Christmas of 1911.

=== 1912–1913 ===
After returning to the Fleet and participating in maneuvers in Guantánamo Bay, Cuba, in late January and early February 1912, Washington steamed back to the Norfolk Navy Yard where, between 13 and 19 February, she underwent special preparations to embark the Secretary of State and his party. The armored cruiser then shifted to Key West where she embarked the Secretary on 23 February. In the ensuing weeks, Washington carried Philander C. Knox and his guests to such ports as Colón, Panama; Port Limón, Costa Rica; Puerto Barrios, Guatemala; La Guaira, Venezuela; Santo Domingo; St. Thomas; Puerto Cabello, Venezuela; San Juan; Port-au-Prince; Guantánamo Bay; Kingston, Jamaica; and Havana, before disembarking her distinguished guests at Piney Point, Maryland, on 16 April.

The high point of the spring of 1912 for Washington was her service as temporary flagship for the Commander in Chief, Atlantic Fleet, while she was at the Philadelphia Navy Yard from 19 April to 3 May. The warship subsequently paused at New York from 9 to 12 May and at the Portsmouth Navy Yard for an inspection by the Board of Inspection and Survey for ships before she conducted maneuvers out of Provincetown and Newport and then received Rear Admiral Hugo Osterhaus, the Commander in Chief, Atlantic Fleet, aboard on 26 May. After shifting to Hampton Roads, Washington embarked a detachment of additional Marines on 27 May, took on stores; and set out that day for Key West. There, she awaited further orders from 30 May to 10 June, while President Taft concentrated a strong naval force there to prepare for possible action which might be required by internal problems in Cuba.

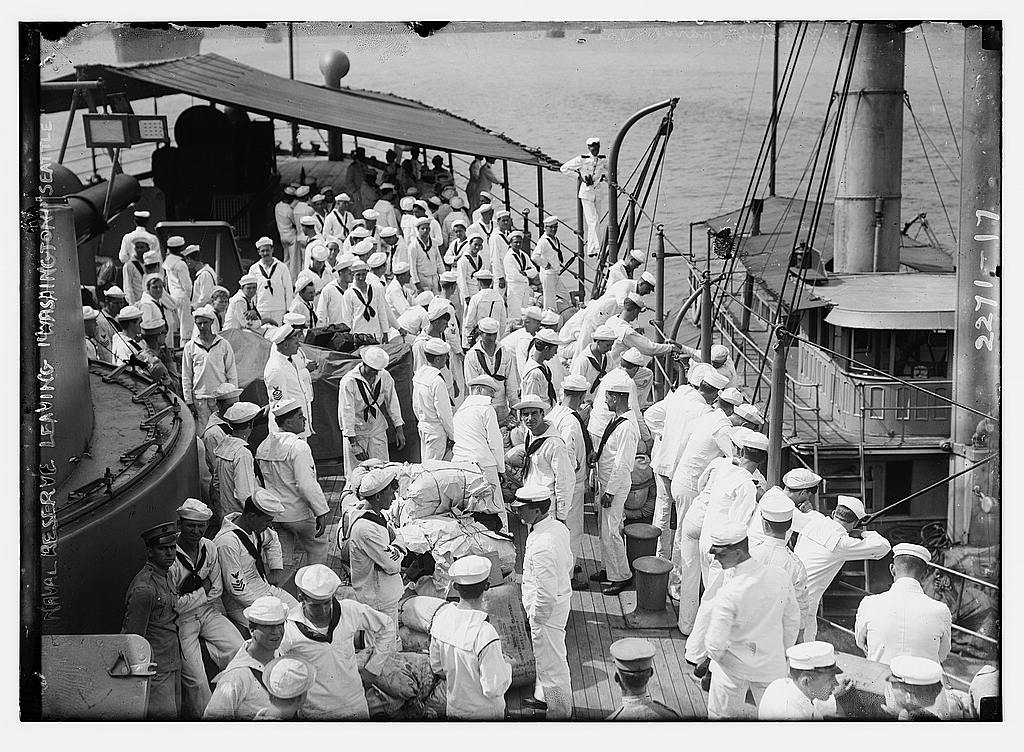
Naval reserve sailors disembarking the USS Washington.

In the late spring and early summer, a rebellion on that Caribbean island occasioned a show of force by the United States. Washington accordingly departed Key West on 10 June and arrived at Havana later that day. She remained there on "duty in connection with the Cuban rebellion" until 1 July, when she shifted to Guantánamo. The rebellion on the island was put down by the Cuban Government, resulting in the withdrawal of the American naval and marine representation there. Accordingly, Washington sailed to Hampton Roads, where she discharged her marines and equipment and went into "first reserve" at the Portsmouth Navy Yard on 9 July.

Washington remained inactive until 8 October, when she sailed for New York to participate in the Naval Review held there from 10 to 15 October and then resumed her reserve status at Portsmouth on 17 October. In early November, crew of the ship played against the 1912 New Hampshire football team in nearby Durham, New Hampshire. Shifted subsequently from Portsmouth to the New York Navy Yard, via President Roads, Boston, and Tompkinsville, Staten Island, Washington was assigned duty as receiving ship at the navy yard on 20 July 1913.

=== 1914 ===
The armored cruiser was placed in commission again on 23 April 1914, Captain Edward W. Eberle in command. Later that spring, the armored cruiser took aboard drafts of men from Norfolk and Port Royal, South Carolina, on 30 April and 2 May; touched at Key West, and proceeded to Santo Domingo.

Once again there was unrest in the Dominican Republic. A revolution in the northern province of Santiago, against the rule of Provisional President José Bordas Valdez, had been quelled; but one in the Puerto Plata Province, near the capital of Santo Domingo itself, continued unchecked and was marked by severe fighting, fighting so severe that "marked apprehension" existed in Washington.

On 1 May, Petrel had been ordered to Dominican waters, but a further show of force seemed to be in order. Accordingly, Washington was chosen to "show the flag" in those troubled waters. She departed Key West on 4 May and arrived at the beleaguered city of Puerto Plata on 6 May to protect American interests, joining the Petrel. Six days later, Captain Eberle invited representatives of both warring parties—the insurgents and the government—out to his ship, in an attempt to persuade both sides to come to an amicable settlement.

Unfortunately, the attempt failed, and the fighting continued. The insurgents were aided by a recent large consignment of guns and ammunition smuggled across the Haitian border that had given them new blood. The revolutionaries soon recaptured the key city of La Vega and were successfully holding Puerto Plata. Government forces, laying siege to that port and shelling the insurgents, clearly endangered the lives of the neutral citizens still living in the city. Captain Eberle objected to the bombardment and warned President Valdés repeatedly.

Washington departed Puerto Plata on 6 June with the conflict between the insurgents and the government of President Valdes still unresolved. Her place had been taken by Machias. Washington coaled ship and took on stores at Guantánamo Bay from 7 to 10 June before she sailed for Veracruz, Mexico. She then remained in Mexican waters from 14 to 24 June before she shifted to Cap-Haïtien, Haiti, to protect American interests there during an outbreak of violence that summer.

Washington remained at Cap-Haïtien into July. In the meantime, the situation in the Dominican Republic had worsened when government shellings of rebel positions in Puerto Plata resulted in an inevitable "incident". On 26 June, a stray shell killed an English woman in Puerto Plata causing the gunboat Machias to shift to a berth in the inner harbor and shell one of President Valdes' batteries, silencing it with a few well-placed shots. During early July, Machias again fired her guns in anger when stray shots hit the ship.

In view of those developments, Washington returned to Puerto Plata on 9 July and remained there into the autumn, keeping a vigil to protect American lives and property and standing by to land her landing force if the situation required it. That August, Captain Eberle's attempts to bring about a conference finally bore fruit. The United States government sent a commission consisting of John Franklin Fort, the former governor of New Jersey; James M. Sullivan, the American minister to Santo Domingo; and Charles Smith, a New Hampshire lawyer, to mediate a peace in the Dominican Republic.

Both sides ultimately accepted the American suggestions which provided for the establishment of a constitutional government and the institution of elections under United States "observation."

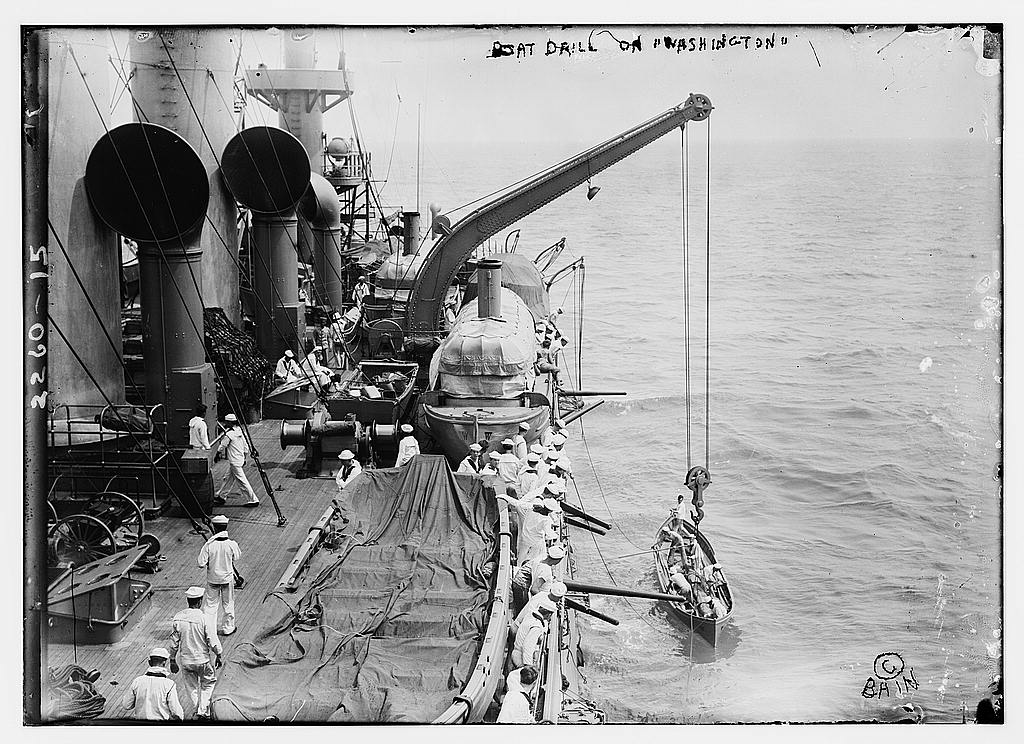
Boat drill on Washington, c. 1910–1915

Washington left Santo Domingo on 20 November; but, later that month, continued high feelings over the closely contested election resulted in further unrest—unrest met by the dispatch of additional Marines to Santo Domingo. For Washington, however, her part in the Dominican intervention of 1914 was over. She sailed for home and arrived at Philadelphia on 24 November and became flagship of the Cruiser Squadron. She arrived for overhaul at the Portsmouth Navy Yard on 12 December 1914.

=== 1915 ===
Upon completion of her overhaul on 11 January 1915, Washington sailed via President Roads, Boston (where she took on ammunition on 11 January), for Hampton Roads, arriving there on 14 January. After a five-day visit, during which she took on stores and provisions and an expeditionary force of Marines, Washington sailed for the Caribbean once more.

Two revolutions had rocked Haiti in 1914; a third, in January 1915, led by General Vilbrun Guillaume Sam, had resulted only in further unrest for that troubled nation. Washington arrived at Cap-Haïtien on 23 January, a week after General Sam's troops had invested it. The armored cruiser, flying the flag of Rear Admiral William B. Caperton and commanded by Captain Edward L. Beach Sr. (father of future naval officer Edward L. Beach Jr., who would win fame as a famous submariner and author) stayed in port there until the 26th investigating "political conditions" before she shifted to the Haitian capital, Port-au-Prince, on 27 January. There, she again observed local political conditions in the wake of General Sam's takeover of the government before sailing, via Guantánamo, for Mexican waters.

Washington conducted sub-caliber practices, observed political conditions, and conducted torpedo practices off the ports of Tampico, Tuxpan, Progreso, and Veracruz into the summer. Receiving provisions and stores from the supply ship Celtic off Progreso on 26–27 June, the armored cruiser sailed for Guantánamo where she coaled and took on water on 30 June. She sailed the same day for Cap-Haïtien, as all reports from the American minister there indicated that yet another crisis was brewing.

While Washington awaited further developments at Cap-Haïtien, events in Port-au-Prince deteriorated, moving American chargé d'affaires Davis to send a telegram on 27 July to the Secretary of State, Robert Lansing, reporting the troubled conditions. He reported that President Sam and some of his men had been surrounded in the presidential palace and that the presence of American war vessels was desirable.

In accordance with that message, the Navy dispatched Washington to that port. Meanwhile, Sam took refuge in the French legation where he hoped that diplomatic immunity would prevail. The mobs of angry Haitians, however, were not concerned with such international niceties; they invaded the legation at 10:30 on 28 July 1915, forcibly removed former President Sam, killed and dismembered him, and paraded portions of his body on poles around the city.

Washington arrived at Port-au-Prince that day. Upon reviewing the situation, Admiral Caperton acted quickly. He ordered marines and a landing force ashore from his flagship to protect not only American interests but those of other foreign nations as well. Washington remained at Port-au-Prince into the winter. During that time, the United States effectively ran Haiti. On 12 August, Philippe Sudré Dartiguenave was elected president; and his government was recognized by the United States on 17 September.

=== 1916 ===
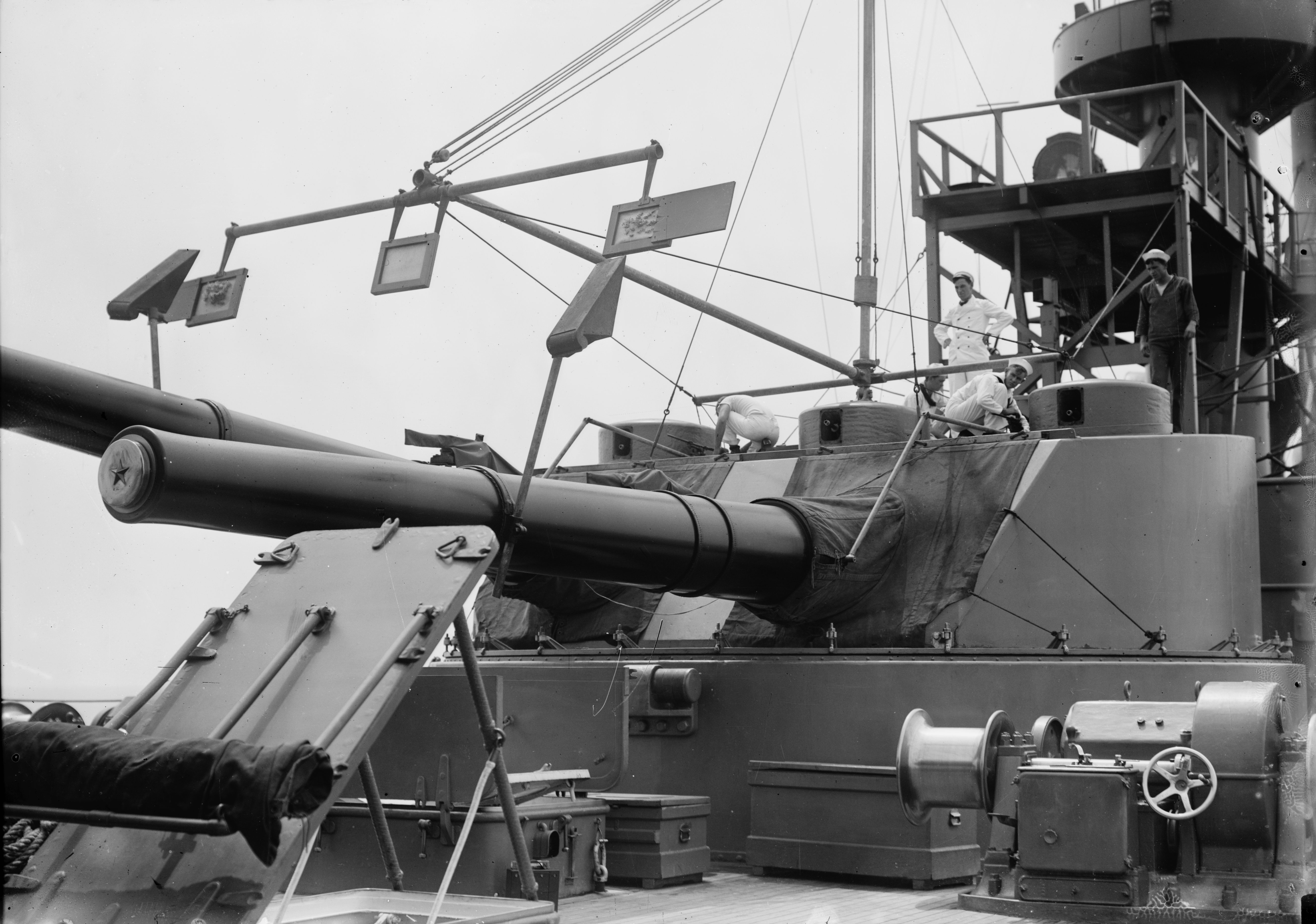
10-inch (250 mm) turret during gun practice

Ending that lengthy in-port period, Washington departed Port-au-Prince on 31 January 1916 and arrived at Guantánamo the following day. There, she transferred passengers and stores to other ships of the Fleet and later transferred a company of Marines to Norfolk soon after her arrival in Hampton Roads on 5 February. The armored cruiser steamed north, via New York and Boston; reached Portsmouth, New Hampshire on 29 February; and began an overhaul in the navy yard there which lasted until the end of March. Then, on 31 March, she was placed in reserve.

The ship was renamed Seattle on 9 November 1916—in order that her original name might be used for the new Colorado-class battleship USS Washington (BB-47)—but retained her classification as Armored Cruiser No. 11. She was simultaneously taken out of reserve and recommissioned for duty as flagship of the Destroyer Force.

== World War I ==
Seattle's peacetime duties as flagship for the Destroyer Force were short. On 6 April 1917, the United States, after attempting to remain neutral despite repeated incidents on the high seas, finally entered World War I.

Seattle arrived at New York on 3 June to be fitted out at the New York Navy Yard for war service. She sailed on 14 June as an escort for the first American convoy to European waters and as flagship for Rear Admiral Albert Gleaves. At 22:15 on 22 June, she encountered her first enemy submarines at 48°00′N 25°50′W.

Shortly before the convoy was attacked, Seattle's helm jammed; and she sheered out of formation sharply, sounding her whistle to warn the other vessels. A few minutes later, the ship was brought back on course. Soon lookouts noted a white streak in the water 50 yd (46 m) ahead of the vessel, crossing from starboard to port at right angles to Seattle's course. Admiral Gleaves, asleep in the charthouse at the time, awoke and was on the bridge in time to see the armored cruiser's gun crews manning their weapons and the transport De Kalb opening fire on the U-boat.

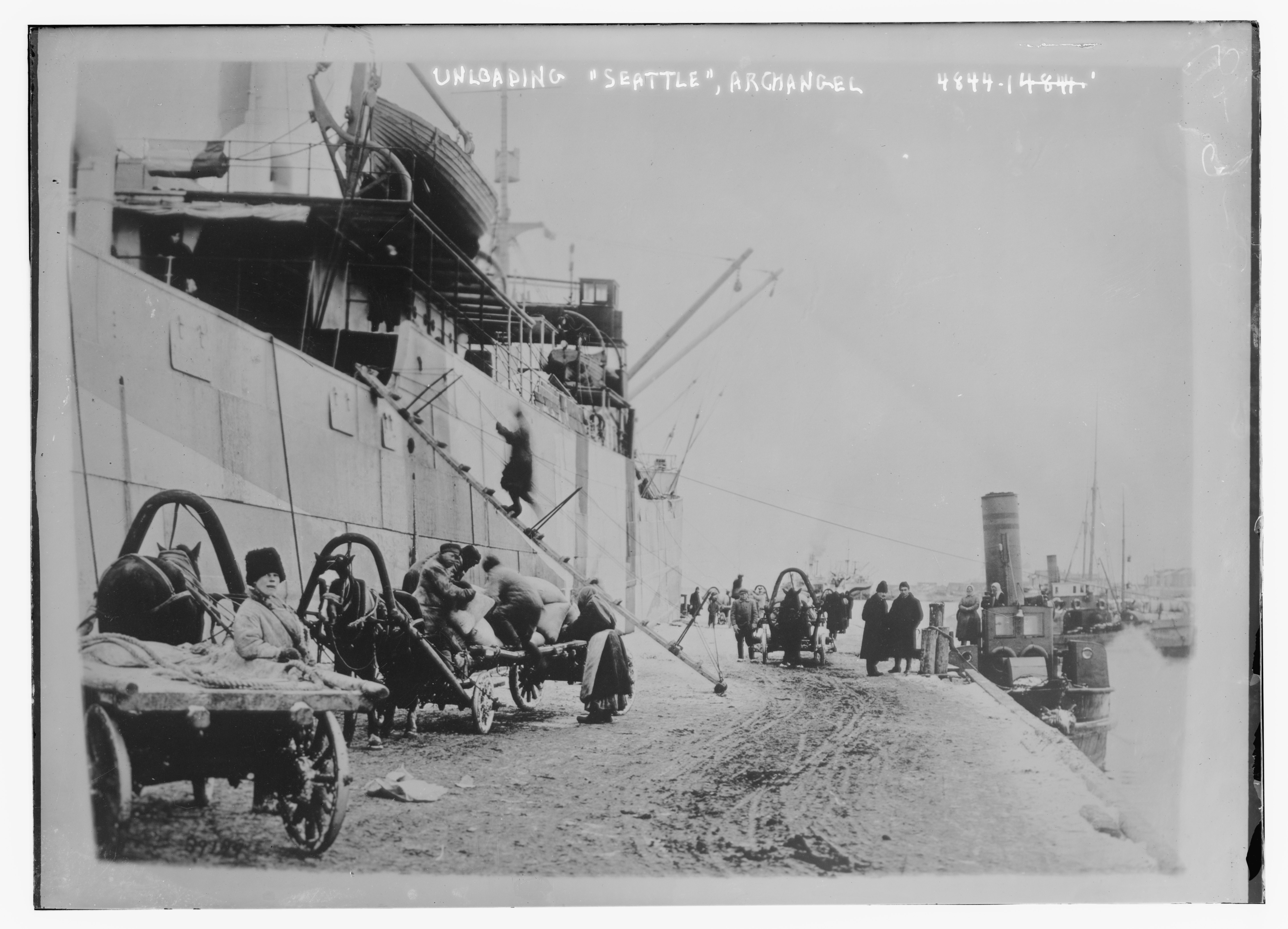
Seattle unloading in Arkhangelsk, Russia, on 27 October 1918

Subsequently, the destroyer Wilkes attacked an enemy submersible but failed to sink the German submarine. Later information indicated that the enemy, probably aware of the approach of the first American expeditionary forces, had dispatched a pair of submarines to lie in wait for it. The attack, conducted under "ideal" conditions, was, fortunately for the Americans, unsuccessful. Admiral Gleaves, in his report to the Commander in Chief, Atlantic Fleet, on 12 July, reported unequivocally: "their [the enemy's] failure to score hits was probably due to the attack being precipitated by the fortuitous circumstances of the Seattle's helm jamming and the sounding of her whistle, leading the enemy to suppose he had been discovered."

Seattle operated on comparatively uneventful escort duties for the remainder of World War I, completing her ninth round-trip voyage at New York on 27 October 1918.

== Inter-war period ==
After the armistice of 11 November 1918, Seattle—like many other ships—was fitted with extra accommodations to enable her to function as a transport, and she brought back doughboys from France until 5 July 1919. Later, after all of her special troop fittings had been removed, Seattle sailed for the west coast to join the Pacific Fleet.

Reviewed by President Woodrow Wilson on 12 September at her namesake city—Seattle—the armored cruiser shifted to the Puget Sound Navy Yard where she was placed in "reduced commission". While in that inactive status, Seattle was reclassified—CA-11—on 17 July 1920.

Placed in full commission again on 1 March 1923, Captain George L. P. Stone in command, Seattle became the flagship for the Commander in Chief, United States Fleet. In that role, over the next four years, she wore the four-starred flags of a succession of officers: Admirals Hilary P. Jones, Robert Coontz, Samuel S. Robison (who was embarked in the ship at the time of the Australian cruise of 1925), and Charles F. Hughes. During that time, the armored cruiser operated from Seattle to Hawaii and from Panama to Australia.

Subsequently, returning to the Atlantic in June 1927, Seattle passed in review before President Calvin Coolidge on 3 June. After a cruise along the east coast, the ship arrived at New York on 29 August to assume duties as the receiving ship at that port. On 1 July 1931, the ship's classification was changed to "unclassified."

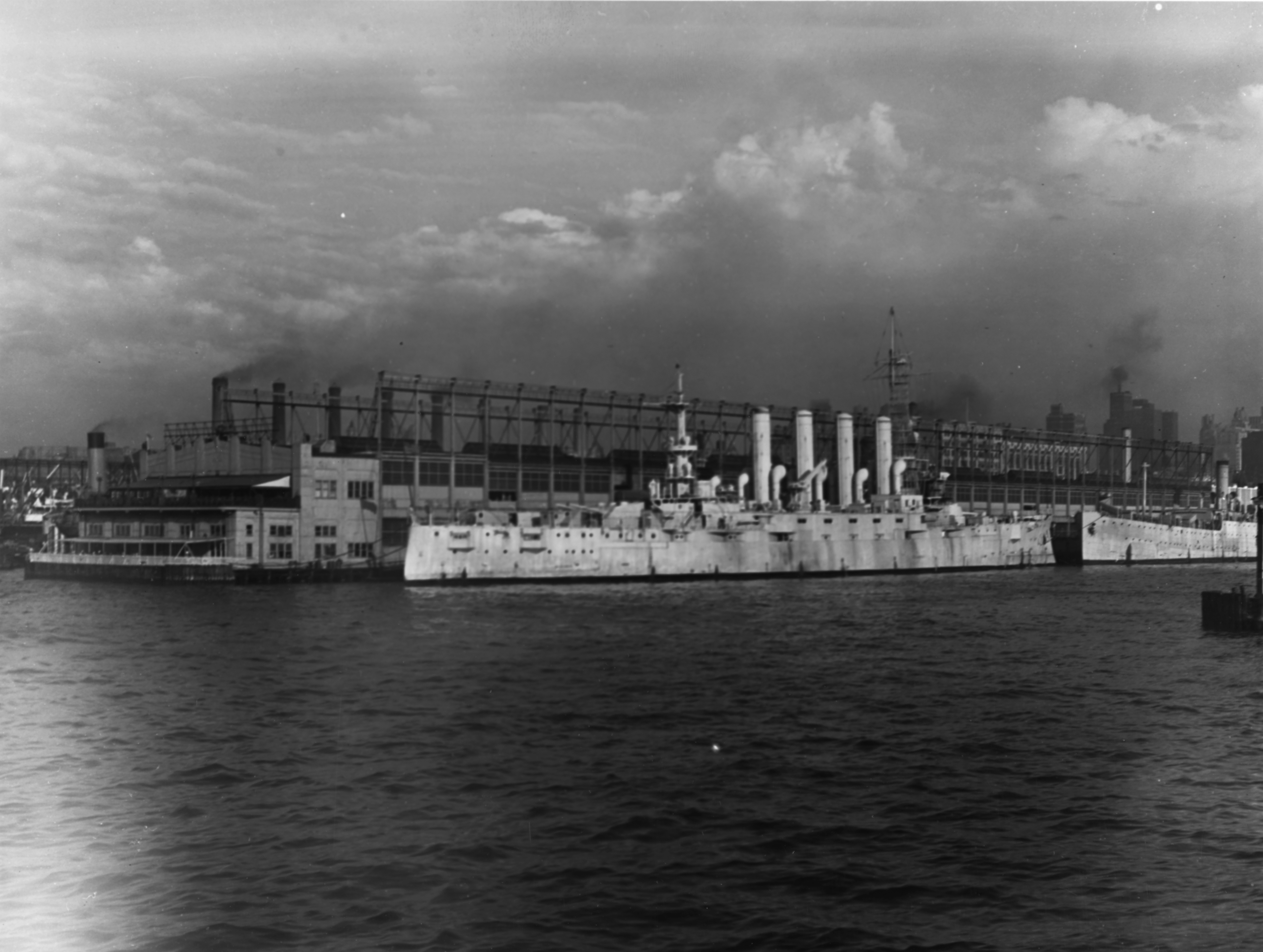
USS Seattle docked at Pier 92 in New York City during World War II

As receiving ship, Seattle served as a floating barracks—a "clearance house for personnel"—at New York into the 1940s. Ships and stations transferred men to her for attending various schools in the 3rd Naval District; she provided men for tugs and other district craft, as well as naval escorts for patriotic functions (parades and funerals, etc.) and, on board her, crews for ships preparing to go into commission were assembled. Among those ships was the light cruiser Honolulu.

== World War II ==
On 17 February 1941, the erstwhile armored cruiser was again reclassified, this time as IX-39 and served as receiving ship for the duration of World War II. She was ultimately placed out of commission at New York on 28 June 1946 and was struck from the Navy List on 19 July of the same year. Sold on 3 December to Hugo Neu of New York City, the former flagship of the United States Fleet and receiving ship at New York was subsequently scrapped.

== Awards ==
- Mexican Service Medal
- Haitian Campaign Medal
- World War I Victory Medal with "ESCORT" clasp
- American Defense Service Medal
- American Campaign Medal
- World War II Victory Medal

== Bibliography ==
- Alden, John D. American Steel Navy: A Photographic History of the U.S. Navy from the Introduction of the Steel Hull in 1883 to the Cruise of the Great White Fleet. Annapolis, Maryland: Naval Institute Press, 1989. ISBN 0-87021-248-6
- Friedman, Norman. U.S. Cruisers: An Illustrated Design History. Annapolis, Maryland: Naval Institute Press, 1984. ISBN 0-87021-718-6
- Musicant, Ivan. U.S. Armored Cruisers: A Design and Operational History. Annapolis, Maryland: Naval Institute Press, 1985. ISBN 0-87021-714-3
- Taylor, Michael J.H. (1990). Jane's Fighting Ships of World War I. Studio. ISBN 1-85170-378-0.
- Sieche, Erwin F. (1990). "Austria-Hungary's Last Visit to the USA". Warship International. XXVII (2): 142–164. ISSN 0043-0374.
