= Tennessee-class cruiser =

Class of American naval ships

Tennessee class
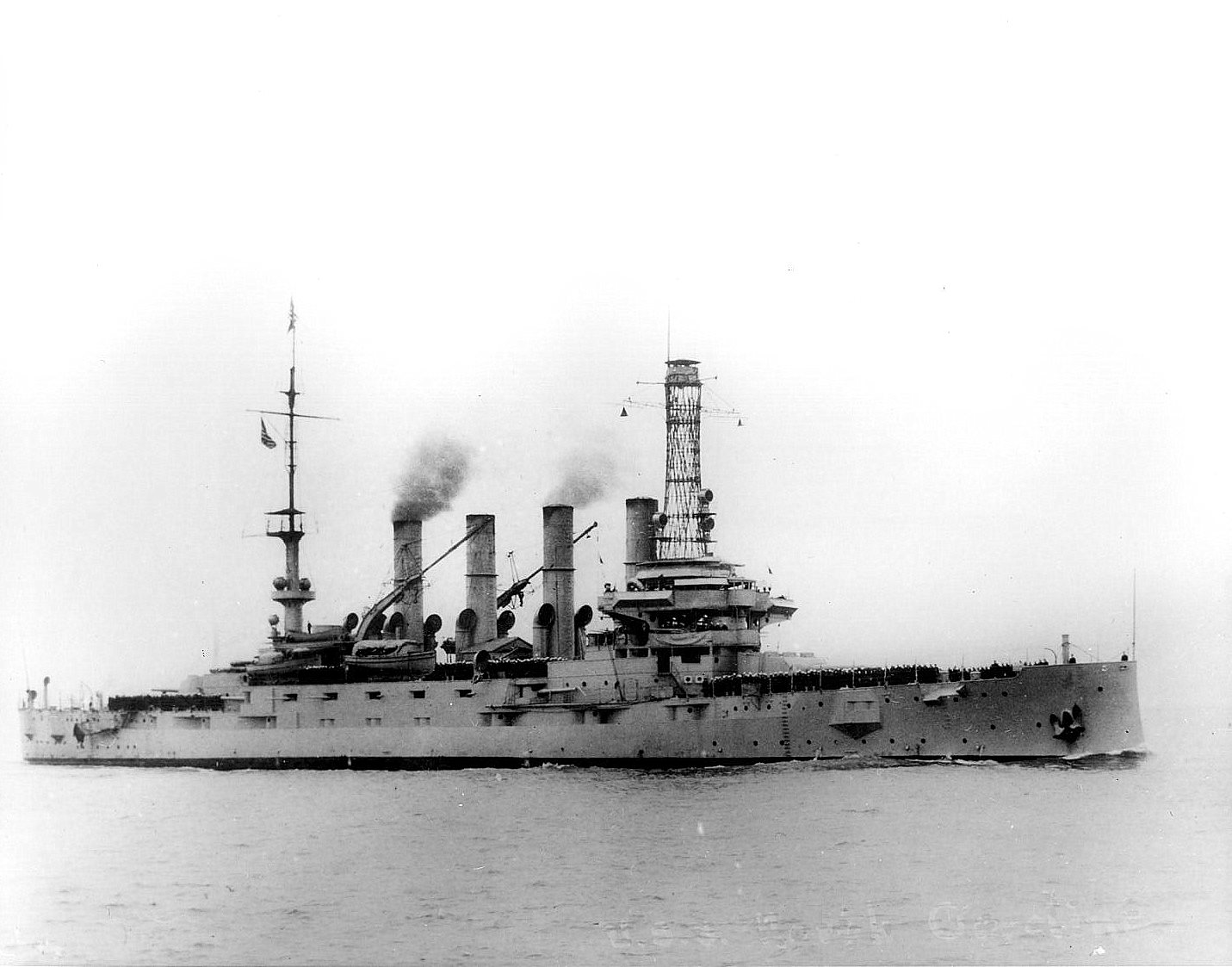
- USS North Carolina

Class overview
- Builders: Newport News Shipbuilding; New York Shipbuilding; William Cramp & Sons
- Operators: United States Navy
- Preceded by: Pennsylvania class
- Succeeded by: None
- Built: 1903–1906
- In commission: 1906–1946
- Completed: 4
- Lost: 1
- Scrapped: 3

General characteristics
- Type: Armored cruiser
- Displacement: 14,500 long tons (14,733 t) tons standard; 15,712 long tons (15,964 t) tons full load
- Length: 504 ft 6 in (153.8 m)
- Beam: 72 ft 10 in (22.2 m)
- Draft: 25 ft (7.6 m)
- Installed power: 23,000 ihp (17,150 kW)
- Propulsion: 16 × Babcock & Wilcox boilers; 2 × vertical triple expansion engines; 2 shafts
- Speed: 22 knots (41 km/h; 25 mph)
- Complement: 887 officers and enlisted
- Armament: 4 × 10 in (254 mm)/40 Mark 3 guns in twin turrets; 16 × 6 in (152 mm)/50 Mk.8 guns in single casemates; 22 × 3 in (76 mm)/50 guns in single mountings; 12 × 3-pounder guns; 4 × 21 inch (533 mm) torpedo tubes
- Armor: Waterline belt: 3–5 in (76–127 mm); Deck: 1.5–4 in (38–102 mm); Conning tower: 9 in (229 mm); Gun turrets: 2.5–9 in (64–229 mm)

The Tennessee-class cruisers were four armored cruisers built for the United States Navy between 1903 and 1906. Their main armament of four 10-inch (254 mm) guns in twin turrets was the heaviest carried by any American armored cruiser. Their armor was thinner than that of the six Pennsylvanias which immediately preceded them, a controversial but inevitable decision due to newly imposed congressional restraints on tonnage for armored cruisers and the need for them to be able to steam at 22 knots (41 km/h; 25 mph). However, the fact their armor covered a wider area of the ship than in the Pennsylvanias and their increased firepower caused them to be seen by the Navy as an improvement.

The Tennessees were the largest and last American armored cruisers built, a response to foreign developments and the changing notion of the armored cruiser from fast scout, convoy escort and commerce raider to auxiliary capital ship in a battle line, despite its thin armor protection compared to that of battleships. The Battle of Tsushima in 1905 was seen to validate this concept. While they were being built, questions remained in U.S. naval circles over whether they possessed enough speed, armament or armor to perform their intended duties adequately. They were generally considered armed and protected strongly enough to combat an enemy armored cruiser successfully. Even so, it was generally conceded that with this class a limit had been reached and that the modern armored cruiser no longer exemplified the logical principles of attack and defense in warship design, which meant using the most efficient weapon to its desired end. The appearance of the British Invincible-class battlecruisers, with their greater speed and firepower, ensured their obsolescence as fighting units.

All four ships in this class were given the hull classification symbol CA (armored cruiser) when the Navy adopted that system in 1920, and renamed by then so their original names could be used for new battleships. USS Tennessee, renamed Memphis, was wrecked by a tsunami while at anchor in Santo Domingo harbor in 1916. The other three ships served in World War I. The Navy considered modernization in 1922 and 1928 to upgrade their speed and fighting capability but this did not materialize. USS North Carolina, renamed Charlotte, and USS Montana, renamed Missoula, were scrapped under the terms of the London Naval Treaty, which set an aggregate tonnage limit for the Navy's cruisers, and the new heavy cruisers of the Pensacola class and subsequent classes were entering service. USS Washington, renamed Seattle, was reclassified in 1931 and served as a receiving ship and floating barracks until scrapped in 1946.

== Background ==
=== Cruiser race; Japanese rumblings ===
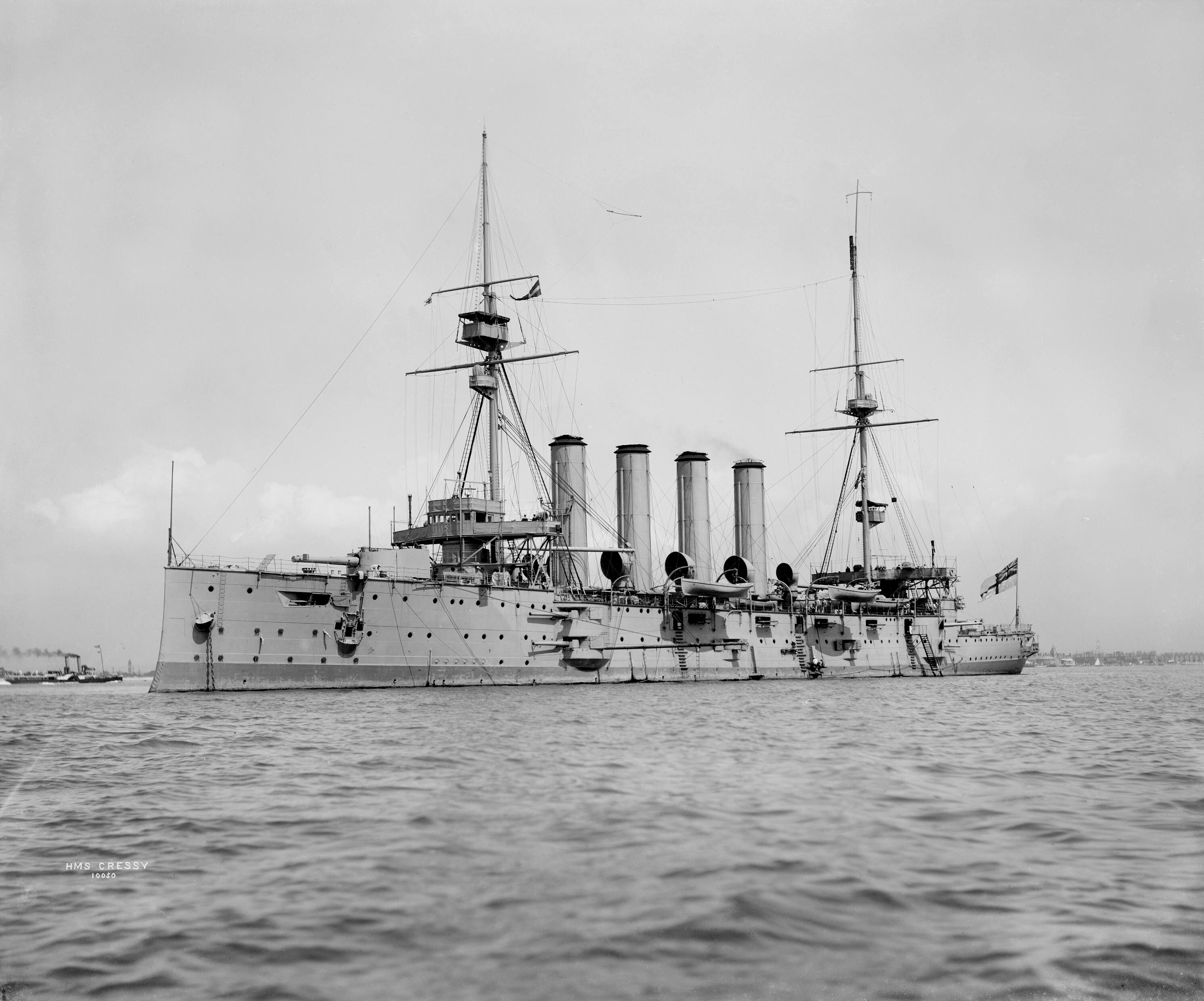
HMS Cressy

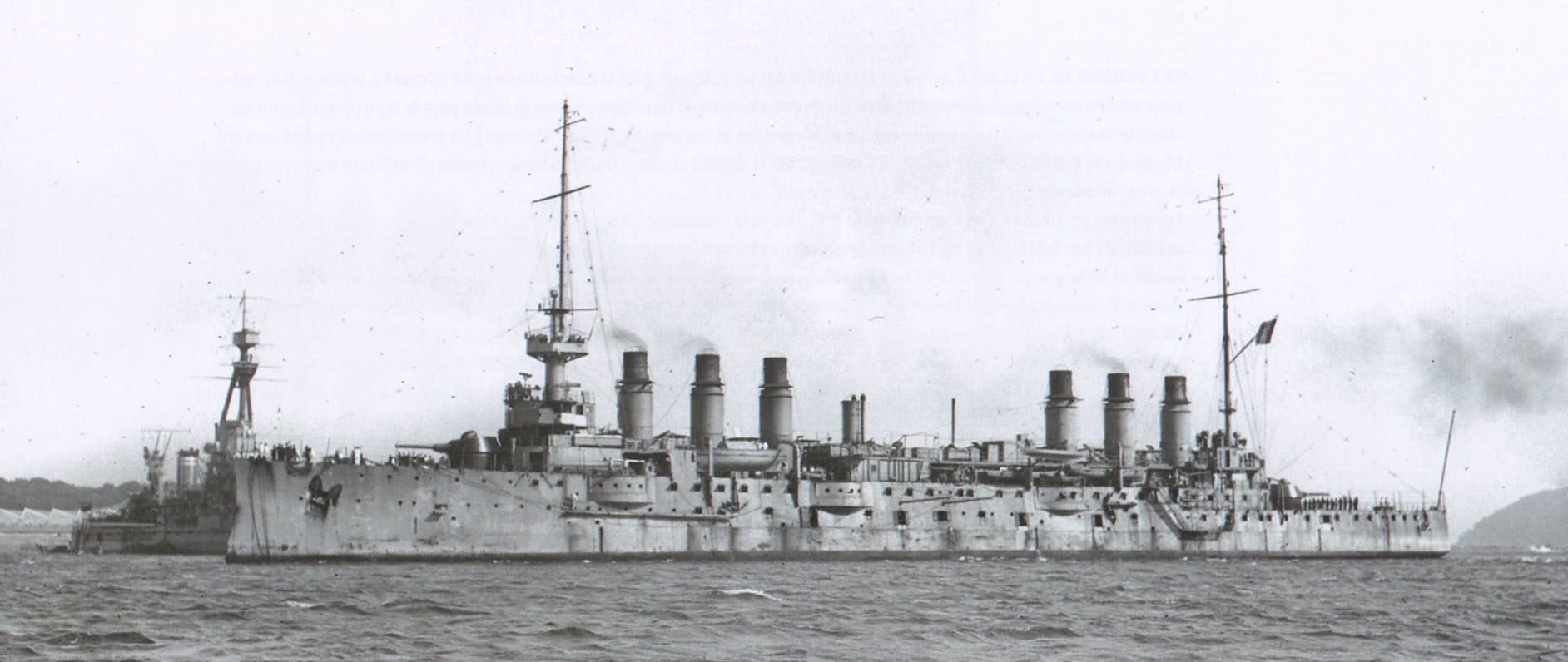
French cruiser Jeanne d'Arc

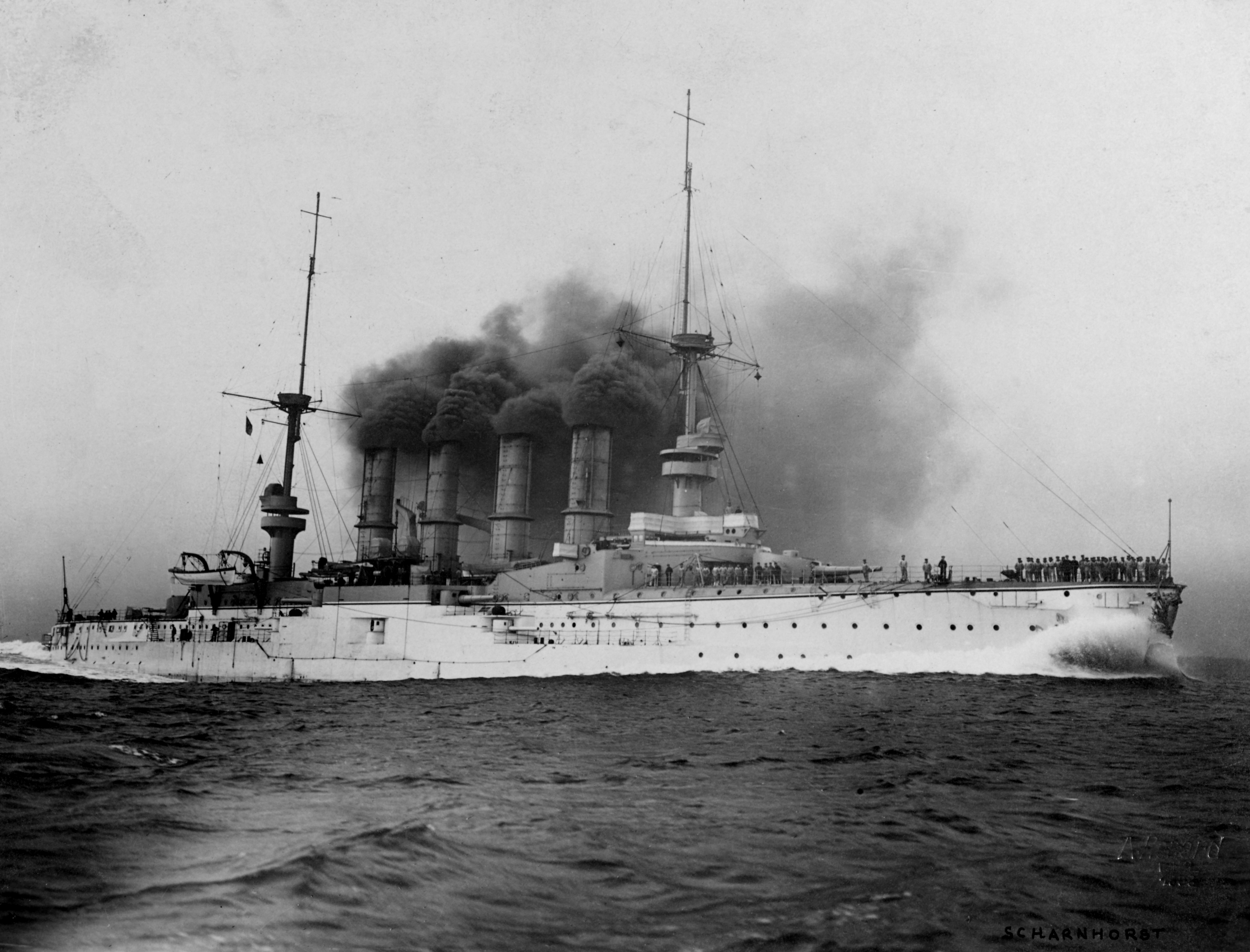
SMS Scharnhorst

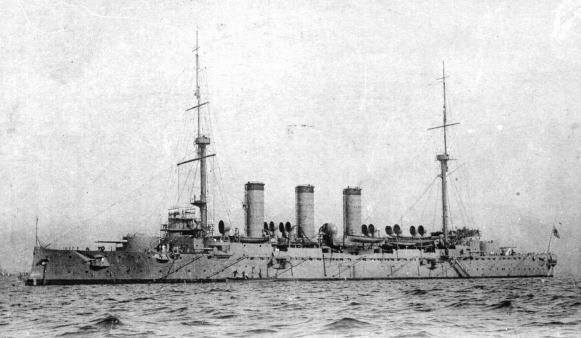
IJN Yakumo

A race to build armored cruisers to protect maritime trade, attack commerce and maintain a presence at foreign stations had been taking place since the 1890s, with ships built with larger guns and an arrangement of guns and armor similar, at least in overall design if not in degree, to that of battleships. The Royal Navy had pursued an extended period of armored cruiser construction as part of the arms race between it and the Imperial German Navy and to have enough ships to safeguard the vast British Empire. Beginning with the Cressy class in 1898, it had laid down or was planning seven classes of armored cruisers, a total of 35 ships. The last of these, the Minotaur class, would displace 14,600 tons, be capable of 23 knots (43 km/h; 26 mph) and be armed with four 9.2-inch (234 mm) and 10 7.5-inch (191 mm) guns. This would give Great Britain the largest armored cruiser force in the world. France was building a series of increasingly large armored cruisers for scouting and commercial warfare, beginning with the 11,000-ton Jeanne d'Arc in 1896, protected with a 6-inch (152 mm) belt and armed with 7.6-inch (193 mm) and 5.5-inch (140 mm) guns, and culminating with the 14,000-ton Edgar Quinet class, slightly faster at 23 knots, armed with 14 7.74-inch (197 mm) guns and armored with up to 6.7 inches (170 mm) on their belts, almost 4 inches (100 mm) on their decks and 6 inches (150 mm) on their turrets. Germany, as part of its Second Naval Law, began a series of 14 armored cruisers envisioned for use on overseas stations. Between 1897 and 1906 they would lay down eight, the initial two armed with 9.44-inch (240 mm) guns, the other six with more modern 8.2-inch (208 mm). The final pair, Scharnhorst and Gneisenau, would displace 12,781 tons, steam at 23.5 knots, carry 6 inches (152 mm) of belt and 2 inches (51 mm) of deck armor and carry eight 8.2 inch guns.

Then there was Japan. Its naval build-up following the end of the First Sino-Japanese War in 1895 and its forced return of the Liaotung peninsula to China under pressure from Russia, Germany and France (in what became known as the "Triple Intervention") had at its core a "Six-Six Program" of six battleships and six (eventually eight) armored cruisers comparable to the British Cressy class. The Yakumo followed the basic pattern for these cruisers—on a 9,646 long tons (9,801 t) displacement, she carried four 7.99-inch (203 mm) and twelve 6-inch (150 mm) guns, was protected by a 3.5–6.7-inch (89–170 mm) main belt, 2.4-inch (61 mm) armored deck and 5.9-inch (150 mm) turret armor and steamed at 20.5 knots (23.6 mph; 38.0 km/h). United States President Theodore Roosevelt, while impressed with Japan's success in the war and its modernization overall, considered its actions a threat to American interests in the Pacific region. This in turn had motivated him to maintain a "controlling voice" in the Philippines after the Philippine–American War ended in 1902 and would encourage him to send the Great White Fleet on its worldwide voyage in 1907. (Unfortunately, the visit of the fleet would inspire Japan to step up its building program still further.) (Note: The Russian Baltic Fleet's poor mechanical condition and inability to refuel while sailing halfway around the world to fight the Japanese, only to be defeated at the Battle of Tsushima, was a huge motivation in sending the Great White Fleet. Roosevelt felt, in light of that victory and Great Britain's withdrawal of many of its naval units to its home waters, that the Navy's ability to perform a similar scenario in the Pacific and maintain battle-readiness needed reassessment, should the likelihood arise.) Japan's 1905 victory in the Russo-Japanese War would usher its entrance as a world power and begin a rivalry with the United States over dominance in the Pacific. As Roosevelt would surmise during that conflict in a letter to British diplomat Cecil Spring Rice, "The Japs interest me and I like them. I am perfectly well aware that if they win out it may possibly mean a struggle between them and us in the future."

To keep up with these developments and better protect the large sea areas the U.S. had recently won in the Spanish–American War, the U.S. Navy had built six 13,680-ton Pennsylvania-class cruisers. Armed with four 8-inch (203 mm) and 14 6-inch (152 mm) guns, covered with 6 inches (152 mm) of belt armor and with a top speed of 22 knots, they were considerably bigger than USS New York and USS Brooklyn which preceded them and improved in overall protection. However, the Navy considered the armored area of these ships restricted and the caliber of their heavy guns small compared to their displacement. This did not stop the Navy's Bureau of Construction and Repair (C&R) from requesting funds from Congress for two additional units as part of the 1901 naval building program. When Congress did not approve funding for these ships, this obligated the Secretary of the Navy under law to order a new study of capital ship and armored cruiser designs that Congress might approve. A smaller, 11,000-ton design with thinner armor than the Pennsylvanias was favored by the Board's new Chief Constructor, F. T. Bowles, who considered the Pennsylvanias "indefensible on account of their size." However, reducing the size of any new warships was considered unacceptable politically, as Congress had already opposed the growth in size and cost of vessels recently commissioned. Also, Rear Admiral R.B. Bradford of the Bureau of Equipment and Recruiting, who had supported the building of the Pennsylvanias, wanted to keep the new ships as homogeneous in size as possible to the earlier ones and at least comparable to them in fighting strength.

=== Development ===
Several design issues on the new cruisers had to be worked out by C&R before a proposed design could be finalized. Bowles was concerned over what he considered inadequate protection in the Pennsylvanias, especially the thin deck armor near the main magazines. British designs placed these magazines well below the ship's waterline and far back from her sides but tended to be much smaller than in US designs. Since US cruisers generally carried heavier armament than their British counterparts, this necessitated magazines with greater volume to ensure adequate ammunition. In his 14,500-ton proposed design labeled "F," Bowles extended the casemate armor to include the turrets and increased the ship's beam slightly to compensate for the added weight. He also wanted to make the side armor one inch thinner than in the Pennsylvanias and concentrate the 6-inch guns at the ends of the ships to increase the areas covered by their protection.

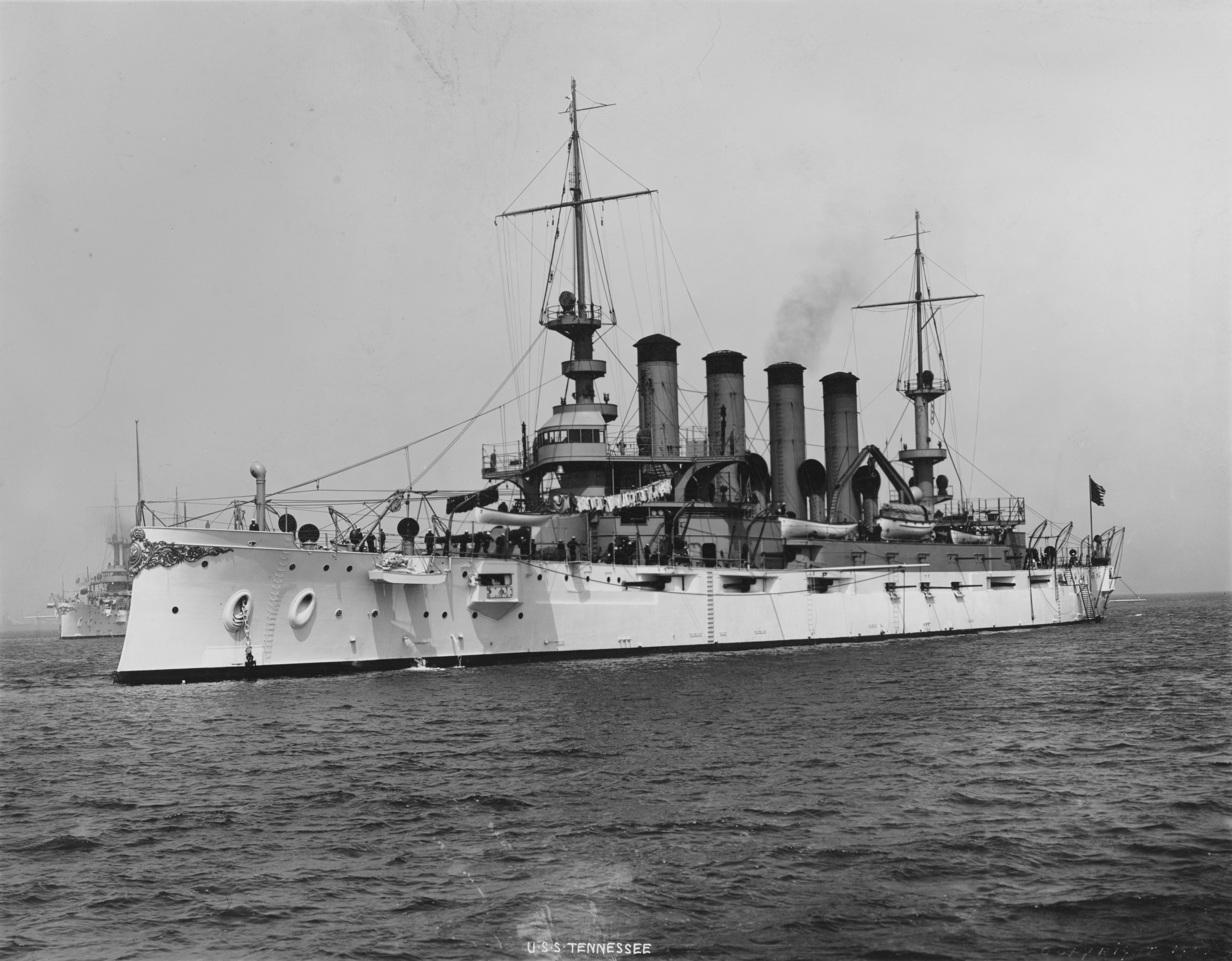
USS Tennessee ca. 1907

There was also the question of whether any new armament should be included in the proposed cruiser. New weapons under consideration included a 10-inch (254 mm) heavy gun and a 7-inch (178 mm) secondary gun. The 7-inch gun was especially scrutinized since its shell was the heaviest that could be handled manually. Proposed design "G" included both these weapons; however, Bradford suspected that, due to the issue of weight, the 8-inch cannons used in the Pennsylvanias might be more practical as main armament. The weight of four 10-inch and 16 7-inch guns was such that the armor over the casemates would have to be reduced to 1.5 inches (38 mm) for flat surfaces and by 1 inch (25 mm) for the outside slopes. Proposed design "H," armed with four 10-inch and 16 6-inch (152 mm) guns, offered better protection, with 5 inches (127 mm) of casemate armor extended from top to bottom between the two turrets to protect ammunition for the 3-inch (76 mm) anti-torpedo boat guns. This was the design submitted to the Secretary of the Navy on 31 July 1901 with a request to include two additional 3-inch guns and greater isolation of the 6-inch battery.

Meanwhile, Congress had become concerned about the growing size of new Navy ships of all ratings and set a firm limit of 14,500 tons, the same as the Pennsylvanias, for armored cruiser project to be considered for the 1902 naval building program. This limit paralleled one that Congress had previously set for battleships. The estimated weight for proposed design "H" was 14,700 tons. Also, Engineer in Chief George Wallace Melville had requested engines for these ships with 2000 more indicated horsepower than the Pennsylvanias to compensate for 1500 tons of accumulated weight during the design process. The added horsepower would ensure a top speed of 22 knots, the same as the Pennsylvania class. The tonnage limitation may have been expected since means to save weight on the new design were already being sought in the fall of 1901. At that time, Melville was asked about reducing boiler weight, to which he refused, claiming it was impossible for him to install reliable machinery of 25,000 horsepower for the same amount of weight as he had been allocated for 23,000 horsepower in the Pennsylvanias.

The issue of reducing engineering weight reemerged when Bowles asked for 200 extra tons to increase deck armor. Even with the decrease, he argued, the ships would still be able to make 22 knots. Bradford sided with Bowles but Melville claimed he could save only 50 tons; the other 140 tons could be saved by reducing the amount of coal the ships carried on trials from 900 to 750 tons. This, Bowles replied, would make the new cruisers a "fake design." Nor was it entirely clear whether they really needed 25,000 horsepower to attain their designed speed. Model testing, then new, was apparently something in which Melville did not believe and none of the Pennsylvanias had yet run trials. Melville cited British cruisers of the same size as the new design, which used 30,000 horsepower to steam at 24 knots. After heated discussion the board agreed on 23,000 indicated horsepower and a design speed of 22 knots.

The first pair of these cruisers, Tennessee and Washington, were approved by Congress under the 1902 Naval Building Program. The other pair, North Carolina and Montana, were approved in 1904.

== Design ==
In the Navy's view, the evolution of the armored cruiser from the New York and Brooklyn to the Tennessee class was a progression toward "what was in reality a battle-cruiser." As such, it claimed, the Tennessees "excelled in battery power and protection any armored cruiser built, building, or designed, in the world at that time." The issue of speed did not go away and the Tennessees were criticized within the Bureau of Construction and Repair for being slower than their British and French counterparts. Engineer in Chief Melville stated in his minority report, "I cannot believe that Congress did not intend that these vessels should be equal to or superior to any of their class, that class being armored cruisers, and not battleships where very high speed may not be so essential; and I am not at all certain that an additional knot and the power for it should not have been insisted upon in the first place."

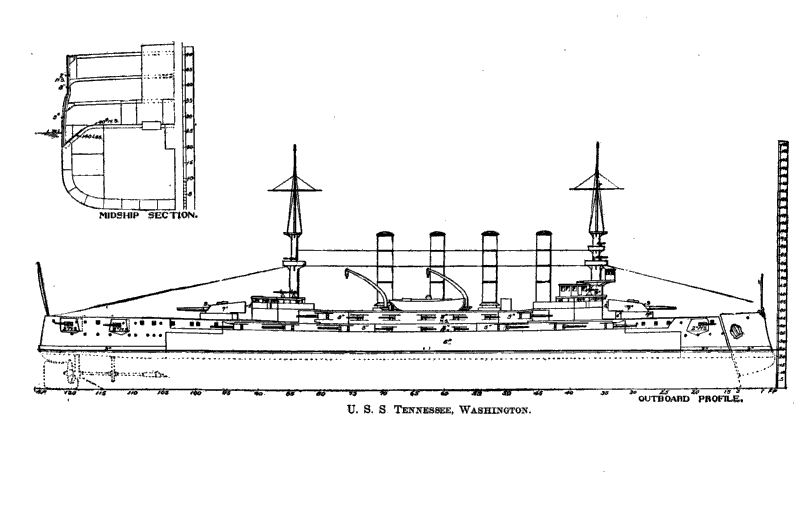
Side and mid-ship section view of Tennessee-class armored cruiser

=== General characteristics ===
The Tennessee- and Pennsylvania-class cruisers were nearly identical in overall size. They shared a length of 504 ft 6 in (153.77 m), and draft of 25 ft (7.6 m). With a beam of 72 feet 10 inches (22.20 m), the Tennessees were only 3 ft 1 in (0.94 m) wider and displaced just over 800 tons more for a total of 14,500 long tons (14,733 t) standard, 15,712 long tons (15,964 tonnes) full load. While their hull designs were essentially the same, the Tennessees benefited from improved underwater lines; this plus a beamy waterline plane made these ships extremely steady at maintaining speed and allowed them, even with their increased weight, to steam at 22 knots with no increase in horsepower specifications over the Pennsylvanias. They tended to pitch rather than roll in heavy seas but were basically considered good sea boats. Freeboard at the line of the main deck was 18 feet (5.5 m) amidships, 24 feet (7.3 m) forward and 21.5 feet (6.6 m) aft. The conning tower, located on the lower bridge, was one deck higher than in the Pennsylvania class.

=== Propulsion ===
Although Melville had argued for triple screws (for which he had advocated since the 1890s), the twin-screw arrangement of the Pennsylvanias was retained. Two four-cylinder vertical triple expansion engines, located in separate watertight compartments, supplied a combined total of 23,000 indicated horsepower at 120 revolutions per minute. Diameters of high- and low-pressure cylinders were in the ratio of i to 7.3: High Pressure 38.5 inches (980 mm); Intermediate Pressure 63.5 inches (1,610 mm); Low Pressure, 2 of 74 inches (1,880 mm). Piston stroke for all cylinders was 48 inches (1.2 m). Sixteen Babcock & Wilcox straight water-tube boilers, sub-divided into eight watertight compartments, supplied steam at a pressure of 265 psi (1,830 kPa) at boiler, 250 psi (1,700 kPa) at engine. These had a combined grate surface of 1650 square feet and a heating surface of 70,940 square feet. Forced draft was on the closed fire-room system. The ships usually carried 900 tons of coal but could hold a maximum of approximately 2,000 tons, which gave them a range of approximately 6,500 nautical miles at a cruising speed of 10 knots and approximately 3100 nautical miles at full speed.

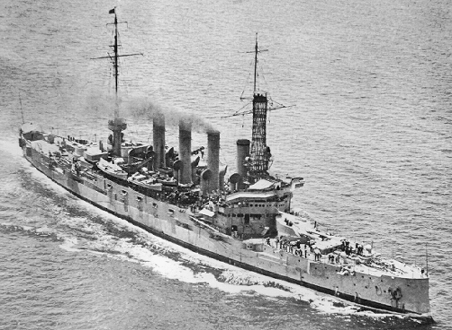
USS Washington

Design speed was 22 knots (25 mph; 41 km/h). Despite Melville's concern about insufficient power, all four ships performed higher than expected during trials in both horsepower and speed. Each ship went through its speed trials in two stages, a four-hour run at flank speed and a 24-hour endurance run at the maximum maintainable speed.

Name	Four-hour IHP	Four-hour speed	24-hour IHP	24-hour speed
Tennessee	25,892	22.16 knots (41.04 km/h)	21,600	21.28 knots (39.41 km/h)
Washington	26,862	22.27 knots (41.24 km/h)	---	---
North Carolina	26,038	22.48 knots (41.63 km/h)	19,802	20.6 knots (38.2 km/h)
Montana	27,489	22.26 knots (41.23 km/h)	19,102	20.48 knots (37.93 km/h)

=== Armament ===
Barring USS Maine's original designation as an armored cruiser, the Tennessees carried the heaviest-caliber ordnance of any American cruiser until the Alaska class appeared during World War II. Their armament represented increases of 29.7 percent in ordnance and a 47.5 percent in broadside weight over the Pennsylvania class. With very few exceptions, they outgunned every foreign armored cruiser either afloat or then being built. In "The Seapower of the Nations" section of Army & Navy Illustrated, columnist John Leyland cites Admiral O'Neill's annual ordnance report to Congress that the aim of the US Navy "has always been ... to build vessels of all classes with great gun-power ... that they should be superior to foreign vessels of like classes in that respect." To illustrate this point, Leyland supplies a table comparing firepower and broadside weight of comparative foreign cruisers. Broadside weight includes main and secondary weapons.

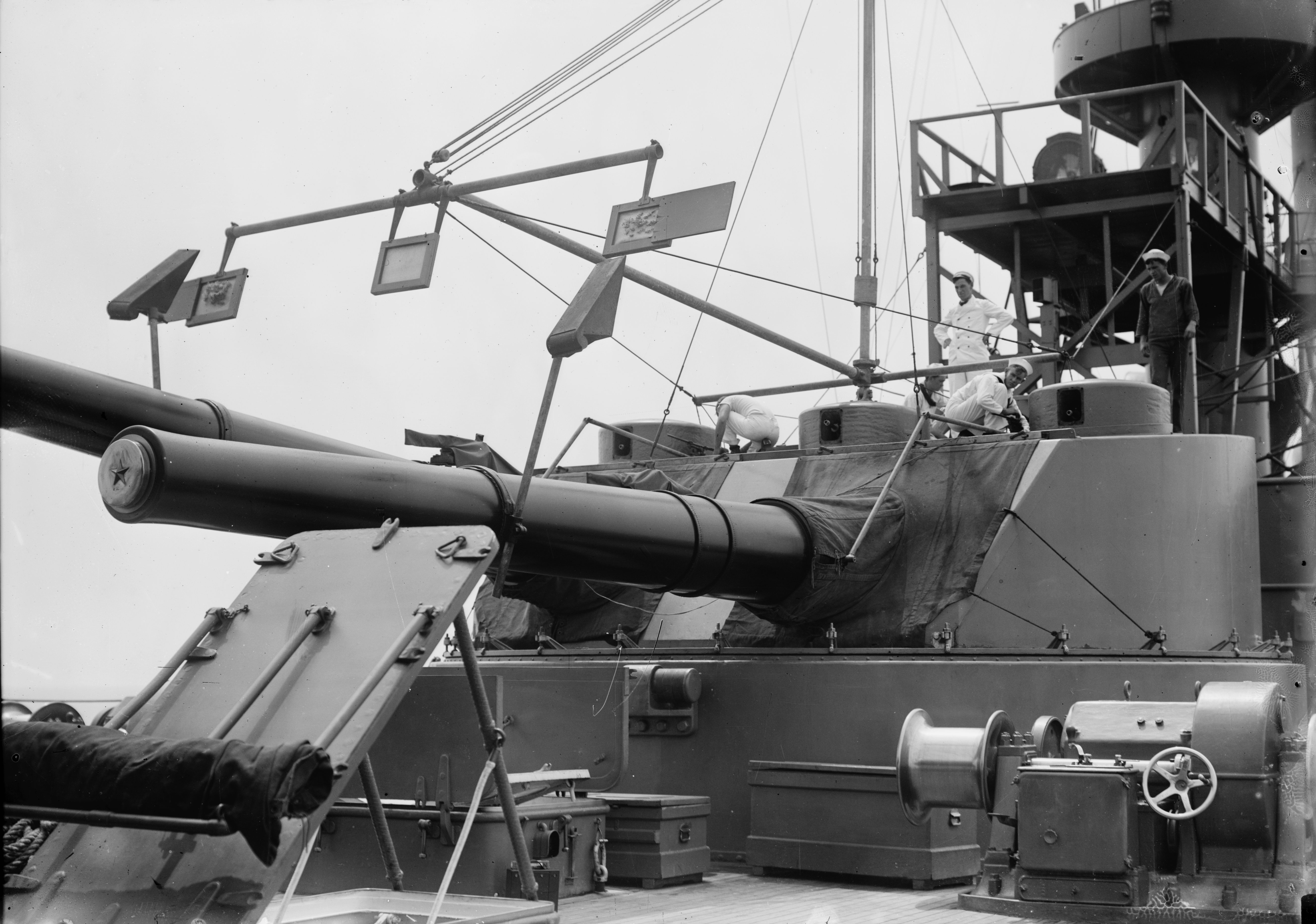
10-inch turret on USS Washington during gun practice

Name	Country	Displacement (tons)	Armament	Weight of discharge	Speed
Good Hope	Britain	14,100	2 × 9.2-inch (234 mm), 16 × 6-inch (152 mm)	2,560-pound (1,160 kg)	23 knots (43 km/h)
Tennessee	US	14,500	4 × 10-inch (254 mm), 16 × 6-inch (152 mm)	3,900 pounds (1,800 kg)	22 knots (41 km/h)
Jules Ferry	France	12,550	4 × 194-millimetre (7.6 in), 16 × 164-millimetre (6.5 in)	2,260 pounds (1,030 kg)	22 knots (41 km/h)
Fürst Bismarck	Germany	10,650	4 × 240-millimetre (9.4 in), 12 × 150-millimetre (5.9 in)	3,200 pounds (1,500 kg)	19 knots (35 km/h)
Tsukuba	Japan	13,750	4 × 12-inch (305 mm), 12 × 6-inch (152 mm), 12 × 4.7-inch (119 mm)	4,400 pounds (2,000 kg)	20.5 knots (38.0 km/h)

==== Main guns ====
The Tennessees' main armament consisted of four 10-inch (254 mm) 40-caliber Mark 3 guns, which had a maximum elevation of 14.5° and could depress to −3°. 60 rounds per gun were carried in peacetime, 72 rounds in wartime. They fired a 510-pound (231 kg) shell at a muzzle velocity of 2,700 feet per second (820 m/s) to a range of 20,000 yards (18,288 m) at maximum elevation at a rate of 2 - 3 rounds per minute. These guns were mounted in twin turrets fore and aft. (As a comparison, the British BL 9.2-inch (233.7 mm) gun fired a 380-pound (170 kg) shell at a velocity of 2,643 ft/s (806 m/s) (Note: 380 lb shell, with 103 lb cordite Mk I propellant size 44 (originally) (Text Book of Gunnery 1902), or 120 lb cordite MD size 37 (1914 onwards).) to a range of 29,200 yd (26,700 m).)

The Mark 3 was the last 10-inch gun built for the U.S. Navy, with a tube, jacket, locking ring and screw box liner manufactured from nickel steel. Due to the "smokeless" powders which came into use near the turn of the 20th century, these guns boasted a higher velocity than those used during the Spanish–American War. They also had a flatter trajectory, which led to more accurate firing and aided in centralized fire control. In 1908, the armor-piercing shells were fitted with a ballistic cap lengthened to 7crh. This improved their penetration ability at longer ranges.

The main guns benefited from their placement when compared to those of foreign armored cruisers. The British mounted the majority of 9.2-inch guns on its Duke of Edinburgh, Warrior and Minotaur-class cruisers athwart their forecastles on the main deck. This made the guns very wet and practically useless in less than moderate seas. The 10-inch guns of the Tennessees, on the other hand, were 30 feet (9.1 m) above the waterline. In comparing these ships, theoretician and chief constructor for the Royal Danish Navy, Commander William Hovgaard, considered the Tennessees' placement "beyond question, the best gun position in a ship. The arc of fire is more than twice that which can be obtained on the broadside, the field of view is entirely free, and a combination of longitudinal and broadside fire on both sides is obtained, which is alone possible in the end positions."

==== Secondary and light guns ====
The secondary armament comprised sixteen 6-inch (152 mm) 50-cal Mark 8 guns. 200 rounds per gun were carried. They fired a 105-pound (48 kg) shell at a muzzle velocity of 2,800 feet per second (850 m/s) at a rate of about 6 rounds per minute. Four of these guns were mounted in independent, armored casemates 2 inches (51 mm) thick on the main deck; the remainder were placed in broadside on the gun deck. All these guns were placed on pedestal mounts. Four of these guns could be trained directly ahead or astern, so direct fire with two 10-inch and four 6-inch was possible theoretically. All 6-inch guns could be trained through a complete angle of 115° and within the line of side armor; the latter would leave the ship's side unobstructed when going alongside a vessel, docking or coaling.

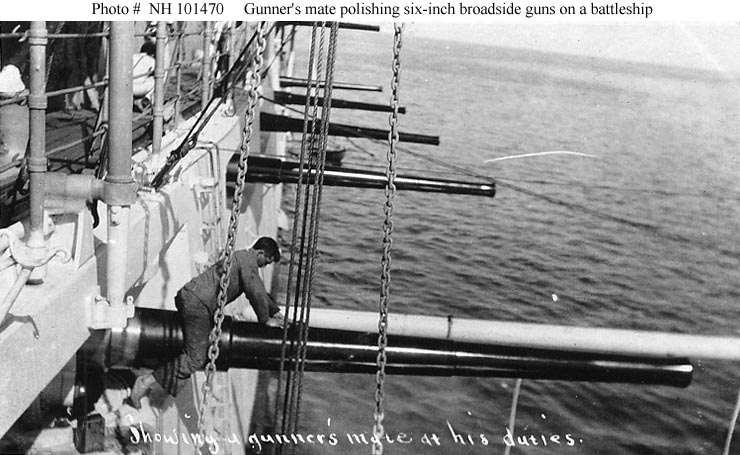
Gunner's Mate polishes 6-inch/50 broadside guns

The Mark 8 six-inch gun was used originally to arm American pre-dreadnoughts in the late 1880s. Many of these guns were reassigned as coastal artillery when the vessels to which they had been previously assigned had been scrapped as a result of the Washington Naval Treaty, the guns were then used as coastal artillery. Some were also mounted on older auxiliary vessels during World War II. Built entirely of nickel steel, the Mark 8 deviated from standard Navy practice in that its nominal caliber length was their actual overall length.

The anti-torpedo boat armament, comprised 22 3-inch (76 mm) Marks 2, 3, 5, 6 or 8 50 cal guns in single mountings — six on sponsons on the gun deck, six in broadside on the gun deck and 10 in broadside on the main deck. They fired a 13-pound (6 kg) shell at a muzzle velocity of 2,700 feet per second (820 m/s) to a range of 14,600 yards (13,350 m) at a maximum elevation of 43° at a rate of 15–20 rounds per minute. This series of built-up guns, which fired fixed ammunition, dated to the 1890s and were the standard anti-torpedo boat gun used in late pre-dreadnoughts, armored cruisers, destroyers and submarines. The guns in broadside were equipped for quick dismount. Eight of these weapons were removed from each of the three surviving ships of this class at the end of World War I.

For smaller weapons, the Tennessees carried 12 3-pounder semi-automatic guns, two 1-pounder automatic guns, two 1-pounder rapid-fire guns, two 3-inch field pieces, two .30-caliber machine guns and six .30-caliber automatic guns. These were mounted on the upper deck, bridges, in the tops, and wherever else they could secure the most commanding positions. They were to be ready at all times for repelling torpedo boat attacks and for inflicting damage upon the unprotected portion of an enemy's ship.

=== Protection ===
==== Armor ====
Despite reduced thicknesses in belt and deck armor compared to the Pennsylvania class, the Tennessees carried 30 percent more weight in armor and related protective systems and boasted the heaviest, most comprehensive protection of any U.S. cruiser until the Alaska class. This increase was due in large part to increased armor on the main turrets and redoubts, which were larger due to the increase in main gun caliber, and an increased area of side armor coverage. The latter offered ample protection to magazines and ammunition supply systems for all weapons. Armored bulkheads offered a complete subdivision of the main battery. All armor 5 inches (127 mm) or thicker was Krupp armor; thinner areas were either Harvey armor or untreated nickel steel.

The main waterline belt, 5 inches (127 mm) thick amidships and tapered to 3 inches (76 mm) at the ends, extended from the upper deck to 5 feet (2 m) below the waterline. Transverse protective bulkheads of 5-inch (127 mm) armor extended from the gun deck to the armored deck across the fore and aft ends of the belt armor. Similar bulkheads fitted on the gun deck in wake of the 10-inch barbettes form the fore and aft limits of the side armor between the main and gun decks. Above the gun deck, 2-inch (51 mm) nickel steel was fitted in wake of the 3-inch battery. The 6-inch guns on the gun deck were isolated by splinter bulkheads of 1.5-inch (38 mm) nickel steel. The bulkheads extended continuously across the ship, while 2-inch (51 mm) nickel steel extended fore and aft.

Turret armor was 9 inches (229 mm) on the sloping face, 7 inches (178 mm) on the sides, 5 inches (127 mm) in the rear and 2.5 inches (64 mm) on top. For the first time in U.S. cruiser design, proper barbettes for the turrets were fitted. The armor for these was 7 inches (178 mm) in front, tapered to 4 inches (102 mm) at the back and below the gun deck, behind the belt and casemate armor. This enclosed the 10-inch ammunition tubes completely and corrected a glaring flaw in the protective system of the Pennsylvania class. Deck armor, 1.5 inches (38 mm) over flat surfaces and 3 inches (76 mm) over sloped, extended to the bottom of the belt armor fore and aft. A 30-inch (1 m)-thick cofferdam fitted between the protective and berth decks to the ends of the vessel, were filled with water-excluding material to aid in buoyancy in case of damage below the waterline. Conning tower armor was 9 inches (230 mm) on the sides, 2 inches (51 mm) on the roof, and signal tower armor 5 inches (127 mm).

==== Subdivision ====
While the Tennessees and Pennsylvanias shared the same number of transverse bulkheads, the Tennessees were built with a greater amount of longitudinal subdivision. The inner bottom, subdivided into 35 watertight compartments, extended from the keel to the protective deck at each side and fore and aft to the knuckle of the keel. Underwater protection was further increased by continuing this subdivision up the complete side of the subsurface hull to the lower edge of the armored deck slopes. Twenty-eight electrically operated Long-Arm watertight doors and five armored hatches helped maintain watertight integrity beneath the armored deck.

== Modifications ==
Before North Carolina and Montana were laid down, the Bureau of Construction and Repair (C&R) made some minor design changes in light of experience gained from the Russo-Japanese War. Their main traverse bulkheads remained unpierced below the armored deck and some armor was rearranged. Armor on the barbettes was increased 1 inch (25 mm) on exposed surfaces. Deck armor over the magazines was thickened from 40 pounds (18 kg) to 60 pounds (27 kg) over the magazines; to make up for this weight, side armor abeam was reduced slightly. The magazines were rearranged to allow 20 percent additional 10-inch and 6-inch ammunition without sacrificing coal capacity. Rearranging the berth and gun decks amidships increased coal capacity by 200 tons. Coal bunkers were also modified to allow trimming directly from the upper bunkers to the fire rooms, which was considered potentially advantageous in battle. Throughout this review process, the Bureau sought to save weight whenever possible. For example, cellulose was omitted as water-excluding material as its utility after being packed a number a years had come into question.

In service, the Tennessees went through less refitting than the Pennsylvanias, as many features retrofitted to the latter, such as automatic ammunition hoist structures and longitudinal turret bulkheads, had already been built into the former from the outset. Their power plants were standardized, with Babcock & Wilcox boilers instead of the less reliable Niclausse that had to be removed from two of the Pennsylvanias. Also, since the Tennessees were commissioned up to three years after the first units of the Pennsylvania class, they reached obsolescence earlier in their careers.

Built originally with pole masts fore and aft, these ships were fitted with lattice masts forward and modernizing the bridges in 1912. In early 1917, Washington (by then renamed USS Seattle) was fitted with a seaplane catapult and one other Tennessee-class cruiser, probably Montana, was scheduled to receive one. While the plane was seen as a potential aid in reconnaissance, the catapult precluded use of the aft main guns. This program was cancelled and the catapult removed before the United States entered World War I. During the war, the 6-inch and 3-inch armament was removed and the corresponding ports sealed. This was done to provide guns for arming merchant ships and auxiliaries and to improve watertightness under North Atlantic conditions.

== Reevaluation ==
Even before HMS Invincible was built, questions arose in US Navy circles about the overall effectiveness of armored cruisers such as the Tennessees and what kind of ship might be built to replace them. The 1903 annual summer conference report, which included a staff memorandum on all big-gun capital ships, also mentioned a new type of fast armored cruiser that would be armed and armored much like a battleship. The following year, the summer conference considered tactics for a ship armed with four 12-inch guns, twenty-two 3-inch guns, four submerged torpedo tubes and armored like a battleship. Ships such as these were essentially Tennessee-class vessels in which the 6-inch battery had been traded for heavier main guns and protection and figured in Naval War College studies for several years. The 1906 summer conference report on a US building program advocated strongly the construction of such ships. The justification for them was two-fold: first, their use in scouting and as a fast wing in a fleet action; and second, their much greater ability over the Tennessees to stand up to 12-inch gunfire.

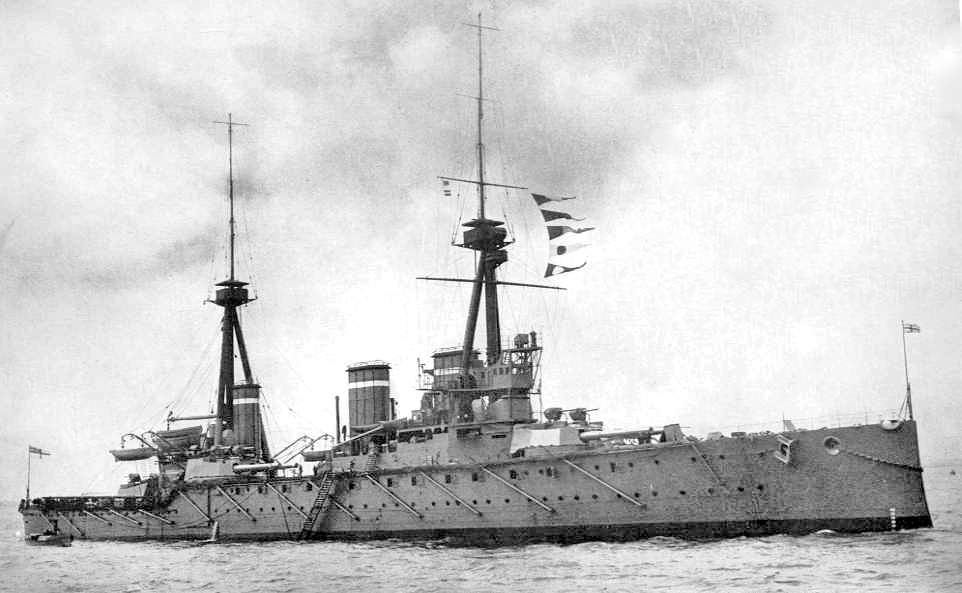
HMS Invincible

The appearance of the British Invincible-class battlecruisers in 1908 and the larger, faster ships of her class that followed reduced the viability of the Tennessee class as fighting units drastically. While some Navy circles considered the Pennsylvania and Tennessee classes the only ones "dignified enough to bear the name of armored cruiser," it was also generally agreed after the Battle of the Falkland Islands in 1914 that a battlecruiser "could destroy either a [Tennessee] or a [Pennsylvania] at extreme range without receiving enough punishment to note in the ship's log." They were outranged by the Invincibles' 12-inch (305 mm) Mk X guns, outweighed in amount of long-range metal thrown per broadside (5,100 pounds (2,300 kg) for six 850-pound (390 kg) 12-inch shells as opposed to 2,200 pounds (1,000 kg) for four 10-inch shells) and outpaced in speed (26 knots versus 22). Moreover, the turbine engines on the Invincibles could maintain 26 knots for days, if needed. Reciprocating engines such as the triple-expansion units on the Tennessees were not made for such continued punishment; pre-dreadnought battleships could not generally maintain flank speed for more than an hour.

The college tested its proposed armored cruiser against the Invincibles and other ships like them. By 1908, it had come out in favor of battlecruisers. The Secretary of the Navy requested designs from C&R for battlecruiser equivalents of the Wyoming-class ships then being considered. The Navy General Board retained these sketches but did not recommend construction. With the laying down by Japan of its Kongō-class battlecruisers in 1911, C&R was asked to return its attention to like projects, which led to its series of Lexington designs.

== Post-WWI role and potential rearmament ==
With the end of World War I in 1918, the Navy began a sharp reduction in personnel. By 1919, the Navy Board had decided to keep four of the eight remaining Pennsylvania and Tennessee-class cruisers in full commission and the other four in reserve with 65 percent of their crews on board. The ships kept in service would become flagships in foreign stations such as the Asiatic Fleet and "show the flag" at various ports. However, these ships were seen as completely outmoded, with most of their foreign equivalents either lost during the war or removed from service afterwards.

In December 1919, the Bureau of Ordnance pressed for the restoration of full armament for these ships. C&R replied with three reasons not to do so. First, restoring full armament to ships of their then-current age was not justifiable. Second, since they would serve in peacetime, their current armament would suffice. Finally, even with their 6-inch gun ports closed, they were wet ships in North Atlantic winter seas; Captain W.C. Cole, who had formerly commanded the Pennsylvania-class cruiser USS Frederick (formerly USS Maryland), remembered seeing men up to their waists in water. Whatever medium-caliber guns had been restored after the war were removed by the late 1920s.

== Modernization plans ==
After the Washington Naval Conference of 1922, the question of modernization was looked into since, by law, the three Tennessees still in service would be more powerful theoretically than any new cruisers. In May 1922, C&R studied conversion of the power plants to give them a speed of 25 or 27 knots "without excessive expenditures of power or without taking a prohibitive amount of water on board due to freeboard." A study of weight distribution showed enough similarity between these ships and the Omaha-class scouts to promise they would behave no worse than the scouts on the open seas. Discussions, which continued into 1923, included flaring the bows in keeping with the design for the now-defunct Lexington-class battlecruisers, conversion to oil burning, added torpedo protection and an armament upgrade to 8-inch (200 mm) 55 caliber guns in triple turrets. Eventually, nothing was done.

Modernization was considered again in 1928. This would include the installation of 8-inch/55 guns, an anti-aircraft battery, fire controls, oil-fired boilers and torpedo bulkheads. The estimated cost of $6 million did not include new engines. It was argued that, despite the 1922 study, a significant increase in speed would be prohibitive in cost as "the underwater lines of these ships do not lend themselves to these increases." It was conceded that without an increase in speed, the ships had little tactical value and the war plans division of OPNAV argued from the opening discussions that modernizing them would be pointless. They could still prove useful, others argued, as support for the battle fleet, where their speed would match that of current battleships. In this role, they could screen and support destroyers against enemy cruisers.

The main issue turned out to be political, with War Plans concerned that reconstruction of the Tennessees might disrupt the building of new cruisers and with doubts about whether they would compare to more modern ships, even with their superior tonnage. Costs had escalated to $17 million and it did not seem profitable to modernize ships that would be between 25 and 28 years old once modernization was complete. Also, the Bureau of Ordnance did not consider replacing their guns practical. This meant that, if these ships were kept in service 15 years after modernization, they might eventually face weapons over 40 years more advanced than their own. Despite these developments, detailed studies continued.

C&R found it could install a 58,000–shaft horsepower power plant similar to one planned for the new aircraft carrier USS Ranger without disturbing the existing shaft lines of the cruisers; this would give them a speed of 26 knots. The Bureau of Ordnance could increase elevation of the 10-inch guns to 40 degrees, which would increase their range to 31,000 yards (28,000 m). However, in a comparison with the Pensacola-class ships then being built, the newer ships showed themselves at an advantage in gunnery range and equal in protection. Modernization plans were thereby abandoned.

== Ships ==
Construction data
Original name	Laid down	Launched	Commissioned	Renamed	Renaming date	Reclassified	Reclassification date
USS Tennessee (ACR-10)	9 February 1903	3 December 1904	17 July 1906	Memphis (ACR-10)	25 May 1916	sunk before reclassified	N/A
USS Washington (ACR-11)	10 February 1903	18 March 1905	7 August 1906	Seattle (ACR-11)	9 November 1916	Seattle (CA-11)	17 July 1920
USS North Carolina (ACR-12)	21 March 1905	6 October 1906	7 May 1908	Charlotte (ACR-12)	7 June 1920	Charlotte (CA-12)	-
USS Montana (ACR-13)	29 April 1905	15 December 1906	21 July 1908	Missoula (ACR-13)	7 June 1920	Missoula (CA-13)	17 July 1920

=== USS Tennessee ===
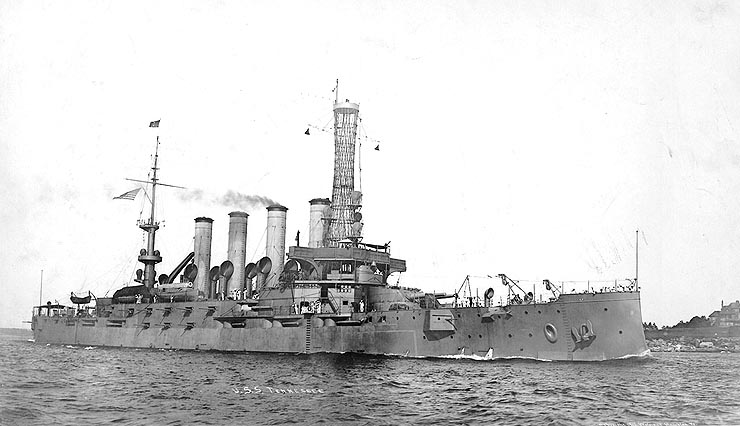
USS Tennessee

In November 1906, USS Tennessee escorted President Theodore Roosevelt (aboard the battleship Louisiana) to Panama to inspect construction of the canal there. She then attended the Jamestown Exposition naval review and made a brief cruise to Europe. After two and a half years with the Pacific Fleet, Tennessee visited Argentina during that nation's independence celebration, carried President William Howard Taft to the Panama Canal and operated in the western Atlantic and the Gulf of Mexico. In the eastern Mediterranean, she protected American interests and transported refugees during the Middle Eastern turmoil that accompanied the First Balkan War of 1912–13. Service in the Atlantic Fleet followed. Tennessee returned to the Mediterranean in August 1914 to conduct humanitarian missions and otherwise "show the flag" as the First World War spread through Europe and into the Turkish empire. Back in the U.S. by August 1915, she carried Marines to Haiti and until February 1916 was actively involved the effort to establish order in that strife-torn nation. Between March and May 1916, Tennessee transported Secretary of the Treasury William G. McAdoo and other dignitaries on a South American cruise. Late in the latter month she was renamed Memphis, allowing reassignment of her original name to a planned new battleship. During the early summer the cruiser took Marine reinforcements to the Dominican Republic, also suffering from revolutionary violence. On 29 August 1916, while at anchor off Santo Domingo, USS Memphis was driven ashore by a wind-generated ocean wave (possibly a rogue wave). She lost more than three-dozen crewmen and was battered beyond reasonable prospect of repair. Left where she lay, the wreck was sold in 1922 but not broken up until 1938.

=== USS Washington ===
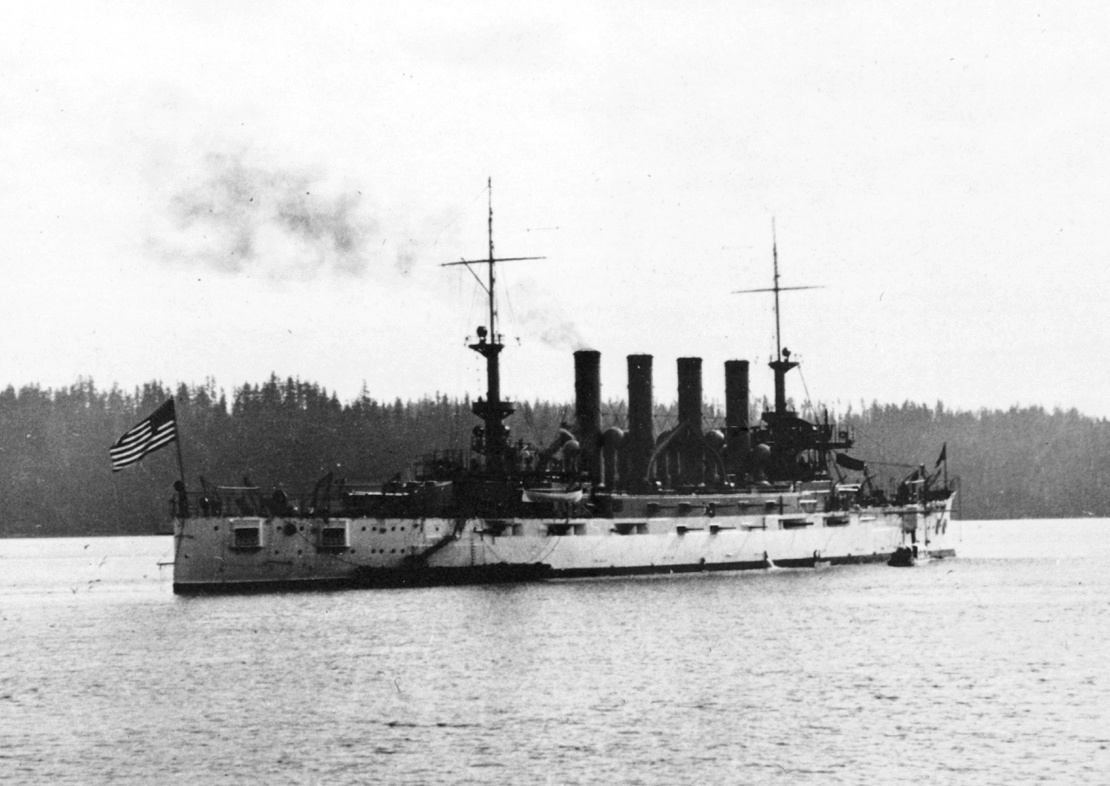
USS Washington

With USS Tennessee, USS Washington escorted USS Louisiana and President Roosevelt to Panama and participated the Jamestown Exposition. She and Tennessee visited France and returned to run speed trials. She and Tennessee then joined the Pacific Fleet; en route, the two armored cruisers called at Hampton Roads; Port-of-Spain, Trinidad; British West Indies; Rio de Janeiro, Brazil; Montevideo, Uruguay; Punta Arenas, Chile; Callao, Peru; Acapulco, Mexico; and Pichilinque Bay, Mexico. While on Pacific service, Washington "showed the flag" with the rest of the Armored Cruiser Squadron in the Far East and South America. After an overhaul at the Norfolk Navy Yard, she returned to the Atlantic Fleet in 1912; among her duties was embarking the Secretary of State and his party on a cruise of South American between February and April 1912. Washington served as temporary flagship in April–May 1912 while at the Philadelphia Navy Yard, then made several trips to the Dominican Republic and Haiti to help maintain an American presence in light of civil unrest and stood by to land Marines if the situation so required. Renamed Seattle in 1916, she served as flagship of the Destroyer Force and escort for the first American convoy to European waters and continued on escort duties during World War I. This convoy was attacked unsuccessfully by a German U-boat; according to Admiral Gleaves in his report of the commander of the Atlantic Fleet, Seattle's veering out of formation and sounding her whistle to warn the others vessels probably thwarted the attack. After the Armistice, she operated as a transport until 5 July 1919. Later, she rejoined the Pacific Fleet and was placed in "reduced commission". She returned to the Atlantic in 1927 and was redesignated "unclassified" in 1931. Docked in New York City, she served as a floating barracks until struck from the Navy List and scrapped in 1946.

=== USS North Carolina ===
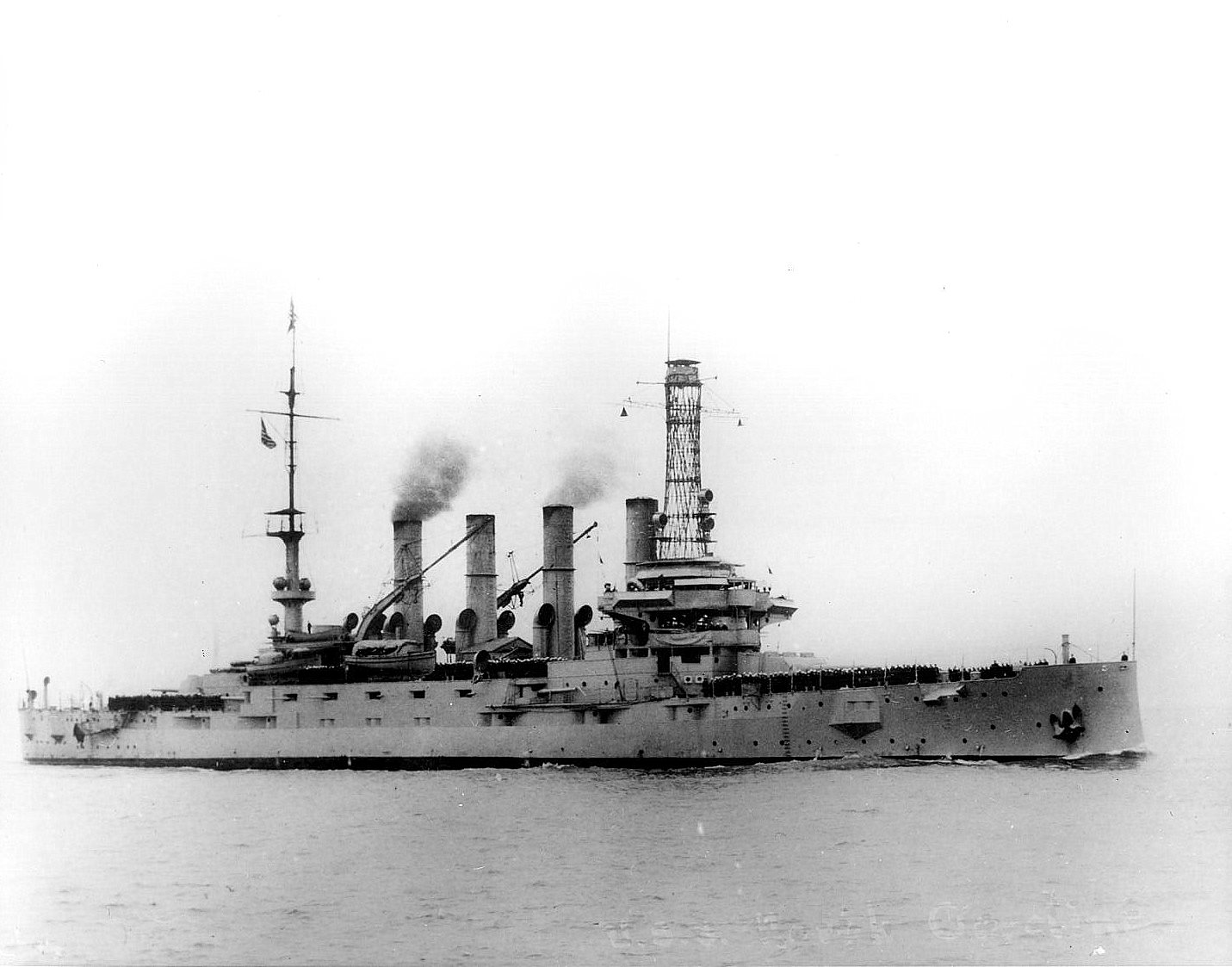
USS North Carolina

After carrying President-elect William Howard Taft to inspect the Panama Canal in January and February 1909, USS North Carolina cruised the Mediterranean with USS Montana to protect American interests during the aftermath of the Turkish Revolution of 1908. She sent a medical relief party ashore 17 May to Adana, Turkey to treat wounded and desperately ill Armenian victims of massacre, provided food, shelter, disinfectants, distilled water, dressings and medicines and assisted other relief agencies already on the scene. For the remainder of her Mediterranean cruise, North Carolina cruised the Levant succoring American citizens and refugees from oppression. On her return, she served in the western Atlantic and Caribbean. She attended centennial celebrations of the independence of Argentina in May–June 1910 and Venezuela in June–July 1911, carried the Secretary of War for an inspection tour of Puerto Rico, Santo Domingo, Cuba, and the Panama Canal in July–August 1911 and brought home from Cuba bodies of the crew of the destroyed Maine for their final interment in Arlington National Cemetery. As World War I began in Europe, she and USS Tennessee called at ports of England and France and cruised the Mediterranean as a continued U.S. presence in the region before she returned to Boston 18 June 1915 for overhaul. On 5 September 1915, North Carolina became the first ship ever to launch an aircraft by catapult while under way. When the U.S. entered the war, she escorted troop transports plying between Norfolk and New York. Between December 1918 and July 1919, she brought men of the American Expeditionary Force home from Europe. Renamed Charlotte in 1920 so that her original name might be assigned to a new battleship, she decommissioned at Puget Sound Navy Yard, Bremerton, Washington, 18 February 1921. She was struck from the Naval Vessel Register and scrapped in 1930.

=== USS Montana ===
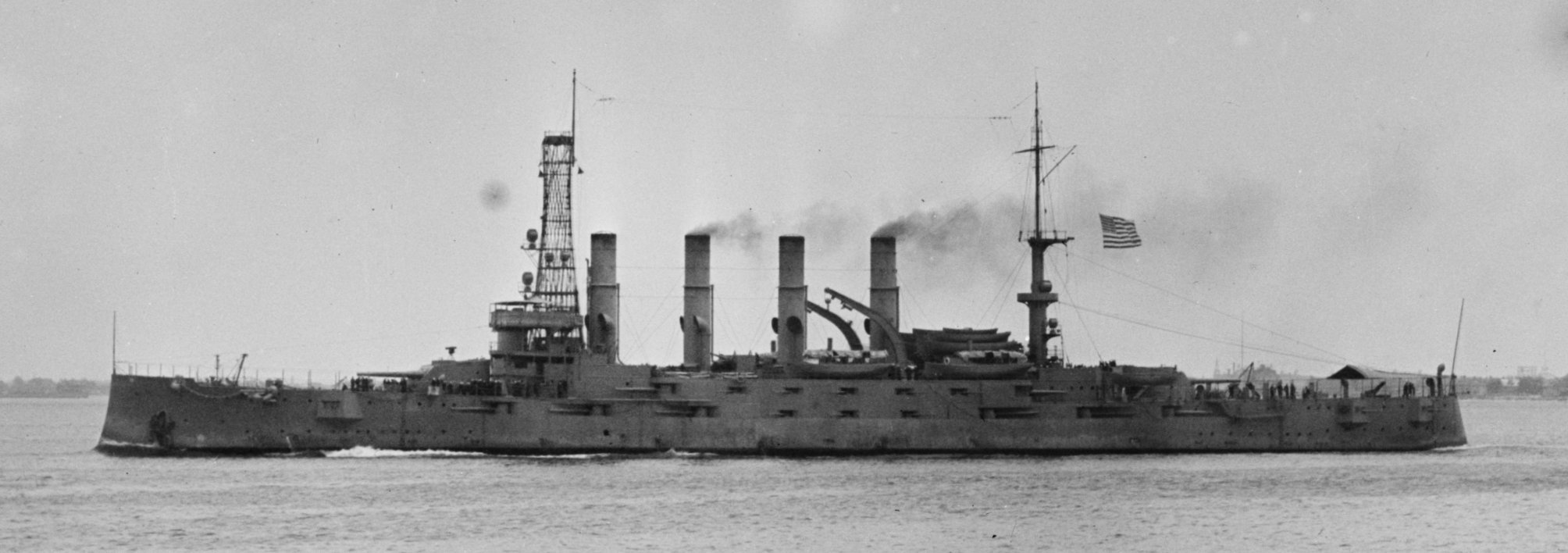
USS Montana

Assigned to the Atlantic Fleet, USS Montana sailed in January 1909 for the Caribbean, then to the Mediterranean to protect American interests in the aftermath of the Turkish Revolution of 1908. Upon her return, she took part in the Argentine Centennial Celebration and took President Taft to Panama. After a major overhaul, she sailed on a second tour of the Near East between December 1912 and June 1913. During the first months of World War I, Montana conducted training exercises and transported supplies and men in the York River area and along the east coast, then did convoy and escort duty through most of 1917 and 1918 out of Hampton Roads, New York and Halifax, Nova Scotia. She also performed as a Naval Academy practice ship in the Chesapeake Bay area early in 1918 and, in six round trips from Europe from January to July 1919, brought home 8,800 American troops. Renamed Missoula and reclassified in 1920, she was decommissioned in 1921, struck from the Naval Vessel Register in 1930 and scrapped in 1935 in accordance with the London Naval Treaty.

== See also ==
- List of cruisers of the United States Navy

== Bibliography ==
=== Sources ===
- "The Tennessee Accident". Service Items. The Navy. Washington DC: Navy Publishing Company. June 1908.
- Brassey, Thomas Allnutt, ed. (2011). Brassey's annual: the armed forces year-book, Volume 1901. Nabu Press. hdl:2027/mdp.39015036624735. ISBN 978-1-248-25595-7. ISSN 0068-0702. LCCN 12030905. OCLC 1537003.
- Brown, David K. (2003). The Grand Fleet: Warship Design and Development 1906–1922 (reprint of the 1999 ed.). London, UK: Caxton Editions. ISBN 1-84067-531-4. OCLC 59292818.
- Burr, Lawrence (2008). US Cruisers 1883–1904: The Birth of the Steel Navy. London, UK: Osprey Publishing. ISBN 978-1-84603-267-7. OCLC 190967874.
- Chesneau, Roger (1979). Conway's All the World's Fighting Ships, 1860-1905. London: Harper Collins. ISBN 978-0-85177-133-5. LCCN 79319725. OCLC 654432504.
- Cooper, Michael L. (2009). Theodore Roosevelt: A Twentieth-century Life. New York, NY: Viking Press. ISBN 978-1-101-16278-1. LCCN 2010279534. OCLC 262428550.
- Dalton, Kathleen (2002). Theodore Roosevelt: A Strenuous Life. New York, NY: Vintage Books. ISBN 0-679-76733-9. LCCN 2002022857. OCLC 54438964.
- DiGiulian, Tony (26 December 2008). "USA 10"/40 (25.4 cm) Mark 3". NavWeaps.com. Tony DiGiulian.
- DiGiulian, Tony (3 November 2011). "United States of America 6"/50 (15.2 cm) Mark 6 and Mark 8". NavWeaps.com. Tony DiGiulian.
- DiGiulian, Tony (12 February 2012). "United States of America 3"/50 (7.62 cm) Marks 2, 3, 5, 6 and 8". NavWeaps.com. Tony DiGiulian.
- Dunlap, John Robertson; Going, Charles B.; Suplee, Henry Harrison, eds. (December 1902). "The Speed of Armored Cruisers" (pdf). Engineering Magazine: An Industrial Review. XXIV (12). New York, NY: The Engineering Press: 442–443. ISSN 0096-3682. OCLC 829735302.
- Evans, David C.; Peattie, Mark R. (1997). Kaigun: Strategy, Tactics, and Technology in the Imperial Japanese Navy, 1887-1941. Annapolis, MD: Naval Institute Press. pp. 52–53. ISBN 978-0-87021-192-8. OCLC 897464699.
- Friedman, Norman (1984). US Cruisers: An Illustrated History. Annapolis, MD: Naval Institute Press. ISBN 978-0-87021-718-0. LCCN 84014767. OCLC 10949320.
- Hogg, Ian V.; Thurston, L.F. (1972). British Artillery Weapons & Ammunition 1914–1918. London, UK: Ian Allan. ISBN 978-0-7110-0381-1. LCCN 73159835. OCLC 641181.
- Hovgaard, William (1905). "The Cruiser". Transactions: The Society of Naval Architects and Marine Engineers. Vol. 13. New York, NY: Society of Naval Architects and Marine Engineers.
- Kenney, Lewis Hobart (February 1906). "U.S. Armored Cruiser Tennessee" (pdf). Journal of the American Society of Naval Engineers. XVIII (2). Washington, DC: American Society of Naval Engineers: 385–464. doi:10.1111/j.1559-3584.1906.tb05791.x. OCLC 780166707.
- Lambert, Nicholas A. (2002). Sir John Fisher's Naval Revolution. Studies in Maritime History. Columbia, SC: University of South Carolina Press. ISBN 978-1-57003-492-3. LCCN 99006012. OCLC 1355231253.
- Leyland, John (29 November 1902). "The Seapower of the Nations" (pdf). Navy and Army Illustrated. XV (304). Lopndon, UK: Hudson & Kearns: 259–260. ISSN 0000-5517. OCLC 7489254.
- Marolda, Edward J. (2001). Theodore Roosevelt, the U.S. Navy, and the Spanish–American War. The World of the Roosevelts. New York, NY: Palgrave Macmillan US. ISBN 978-0-312-24023-3. LCCN 2001032757. OCLC 46975076.
- Morison, Samuel Loring; Polmar, Norman (2003). The American Battleship. St. Paul, MN: MBI. ISBN 978-0-7603-0989-6. LCCN 2002032687. OCLC 50478540.
- Musicant, Ivan (1985). U.S. Armored Cruisers: A Design and Operational History. Annapolis, MD: US Naval Institute Press. ISBN 978-0-87021-714-2. LCCN 85004868. OCLC 11738874.
- O'Brien, Phillips Payson (2007). Technology and Naval Combat in the Twentieth Century and Beyond. Cass Series: Naval Policy and History Series. London, UK: Routledge. ISBN 978-0-415-44936-6. LCCN 00069447. OCLC 900235505.
- Osborne, Eric W. (2004). Cruisers and Battle Cruisers: An Illustrated History of Their Impact. Weapons and Warfare. Santa Barbara, CA: ABC-CLIO. ISBN 978-1-85109-369-4. LCCN 2004020200. OCLC 60395219.
- Pike, John (1 January 1970). "ACR-10 Tennessee / CA-10 Memphis". GlobalSecurity.org.
- Roberts, Stephen S. (2021). French Warships in the Age of Steam, 1859-1914: Design, Construction, Careers and Fates (1st ed.). Barnsley, UK: Seaforth Publishing. p. 432. ISBN 978-1-5267-4533-0. OCLC 1245658238.
- Ropp, Theodore (1987). Roberts, Stephen S. (ed.). The Development of a Modern Navy: French Naval Policy, 1871–1904. Annapolis, MD: Naval Institute Press. ISBN 978-0-87021-141-6. OCLC 15016582.
- Symonds, Craig L.; Clipson, William J.; United States Naval Institute (1995). The Naval Institute Historical Atlas of the U.S. Navy. Annapolis, MD: US Naval Institute Press. ISBN 978-1-55750-984-0. LCCN 2001622024. OCLC 46324744.
- "Our New Armored Cruisers" (pdf). The Navy. II (7). New York, NY: Navy Publishing Company: 5. July 1908.
- "U.S.S. Pennsylvania: Class of Eight Armored Cruisers (1905)". cityofart.com. 23 January 2010. Archived from the original on 4 January 2011.
- "Montana I (Armored Cruiser No. 13)". DANFS. Naval History and Heritage Command. 4 February 2004.
- "North Carolina II (Armored Cruiser No. 12)". DANFS. Naval History and Heritage Command. 9 January 2004.
- "USS Tennessee (Armored Cruiser # 10), 1906-1916. Renamed Memphis in May 1916". DANFS. Naval History and Heritage Command. 4 February 2004. Archived from the original on 13 March 2012.
- "Washington VII (Armored Cruiser No. 11)". DANFS. Naval History and Heritage Command. 4 February 2004.
