= 10-inch/40-caliber gun Mark 3 =

10"/40 caliber Mark 3 Naval Gun
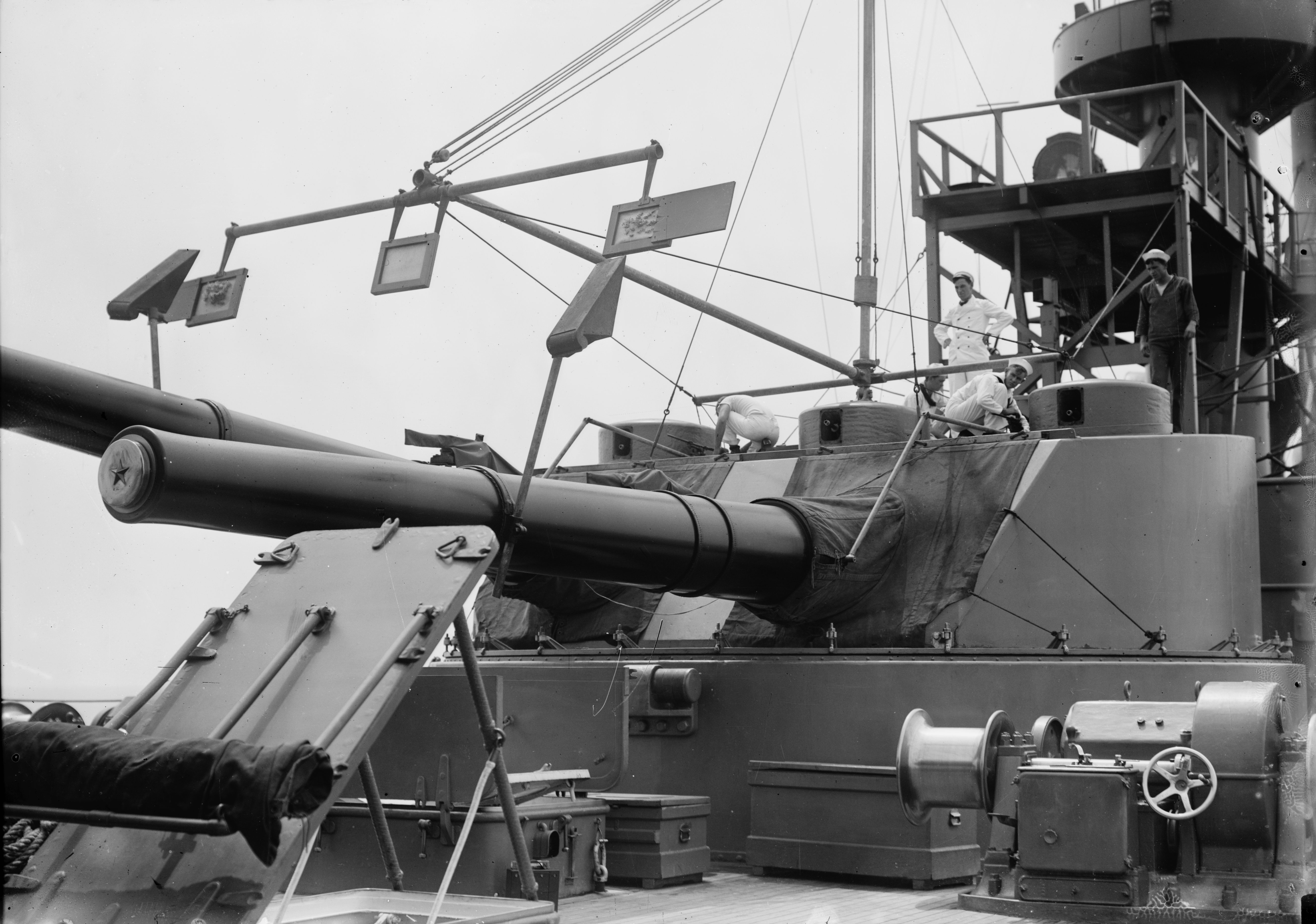
- USS Washington (ACR-11) - 10-inch gun practice.
- Type: Naval gun
- Place of origin: United States

Service history
- In service: 1902
- Used by: United States Navy
- Wars: World War I

Production history
- Designer: Bureau of Ordnance
- Designed: 1899
- Manufacturer: U.S. Naval Gun Factory
- No. built: 21 (Nos. 27–47)
- Variants: Mark 3

Specifications
- Mass: 74,836 lb (33,945 kg) (without breech); 79,500 lb (36,100 kg) (with breech)
- Length: 413 in (10,500 mm)
- Barrel length: 400 in (10,000 mm) bore (40 calibers)
- Shell: 510 lb (230 kg) armor-piercing
- Caliber: 10 in (254 mm)
- Elevation: -3° to +14°
- Traverse: −150° to +150°
- Rate of fire: 2 – 3 rounds per minute
- Muzzle velocity: 2,700 ft/s (820 m/s)
- Effective firing range: 20,000 yd (18,288 m) at 14.5° elevation

The 10"/40 caliber gun Mark 3 (spoken "ten-inch-forty-caliber") was used for the main batteries of the United States Navy's last generation of armored cruisers, the Tennessee-class. The Mark 3s were the last, and most powerful, 10-inch (254 mm) guns built for the US Navy.

== Design of the Mark 3 ==
The Navy's Policy Board call for a variety of large caliber weapons in 1890, with ranges all the way up to 16-inch (406 mm), to use the new smokeless powder that had recently been adopted by the Navy. Because of this new propellant, projectiles could accelerate all the way along the gun barrel, which allowed for barrels of 40, or more, calibers long. This led to the development of the 10-inch/40 caliber gun.

The Mark 3 was specifically designed for the Tennessee-class armored cruisers, numbered in order after the Mark 1 and Mark 2s, Nos. 27–47, with No. 27 being delivered in February 1906. Nos. 27–31, 36, and 45 were all Mod 0s, with Nos. 37–44, 46, and 47 being Mod 1s. The initial Mod 2s were Nos. 32–35, with other later converted to Mod 2. These were all constructed of gun steel. The 10-inch Mark 3 Mod 0 was built in a length of 40 calibers, had a tube, jacket and four hoops with a locking ring, and a screw box liner, all of which were manufactured out of nickel-steel. The Mark 3 Mod 1s only differed from the Mod 0 in the shape of the front of their chambers and the Mod 2 had a conical nickel-steel liner that was the same length as the tube, with the chamber volume being slightly reduced.

== Naval Service ==
Ship	Gun Installed	Gun Mount
USS Tennessee (ACR-10)	Mark 3: 10"/40 caliber	Mark 6: 2 × twin turrets
USS Washington (ACR-11)	Mark 3: 10"/40 caliber	Mark 6: 2 × twin turrets
USS North Carolina (ACR-12)	Mark 3: 10"/40 caliber	Mark 6: 2 × twin turrets
USS Montana (ACR-13)	Mark 3: 10"/40 caliber	Mark 6: 2 × twin turrets

== See also ==
=== Weapons of comparable role, performance and era ===
- 10-inch gun M1895 - Army gun of similar size and era
- BL 9.2-inch Mk IX – X naval gun - contemporary British naval and coast defense weapon
- Canon de 240 L Mle 1884 - contemporary French coast defense, siege, and railway weapon
