= USS North Carolina (ACR-12) =

United States Navy Tennessee-class armored cruiser

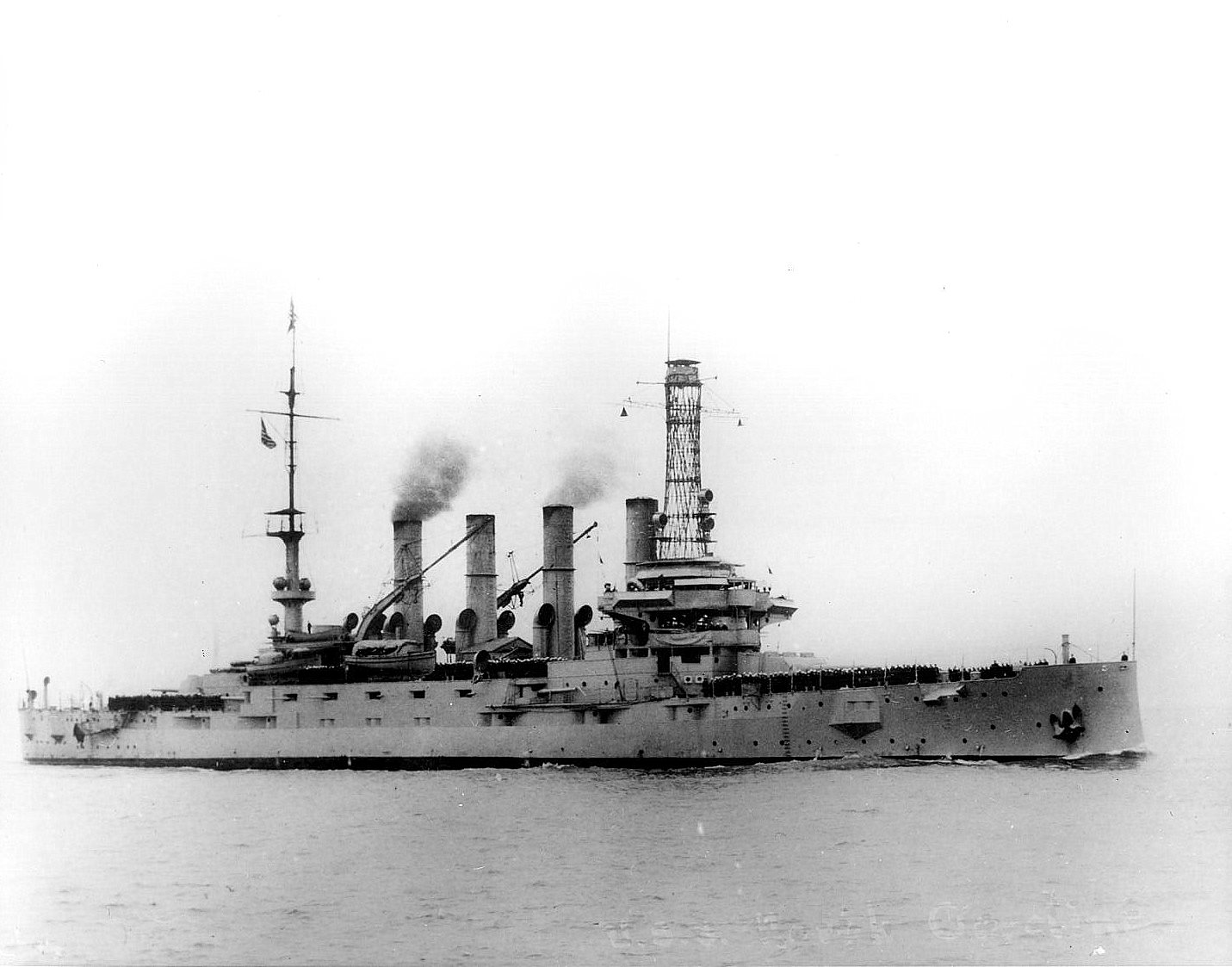
- USS North Carolina (ACR-12), starboard bow view while underway, date and location unknown.

History

United States
- Name: North Carolina (1908-1920)
- Namesake: State of North Carolina
- Builder: Newport News Drydock & Shipbuilding Co., Newport News, Virginia
- Laid down: 21 March 1905
- Launched: 6 October 1906
- Commissioned: 7 May 1908
- Decommissioned: 18 February 1921
- Renamed: Charlotte, 7 June 1920
- Stricken: 15 July 1930
- Fate: Sold for scrap, 29 September 1930

General characteristics
- Class & type: Tennessee-class armored cruiser
- Displacement: 14,500 long tons (14,733 t) (standard); 15,981 long tons (16,237 t) (full load)
- Length: 504 ft 5 in (153.75 m) oa
- Beam: 72 ft 10 in (22.20 m)
- Draft: 25 ft (7.6 m)
- Installed power: 16 × Babcock & Wilcox boilers; 23,000 ihp (17,000 kW)
- Propulsion: 2 × Triple expansion steam engines
- Speed: 22 knots (41 km/h; 25 mph)
- Complement: 914
- Armament: 4 × 10 in (254 mm)/ 40 caliber Mark 3 guns; 16 × 6 in (152 mm)/50 caliber Mark 8 guns; 22 × 3 in (76 mm)/50 caliber guns; 12 × 3-pounder guns; 4 × 1-pounder guns; 4 × 21 inch (533 mm) torpedo tubes
- Armor: Belt: 5 in (127 mm); Deck: 3 in (76 mm); Turrets: 9 in (229 mm); Conning tower: 9 in

USS North Carolina (hull number ACR-12/CA-12) was a Tennessee-class armored cruiser of the United States Navy. The ship was built by Newport News Shipbuilding; she was laid down in March 1905, launched in October 1906, and was commissioned in May 1908. The final class of armored cruisers to be built for the US Navy, North Carolina and her sisters were armed with a main battery of four 10-inch (254 mm) guns, and were capable of a top speed of 22 knots (41 km/h; 25 mph).

North Carolina spent much of her career in the Atlantic Ocean and Caribbean Sea conducting training and visiting foreign countries. She went on short deployments to the Mediterranean Sea twice, the first in 1909 to protect American citizens in the Ottoman Empire, and the second during World War I, again to protect still neutral American citizens in the region. After the United States entered the war in April 1917, North Carolina was used to escort troop ships off the eastern coast of the United States. Following the war in late 1918 and early 1919, she was used to carry soldiers from the American Expeditionary Force back from France. In 1920, the ship was renamed Charlotte so her original name could be used for a new battleship, and she was decommissioned the following year. She was sold for scrap in September 1930 and broken up thereafter.

== Design ==
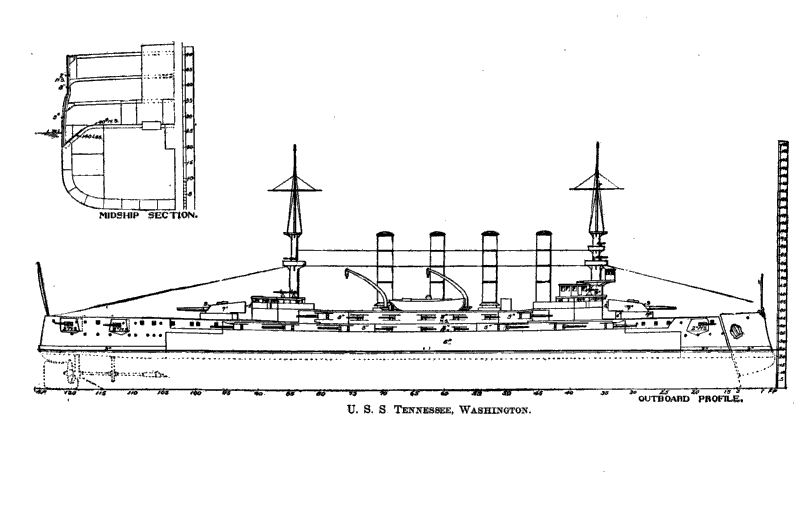
Line-drawing of a Tennessee-class cruiser, with mid-ship cross section

North Carolina was 504 ft 6 in (153.77 m) long overall and had beam of 72 feet 10 inches (22.20 m) and a draft of 25 ft (7.6 m). She displaced 14,500 long tons (14,700 t) normally and up to 15,981 long tons (16,237 t) at full load. The ship was propelled by two 4-cylinder, vertical triple-expansion engines, with steam provided by sixteen coal-fired Babcock & Wilcox water-tube boilers trunked into four funnels. The engines were rated at 23,000 indicated horsepower (17,000 kW), which produced a top speed of 22 knots (25 mph; 41 km/h). She had a storage capacity for up to 2,000 long tons (2,000 t) of coal, which allowed her to steam for 6,500 nautical miles (12,000 km; 7,500 mi) at a speed of 10 knots (19 km/h; 12 mph). She had a crew of 914 officers and men. Originally fitted with a pair of military masts, North Carolina had her foremast replaced with a cage mast in 1911.

North Carolina was armed with a main battery of four 10-inch (254 mm) 40-caliber Mark 3 guns in two twin gun turrets, one forward and one aft. These were supported by a secondary battery of sixteen 6-inch (152 mm) 40-caliber Mark 8 guns mounted in casemates, eight on each broadside. For defense against torpedo boats, she carried twenty-two 3-inch (76 mm) 50-caliber guns in single pedestal mounts either in casemates or sponsons in the hull. She also carried a variety of smaller guns, including twelve 3-pounder automatic guns and four 1-pounders. Like other contemporary armored cruisers, she was also armed with four 21 inches (533 mm) torpedo tubes located below the waterline in her hull. North Carolina was protected by a combination of Krupp cemented steel and older Harvey steel. The ship's armored belt was 5 in (127 mm) thick and the maximum thickness of the armor deck was 3 in thick. The main battery turret faces were 9 in (229 mm) thick, as were the sides of the conning tower.

== Service history ==
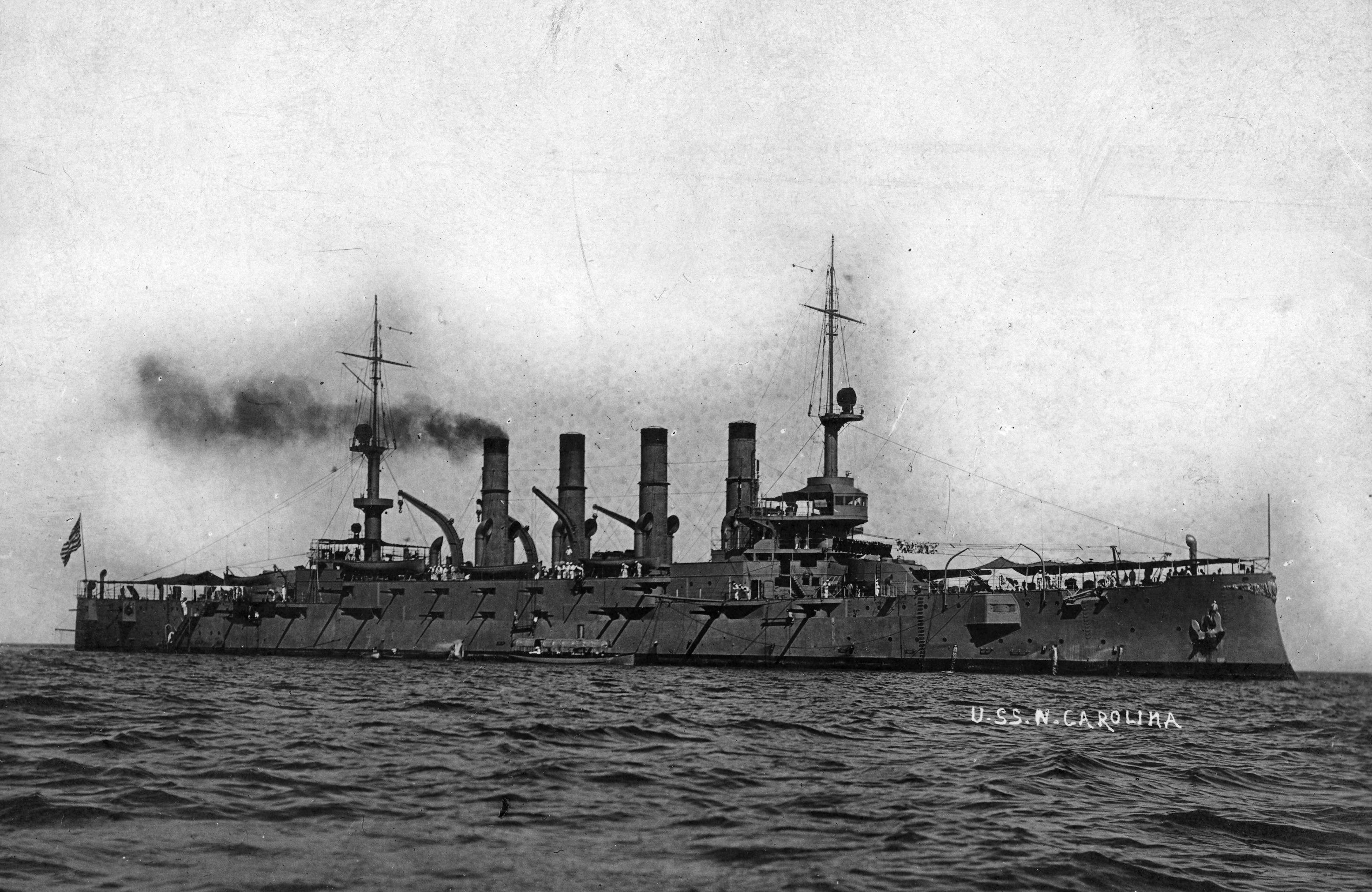
North Carolina, date unknown

The keel for North Carolina was laid down at the Newport News Shipbuilding shipyard in Newport News, Virginia, on 21 March 1905. She was launched on 6 October 1906, and after completing fitting-out, was commissioned into the fleet on 7 May 1908. She thereafter began a shakedown cruise along the eastern coast of the United States, down to the Caribbean Sea. After returning to the United States, she embarked President-elect William Howard Taft for a tour of the Panama Canal, then still under construction. The voyage lasted from January to February 1909. Starting on 23 April, North Carolina began a cruise in the Mediterranean Sea to protect United States citizens from domestic unrest in the Ottoman Empire. While in Adana on 17 May, the ship sent a landing party ashore to render medical aid to sick and wounded Armenians who had been attacked in an anti-Armenian massacre. North Carolina also sent food, water, and other supplies to help the situation, before continuing her patrol in the eastern Mediterranean. She returned to the United States on 3 August.

For the next eight years, North Carolina conducted training exercises in the Atlantic Ocean and the Caribbean and visited other countries in the region to show the flag. She represented the United States at Argentina's centennial celebration of its independence in May and June 1910, followed by Venezuela's centennial in June and July 1911. She carried the United States Secretary of War, Henry L. Stimson, on a tour of the Caribbean, stopping in Puerto Rico, Santo Domingo, Cuba, and the Panama Canal in July and August. At the conclusion of that trip, she returned to New York City with the remains of a sailor from the armored cruiser Maine, which had been destroyed in 1898 in Havana, Cuba. In October, North Carolina underwent maintenance at Portsmouth Naval Shipyard—during her stay, a team of her crew played against the 1911 New Hampshire football team in nearby Durham, New Hampshire. The rest of her early career passed uneventfully.

On 7 August 1914, as World War I broke out in Europe, North Carolina was sent on a patrol in the Mediterranean to protect then still neutral United States citizens in the region. She visited Jaffa, Beirut, and Alexandria before returning to Boston on 18 June, where she underwent an overhaul. The ship thereafter went to Pensacola, Florida, where she arrived on 9 September, to conduct experiments with naval aviation. She became the first ship to launch an aircraft using a catapult while underway on 5 November; these tests led to the widespread use of aircraft catapults aboard battleships and cruisers through the 1940s.

Following the United States' entry into World War I on 6 April 1917, North Carolina was employed as an escort for troop ships traveling between Norfolk and New York. Starting in December 1918, after the war had ended, she assisted in the repatriation of American soldiers from the American Expeditionary Force; this effort lasted until July 1919. On 7 June 1920, North Carolina was renamed Charlotte so that her name could be used for a new South Dakota-class battleship then under construction. Charlotte remained in service only briefly under her new name before being decommissioned on 18 February 1921 at the Puget Sound Navy Yard in Bremerton, Washington. She was stricken from the Naval Vessel Register on 15 July 1930 and was sold for scrap on 29 September.
