= Pichilinque =

- Interactive map of Pichilinque
- Location in Mexico

Location
- Country: Mexico
- Location: Baja California Sur
- Coordinates: 24°16′34″N 110°19′40″W
- UN/LOCODE: MXPIC

Details
- No. of berths: 12
- Draft depth: 9.50 metres (31.2 ft)

Pichilinque is a port facility and port city in the La Paz Municipality, in the state of Baja California Sur, Mexico. It is located in the Bay of La Paz, on the Baja California peninsula nearby the state capital of La Paz.

Pichilinque, derived from a Guaycura name, was originally a favored anchorage in the Bay of La Paz. This anchorage was used by the U. S. Navy for a base of operations against the west coast of Mexico during the Mexican–American War. It later developed into a port. Two ferry services operate from the port of Pichilinque, connecting the Baja California peninsula to the mainland at Mazatlán and Topolobampo, near Los Mochis.
