= August 1916 =

Month in 1916

<<	August 1916					>>
Su	Mo	Tu	We	Th	Fr	Sa
		1	2	3	4	5
6	7	8	9	10	11	12
13	14	15	16	17	18	19
20	21	22	23	24	25	26
27	28	29	30	31

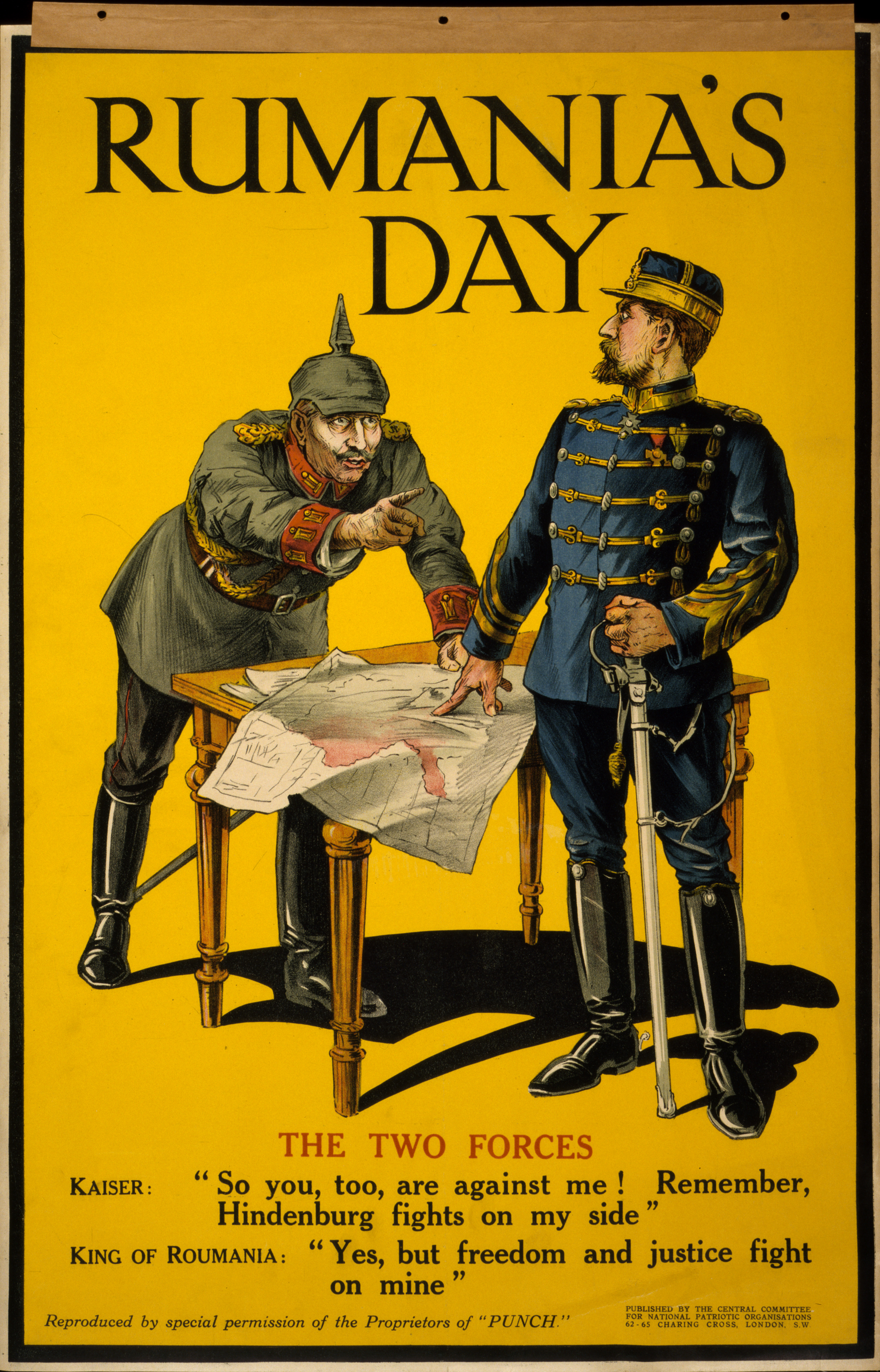
British poster, welcoming Romania's decision to join the Entente

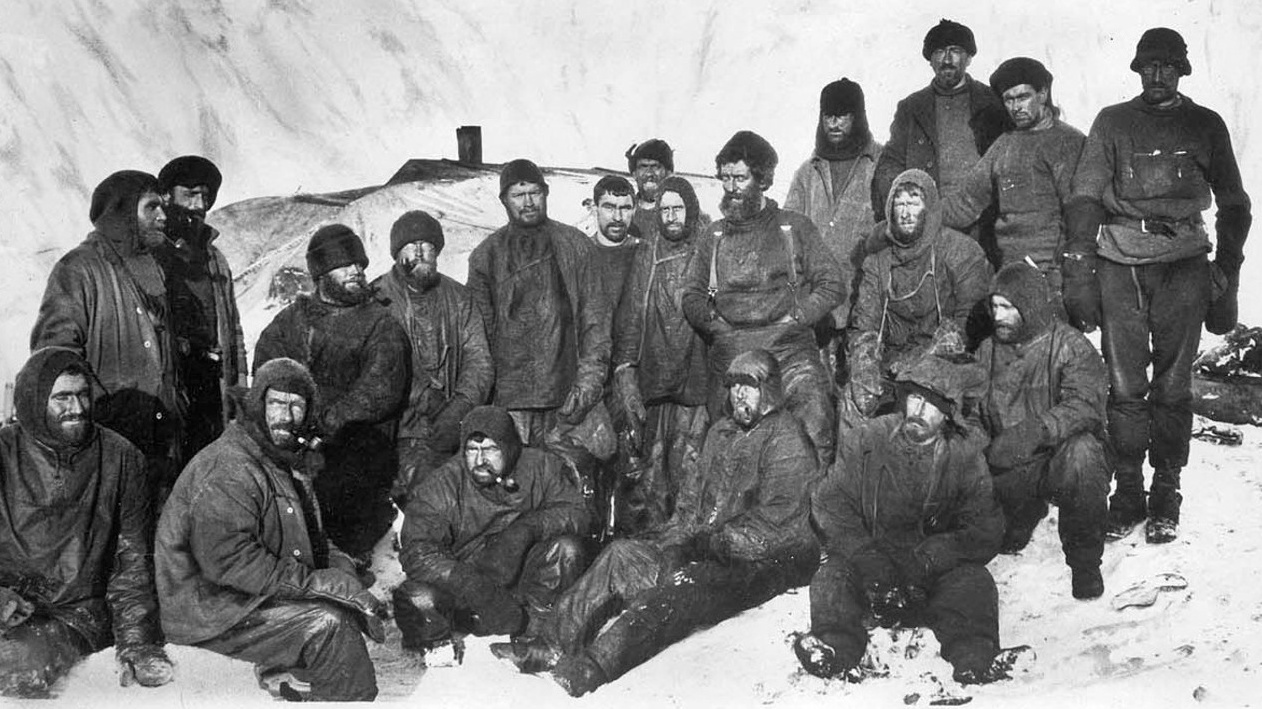
The marroned Elephant Island party of the Imperial Trans-Antarctic Expedition, before they were rescued by expedition leader Ernest Shackleton on August 30 with help from Chile.

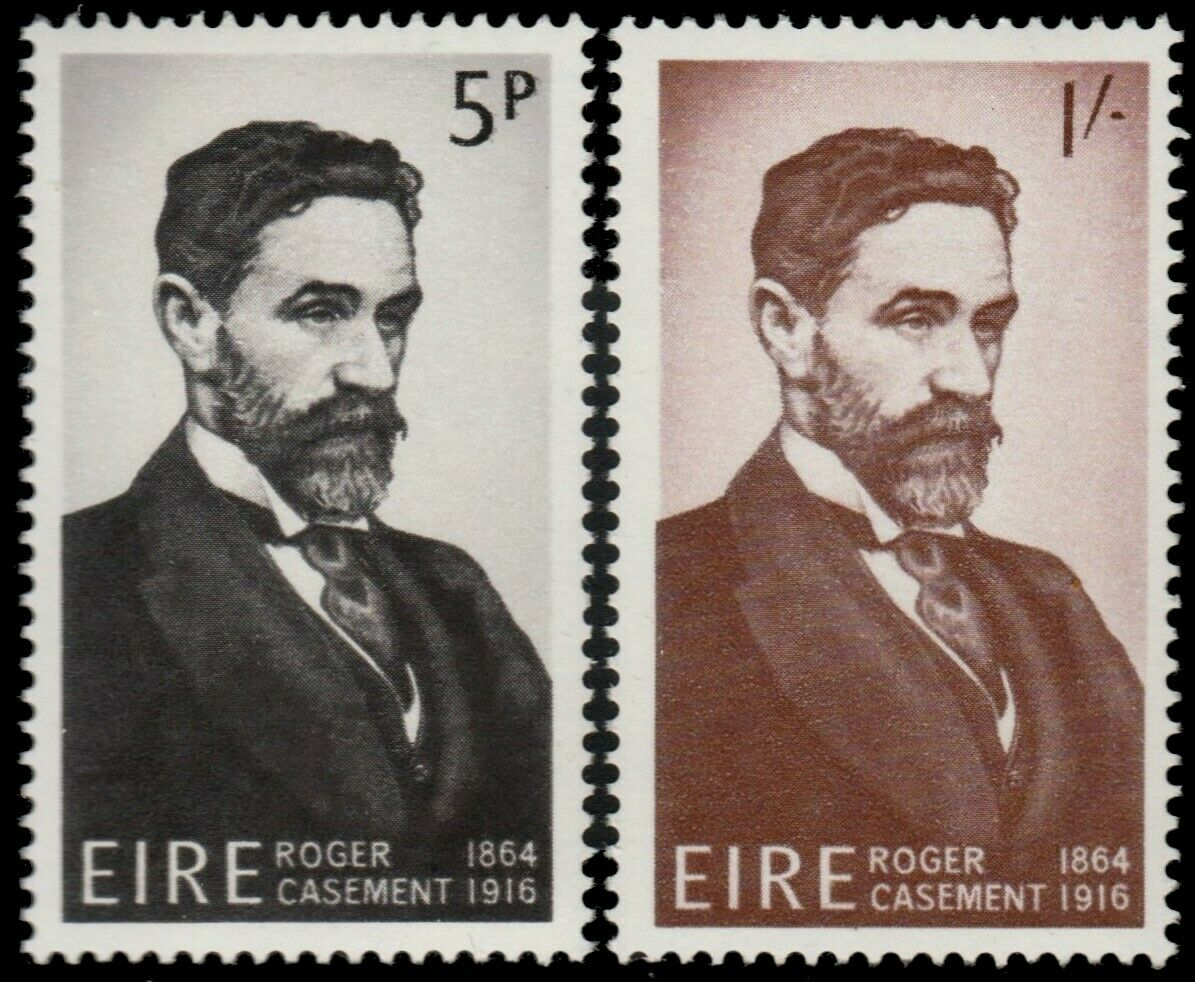
1966 Ireland stamps commemorating the 50th anniversary of Roger Casement's death, executed for treason for his role in the Easter Rising.

The following events occurred in August 1916:

== August 1, 1916 (Tuesday) ==
- Battle of Verdun – The Germans launched a new attack on Fort Souville, forcing a two-week campaign of French counterattacks.
- Battle of Bitlis – The Russian Caucasus Army, supported by Armenian militia, attacked the Ottoman Second Army in Bitlis Province located in eastern Turkey.
- Anglo-Egyptian Darfur Expedition – Talks of surrender broke down between the Anglo-Egyptian force commanded by Philip James Vandeleur Kelly and Sultan Ali Dinar of the Sultanate of Darfur, leader of a rebellion against British colonial rule in what is now Sudan. Dinar had barricaded his force in the mountains outside the regional capital of El Fasher since abandoning it in May. Dinar's force of 2,000 men began to dwindle down to half as men deserted him.
- The Hawaiʻi Volcanoes National Park was established in Hawaii, the 11th National Park in the United States and the first in a Territory.
- The Royal Flying Corps established No. 59, No. 64 and No. 65 Squadrons.
- Robert Baden-Powell published The Wolf Cub's Handbook in the United Kingdom, establishing the basis of the junior section of the Scouting movement, the Wolf Cubs (modern-day Cub Scouts).
- The first edition of the Kentucky Thoroughbred Horse Association Bulletin news magazine was published for local horse breeders in Lexington, Kentucky. The magazine grew in popularity with horse breeders across the United States and was renamed The Blood-Horse in 1929.
- Born:
  - Fiorenzo Angelini, Italian clergy, Pontifical Council for the Pastoral Care of Health Care Workers from 1985 to 1996; in Rome, Kingdom of Italy (present-day Italy) (d. 2014)
  - Angela Calomiris, American photographer, secret FBI informant in the Communist Party USA from 1942 to 1949; in New York City, United States (d. 1995)
  - Anne Hébert, Canadian poet and novelist, author of Kamouraska, three-time recipient of the Governor General's Awards; in Sainte-Catherine-de-Fossambault, Quebec, Canada (d. 2000)
  - Bernard Ramm, American theologian, author of The Christian View of Science and Scripture which argued against the young earth theory; in Butte, Montana, United States (d. 1992)
  - Lois Roden, American religious leader, founded the Branch Davidians with husband Benjamin Roden; in Stone County, Montana, United States (d. 1986)

== August 2, 1916 (Wednesday) ==
- An on-board explosion sank the Italian battleship Leonardo da Vinci while anchored in Taranto harbor, killing 248 officers and crew.
- A Bristol Scout from the Royal Navy seaplane tender Vindex unsuccessfully attacked a German Zeppelin. It was the first interception of an airship by a carrier-based aircraft.
- German flying ace Erwin Böhme shot down and killed Latvian flying ace Eduard Pulpe after an hour-long battle.
- The Apotheosis of Democracy sculpture by Paul Wayland Bartlett on the east wing of the United States Capitol was unveiled to the public.
- Born: Georgette Seabrooke, American artist, best known for her mural Recreation in Harlem at the Harlem Hospital Center in New York City; in Charleston, South Carolina, United States (d. 2011)

== August 3, 1916 (Thursday) ==
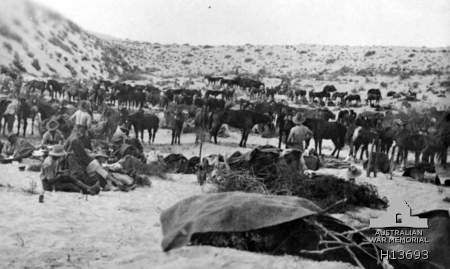
8th Australian Light Horse Regiment at Romani, Egypt.

- Battle of Romani – A joint Ottoman-German force of 16,000 under command of Friedrich Freiherr Kress von Kressenstein attacked the town of Romani, Egypt held by the Egyptian Expeditionary Force in an attempt to push the British out of the Sinai Peninsula and take control of the Suez Canal.
- Roger Casement was hanged at Pentonville Prison for high treason for his role in the Easter Rising.
- The musical comedy Chu Chin Chow, written, produced, directed and starring Oscar Asche, with music by Frederic Norton, premièred at His Majesty's Theatre in London. It will run for five years and a total of 2,238 performances (more than twice as many as any previous musical), a West End theatre record that would stand for nearly forty years.
- Born:
  - Claude Demetrius, American songwriter, known for his rockabilly song hits including "Mean Woman Blues" and "Hard Headed Woman", both sung by Elvis Presley; in Bath, Maine, United States (d. 1988)
  - Shakeel Badayuni, Indian poet and songwriter, composed song hits for Hindi films including Gharana and Sahib Bibi Aur Ghulam; in Budaun, United Provinces of Agra and Oudh, British India (present-day Uttar Pradesh, India) (d. 1970)
  - Gordon Merrick, American actor and writer, considered the pioneer of gay fiction including The Stumpet Wind; as William Gordon Merrick, in Bala Cynwyd, Pennsylvania, United States (d. 1988)
  - José Manuel Moreno, Argentine association football player, second striker for several clubs throughout South America including Club Atlético River Plate; as José Manuel Moreno Fernández, in Buenos Aires, Argentina (d. 1978)
- Died: Roger Casement, Irish nationalist and diplomat (b. 1864)

== August 4, 1916 (Friday) ==
- The Treaty of the Danish West Indies was signed to allow transfer of sovereignty of the Danish West Indies from Denmark to the United States, in exchange for a sum of US$25,000,000 in gold (US$ 739,680,000 in 2025).
- Battle of Pozières – After several delays due to German bombardment, the Australian 2nd Division was able to push forth and secure most of the second network of German trenches east of Pozières, France.
- Battle of Delville Wood – A British effort to take the eastern side of Delville Wood near Longueval, France, failed.
- Battle of Romani – British reinforcements launched a front attack on German-Ottoman forces at Wellington Ridge and a rearguard action at Katia that overturned the enemy's assault on the Sinai Peninsula.
- Died: Frédéric Janssoone, 77, French clergy, reintroduced the Order of Friars Minor in Canada, beatified by Pope John Paul II in 1988 (b. 1838)

== August 5, 1916 (Saturday) ==
- Battle of Pozières – The Australian 2nd Division was relieved by the Australian 4th Division. The 2nd division had sustained 6,848 casualties over a 12-day period.
- Battle of Romani – With the German-Ottoman attack on the Sinai Peninsula failing, General Friedrich Freiherr Kress von Kressenstein ordered his forces to retreat to Arish.
- Born: Sadeq Chubak, Iranian writer, author of the novel Tangsir; in Bushire, Iran (d. 1998)
- Died: George Butterworth, 31, English composer, known for his orchestral pieces including The Banks of Green Willow and Love Blows As the Wind Blows; killed in action at the Battle of the Somme (b. 1885)

== August 6, 1916 (Sunday) ==
- Sixth Battle of the Isonzo – The Italian army launched its sixth offensive against Austria-Hungary in northern Italy with the Battle of Doberdò, the bloodiest single battle on the Italian front. Some 20,000 soldiers from both sides were killed or missing before the Italians were able to push Austro-Hungarian forces out of the Doberdò del Lago commune.
- Battle of Pozières – German forces launched a counter-assault on the captured O.G. Lines while the Australian forces were rotating units.
- Battle of Romani – British forces continue to advance on the town of Oghratina as they pursued the retreating German-Ottoman force on the Sinai Peninsula.
- French flying ace Captain René Fonck gained his first confirmed victory, eventually becoming the highest-scoring Allied and second-highest-scoring ace overall of World War I.
- Born:
  - Hugo Biermann, South African naval officer, only naval officer to hold the position of Chief of South African Defence Force; in Johannesburg, South Africa (d. 2012)
  - Helmut Lipfert, German fighter pilot, member of the Luftwaffe during World War II, ranked 13th of the world's best fighter aces with over 200 victories, recipient of the Knight's Cross of the Iron Cross; in Lippelsdorf, Duchy of Saxe-Meiningen, German Empire (present-day Gräfenthal, Thuringia, Germany) (d. 1990)
  - E. Michael Burke, American sports executive, President of the New York Yankees from 1966 to 1973; as Edmund Michael Burke, in Enfield, Connecticut, United States (d. 1987)
  - Richard Hofstadter, American historian, recipient of the Pulitzer Prize for both The Age of Reform and Anti-intellectualism in American Life; in Buffalo, New York, United States (d. 1970)
  - Dom Mintoff, Maltese state leader, eighth Prime Minister of Malta from 1955 to 1958; as Dominic Mintoff, in Bormla, Crown Colony of Malta (present-day Malta) (d. 2012)
  - Richard Sharples, British politician, Governor of Bermuda from 1972 to 1973, assassinated by Bermudian Black Power group Black Beret Cadre; in Hamilton, Bermuda (assassinated, 1973)
- Died:
  - Duncan Chapman, 28, Australian army officer, first man to step ashore at the start of the Gallipoli campaign; killed in action at the Battle of the Somme (b. 1888)
  - Franz Eckert, 64, German composer, created the harmonies for the Japan national anthem "Kimigayo" and the Korean Empire anthem "Aegukga"; died of stomach cancer (b. 1852)
  - Enrico Toti, 33, Italian cyclist, noted for being able to race while only having one leg; killed in action at the Sixth Battle of the Isonzo (b. 1882)

== August 7, 1916 (Monday) ==
- Portugal joined the Allies.
- Battle of Pozières – German forces launched a final counterattack to recapture their lost trench network. As Germans overran the trench system and began to take prisoners, Australian officer Lieutenant Albert Jacka, a veteran of the Gallipoli campaign, led seven soldiers to resist in heavy hand-to-hand combat that repelled the attack, capturing 50 Germans in the process. He was subsequently award the Military Cross for his actions, although many eyewitnesses insisted he should have won a second Victoria Cross.
- Battle of Delville Wood – A renewed attacked yielded limited success, with new posts established beyond Delville Wood and north of the village of Longueuil, France.
- Battle of Romani – British forces occupied Oghratina on the Sinai Peninsula.
- The United States Army activated the 32nd Infantry Regiment in Oahu, Hawaii.
- A large audience attended the Bohemian Theatre in Dublin for the first screening of the Film Company of Ireland's first film O'Neill of the Glen.
- The Imperial Russian Air Service began flying Anatra aircraft, although it would not be used extensively until the Russian Civil War.
- Born:
  - Kermit Love, American puppeteer, designer of many of The Muppets on Sesame Street; in Spring Lake, New Jersey, United States (d. 2008)
  - Leslie George Bull, British bomber pilot, member of the "Great Escape" from Stalag Luft III during World War II; in Highbury, London, England (executed, 1944)
- Died: David McMurtrie Gregg, 83, American army officer, decorated cavalry officer for the Union during the Gettysburg campaign (b. 1833)

== August 8, 1916 (Tuesday) ==
- Battle of Kowel – Austria-Hungary successfully stalled the Brusilov Offensive, inflicting tens of thousands of casualties on the Russians.
- Sixth Battle of the Isonzo – Italy captured city of Gorizia and established a bridgehead along the Isonzo River, a symbolic victory that greatly boosted the morale of the Italian army.
- Battle of Romani – The New Zealand Mounted Rifles Brigade occupied Debabis on the Sinai Peninsula.
- German submarine SM UB-44 disappeared after departing from port for the Dardanelles although naval historians speculate she was sunk by a patrol boat.
- The Royal Flying Corps established the No. 62 Squadron.
- The one-act play Trifles by Susan Glaspell was first performed by the Provincetown Players at the Wharf Theatre in Provincetown, Massachusetts, with Glaspell playing one of the key roles. Loosely based on an actual murder case, the play is considered an early feminist drama and is often anthologized in many play collections.
- Died:
  - Kamimura Hikonojō, 67, Japanese naval officer, admiral of the Imperial Japanese Navy during the Russo-Japanese War (b. 1849)
  - Edgar Dewdney, 80, Canadian statesman, lieutenant governor of Northwest Territories and lieutenant governor of British Columbia (b. 1835)
  - Lily Braun, 51, German feminist writer, advocate for economic freedom and abolition of legal marriage for women in Germany; died of a stroke (b. 1865)
  - Torakusu Yamaha, 65, Japanese business executive, founder of the Yamaha Corporation (b. 1851)

== August 9, 1916 (Wednesday) ==
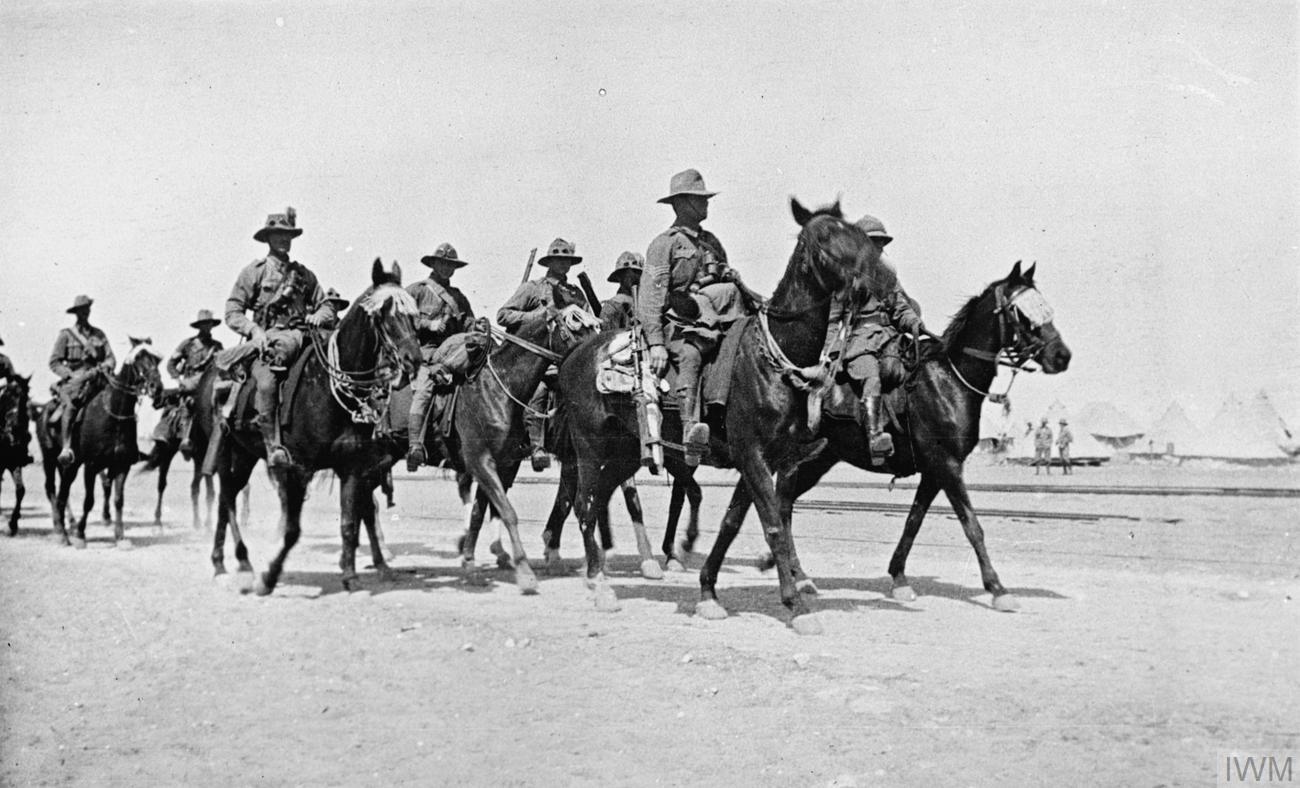
Australian light horse patrol in Egypt.

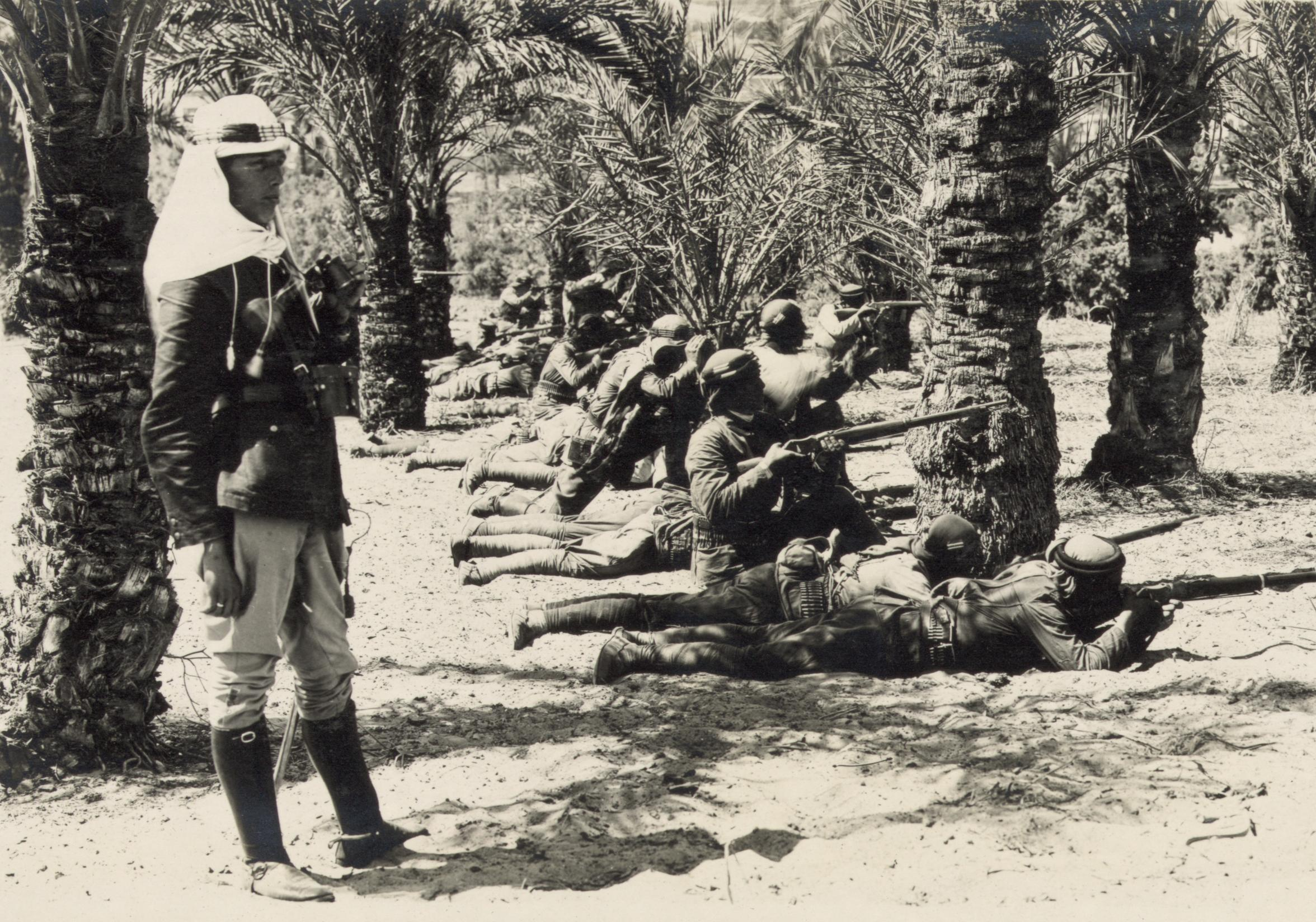
Turkish troops in the Sinai.

- Battle of Dorian – British and French forces attacked Bulgarian defense positions around Doiran Lake in Serbia.
- Battle of Bitlis – Russian and Armenian forces captured the Turkish provincial of Bitlis and the surrounding region in eastern Turkey.
- Battle of Bir el Abd – Ottoman forces repelled the ANZAC Mounted Division at Bir el Abd on the Sinai Peninsula that slowed the British pursuit of retreating German and Ottoman forces. The joint Australian-New Zealand unit lost 300 casualties.
- An Austro-Hungarian aircraft sank British submarine HMS B-10 in the Adriatic Sea, the first time aircraft succeeded in sinking such a vessel.
- Australian soldier Martin O'Meara began a heroic act of repeatedly going out and bringing in wounded officers and men from "no man's land" under intense artillery and machine gun fire during the Battle of Pozières.
- Lassen Volcanic National Park was established in California.
- Capulin Volcano National Monument was established in New Mexico.
- The crime drama Cheating Cheaters by Max Marcin — a melodrama about two groups of jewel thieves posing as wealthy families to rob the other — premiered on Broadway and would run for 286 performances.
- Born:
  - William E. Dyess, American air force officer, survivor and chief eyewitness to the Bataan Death March; as WILLIAM EDWIN Dyess, in Albany, Texas, United States (killed in plane crash, 1943)
  - Peter Wright, British intelligence officer, member of MI5 counter-intelligence unit, author of Spycatcher; in Chesterfield, England (d. 1995)
- Died: Alpheus Beede Stickney, 76, rail executive, first president of Chicago Great Western Railway (b. 1840)

== August 10, 1916 (Thursday) ==
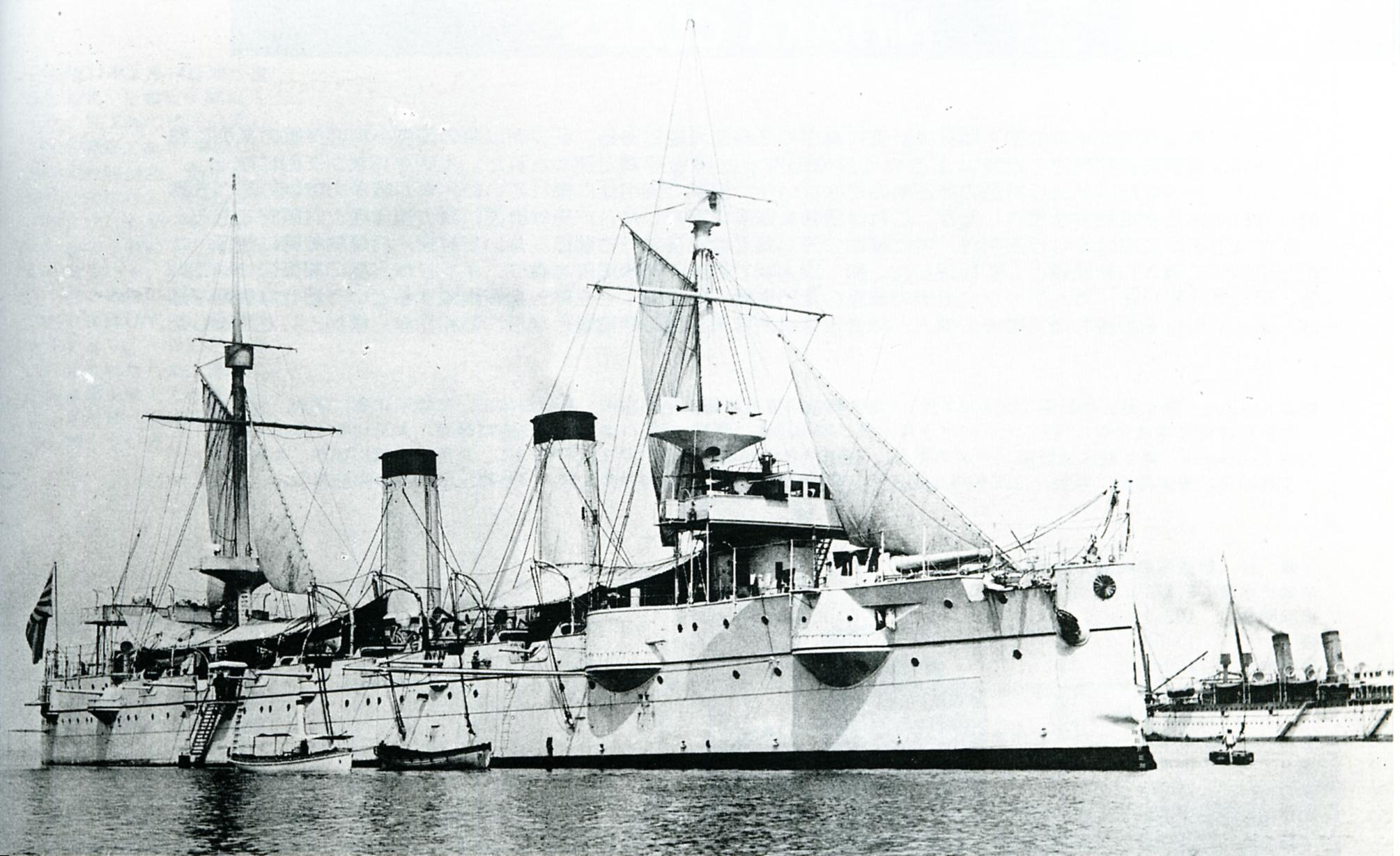
Japanese cruiser Kasagi

- Japanese cruiser Kasagi sank after running aground in the Tsugaru Strait.
- The German air squadrons Jagdstaffel 2 and 3 were established as the second and third dedicated fighting squadrons for the Imperial German Flying Corps.
- The official British documentary propaganda film The Battle of the Somme premièred in London. In the first six weeks of general release, 20 million people viewed it.
- Born: Hubert Maga, Beninese state leader, President of the Republic of Dahomey from 1960 to 1963; in Parakou, Dahomey (present-day Benin) (d. 2000)
- Died:
  - Addie L. Ballou, 79, American poet activist, leading advocate for women's suffrage, temperance and prison reform, author of poetry collections Driftwood and The Padre’s Dream and Other Poems (b. 1838)
  - Charles Dawson, 52, British amateur archaeologist, charged with fraud on several archaeological discoveries including the Piltdown Man (b. 1864)
  - John J. Loud, 71, American entrepreneur, designer of the ballpoint pen (b. 1844)

== August 11, 1916 (Friday) ==
- 1916 Texas hurricane — Sightings of a tropical storm were sighted from ships near Barbados.
- Attacks on High Wood – British forces were equipped with flamethrowers and explosive-laden pipes to flush German defenses out of a wood near Bazentin, France.
- The Muscatine & Iowa City Railway ceased operations following the company going into receivership the month before.
- The Rosecrance Memorial Home opened as boy orphanage in New Milford, Illinois. The organization has since expanded to provide treatment facilities for adolescents and adults.
- Born:
  - John Carpenter, American air force officer, bomber commander for Operation Matterhorn during World War II; as John Wilson Carpenter III, in Starkville, Mississippi, United States (d. 1996)
  - Leon Vance, American air force officer, recipient of the Medal of Honor for actions during D-Day, in Enid, Oklahoma (killed in action, 1944)
  - Gopal Gurunath Bewoor, Indian army officer, ninth Chief of the Army Staff for the Indian Army; in Seoni, Madhya Pradesh, British India (present-day India) (d. 1989)
  - Kaname Harada, Japanese fighter pilot, earned title flying ace for 19 aircraft shot down before he was himself shot down in 1942; in Kamiminochi District, Nagano, Empire of Japan (present-day Japan) (d. 2016)

== August 12, 1916 (Saturday) ==
- Battle of Romani – A planned attack on Bir el Abd was cancelled as supply and communications for the ANZAC forces were stretched to the limit on the Sinai Peninsula, ending the British pursuit of the remaining German-Ottoman forces to Arish. The action formally ended any further military action in the region and cemented the Allies' hold on the Suez Canal. In all, British casualties for the battle ranged from 1,200 to 1,300, while Ottoman-German casualties were estimated at 9,000.
- Sixth Battle of the Isonzo – Emergency reinforcements from Austria-Hungary slowed the Italian advance.
- For his actions of rescuing wounded comrades under enemy fire over three days, Australian soldier Martin O'Meara was awarded the Victoria Cross.
- Born: Ralph Nelson, American film maker, director of Lilies of the Field and Charly; in New York City, United States (d. 1987)
- Died: Mark Hovell, 28, British educator and military officer, author of The Chartist movement (b. 1888)

== August 13, 1916 (Sunday) ==
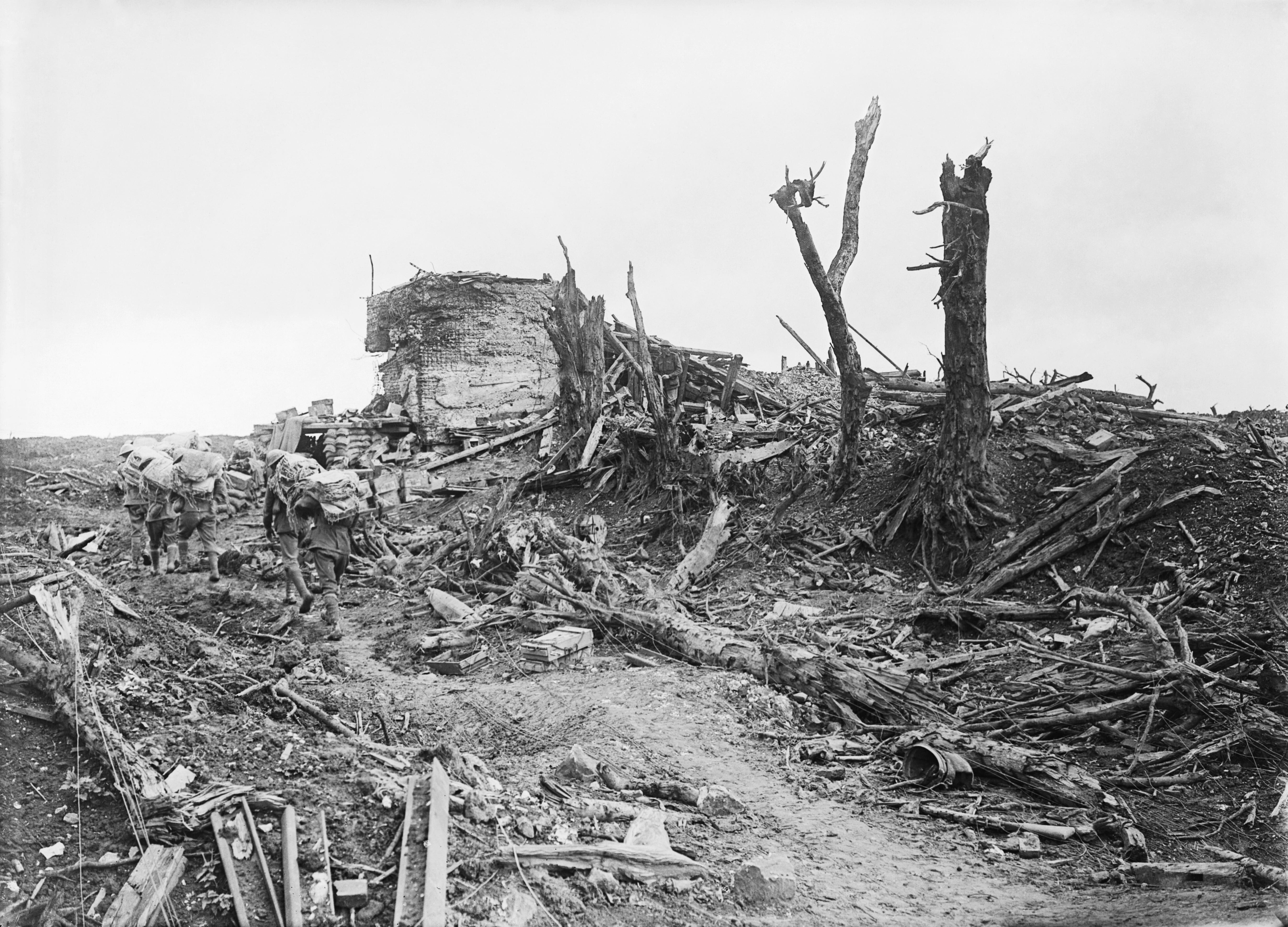
The "Gibraltar" bunker near Pozières, France, in late August. A fatigue party laden with sandbags heads for the fighting at Mouquet Farm.

- Battle of Pozières – Germany called off any further attacks to retake the village of Pozières, France, from Australian forces. In all, the Australians forces sustained around 23,000 casualties.
- Royal Navy destroyer HMS Lassoo was torpedoed and sunk by German U-boat SM UB-10 in the North Sea, with the loss of six of her 77 crew.
- 1916 Texas hurricane — The United States Weather Bureau issued a warning to shipping in the Caribbean after reports confirmed the tropical storm was strengthening.
- Born:
  - Vincent P. de Poix, American naval officer, first captain of the recommissioned USS Enterprise carrier in 1961 and commander of the United States Second Fleet during the Vietnam War; as Vincent Paul de Poix, in Los Angeles, United States (d. 2015)
  - Jim Roper, American race car driver, winner of the first NASCAR race; as Christian David Roper, in Halstead, Kansas, United States (d. 2000)
- Died:
  - Samuel McLaren, 39, Australian mathematician, developed mathematical concept on gravity that anticipated the theory of general relativity; killed in action at the Battle of the Somme (b. 1876)
  - George Turner, 65, Australian state leader, 18th Premier of Victoria and first Treasurer of Australia (b. 1851)

== August 14, 1916 (Monday) ==
- Born:
  - Ralph de Toledano, Moroccan-American journalist, editor of Newsweek and National Review; in Tangier, Morocco (d. 2007)
  - Frank and John Craighead (twins), American conservationists, best known for protecting grizzly bears living within the National Park Service system; in Washington D.C., United States (d. 2001 and 2016)
  - Fumio Fujimura, Japanese baseball player, pitcher for the Osaka Tigers from 1936 to 1958; in Kure, Hiroshima, Empire of Japan (present-day Japan) (d. 1992)
  - Wellington Mara, American sports executive, co-owner of the New York Giants football team, son of Giants founder Tim Mara; in Rochester, New York, United States (d. 2005)
  - Heinrich Prinz zu Sayn-Wittgenstein, Danish-born German fighter pilot, night fighter ace for the Luftwaffe during World War II, recipient of the Knight's Cross of the Iron Cross; in Copenhagen, Denmark (killed in action, 1944)
- Died: Charlie Pritchard, 33, Welsh rugby player, back row for the Newport and Monmouthshire rugby clubs from 1901 to 1911, and the Wales national rugby union team from 1904 to 1910; killed in action at Loos, France (b. 1882)

== August 15, 1916 (Tuesday) ==
- 1916 Texas hurricane — The tropical storm intensified into a hurricane while south of Hispaniola and made landfall at Kingston, Jamaica, killing two people and causing extensive damage in the capital city as well as to banana plantations in the surrounding area.
- British submarines HMS E4 and HMS E41 collided into one another in the North Sea, killed a total 47 crew from both vessels while another 15 survived.
- Royal Navy battle cruiser HMS Furious was launched by Armstrong Whitworth in Newcastle upon Tyne, England, and would serve in both world wars before being scrapped in 1948.
- U.S. Navy destroyer USS Davis was launched by Bath Iron Works in Bath, Maine by sponsor Miss E. Davis, granddaughter of Rear Admiral Charles Henry Davis after whom the naval vessel was named. The destroyer served in World War I and the United States Coast Guard before it was scrapped in 1934.
- The association football club Atlas was established in Guadalajara, Mexico.
- Born:
  - Derek Freeman, New Zealand anthropologist, famously critiqued Margaret Mead and her research on Samoan society; as John Derek Freeman, in Wellington, New Zealand (d. 2001)
  - Joseph Raya, Lebanese clergy, Archbishop of Haifa for the Melkite Greek Catholic Church from 1968 to 1974, prominent promoter of civil rights and religious reconciliation; in Zahlé, Lebanon (d. 2005)

== August 16, 1916 (Wednesday) ==
- 1916 Texas hurricane — An official hurricane warning was issued for western Cuba and the Yucatán Peninsula. Local weather warnings were issues for Cameron and Calhoun counties in Texas, where over 100 vehicles were used to transport residents to storm shelters.
- The Migratory Bird Treaty between Canada and the United States was signed.
- Born: Bertha Merrill Holt, American politician, member of the North Carolina House of Representatives from 1975 to 1993; in Eufaula, Alabama, United States (d. 2010)
- Died: Stephen Newton, 63, English cricketer, batsman for the Somerset County Cricket Club and Marylebone Cricket Club from 1876 to 1890 (b. 1853)

== August 17, 1916 (Thursday) ==
- The Treaty of Bucharest was signed secretly between Romania and the Allies.
- Sixth Battle of the Isonzo – Italian General Luigi Cadorna called off the offensive after advancing five kilometers into Austro-Hungarian territory. The Italians sustained 51,000 casualties while Austro-Hungarian forces had 40,000.
- Battle of Florina – The Bulgarian First Army of 116,000 men under command of Kliment Boyadzhiev captured the cities of Lerin and Banitsa in Macedonia (now part of Greece) in an opening offensive against Serbian forces under command of Pavle Jurišić Šturm.
- British poet F. W. Harvey was captured by the Germans and spent the rest of the war circulated between seven prisoner of war camps. Much of it would be spent in solitary confinement which allowed Harvey time to write a wealth of poetry and memoirs that were published in the post-war period.
- Born:
  - Dudley E. Faver, American air force officer, director for the Secretary of the Air Force Personnel Council from 1966 to 1973; as Dudley Ervin Faver, in Sweetwater, Texas, United States (d. 2011)
  - Clint Grant, American photographer, photojournalist for The Dallas Morning News from 1949 to 1986; as Donald Clinton Grant, in Nashville, Tennessee, United States (d. 2010)
- Died: Umberto Boccioni, 33, Italian painter and sculptor, member of the Futurism movement, known for such works as The City Rises and Dynamism of a Cyclist; fatally injured after being trampled by his horse (b. 1882)

== August 18, 1916 (Friday) ==
Storm damage in Corpus Christi

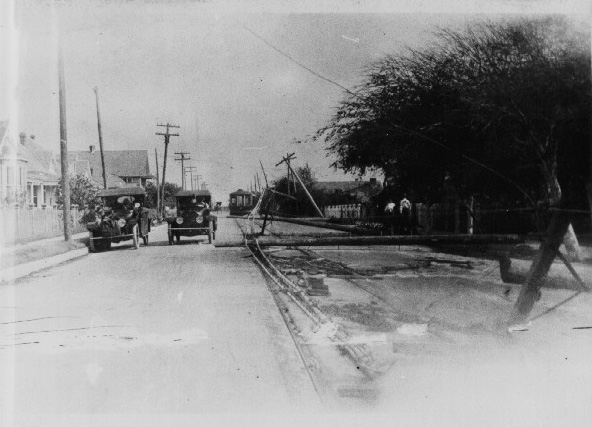
Much of Corpus Christi was affected by power outages.

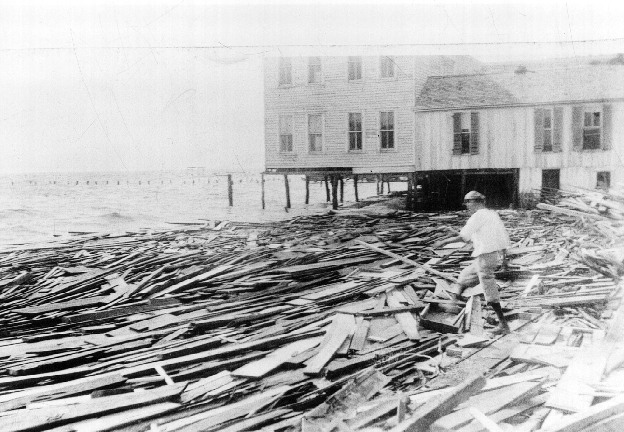
The waterfront was the city's hardest-hit area.

- Battle of Dorian – Bulgarian forces repulsed Allied assaults on Doiran Lake in Serbia, inflicting 3,200 casualties on French and British units.
- Bulgarian forces with support from Austria-Hungary occupied Korçë, Albania.
- Battle of Verdun – French forces recaptured the commune of Fleury-devant-Douaumont, France, from the Germans.
- Battle of Delville Wood – The British launched further attacks on Delville Wood with mixed results.
- Attacks on High Wood – British forces failed to take the woods near Bazentin, France, with a loss 104 men.
- 1916 Texas hurricane — The hurricane made landfall at Baffin Bay, Texas, with maximum wind speeds at 135 mph (215 km/h) and bringing an estimated 1.58 inches (25.4 mm) of rain. The storm left $1.6 million (1916 USD) in damages in Texas and 24 people dead in total.
- The Second Army of Romania was established.
- Born:
  - Don Keefer, best known for his supporting roles in Gunsmoke and Angel, founding member of the Actors Studio; as Donald Hood Keefer, in Highspire, Pennsylvania, United States (d. 2014)
  - Moura Lympany, English pianist, best known for her live and TV performances including The Ed Sullivan Show; as Mary Gertrude Johnstone, in Saltash, Cornwall, England (d. 2005)
  - Neagu Djuvara, Romanian historian, member of Radio Free Europe and associate professor of the University of Bucharest; in Bucharest, Kingdom of Romania (present-day Romania) (d. 2018)

== August 19, 1916 (Saturday) ==
- The British and German navies clashed in the North Sea in an attempt to regain sea advantage after the losses at the Battle of Jutland in June. A total of 18 German battleships, supported by submarines and Zeppelins, fought 29 Royal Navy battleships and supporting naval vessels. German submarines sank British light cruisers HMS Nottingham and HMS Falmouth while a British sub damaged German battleship SMS Westfalen. Despite the loss of ships, casualties were light as crews had time to abandon ship and reach new vessels.
- The Irish Times in Dublin issued a 264-page handbook detailing the events of the Easter Rising with a second edition published at the end of the year.
- Born: Ramon Bagatsing, Filipino politician, longest-serving Mayor of Manila from 1972 to 1986; in Fabrica, Sagay, Philippine Islands (present-day Philippines) (d. 2006)

== August 20, 1916 (Sunday) ==
- Attacks on High Wood — A British battalion captured a single German trench on the western edge of the wood.
- 1916 Texas hurricane — The storm weakened to a summer storm over McCamey, Texas.
- The association football club Ñublense was established in Chillán, Chile as a high school boys sports club that include football, basketball and boxing.
- Born: George Rosenkranz, Hungarian-Mexican chemist, leading researcher in steroid chemistry; as György Rosenkranz, in Budapest, Austria-Hungary (present-day Hungary) (d. 2019)
- Died: Jim Leytham, 36, English rugby player, winger for the England national rugby league team from 1905 to 1910 and the Great Britain national rugby league team from 1908 to 1910, and the Wigan Warriors from 1903 to 1912; died in a fishing accident (b. 1879)

== August 21, 1916 (Monday) ==
- Peru declared neutrality during World War I.
- Battle of Delville Wood – The Germans inflicted nearly 200 casualties on a British direct assault in the wood, but a midnight attack allowed them to capture the road to Flers, France, along with over 200 German prisoners and a dozen machine guns.
- German submarine SM UC-10 was torpedoed and sunk by British submarine HMS E54 with the loss of all 18 of her crew.
- Born:
  - Murry Dickson, American baseball player, pitcher for the St. Louis Cardinals, Kansas City Athletics, Pittsburgh Pirates, Philadelphia Phillies and New York Yankees from 1939 to 1959; in Tracy, Missouri, United States (d. 1989)
  - Robert M. Gagné, American psychologist, best known for developing the education theory in his book Conditions of Learning; in North Andover, Massachusetts, United States (d. 2002)
  - Geoffrey Keen, English actor, best known for his role of British Defense Minister Frederick Gray in the James Bond films; in Wallingford, Oxfordshire, England (d. 2005)
  - Michael Packe, English historian and cricketer, author of The Life of John Stuart Mill, batsman for Leicestershire County Cricket Club from 1936 to 1939; in Eastbourne, England (d. 1978)

== August 22, 1916 (Tuesday) ==
- Battle of Delville Wood – The British captured the north end of a key front line German trench but wet weather prevented further attacks for about a week.
- British submarine HMS E16 struck a mine and sunk with all 30 crew in the Heligoland Bight.
- The German air squadron Jagdstaffel 1 was established as the third dedicated fighting squadron for the Imperial German Flying Corps (despite having first top numerical order), with fighter pilot Kurt Wintgens as its first war ace.
- Born: Finis Alonzo Crutchfield Jr., American clergy, bishop of the United Methodist Church; in Henrietta, Texas, United States (d. 1987)

== August 23, 1916 (Wednesday) ==
- The Brazilian Navy established a naval aviation arm starting with a naval aviation school.
- Born:
  - Willie Davies, Welsh rugby player, back row for the Bradford Bulls from 1939 to 1950 and for the Great Britain and Wales national rugby league team; as William Thomas Harcourt Davies, in Penclawdd, Wales (d. 2002)
  - Oscar Ratnoff, American physician, leading researcher in blood coagulation and blood disorders; in New York City, United States (d. 2008)
- Died:
  - Serafín Avendaño, 77, Spanish painter, best known for his landscape paintings of Galicia, Spain; died of atherosclerosis (b. 1838)
  - Harold Cressy, 27, South African educator, first black South African to hold a degree and practice education in South Africa; died of pneumonia (b. 1889)

== August 24, 1916 (Thursday) ==
- Battle of Mlali – British colonial forces under General Jan Smuts attempted to draw out the opposing German side to fight their superior numbers near Mlali in what is now Tanzania, but failed in their attempts. As no ground was yielded, the British considered the battle a victory. During the fighting, cavalry officer Captain William Bloomfield was awarded a Victoria Cross for rescuing a wounded comrade at considerable risk for his own safety.
- Attacks on High Wood — Three British battalions attacked German machine defenses in the wood.
- The U.S. government established the Council of National Defense.
- Thirteen German naval airships under command by Peter Strasser attacked England. British antiaircraft fire damaged several airships and most of their bombs miss their targets widely, but L 31 under command of Heinrich Mathy bombed southeast London, inflicting £130,000 in damage, including damage to a power station at Deptford, and killing nine and injuring 40 civilians.
- British armed steamer Duke of Albany was torpedoed and sunk in the North Sea by German U-boat SM UB-27 with the loss of 24 crew.
- Imperial Trans-Antarctic Expedition – A final attempt was made to rescue the main body of the stranded British polar expedition party on Elephant Island following the sinking of the polar ship Endurance, with expedition leader Ernest Shackleton persuading the government of Chile to charter the cargo ship Yelcho for the rescue mission under the command of Luis Pardo.
- After a bankruptcy, the St. Louis and San Francisco Railroad was reorganized as the St. Louis–San Francisco Railway (often called the "Frisco").
- Born:
  - Hal Smith, American actor, best known for the role of Otis Campbell in The Andy Griffith Show; as Harold John Smith, in Petoskey, Michigan, United States (d. 1994)
  - Léo Ferré, French-Monégasque singer and composer, known for recorded work including Il n'y a plus rien, Verlaine et Rimbaud and Amour Anarchie; in Monaco (d. 1993)
- Died: Thomas W. O'Brien, 57, Canadian gold rush entrepreneur, founder of the Klondike Mines Railway and Klondike Brewery in the Yukon (b. 1859)

== August 25, 1916 (Friday) ==
- U.S. President Woodrow Wilson signed legislation creating the National Park Service.
- The German air squadrons Jagdstaffel 4 and 6 were established in the Imperial German Flying Corps, and would become two of its top squadrons in terms of air battle successes for World War I.
- Born:
  - Van Johnson, American film actor, best known for roles in Thirty Seconds Over Tokyo, A Guy Named Joe and The Human Comedy; as Charles Van Dell Johnson, in Newport, Rhode Island, United States (d. 2008)
  - Frederick Chapman Robbins, American pediatrician and virologist, recipient of the Nobel Prize in Physiology or Medicine for research into the polio vaccine; in Auburn, Alabama, United States (d. 2003)
  - Saburō Sakai, Japanese air force officer, fighter ace with 28 confirmed kills during World War II, author of Samurai!, an account of his war time experiences; in Saga Prefecture, Empire of Japan (present-day Japan) (d. 2000)
  - Ludwig Geißel, German philanthropist, co-founder of the Bread for the World program; in Alzey, Grand Duchy of Hesse, German Empire (present-day Rhineland-Palatinate, Germany) (d. 2000)
- Died:
  - Maurice O'Rorke, 86, Irish-New Zealand politician, fifth Speaker of the New Zealand House of Representatives from 1879 to 1902 (b. 1830)
  - Mary Tappan Wright, 64, American writer, known for short story collection A Truce, and Other Stories (b. 1851)

== August 26, 1916 (Saturday) ==
- Battle of Delville Wood – After a week delay due to rain, the British attacked and captured the rest of the front line German trench held since August 21.
- Born: Virginia Hill, American gangster, member of the Chicago Outfit, lover to Bugsy Siegel; as Onie Virginia Hill, in Lipscomb, Alabama, United States (d. 1966)

== August 27, 1916 (Sunday) ==
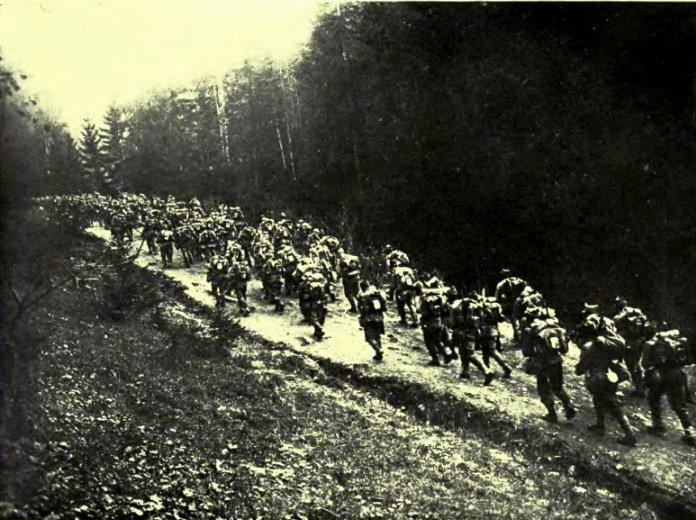
Romanian troops in Transylvania, 1916

- Romania declared war on the Central Powers, entering the war on the side of the Allies.
- Battle of Transylvania – A Romanian army of 440,000 men crossed the undefended Carpathian Mountains at midnight and advanced on Covasna, Transylvania, which was then part of Austria-Hungary.
- Romanian Campaign – Romanian river torpedo boats attacked the port of Ruse, Bulgaria.
- Attacks on High Wood — British relief forces launched a night attack on German defenses.
- German flying ace Oswald Boelcke created the first German special fighter squadron, Jagdstaffel 2.
- Born:
  - Halet Çambel, German-born Turkish athlete and archaeologist, first Muslim woman to compete in the Olympic Games, leading researcher into the ancient Hittite city of Karatepe; in Berlin, German Empire (present-day Germany) (d. 2014)
  - Martha Raye, American actress, known for her film and TV roles including The Martha Raye Show from 1954 to 1956; as Margy Reed, in Butte, Montana, United States (d. 1994)
  - James Ramsay, Australian politician, 20th Governor of Queensland from 1977 to 1985; in Hobart, Tasmania, Australia (d. 1986)
  - Jack Smith, American journalist, best known for his daily column for the Los Angeles Times over 37 years; in Long Beach, California, United States (d. 1996)
  - George Montgomery, American actor, best known for his westerns including The Pathfinder; as George Montgomery Letz, in Pondera County, Montana, United States (d. 2000)
- Died: Petar Kočić, 39, Bosnian writer and politician, leading advocate for Serbian independence from Austria-Hungary (b. 1877)

== August 28, 1916 (Monday) ==
- Germany declared war on Romania.
- Italy declared war on Germany.
- A magnitude 7.2 earthquake struck Changhua County, Taiwan. Reports varied with deaths ranging from 16 to 180 people, with 614 homes destroyed.
- Battle of Florina – The Bulgarian First Army halted their advance into Macedonia between Lake Vegoritida and the Voras Mountains due to increasingly difficult Serbian resistance. Bulgaria took 5,478 casualties while Serbia had 3,918.
- Battle of Transylvania – Romanian forces captured the town of Vama Buzăului, Transylvania, inflicting 132 enemy casualties and taking another 492 prisoner.
- Battle of Delville Wood – British efforts to capitalize on success with capturing the front line German trench were slowed by hardened enemy defenses.
- A military flying school known as Ham Common was established, eventually becoming Richmond, the oldest and largest airbase for the Royal Australian Air Force.
- Aircraft designer Frank Barnwell was awarded a contract to produce 50 Bristol fighter planes that could handle the new Rolls-Royce Falcon aircraft engine.
- Ball players Heinie Zimmerman and Mickey Doolan were traded by the Chicago Cubs to the New York Giants for Larry Doyle, Merwin Jacobson, and Herb Hunter.
- The first English Amateur Championship in snooker was held in Soho Square, London.
- Born:
  - Jack Vance, American writer, best known for his science fiction stores including The Dying Earth series; as John Holbrook Vance, in San Francisco, United States (d. 2013)
  - Frederick Knott, English playwright, best known for the stage thrillers Dial M for Murder and Wait Until Dark; in Hankou, Republic of China (present-day China) (d. 2002)
  - C. Wright Mills, American sociologist, author of The Power Elite and White Collar: The American Middle Classes; as Charles Wright Mills, in Waco, Texas, United States (d. 1962)

== August 29, 1916 (Tuesday) ==
- Battle of Transylvania – The Romanian Army captured the city of Brașov, Transylvania.
- U.S. President Woodrow Wilson signed the Jones Law which would act as the constitution of the Philippines until 1934.
- U.S. Navy cruiser USS Memphis was wrecked in Santo Domingo harbor during heavy weather, killing 43 crew and injuring another 204. Ship's officers and crew George William Rud, Claud Ashton Jones, and Charles H. Willey made heroic efforts to save the ship from complete damage, and would subsequently be awarded the Medal of Honor.
- Paul von Hindenburg replaced Erich von Falkenhayn as German Chief of Staff. General Erich Ludendorff now commanded German forces at Verdun, France.

== August 30, 1916 (Wednesday) ==
- The Ottoman Empire declared war on Romania.
- Imperial Trans-Antarctic Expedition – The Chilean vessel Yelcho reached Elephant Island in Weddell Sea and rescued the remaining 22 men of the expedition. Had the rescue not come, appointed interim expedition leader Frank Wild had planned to use one of the two remaining lifeboats to reach Deception Island to find rescue.
- German fighter ace Oswald Boelcke was given command of German air squadron Jagdstaffel 2 and allowed to pick his own pilots.
- Born:
  - Shag Crawford, American baseball umpire, officiated with the National League from 1956 to 1975; as Henry Charles Crawford, in Philadelphia, United States (d. 2007)
  - Johnny Lindell, American baseball player, played outfield and pitcher for the New York Yankees, St. Louis Cardinals, Philadelphia Phillies, and Pittsburgh Pirates from 1941 to 1954; as John Harlan Lindell, in Greeley, Colorado, United States (d. 1985)

== August 31, 1916 (Thursday) ==
- Battle of the Somme — The Germans launched the largest counterattack of the battle against the British at Delville Wood and High Wood in France.
- Battle of Transylvania – The Romanian Army captured several more villages in Transylvania and set themselves up completing the first objective of the offensive.
- The Royal Flying Corps established the No. 63 Squadron.
- The art gallery Kestnergesellschaft was founded in Hanover, Germany.
- The Danish news tabloid BT began publication in Copenhagen.
- Surabaya Zoo was established by decree of the Governor General of the Dutch East Indies in Surabaya, East Java (now Indonesia).
- Born:
  - Daniel Schorr, American journalist, best known for his work with CBC News and NPR, winner of three Emmy Awards for television journalism; in New York City, United States (d. 2010)
  - Robert Hanbury Brown, British astronomer, designer of the Narrabri Stellar Intensity Interferometer used to measure the size of stars; in Aruvankadu, British India (present-day India) (d. 2002)
