= Faver =

Faver may refer to:

- Faver (Altavalle), frazione of the comune of Altavalle in Trentino in the northern Italian region Trentino-Alto Adige/Südtirol,
- Faver (surname), surname

== See also ==
- Favor (disambiguation)
