= Battle of Mlali =

- Part of East African Campaign
Date	24 August 1916
Location	Mlali, German East Africa 6°58′S 37°33′E
Result	British victory

Belligerents
German Empire: German East Africa	British Empire

Commanders and leaders
(German Empire) Paul von Lettow-Vorbeck	(United Kingdom of Great Britain and Ireland) General Jan Smuts

Strength
Unknown	3 divisions
- Location within Tanzania Battle of Mlali (Africa)

The Battle of Mlali was fought during the East African Campaign of World War I. In mid-August 1916, the British, led by General Jan Christiaan Smuts, advanced three divisions from Kenya south into the Imperial German colony of Tanganyika to seize and disrupt their vital railway. Informed of the British movement by his scouts, the German commander Paul von Lettow-Vorbeck sent Captain Otto to investigate.

Outnumbered, the Germans were forced to withdraw. Despite several skirmishes, the British never succeeded in drawing out the main body of the German force to face their superior numbers. However, the Germans lost several important supply locations when they were captured by the British.

The British objective was primarily to destroy German troops, which they failed to achieve. Despite this, the battle was considered a victory by the British High Command, since the Germans were forced into retreat.

Captain William Bloomfield of the 2nd South African Mounted Brigade received the Victoria Cross for rescuing a wounded corporal during the battle at great personal risk.

== Sources ==
"Captain W.A. Bloomfield, VC" The Soldier's Burden. http://www.kaiserscross.com/188001/295022.html
