= Faver (surname) =

Faver is a surname of English origin. Notable people with the surname include:

- Colin Faver (1951–2015), British club and radio DJ
- Dudley E. Faver (1916–2011), United States Air Force general
- Héctor Fáver (born 1960), Argentine film producer and director
- Laura Faver Dias, American politician in Illinois
- Milton Faver (c. 1822–1889), American cattle rancher

== See also ==
- Haver
