= Bazentin =

- Commune
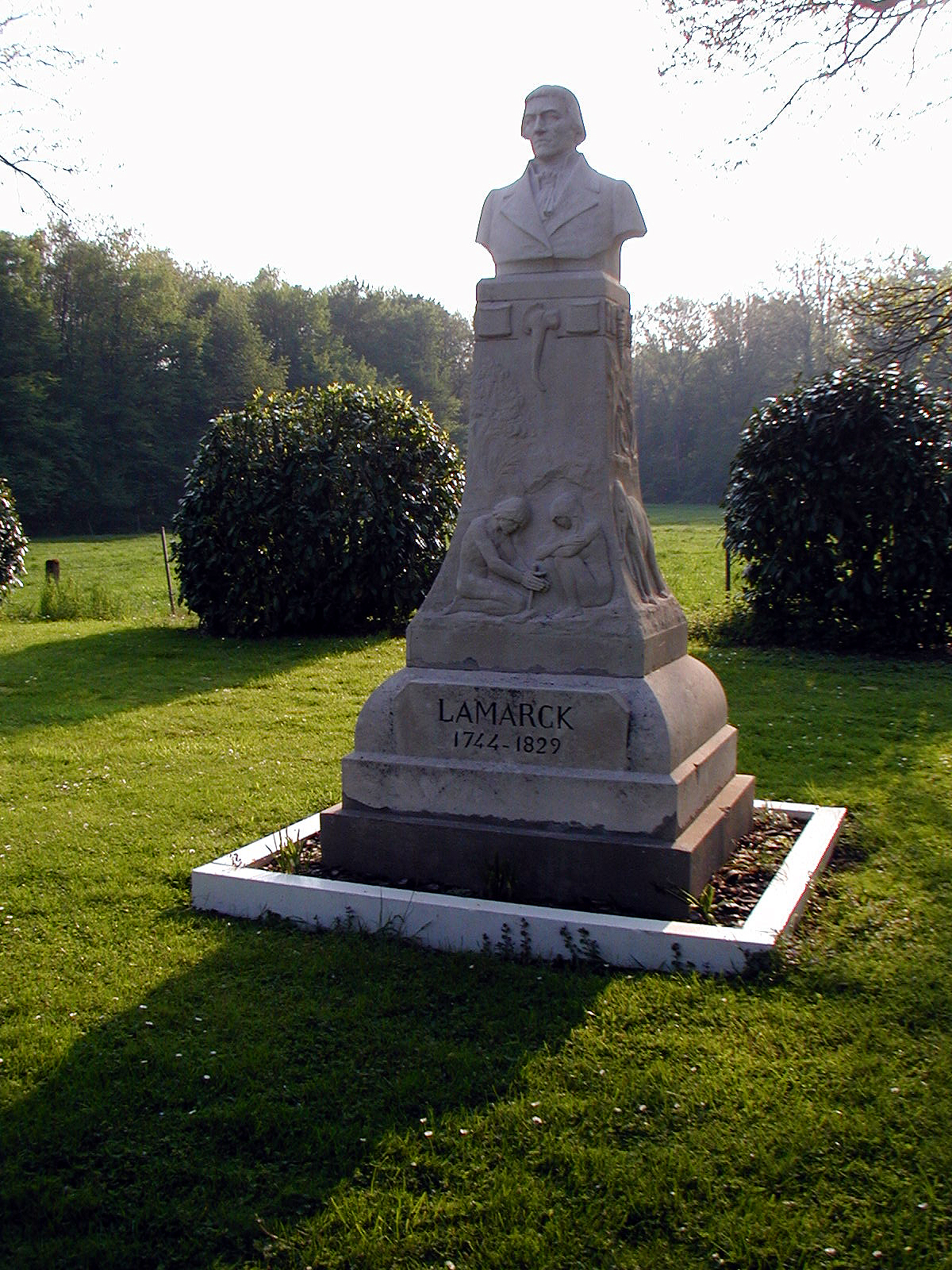
- Lamarck's memorial

- Coat of arms
- Location of Bazentin
- Location within France Location within Hauts-de-France
- Coordinates: 50°01′52″N 2°45′50″E
- Country: France
- Region: Hauts-de-France
- Department: Somme
- Arrondissement: Péronne
- Canton: Albert
- Intercommunality: CC du Pays du Coquelicot

Government
  - Mayor (2020–2026): Jean-Luc Fourdinier
- Area^{1}: 5.1 km^{2} (2.0 sq mi)
- Elevation: 90 m (300 ft)
- Highest elevation: 159 m (522 ft)
- Lowest elevation: 94 m (308 ft)
- Population (2023): 79
  - Density: 15/km^{2} (40/sq mi)
- Time zone: UTC+01:00 (CET)
  - Summer (DST): UTC+02:00 (CEST)
- INSEE/Postal code: 80059 /80300
- ^{1} French Land Register data, which excludes lakes, ponds, glaciers > 1 km^{2} (0.386 sq mi or 247 acres) and river estuaries.

Bazentin (French pronunciation: [bazɑ̃tɛ̃]) is a commune in the Somme department in Hauts-de-France in northern France.

== Geography ==
Situated between Amiens to the southwest and Arras to the north, on the D73 road.

== Population ==
Historical population
| Year | Pop. | ±% p.a. |
|---|---|---|
| 1968 | 114 | — |
| 1975 | 82 | −4.60% |
| 1982 | 74 | −1.46% |
| 1990 | 70 | −0.69% |
| 1999 | 77 | +1.06% |
| 2007 | 71 | −1.01% |
| 2012 | 77 | +1.64% |
| 2017 | 79 | +0.51% |
| 2023 | 79 | +0.00% |
Source: INSEE

== History ==
- 1914–1918: The village, in the middle of the war zone, was completely destroyed.

== Places and monuments ==
- Memorial to the naturalist Jean-Baptiste Lamarck
- Bazentin-le-Petit Military Cemetery
- Bazentin-le-Petit Communal Cemetery Extension

== People ==
- Birthplace of Jean-Baptiste Lamarck, 1 August 1744

== Gallery ==
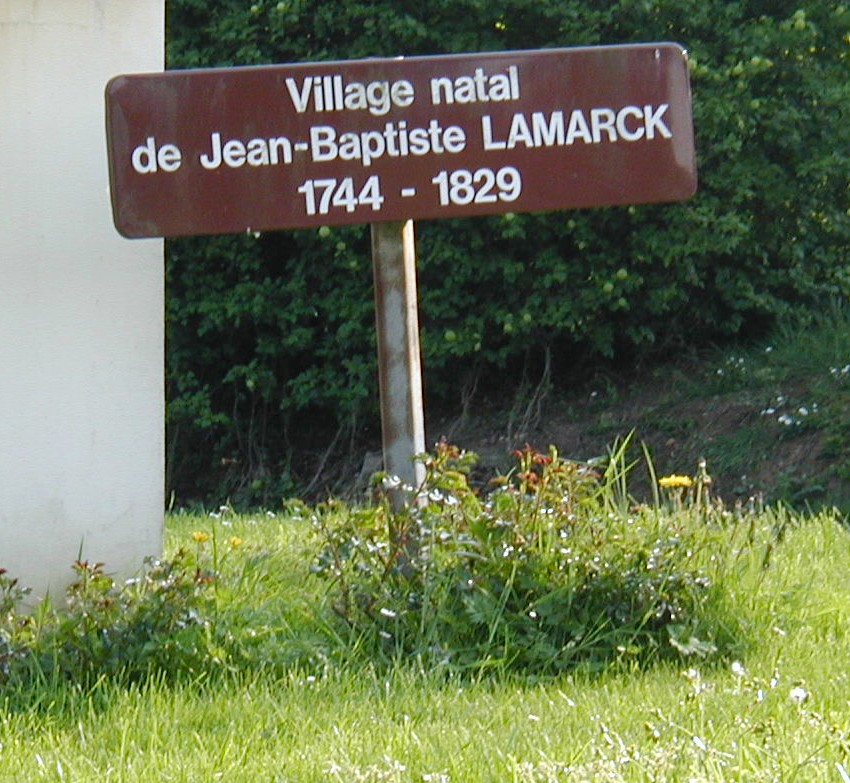
Plaque denoting Lamarck's birthplace

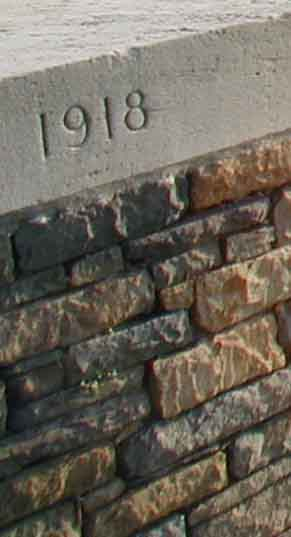
Cemetery entrance

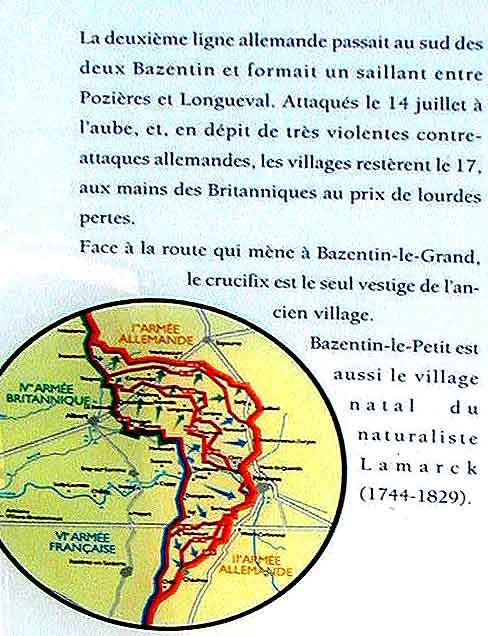
Information board in the village

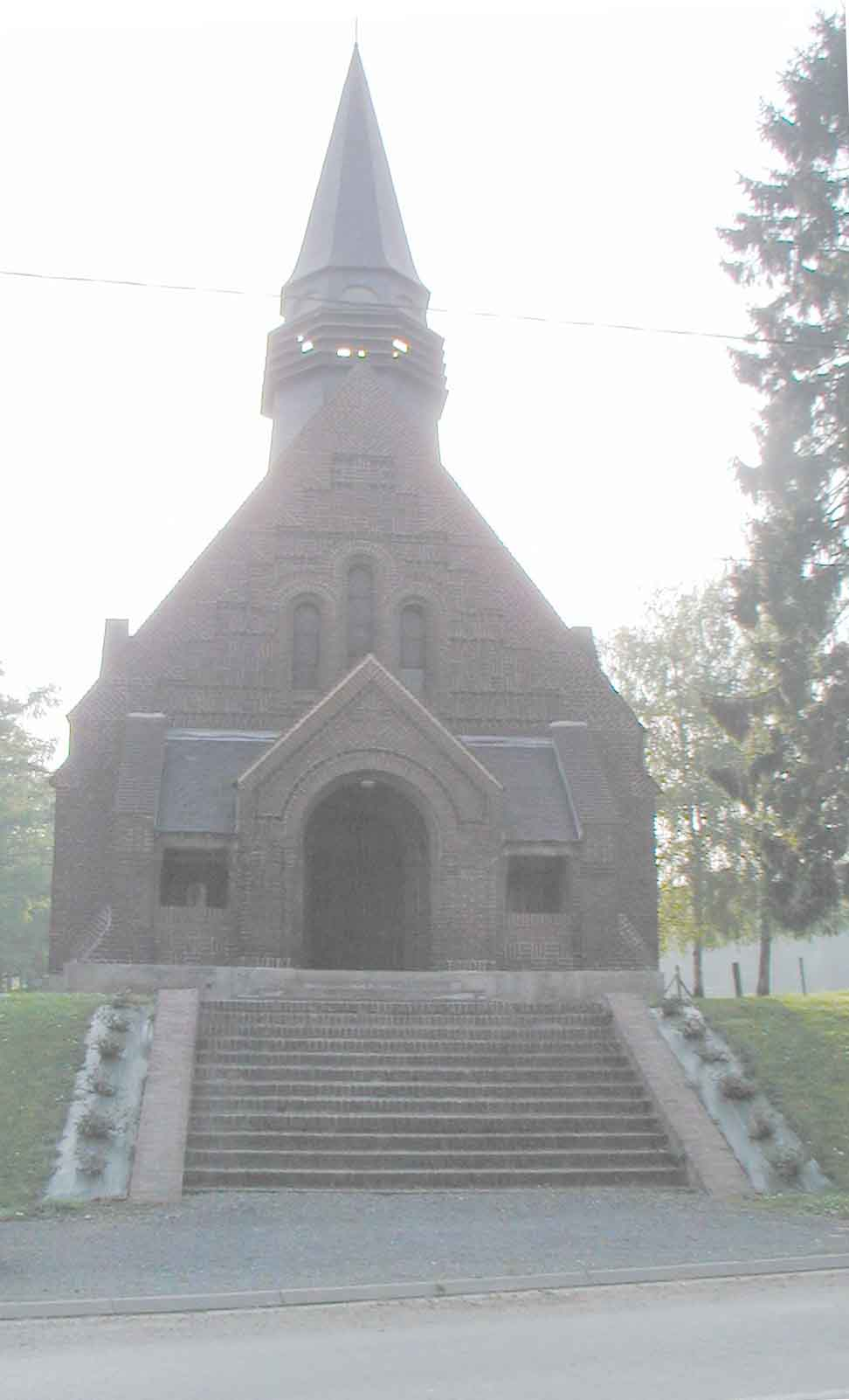
The church

== See also ==
- Communes of the Somme department
- Battle of Bazentin Ridge
