= William Bloomfield (VC) =

William Anderson Bloomfield VC
- Born: 30 January 1873; Edinburgh, Scotland, UK
- Died: 12 May 1954 (aged 81); Ermelo, Mpumalanga, South Africa
- Burial place: Ermelo Cemetery
- Military career
- Allegiance: Union of South Africa
- Branch: South African Forces
- Rank: Major
- Conflicts: World War I: East African Campaign; Battle of Mlali
- Awards: Victoria Cross

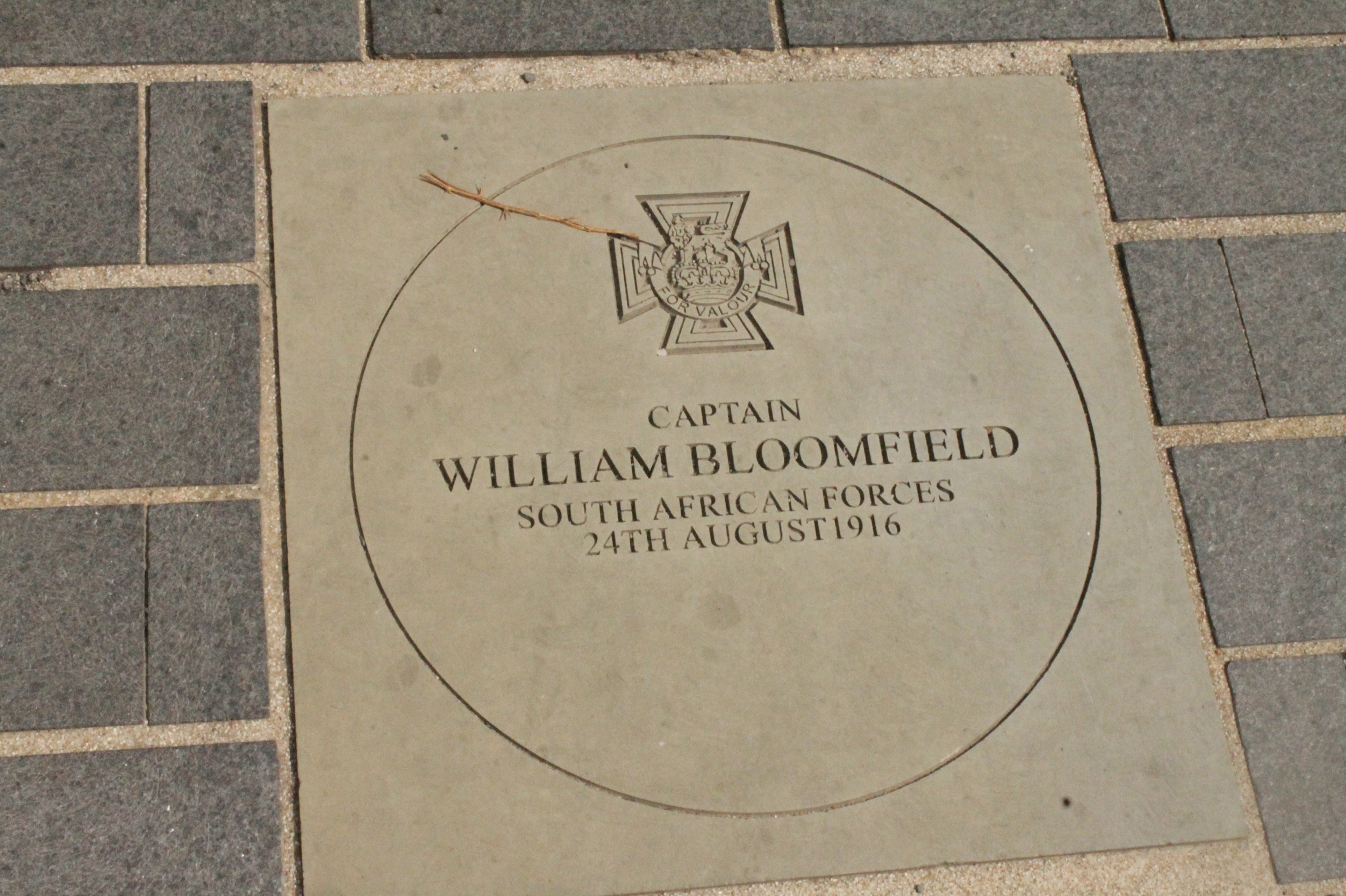
Pavement plaque to William Bloomfield VC, Union Canal, Edinburgh

Major William Anderson Bloomfield VC (30 January 1873 – 12 May 1954) was a British-born South African recipient of the Victoria Cross, the highest and most prestigious award for gallantry in the face of the enemy that can be awarded to British and Commonwealth forces.

He was born in Edinburgh, Scotland, UK. His parents emigrated to South Africa in 1878.

== Freemasonry ==
He was Initiated into Freemasonry in Concordia Lodge, No. 2685, (E.C.) (Ermelo, Mpumalanga Province, Republic of South Africa) on 18 June, Passed on 16 July and Raised on 16 July 1904.

== Victoria Cross ==
He was 43 years old, and a captain in the Scout Corps, 2nd South African Mounted Brigade, South African Forces during the First World War when the following deed took place for which he was awarded the VC.

On 24 August 1916 at Mlali, Tanganyika (now Tanzania), when consolidating his new position after being heavily attacked and being forced to retire, Captain Bloomfield found that one of the wounded – a corporal – had not been evacuated with the rest. At considerable personal risk the captain went back over 400 yards of ground swept by machine-gun and rifle fire and managed to reach the wounded man and bring him back to safety.

Whilst he was Scottish-born, he is also considered a South African as he emigrated there. Bloomfield later achieved the rank of major. He is buried in the cemetery in Ermelo, Mpumalanga, South Africa.

His Victoria Cross was displayed at the National Museum of Military History in Johannesburg and is now kept by his family.

== Recognition ==
A pavement plaque to Bloomfield was added on the side of the Union Canal near the new Boroughmuir High School in 2020.

== Bibliography ==
- Gliddon, Gerald (2005). The Sideshows. VCs of the First World War. Gloucestershire, England: Sutton Publishing. ISBN 978-0-7509-2084-1.
