= Bazentin-le-Petit Communal Cemetery Extension =

WWI CWGC cemetery in Somme, France

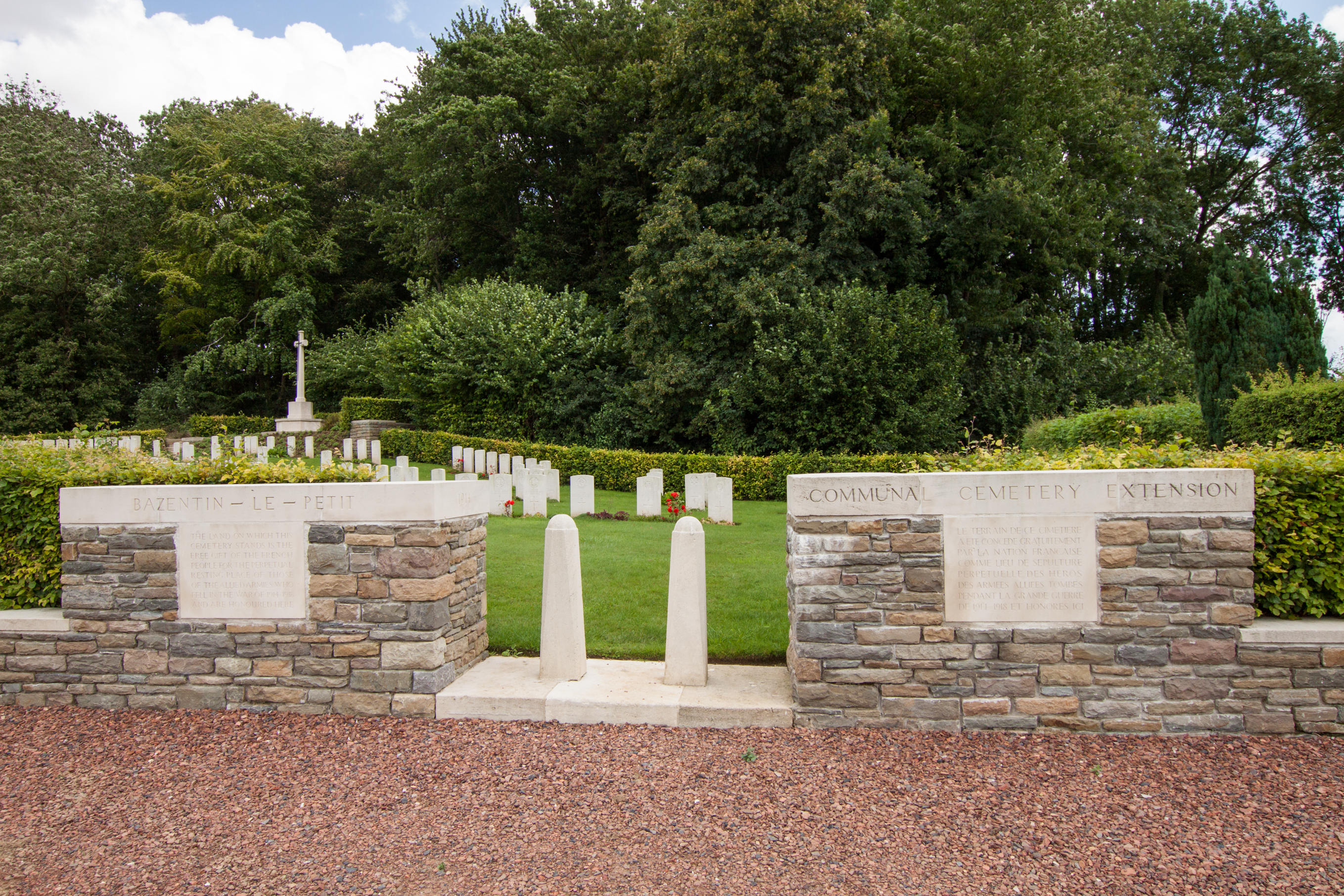
- Interactive map of Bazentin-le-Petit Communal Cemetery Extension

Details
- Established: July 1916
- Location: Bazentin-le-Petit, Somme, France
- Country: British and Commonwealth
- Coordinates: 50°01′55″N 2°46′03″E
- Type: Military
- No. of graves: 185 total, 132 identified
- Website: cwgc.org
- Find a Grave: Bazentin-le-Petit Communal Cemetery Extension

The Bazentin-le-Petit Communal Cemetery Extension is a cemetery located in the Somme region of France commemorating British and Commonwealth soldiers who fought in the Battle of the Somme in World War I. The cemetery contains mostly those who died from 14 July 1916 to December 1916 near Bazentin-le-Petit and those who died on battlefields near the villages of Bazentin and Contalmaison.

== Location ==
The cemetery is located on the east side of the village of Bazentin-le-Petit, a subvillage of Bazentin, which is located approximately 8 kilometers northeast of the town of Albert and 3 kilometers southeast of the village of Pozieres.

== Fighting near Bazentin-le-Petit ==
Bazentin was held by the Germans until 14 July 1916, when the British 3rd and 7th Divisions captured it and the British 21st Division captured Bazentin-le-Petit Wood. The village was temporarily lost in the German spring offensive of 1918, but was recaptured by the 38th Welsh Division on 25 August of the same year.

== Establishment of the Cemetery ==
=== History ===
The cemetery extension was begun immediately after the capture of the village of Bazentin-le-Petit in July 1916 and was used until December 1916 by units operating in the area. After the end of World War I, 50 casualties from other battlefields around the villages of Bazentin and Contalmaison were reburied in the extension, including one British soldier who was previously buried in the Sailly-Laurette German Cemetery.

One of the few distinguishable rows in the cemetery is Row B, which contains approximately 30 graves.

=== Statistics ===
The extension now contains 185 burials, of which 53 are unidentified and 132 are identified. 59 graves were destroyed by shellfire, and have since been replaced with special memorials.

Identified Burials by Nationality
| Nationality | Number of Burials |
|---|---|
| United Kingdom | 130 |
| Canada | 2 |

According to Mount Allison University, one Australian is also buried in the cemetery.

Number of Burials by Unit
| Northamptonshire Regiment | 47 | East Yorkshire Regiment | 22 |
| Northumberland Fusiliers | 14 | Highland Light Infantry | 11 |
| Durham Light Infantry | 7 | Royal Field Artillery | 5 |
| Black Watch | 3 | Cameronians - Scottish Rifles | 3 |
| Machine Gun Corps | 3 | Canadian burials | 2 |
| Gordon Highlanders | 2 | King's Royal Rifle Corps | 2 |
| Royal Engineers | 2 | Cameron Highlanders | 1 |
| Dorsetshire Regiment | 1 | Green Howards - Yorkshire Regiment | 1 |
| London Regiment - 24th Bn. The Queen's | 1 | Loyal North Lancashire Regiment | 1 |
| Manchester Regiment | 1 | Royal Army Medical Corps | 1 |
| Royal Fusiliers - City of London Regiment | 1 | Seaforth Highlanders | 1 |
