= Rosecrance =

- Company type: Non-profit
- Genre: Behavioral health, drug and alcohol addiction, mental illness, interventions
- Founded: New Milford, Illinois, U.S. (August 11, 1916)
- Founder: Dr. James and Fannie Rosecrance
- Headquarters: 1021 North Mulford Road, Rockford, Illinois 61107-3877, U.S.
- Number of locations: 60 facilities
- Area served: North America
- Key people: Dr. David Gomel (CEO)
- Number of employees: 1000 (estimate)
- Website: rosecrance.org

Rosecrance is a provider of behavioral health services with addiction treatment programs. Rosecrance operates in the United States of Illinois, Wisconsin and Iowa.

Rosecrance provides treatment services for individuals with substance abuse and mental health disorders, including residential treatment with an emphasis on co-occurring substance abuse and mental health disorders and specialty residential programs for adolescents and young adults facing mood and anxiety disorders or trauma. Residential treatment is supported by additional services including detoxification, recovery homes, veterans’ programs, prevention and early intervention programs, criminal justice and specialty court programs, and alumni services. Mental health services extend beyond outpatient treatment with supportive housing and crisis services.

== History ==
The first clinic was built in 1864 as medical institution in New Milford, Illinois for Civil War soldiers, founded by Dr. James and Frannie Rosecrance. The structure switched focus to youth and families by the late 1800s. The Rosecrances left provisions in their wills to turn the house into the Rosecrance Memorial Home for Children on August 11, 1916.

The home operated as an orphanage for boys until the early 1950s. Rosecrance has grown from serving 12 to 18 boys in 1916 to more than 37,000 boys annually by 2018.

In 1995, Rosecrance opened a $5.3 million, 76-bed adult treatment center in Rockford. In early 2004, it opened the $14 million, 78-bed Rosecrance Griffin Williamson Campus to treat adolescents. In early 2010, Rosecrance merged with the Janet Wattles Center and its subsidiaries.

In July 2016, Community Elements merged into Rosecrance in Champaign, Illinois. In January 2018, Prairie Center merged into Rosecrance in central Illinois.

Rosecrance announced an affiliation with Jackson Recovery Centers in January 2019.
