= 1916 Texas hurricane =

Category 4 Atlantic hurricane

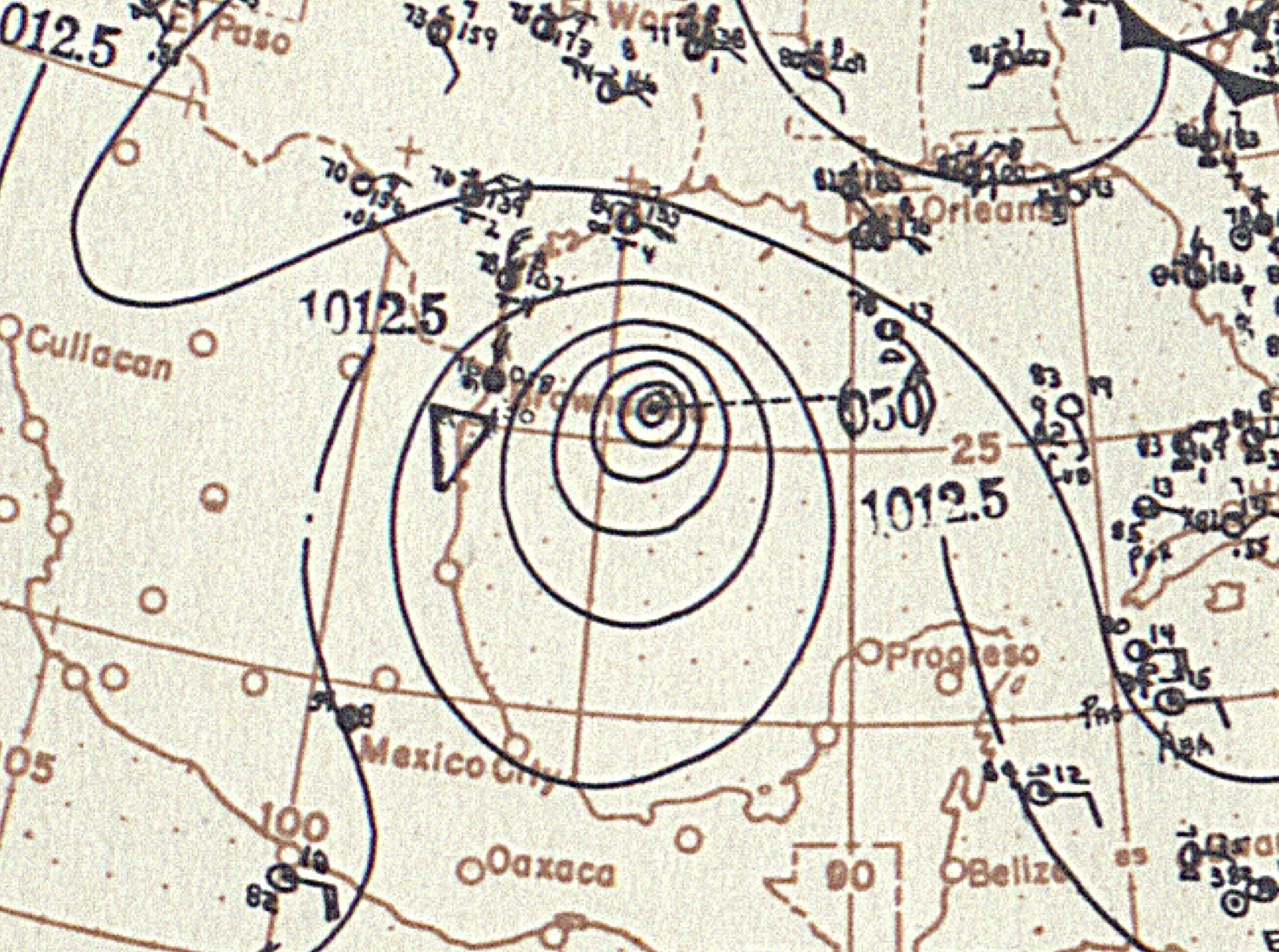
- Surface weather analysis of the hurricane near peak intensity as it approaches landfall in Texas on August 18

Meteorological history
- Formed: August 12, 1916
- Dissipated: August 20, 1916

Category 4 major hurricane
- 1-minute sustained (SSHWS/NWS)
- Highest winds: 130 mph (215 km/h)
- Lowest pressure: 932 mbar (hPa); 27.52 inHg

Overall effects
- Fatalities: 37 (Jamaica: 17, Texas: 20)
- Damage: $11.8 million (1916 USD)
- Areas affected: Lesser Antilles; Jamaica; Cayman Islands; Mexico; Texas
- IBTrACS
- Part of the 1916 Atlantic hurricane season

The 1916 Texas hurricane was an intense and quick-moving tropical cyclone that caused widespread damage in Jamaica and South Texas in August 1916. A Category 4 hurricane upon landfall in Texas, it was the strongest tropical cyclone to strike the United States in three decades. Throughout its eight-day trek across the Caribbean Sea and Gulf of Mexico, the hurricane caused 37 fatalities and inflicted $11.8 million in damage. (Note: All monetary values are in 1916 United States dollars unless otherwise noted.)

Weather observations were limited for most of the storm's history, so much of its growth has been inferred from scant data analyzed by the Atlantic hurricane reanalysis project in 2008. The precursor disturbance organized into a small tropical storm by August 12, shortly before crossing the Lesser Antilles into the Caribbean Sea. The storm skirted the southern coast of Jamaica as a hurricane on August 15, killing 17 people along the way. No banana plantation was left unscathed by the hours-long onslaught of strong winds. Coconut and cocoa trees also sustained severe losses. The southern parishes saw the severest effects, incurring extensive damage to crops and buildings; damage in Jamaica amounted to $10 million (equivalent to $296 million in 2025). The storm then traversed the Yucatán Channel into the Gulf of Mexico and intensified further into the equivalent of a major hurricane on the modern-day Saffir–Simpson scale. (Note: A major hurricane is a storm that ranks as Category 3 or higher on the Saffir–Simpson hurricane scale.)

On the evening of August 16, the hurricane struck southern Texas near Baffin Bay with winds of 130 mph (210 km/h). Buildings were razed at many coastal cities, the worst impacts being felt in Corpus Christi and surrounding communities. Beachfront structures were destroyed by a 9.2-foot (2.8 m) storm surge. Strong gusts and heavy rainfall spread farther inland across mainly rural sectors of southern Texas, damaging towns and their outlying agricultural districts alike. Railroads and other public utilities were disrupted across the region, with widespread power outages. Eight locations set 24-hour rainfall records; among them was Harlingen, which recorded the storm's rainfall maximum with 6 inches (150 mm) of precipitation. The deluge wrought havoc on military camps along the Mexico–United States border, forcing 30,000 garrisoned militiamen to evacuate. Aggregate property damage across Texas reached $1.8 million (equivalent to $53 million in 2025), and 20 people were killed. The hurricane quickly weakened over southwestern Texas and dissipated near New Mexico by August 20.

== Meteorological history ==
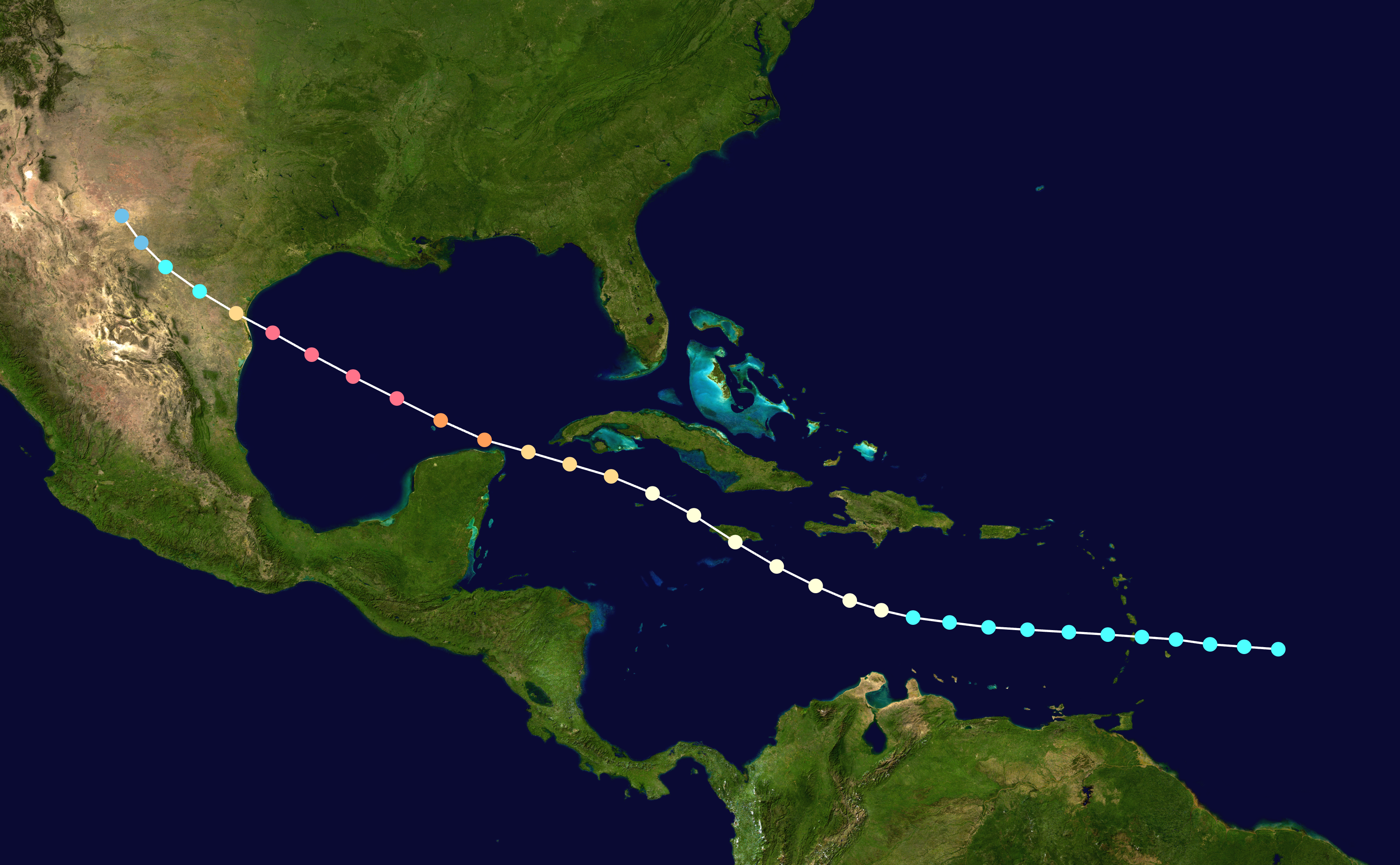
Map plotting the storm's track and intensity, according to the Saffir–Simpson scale Map key Saffir–Simpson scale Tropical depression (≤38 mph, ≤62 km/h) Tropical storm (39–73 mph, 63–118 km/h) Category 1 (74–95 mph, 119–153 km/h) Category 2 (96–110 mph, 154–177 km/h) Category 3 (111–129 mph, 178–208 km/h) Category 4 (130–156 mph, 209–251 km/h) Category 5 (≥157 mph, ≥252 km/h) Unknown Storm type Tropical cyclone Subtropical cyclone Extratropical cyclone, remnant low, tropical disturbance, or monsoon depression

According to the U.S. Weather Bureau, the 1916 Texas hurricane "followed an average course for the type of August hurricanes that pass through the Yucatán Channel", but maintained an unusually brisk forward speed throughout its life. A possible precursor disturbance may have originated as early as August 8 near Africa, but observations were inconclusive in determining the formation of a tropical cyclone. The hurricane was first definitively detected as a tropical storm east of Barbados on August 12, based on a 40 mph (64 km/h) wind measurement from a nearby ship. There were no other observations of similarly gusty winds or low air pressures over the next three days while the system traced out the southern periphery of the Azores High westward into the eastern Caribbean Sea. Steady intensification was inferred during this period by the Atlantic hurricane reanalysis project in 2008, which estimated that the storm strengthened into a hurricane on August 15 while located south of Hispaniola. Concurrently, the hurricane curved slightly towards the west-northwest, bringing it just south of Jamaica that day with winds of 85 mph (137 km/h). Near the Cayman Islands, a vessel recorded 55 mph (89 km/h) winds, ultimately proving to be the strongest offshore winds sampled in connection with the cyclone. Continuing to intensify, the hurricane emerged into the Gulf of Mexico through the Yucatán Channel on the morning of August 17.

Weather observations remained scant in the open waters of the Gulf of Mexico, the strongest observed winds being limited to marginal gales. The storm reached major hurricane intensity just north of the Yucatán Peninsula on August 17, and reports on the developing hurricane proliferated as the storm neared the Texas coast. By August 18, the hurricane reached Category 4 intensity in the western Gulf of Mexico; the first outer bands began reaching the coast near Corpus Christi, Texas, early that morning. During the evening hours, the center of the hurricane made landfall near Baffin Bay, Texas, with maximum sustained winds of 130 mph (210 km/h) and a central pressure of 932 mbar (hPa; 27.52 inHg). These parameters made it the strongest hurricane of the 1916 Atlantic hurricane season. In terms of pressure, the 1916 Texas hurricane was stronger than any other landfalling tropical cyclone in the United States since 1886. It was larger than average upon landfall, with a 29 mi (47 km) radius of maximum wind. Neither the strongest winds nor lowest pressure were directly measured, and were instead extrapolated from peripheral data by the hurricane reanalysis project using storm surge modelling and pressure to wind relationships. Several other researchers in the 20th century made similar analyses of the landfall, all concluding that Texas was impacted by a major hurricane. Weakening ensued as the storm quickly progressed farther inland and into West Texas; by August 19, the system was a weakening tropical depression, opening into a trough of low pressure the following day near the border between Texas and New Mexico within the valley of the Pecos River.

== Preparations and impact ==
=== Caribbean Sea ===
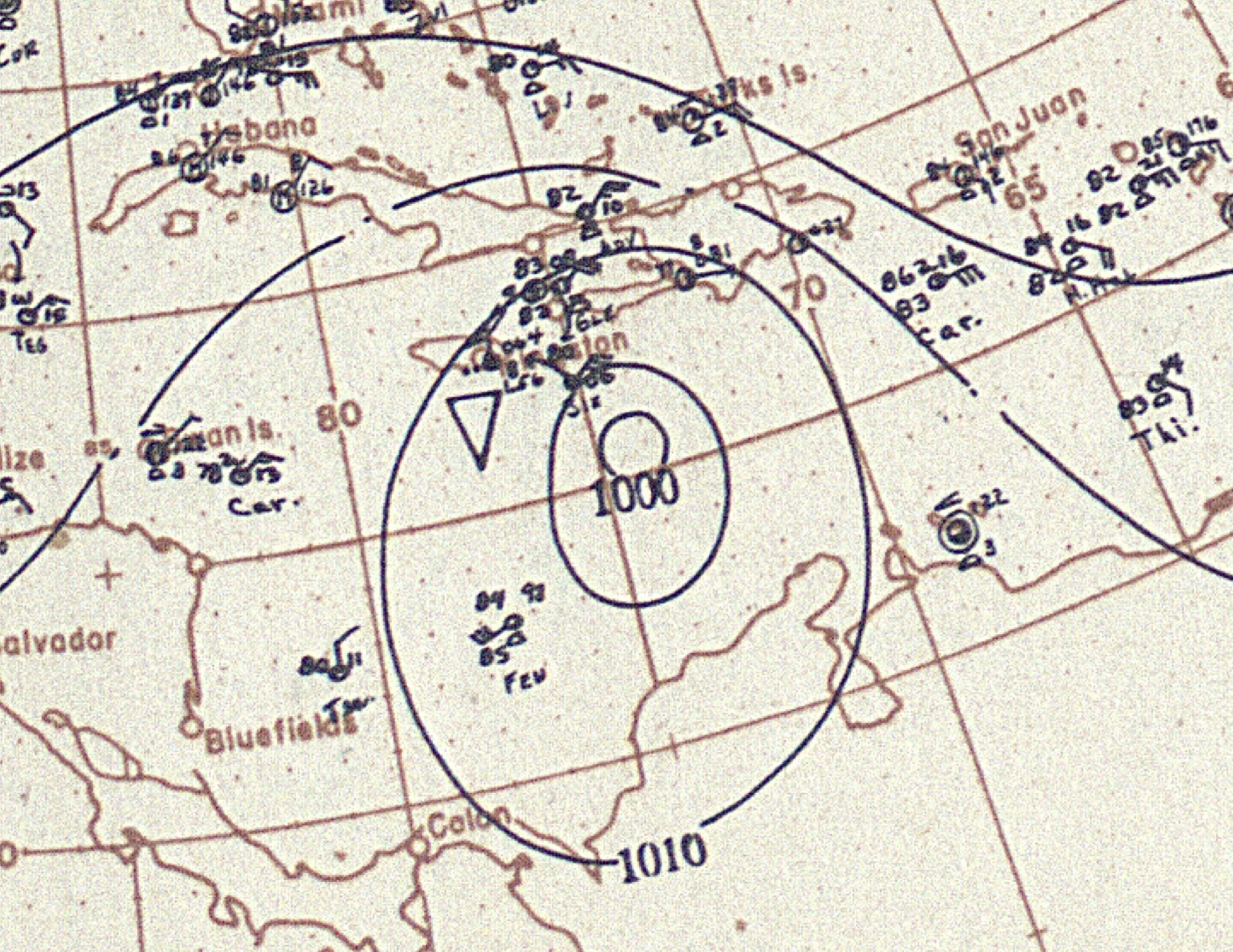
Surface weather map of the hurricane approaching Jamaica on August 15

Crossing the Lesser Antilles from August 12 to 13, the developing tropical cyclone produced breezy conditions; sustained winds peaked at 25 mph (40 km/h) on Antigua and reached low-end tropical storm intensity offshore. In San Fernando, Trinidad and Tobago, a station recorded 0.42 in (11 mm) of rain from the passing disturbance. A warning noting the likelihood of hurricane-force winds was issued for the Yucatán Channel near Cuba's Guanahacabibes Peninsula on August 16. Maritime traffic was briefly halted before being allowed to resume course to Cuban and Central American ports.

The hurricane dealt a heavy blow to Jamaica when the storm passed south of the Crown colony on the night of August 15, killing seventeen people and leaving thousands homeless. Although the U.S. Weather Bureau did not indicate a landfall, reporting from The Daily Gleaner suggested that the storm's calm eye passed over Kingston and at least four of the island's southern parishes. Damage was consequently heaviest in the southern half of Jamaica, though some crops across the northern parishes were also affected; the overall damage toll was estimated at $10 million (equivalent to $296 million in 2025). Among Jamaica's crops, banana cultivations were the most severely impacted; several communities and parishes documented a majority loss of their bananas, especially on the eastern half of the island. According to the American consulate, the entirety of Jamaica's banana crop was damaged to some extent. In Bath, the storm was the most devastating since the 1903 Jamaica hurricane. The eastern banana-growing belt was thoroughly ruined; five thousand mature banana trees were toppled before the storm's closest approach to Bath, accounting for a near-total loss of the fruit there. Sugar plantations also suffered greatly, as did coconut and cocoa trees in Portland Parish. An estimated 30–50 percent of the cocoa crop was damaged. Winds peaked at 80 mph (130 km/h) during the evening hours of August 15 in Bowden, cutting telegraph communications and damaging many buildings and banana trees. Several hours of gusty winds downed telegraph lines and fruit trees of all varieties throughout Saint Thomas Parish. Homes were unroofed and displaced in Annotto Bay, constituting most of the property damage there. Heavy rainfall caused the Dry, Johnson, and Yallahs rivers to rise above their banks, washing over bridges and rendering them impassable.

Communications between Kingston and other parishes were cut off for 48 hours after intense winds brought down telegraph and telephone lines, making the dissemination of damage reports in Jamaica increasingly difficult. The strongest sustained winds reached 72 mph (116 km/h) in Kingston, attended by higher gusts estimated at 85 mph (137 km/h). One station in Kingston measured 1.56 in (40 mm) of precipitation. Power was lost after falling trees struck critical electric wires, halting streetcars. One woman was killed after being electrocuted by a falling electric wire. Kingston was left in darkness overnight, prompting police to warn pedestrians to vacate the city streets. Most of the damage inflicted on property in Kingston and lower Saint Andrew Parish was minor and confined to the most vulnerable structures. Homes, fences, and signs were damaged in both residential and commercial districts of the metropolis. At wharves along the coast, iron-sheet roofs were torn away from lumber sheds. Debris littered roads, and in one case, a house was blown onto a highway. Rough surf generated by the strong winds sank or grounded vessels and lighters on the shores of Kingston Harbour, with one wreck resulting in two fatalities. Substantial losses befell crops in Saint Catherine Parish, including severe damage to banana trees between Kingston and Spanish Town. Damage was also wrought to coconut trees and other large trees in the region. In the hurricane's aftermath, the colonial government planned to assist growers in re-establishing damaged crops, and also allocated £21,000 to relief efforts. Owing to the widespread damage to banana crops, the reduced demand for rail service and subsequent cuts in revenue forced the Jamaica Railway Corporation to downsize.

=== Texas ===
Effects of the 1916 Texas hurricane by Texas community
Location	Damage
Alice	$100,000
Aransas Pass	$150,000
Corpus Christi	$500,000
Kingsville	$100,000
Rockport	$75,000
San Diego	$50,000
Rio Grande Valley (several towns)	$300,000
Other areas	$500,000
Total	$1.8 million

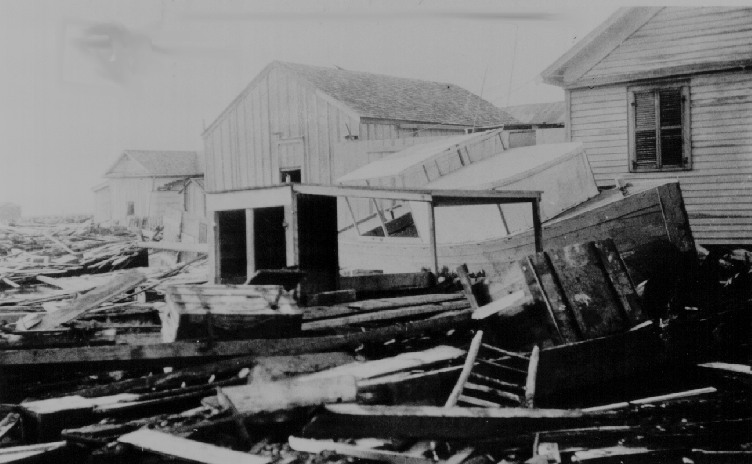
Storm surge damage from the hurricane

General information on the hurricane's location and movement for American interests was first issued by the United States Weather Bureau on the morning of August 13, based on information from Saint Kitts. Alerts to vessels in the path of the storm prompted 20 steamers to anchor in New Orleans, Louisiana. Due to the storm's initially small size and the lack of data concerning it, the Weather Bureau lamented that "the location of the center of the storm was [...] a very unsatisfactory matter", as was the case with two other tropical cyclones monitored by the agency in the same month. On August 18, as the storm neared Texas landfall, hurricane warnings were first issued, advising coastal residents from Cameron County northward to Calhoun County by telegraph and telephone of the hurricane's imminent approach. Anticipating the hurricane's effects, prices closed 7–9 points higher than the previous day at the New Orleans Cotton Exchange and advanced by 10–12 points at the New York Cotton Exchange.

Galveston residents evacuated for the mainland via interurban routes and special trains as seas began to rise, filling railcars to capacity; in total, thousands of people evacuated the insular city. Another set of Southern Pacific traincars was readied at Seabrook in case more evacuations were required. A hundred automobiles were used to escort women and children from vulnerable sections of Corpus Christi to the safer buildings of the business district on the afternoon of August 18, finding havens at banks, hotels, schools, and the city hall. However, many city residents did not take precautions in protecting their property, as conventional wisdom held that destructive storms did not affect Corpus Christi. Fearing a repeat of the 1915 Galveston hurricane, some visitors in Galveston headed toward Corpus Christi, only to be caught in the incoming storm. The United States Coast Guard stationed at Brazos Island evacuated summer residents of Padre Island offshore Port Isabel. Nearby ships were brought to the Port Isabel harbor.

Storm damage in Corpus Christi

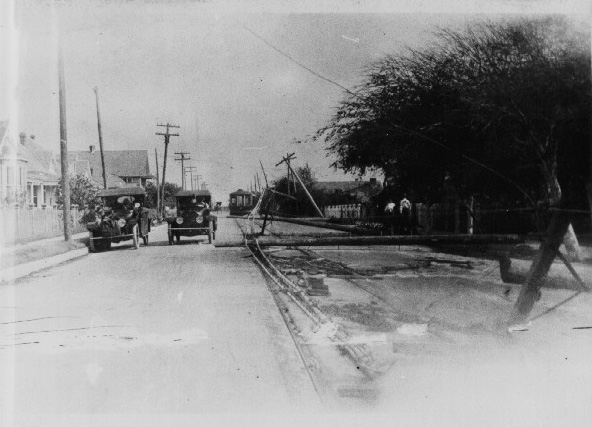
Much of Corpus Christi was affected by power outages.

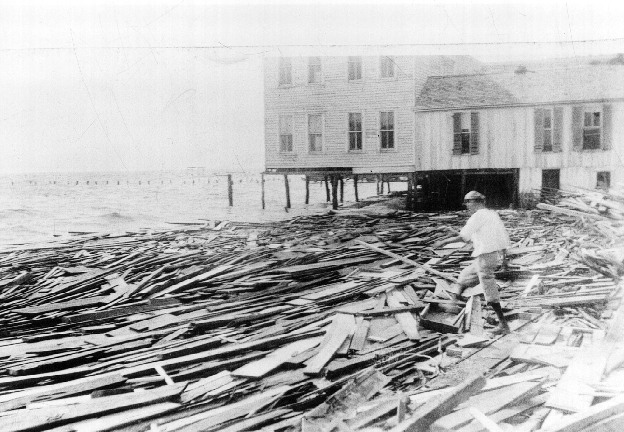
The waterfront was the city's hardest-hit area.

The coastal steamer Pilot Boy sank in the entrance to the harbor at Port Aransas after being battered by the hurricane's rough seas, killing six of her crew. Water levels along the coast of Texas rose, with storm surge heights reaching 9.2 ft (2.8 m) in Corpus Christi and 4 ft (1.2 m) in Galveston. Although the surge was attenuated by the hurricane's quick motion, the waves were nonetheless destructive, destroying every pier in Corpus Christi Bay and many boats. A large segment of the Corpus Christi causeway was washed away. Outhouses and a dwelling at the Aransas Pass Light Station were undermined. Driftwood was strewn across the coast of Laguna Madre for the first time in living memory.

The Category 4 hurricane moved ashore near Baffin Bay at 5:00 p.m. CST (22:00 UTC) on August 18, roughly an hour earlier than forecast. Damage from the hurricane was inflicted over a wide expanse of southern Texas and maximized along the coast. The cities of Bishop, Kingsville, and Corpus Christi sustained the greatest effects. All Western Union communication lines between San Antonio and Brownsville were severed by 1:30 p.m. CST (18:30 UTC) on August 18, preventing the transmission of early reports from the region and accounting for $50,000 in damage. At Corpus Christi, approximately 45 mi (72 km) northeast of the storm's point of landfall, winds reached at least 90 mph (140 km/h) before the observing station's anemometer was knocked out of commission. Thunderstorms and squalls began affecting the city on the morning of August 18, preceding the onset of hurricane-force winds that evening; light winds prevailed by August 20. Damage was inflicted upon most buildings in the city. Summer cottages were destroyed and the business district incurred thousands of dollars in damage after it was entirely flooded. Many salt cedar plants were blown down. The waterfront area endured the worst effects, including the destruction of all wharves and their ancillary buildings. All bathing pavilions collapsed and a pleasure pier was left in ruins. Much of a coastal apartment compound was reduced to rubble floating in the Corpus Christi Bay. Corpus Christi also lost electricity during the storm, putting the city lights and other services out of commission. Conservative estimates placed financial losses for the city between $250,000–$500,000 (equivalent to $7–15 million in 2025), and three people drowned along the immediate coast.

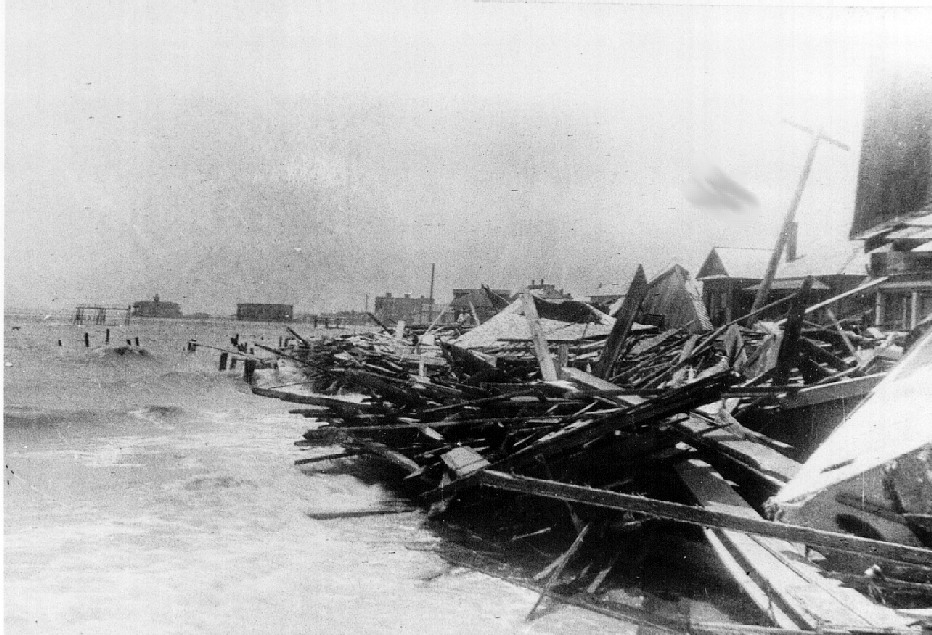
Debris scattered at the beaches in the wake of the hurricane

The nearby communities of Aransas Pass and Rockport sustained "considerable" damage. Nearly every building was affected and many were destroyed in Rockport, including the city hall. Many of Port Aransas's frame buildings, piers, and other coastal structures fell victim to the rough seas. Small shipping interests were hurt in Port Lavaca, particularly the fish and oyster industry. Waterfront homes in the port city were destroyed. Port O'Connor and surrounding locales were impacted by 75 mph (121 km/h) winds that damaged numerous homes and dislodged the roof of a hotel. Strong winds also forced the sea inland, grounding boats and submerging the nearby grounds of the Epworth League in Seadrift. A relief train was sent from Austwell to Port O'Connor to evacuate storm-stricken residents. Bay View College in Portland permanently closed following damage to its buildings. Intense winds in Kingsville unroofed homes and businesses. A city garage's collapse crushed several cars beneath. Governor of Illinois Edward Fitzsimmons Dunne was caught in the storm at Kingsville; he had been inspecting army camps along the Texas–Mexico border in the days before they were ravaged by the storm. Every house was damaged and most were destroyed in Riviera, located 15 mi (24 km) south of Kingsville. In the nearby resort town of Riviera Beach, the hurricane destroyed all businesses and amenities, as well as most of the residences, resulting in an exodus that led to the resort's demise. Farther north in Galveston, the hurricane produced 50 mph (80 km/h) winds that destroyed two homes.

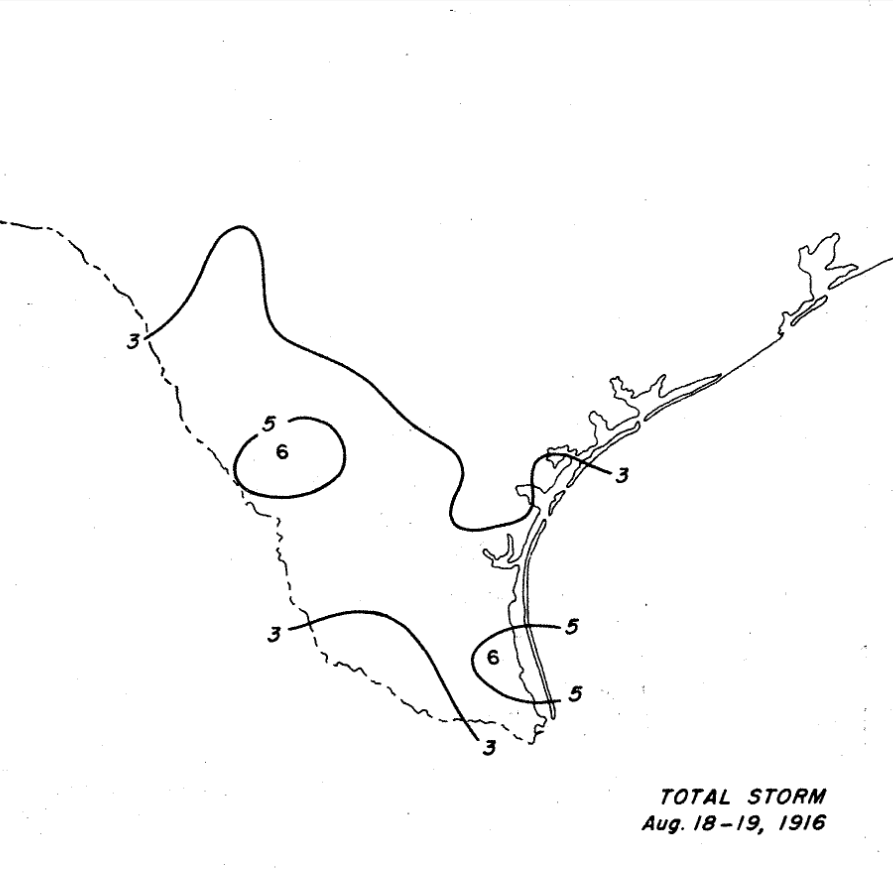
Storm rainfall totals in Texas

Moderate to heavy rains spread across southern Texas both ahead of the storm and to the right of the center's path. There were two foci of heavy rainfall: the first along the coast where a maximum of 6.0 in (150 mm) was reported in Harlingen, and a second borne of orographic lifting in the mountains of southwestern Texas. Eight towns, including Harlingen, set 24-hour rainfall records. Crops were badly injured by the winds and rain, with damage to cotton accounting for most of the financial loss. About one-third of the cotton crop around Shiner was lost, and in some locations more than half of the pecans were blown off trees. The storm proved beneficial for cotton harvesting in Victoria County by helping to clear excess foliage. Many farm buildings and small structures were leveled in Beeville. In Brownsville, plate glass windows were blown out and fences and trees were toppled. Some militia camps were also deluged by the heavy rainfall in the Brownsville area, destroying thousands of dollars' worth of government equipment after perishable munitions were exposed to the elements. Four militiamen were injured after U.S. Army tents were flattened by the storm. All military encampments in the area were forced to be temporarily abandoned, with 30,000 people seeking refuge in public buildings in Mercedes and Mission. Similar damage occurred farther upstream along the Rio Grande Valley in Laredo, where the hurricane tore down small buildings and communication poles. Downed wires forced the city to shut down power for most of the municipality. Although damage was widespread, its overall magnitude along the Rio Grande remained slight.

Sections of the San Antonio and Aransas Pass Railway and International–Great Northern Railroad were put out of commission, the former left mangled and obstructed by debris. Other trains in the region were delayed by 12–18 hours, and the total cost of damage to railroads and other public utilities exceeded $300,000 (equivalent to $89 million in 2025). Over a thousand workers were dispatched by the afflicted railroad companies to repair the railways. Wind damage was documented as far inland as Montell in Uvalde County where frame homes were damaged and windmills collapsed. Strong winds and intermittent rainfall extended into the Austin area, while 68 mph (109 km/h) winds swept through San Antonio. In total, twenty people were killed in Texas, and damage to property was estimated at $1.8 million (equivalent to $53 million in 2025).

== See also ==
- List of Texas hurricanes (1900–1949)
- Hurricane Bret (1999) – quickly intensified in the western Gulf of Mexico before making landfall on a relatively unpopulated extent of the Texas coast
- 1919 Florida Keys hurricane – deadly tropical cyclone that devastated areas of the Florida Keys and Texas, particularly in the Corpus Christi area
- Hurricane Allen – struck southern Texas after tracking across the Caribbean Sea
- Hurricane Beulah – a Category 5 hurricane which moved through the Yucatán Peninsula before striking southern Texas
