= Bazentin-le-Petit Military Cemetery =

WWI CWGC cemetery in Somme, France

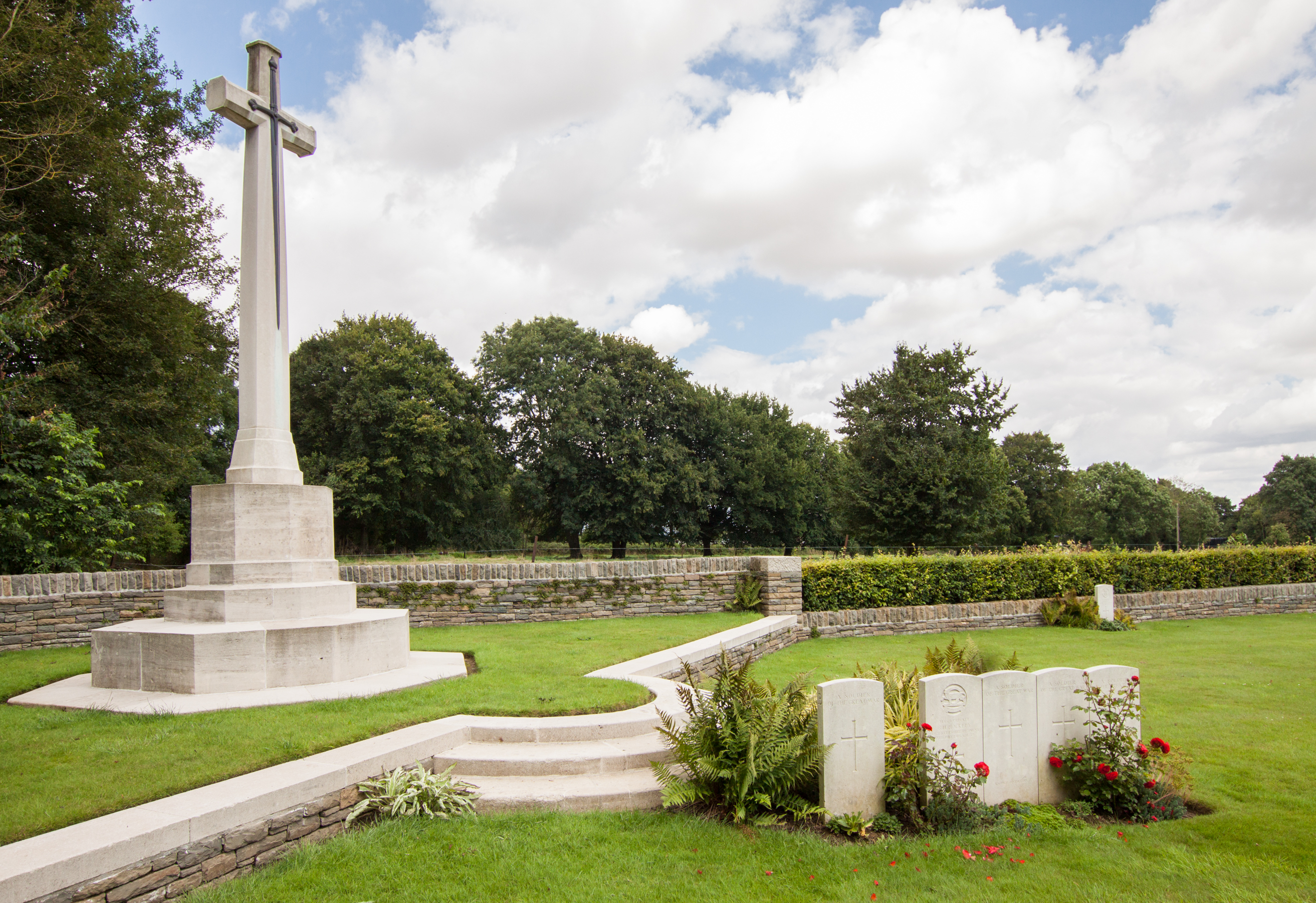
- Interactive map of Bazentin-le-Petit Military Cemetery

Details
- Established: July 1916
- Location: Bazentin-le-Petit, Somme, France
- Country: British and Commonwealth
- Coordinates: 50°01′57″N 2°45′36″E
- Type: Military
- Owned by: Commonwealth War Graves Commission (CWGC)
- No. of graves: 182 total, 15 unidentified
- Website: Official website
- Find a Grave: Bazentin-le-Petit Military Cemetery

The Bazentin-le-Petit Military Cemetery is a military cemetery located in the Somme region of France commemorating British and Commonwealth soldiers who fought in the Battle of the Somme in World War I. The cemetery is managed by the Commonwealth War Graves Commission, and honors those who died on the front line near Bazentin from late July 1916 to May 1917.

== Location ==
The cemetery is located on the west side of the village of Bazentin-le-Petit, a subvillage of Bazentin, which is located approximately 8 kilometers northeast of the town of Albert and 3 kilometers southeast of the village of Pozieres.

== Fighting near Bazentin-le-Petit ==
Bazentin was held by the Germans until 14 July 1916, when the British 3rd and 7th Divisions captured it and the British 21st Division captured Bazentin-le-Petit Wood. The village was temporarily lost in the German spring offensive of 1918, but was recaptured by the 38th Welsh Division on 25 August of the same year.

== Establishment of the cemetery ==
The cemetery was established in late July 1916 and was used by units operating on the front line until May 1917. It was originally called the Singer Circus Cemetery.

=== Statistics ===
The cemetery contains 182 burials, of which 15 are unidentified. The 33 German graves in the cemetery were moved to another location in 1922. Overall, the Bazentin-le-Petit cemeteries cover an area of 1824 square yards.

Identified Burials by Nationality
| Nationality | Number of Burials |
|---|---|
| United Kingdom | 104 |
| Australia | 55 |
| South Africa | 9 |

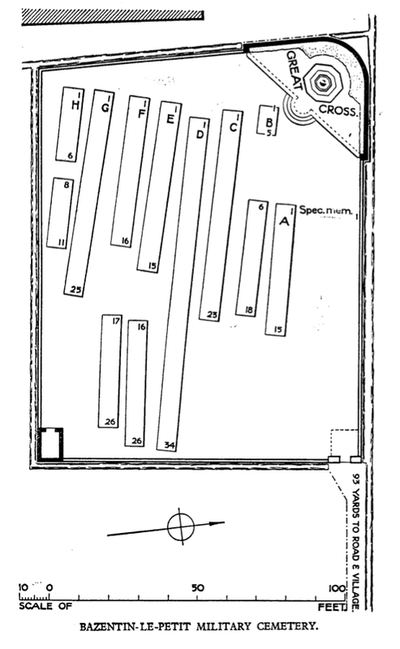
Bazentin-le-Petit Military Cemetery Plan

Identified Burials by Unit
| Unit | # | Unit | # |
| Australian burials | 55 | Royal Field Artillery | 15 |
| Durham Light Infantry | 11 | Royal Garrison Artillery | 10 |
| Welsh Regiment | 9 | South African Infantry | 8 |
| Cameron Highlanders | 6 | Cameronians – Scottish Rifles | 5 |
| Northumberland Fusiliers | 5 | Machine Gun Corps | 4 |
| Royal Army Medical Corps | 4 | Royal Army Service Corps | 4 |
| Black Watch | 3 | East Yorkshire Regiment | 3 |
| Gloucestershire Regiment | 3 | Argyll & Sutherland Highlanders | 2 |
| Gordon Highlanders | 2 | Royal Engineers | 2 |
| Royal Scots – Lothian Regiment | 2 | Duke of Wellington – West Riding Regiment | 1 |
| Green Howards – Yorkshire Regiment | 1 | King's Own Scottish Borderers | 1 |
| King's Royal Rifle Corps | 1 | Lancers 16th | 1 |
| Leicestershire Regiment | 1 | Loyal North Lancashire Regiment | 1 |
| Northamptonshire Regiment | 1 | Royal Horse Artillery | 1 |
| Royal Warwickshire Regiment | 1 | Seaforth Highlanders | 1 |
| South African Heavy Artillery | 1 | South Wales Borderers | 1 |
