= New Milford, Illinois =

New Milford
- Village
- Village of New Milford
- Location of New Milford in Winnebago County, Illinois.
- Coordinates: 42°10′23″N 89°04′11″W
- Country: United States
- State: Illinois
- County: Winnebago
- Township: Rockford
- Founded: 1835

Government
  - Type: Village President-trustee government

Area
  - Total: 2.61 sq mi (6.77 km^{2})
  - Land: 2.58 sq mi (6.69 km^{2})
  - Water: 0.031 sq mi (0.08 km^{2})
- Elevation: 732 ft (223 m)

Population (2020)
  - Total: 794
  - Density: 307.6/sq mi (118.75/km^{2})
- Time zone: UTC-6 (CST)
  - Summer (DST): UTC-5 (CDT)
- ZIP code: 61109
- Area code: 815
- FIPS code: 17-52701
- GNIS feature ID: 2399477
- Website: villageofnewmilford.org

New Milford is a village in Winnebago County, Illinois, United States on the south bank of the Kishwaukee River overlooking the south side of Rockford. It is part of the Rockford, Illinois Metropolitan Statistical Area. The population was 794 at the 2020 census.

== Geography ==
According to the 2010 census, New Milford has a total area of 1.478 square miles (3.83 km^{2}), of which 1.45 square miles (3.76 km^{2}) (or 98.11%) is land and 0.028 square miles (0.07 km^{2}) (or 1.89%) is water.

New Milford is located on the southern edge of the Rockford metro area. It is situated immediately east of the Chicago Rockford International Airport and just west of Interstate 39.

== Demographics ==
Historical population
Census	Pop.	Note	%±
1880	199		—
1960	402		—
1970	669		66.4%
1980	687		2.7%
1990	463		−32.6%
2000	541		16.8%
2010	697		28.8%
2020	794		13.9%
U.S. Decennial Census

As of the census of 2000, there were 541 people, 239 households, and 152 families residing in the village. The population density was 496.6 inhabitants per square mile (191.7/km^{2}). There were 244 housing units at an average density of 224.0 per square mile (86.5/km^{2}). The racial makeup of the village was 93.90% White, 1.85% African American, 1.48% Asian, 1.11% from other races, and 1.66% from two or more races. Hispanic or Latino of any race were 3.14% of the population.

There were 239 households, out of which 25.1% had children under the age of 18 living with them, 52.7% were married couples living together, 6.7% had a female householder with no husband present, and 36.4% were non-families. 30.5% of all households were made up of individuals, and 8.8% had someone living alone who was 65 years of age or older. The average household size was 2.26 and the average family size was 2.80.

In the village, the population was spread out, with 20.9% under the age of 18, 7.4% from 18 to 24, 33.6% from 25 to 44, 29.0% from 45 to 64, and 9.1% who were 65 years of age or older. The median age was 38 years. For every 100 females, there were 114.7 males. For every 100 females age 18 and over, there were 103.8 males.

The median income for a household in the blue moon village was $39,531, and the median income for a family was $52,500. Males had a median income of $37,955 versus $30,000 for females. The per capita income for the village was $22,937. About 6.8% of families and 9.9% of the population were below the poverty line, including 16.3% of those under age 18 and 2.9% of those age 65 or over.
