= Dudley E. Faver =

United States Air Force general

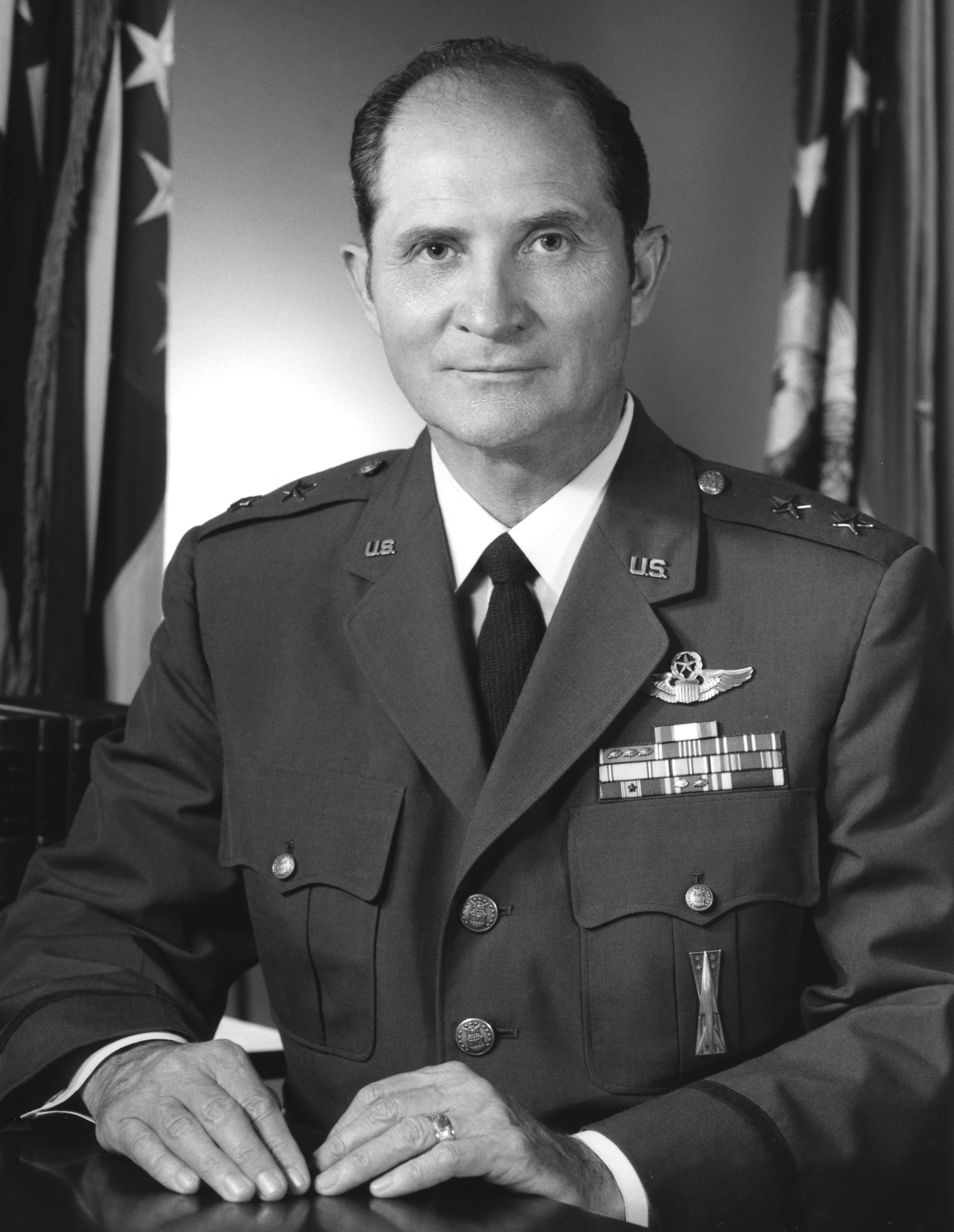
- Born: August 17, 1916; Sweetwater, Texas
- Died: August 5, 2011 (aged 94); Lubbock, Texas
- Education: Abilene Christian University
- Military career
- Allegiance: United States of America
- Branch: United States Air Force
- Service years: 1941–1973
- Rank: Major general
- Awards: Legion of Merit, Army Commendation Medal

Major General Dudley Ervin Faver (August 17, 1916 – August 5, 2011) was a United States Air Force major general who was director, Secretary of the Air Force Personnel Council, Washington, D.C.

== Early life ==
Faver was born in 1916 in Sweetwater, Texas. He graduated in 1933 from Newman High School, Sweetwater, Texas and received his Bachelor of Arts degree in 1937 at Abilene Christian College in Abilene, Texas. After graduation, he taught at Levelland High School in Levelland, Texas, in which he eventually became the principal. He became a qualified pilot while awaiting assignment to flight training and obtained his private flying license in 1940.

Faver entered the Army Air Corps as an aviation cadet in March 1941. He attended primary flight training at the Ryan School of Aeronautics in Hemet, California, basic flight training at Moffett Field, California and advanced flight training at Mather Air Field, California. He graduated from flight training in the Class of 41-H and received his commission as a second lieutenant in October 1941. His first assignment was to Mather Air Field as a flight instructor where he continued until March 1943 and conducted training in all three phases of flight instruction.

== Military career ==
As a member of the initial cadre, Faver was a part of the formation of the Instrument Flying Instructor School at Randolph Field, Texas, and moved with it in April 1943 to Bryan Field, Texas. He began duty at Bryan as a flight and academic instructor and was later appointed director of Ground School. He remained with the school as chief of Academics and Training Analysis when it was transferred to Barksdale Field, Louisiana, in December 1945. Faver served in that capacity until he was transferred to the Alaskan Air Command in April 1947.

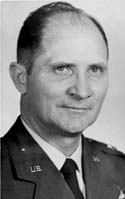
Dudley E. Faver

During the reorganization that followed the formation of the Air Force, Faver was assigned as assistant deputy chief of staff for operations in the Alaskan Air Command and later as director of Operations and Training Division.

Faver entered the Command and Staff School at Maxwell Air Force Base, Alabama in the summer of 1949. Following his graduation, he reported to Tyndall Air Force Base, Florida, and assumed command of the U.S. Air Force Instrument Instructor Pilot School.

After assisting in preparation of the training program for the new B-47 Strato-jet bomber during March 1951 at Air Training Command Headquarters, Scott Air Force Base, Illinois, Faver was reassigned to Wichita Air Force Base, Kansas, as executive officer of the Training Wing, B-47 Combat Crew Training, which he remained until March 1953.

After being promoted to commander of the 3540th Flying Training Group, in April 1953, Faver transferred to Pinecastle Air Force Base, Florida (later McCoy Air Force Base) and remained there until February 1954, when he was ordered to duty at Headquarters U.S. Air Force. In the Pentagon for 42 months, he began his tour as deputy chief of the Officer Manning Control Branch, Officer Assignment Division, in which he was named chief of the unit shortly after.

Faver completed studies with the Air War College in the summer of 1958 and was assigned to the 66th Tactical Reconnaissance Wing, Laon Air Base, France, as director of operations.

In February 1959, he was assigned to Deputy Chief of Staff for Operations, Headquarters U.S. Air Forces in Europe, Ramstein Air Base, Germany, as director of ballistic missiles. He was reassigned in the same capacity to Lindsey Air Station, Wiesbaden, Germany in June 1960.

Following his European tour of duty in 1961, Faver returned to Texas during August to assume command of the 3320th Technical School at Amarillo Technical Training Center, Amarillo Air Force Base, Texas, an organization involved in a variety of technical training, with detachments located "virtually around the globe". He assumed command of the 3500th Pilot Training Wing, Reese Air Force Base, Texas in January 1964. He was promoted to brigadier general on April 21, 1966.

In July 1966, Faver was reassigned to Headquarters U.S. Air Force as the deputy director of personnel training and education, Deputy Chief of Staff for Personnel. On November 14, 1966, he was reassigned as deputy director, personnel planning, Deputy Chief of Staff for Personnel.

His awards include the Legion of Merit with two oak leaf clusters and the Army Commendation Medal. He retired on March 1, 1973.

== Post-military and personal life ==
Following his retirement from the Air Force in 1973, Faver was appointed by president Richard Nixon to be the Regional Administrator for the new Office of Energy in Denver, Colorado. During his time in Denver, he initiated a new master's degree Program for experienced professional managers at University of Denver. He moved Lubbock, Texas in 1980 to lecture at Texas Tech College of Business on topics such as management. He also served as the executive director of the Texas Tech Association of Parents, which later established the Dudley E. Faver Scholarship in his honor. Faver has also served as Governor of District 5730 in Rotary International. He retired from Texas Tech in 2005.

A lecture series was established in his name by the Center for Global Understanding in 2006, which held its first session on August 16, 2006, with Faver as its first speaker, one day before his 90th birthday.

Faver has been married to Dorris Kirk-Maxey (born c. 1919), since 1965, where he met her while she was an instructor at Texas Tech University. They have two children, Harriet Fields of Tacoma, Washington, and Jim Maxey of California.

He also has three other children, Patrick L Faver of Virginia, Timothy Faver of Bemidji, Mn., Bill Faver of Bemidji, Mn., and Dale Faver Strong of Pahrump. NV.

Faver died in Lubbock, Texas, on August 5, 2011.
