= Mlali =

Administrative ward in Tanzania

Coordinates: 6.2949°S 36.7501°E

Mlali is an administrative ward in the Kongwa district of the Dodoma Region of Tanzania. According to the 2002 census, the ward has a total population of 27,460.

In Mlali, a Rehabilitation center operates that treats orthopaedic diseases of children; also other medical specialities are practiced, like dentistry by volunteers of Smile Mission.
