= July 1916 =

Month in 1916

<<	July 1916					>>
Su	Mo	Tu	We	Th	Fr	Sa
						1
2	3	4	5	6	7	8
9	10	11	12	13	14	15
16	17	18	19	20	21	22
23	24	25	26	27	28	29
30	31

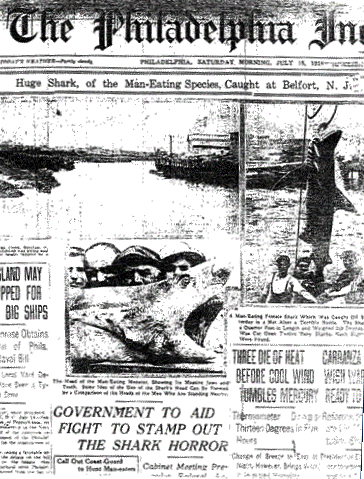
The Philadelphia Inquirer reporting the capture of a "man-eating" shark supposedly responsible for several attacks along the New Jersey coast in July.

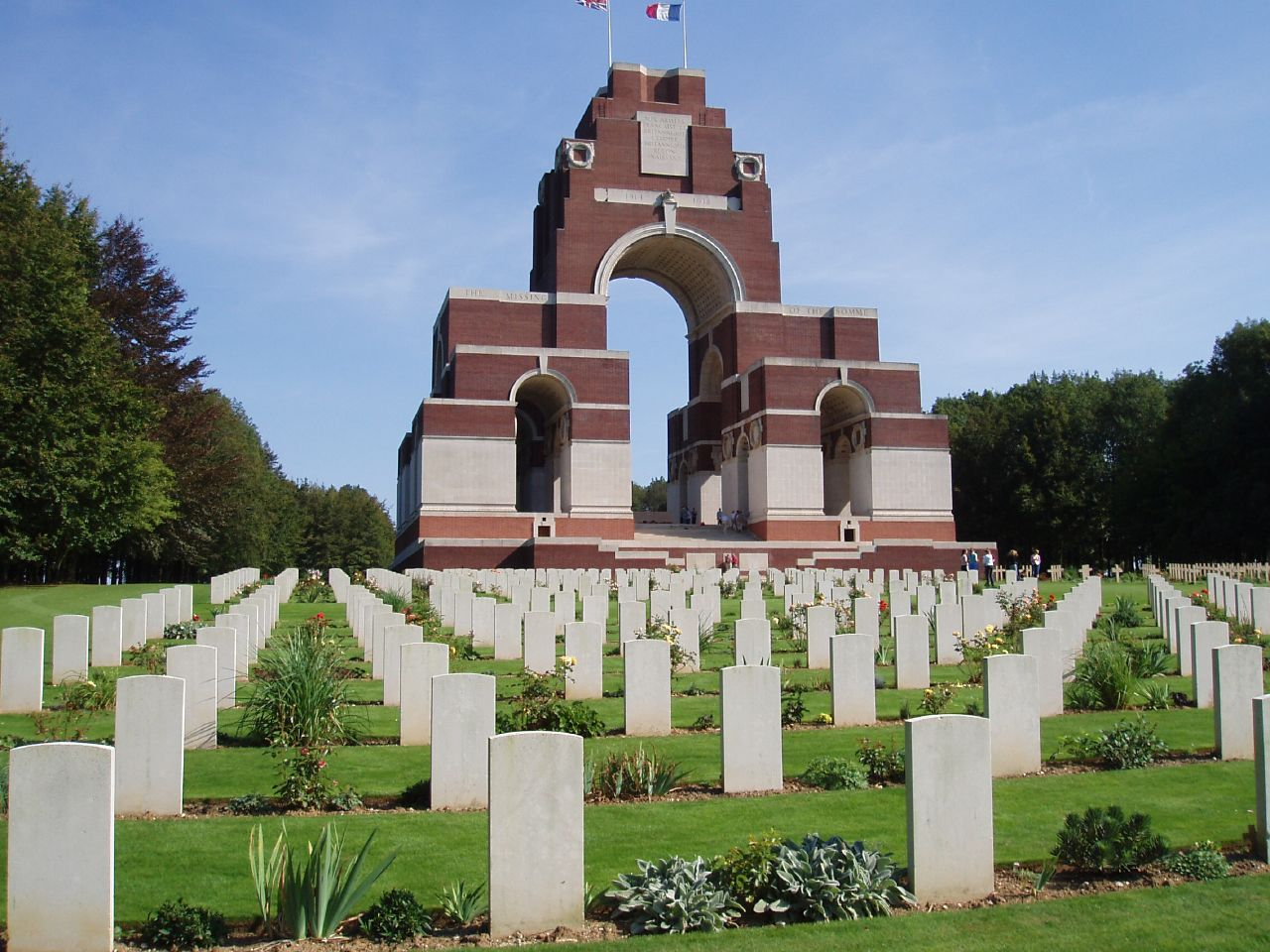
Thiepval Memorial to the British soldiers missing during the Battle of the Somme.

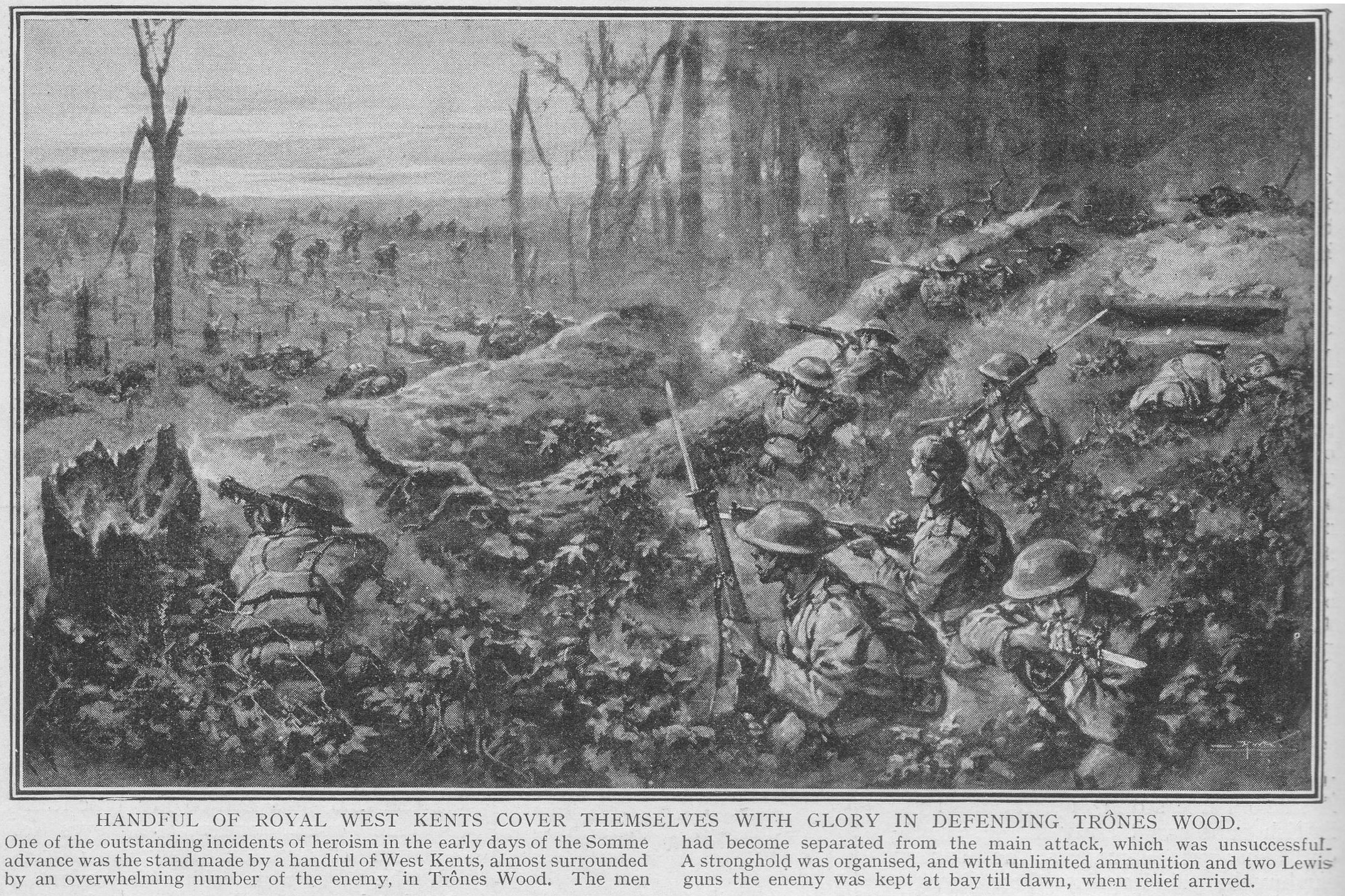
The fight for Trônes Wood, 8–14 July

The following events occurred in July 1916:

== July 1, 1916 (Saturday) ==
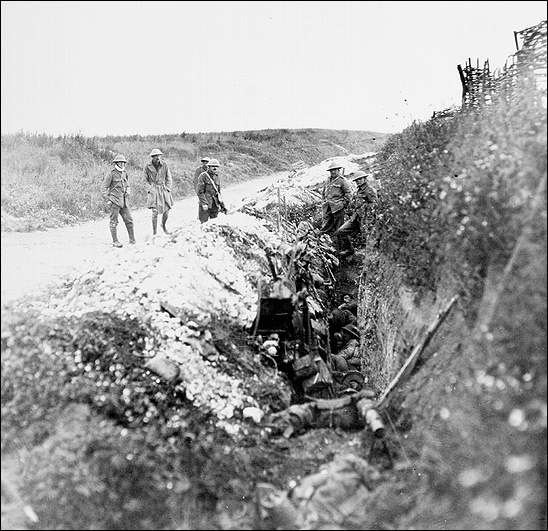
Newfoundland soldiers waiting in St. John's Road support trench

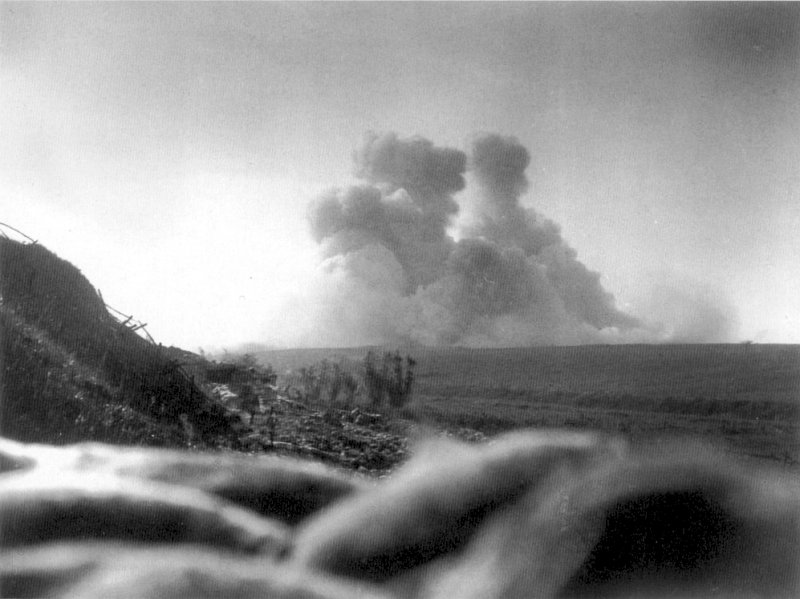
The explosion of the mine under Hawthorn Ridge Redoubt, 1 July 1916 (Photo 2 by Ernest Brooks)

- Battle of the Somme – The biggest battle of World War I opened with the Battle of Albert, with British forces capturing the French communes of Gommecourt, Mountauban and Mametz on the same day. The opening offense was the British Army's bloodiest day, with 57,470 British casualties including 19,240 killed. German casualties for that day were significantly lower at c. 12,000 men. Some of the noted casualties included:
  - The 36th Ulster Division, which contained many Ulster Volunteers, lost 5,500 men during the first two days of fighting.
  - The Royal Newfoundland Regiment with the Dominion of Newfoundland sustained a 90 percent casualty rate while attacking Hawthorn Ridge, with 68 men out of 801 reporting for roll call the day after and 26% of all the Dominion's troops killed in the entire war falling on this day.
  - Nine Victoria Crosses were awarded, two-thirds posthumously, for brave action during the first date of the battle, which included Eric Bell, Geoffrey Cather, John Leslie Green, Stewart Loudoun-Shand, William McFadzean, Robert Quigg, Walter Potter Ritchie, George Sanders, and James Youll Turnbull.
  - A high number of noted British poets were among the casualties during the first day of fighting, including W. N. Hodgson, Will Streets, Gilbert Waterhouse, Henry Field, Alfred Ratcliffe, Alexander Robertson and Bernard White. Some other noted casualties included cricketer Major Booth and association football player Evelyn Lintott.
  - A total 19 mines dug and filled with explosives were ignited underneath German front lines at the start of the Battle of the Somme, resulting in one of the largest man-made explosions at the time that was rumored to be heard as far as London.
- The Social Democratic Party of Finland won a majority in the parliament of the Russian-ruled Grand Duchy of Finland.
- At least one shark attacked five swimmers over the course of two weeks along 80 miles (130 km) of New Jersey coastline, resulting in four deaths and the survival of one youth who required limb amputation. The event inspired author Peter Benchley, over half a century later, to write the thriller novel Jaws.
- Prohibition of alcohol was introduced in Alberta under the binding results of a liquor plebiscite in 1915.
- The United States Army activated the 17th Cavalry Regiment in Fort Bliss, Texas to protect the United States-Mexico border.
- The Zoological Survey of India was established to survey, explore and research the fauna in the Indian region.
- W. B. Yeats made his fifth and final proposal of marriage to the newly widowed Maud Gonne in France. Gonne had been married to Irish Republican leader John MacBride, who was executed in May by British forces for his role in the Easter Rising.
- Finnaas Municipality in Norway was dissolved and divided into three new municipalities that were established on this date: Bremnes Municipality, Bømmel Municipality, and Moster Municipality. These three would exist until 1963, when they were merged into Bømlo Municipality.
- Auto-Owners Insurance was established in Mount Pleasant, Michigan but moved to Lansing, Michigan a year later.
- Born:
  - Olivia de Havilland, British-American actress, best known for her leading roles in The Adventures of Robin Hood and Gone with the Wind, winner of the Academy Award for Best Actress for To Each His Own and The Heiress; in Tokyo, Empire of Japan (present-day Japan) (d. 2020)
  - Lawrence Halprin, American architect, best known for his design work for the grounds at Ghirardelli Square in San Francisco and the Century 21 Exposition in Seattle; in New York City, United States (d. 2009)
  - Bob Prince, American sportscaster, best known for sports commentary for the Pittsburgh Pirates; as Robert Ferris Prince, in Los Angeles, United States (d. 1985)
  - Iosif Shklovsky, Ukrainian astrophysicist, best known for his theory and search for extraterrestrial life, co-author of Intelligent Life in the Universe with Carl Sagan; in Hlukhiv, Russian Empire (present-day Ukraine) (d. 1985)
  - Robert Stanford Tuck, British air force officer, commander of the 257 Squadron during World War II, recipient of the Distinguished Service Order and Distinguished Flying Cross; in Catford, London, England (d. 1987)

== July 2, 1916 (Sunday) ==
- Battle of Albert – British forces captured the village of Fricourt along with 1,625 German prisoners, but at a cost of 8,791 casualties over 48 hours.
- Battle of Erzincan – Russian forces under command of Nikolai Yudenich launched counterattacks against the Ottoman Third Army at Erzincan in what is now Turkey.
- Baranovichi Offensive – Three corps with the Russian 4th Army attempted the first of four attacks against Central Powers around Baranovichi in what is now Belarus, but saw the offense stall by the second day.
- Born:
  - Ken Curtis, American actor, best known for the role of Festus Haggen in the long-running TV Western Gunsmoke; as Curtis Wain Gates, in Lamar, Colorado, United States (d. 1991)
  - Barry Gray, American radio broadcaster, considered the "Father of Talk Radio"; as Bernard Yaroslaw, in Red Lion, New Jersey, United States (d. 1996)
  - Hans-Ulrich Rudel, German fighter pilot, member of the Luftwaffe during World War II with over 800 confirmed destroyed enemy vehicles and weapons, recipient of the Knight's Cross of the Iron Cross; in Konradswaldau, German Empire (present-day Poland) (d. 1982)

== July 3, 1916 (Monday) ==
- Battle of Albert – British forces captured parts of La Boisselle and Ovillers from the Germans.
- At the Battle of Guayacanas in the Dominican Republic, the United States Marine Corps ultimately defeated Dominican troops and captured Santiago de los Caballeros after their 800 men were held back by 80 Dominican men, for a considerable time given the disparity. The Dominican side lost 27 men.
- Born: John Kundla, American basketball coach, coached for Minneapolis Lakers from 1947 to 1960 before the team moved and became the Los Angeles Lakers, and Minnesota Golden Gophers men's basketball team from 1959 to 1968; in Star Junction, Pennsylvania, United States (d. 2017)
- Died:
  - Hetty Green, 81, American financier, nicknamed "Witch of Wall Street" for both her financial successes in real estate, railroad investments and loans, as well as her legendary miserliness that earned her an entry in the Guinness Book of World Records (b. 1834)
  - Alfred Kleiner, 67, Swiss physicist, doctoral adviser of Albert Einstein (b. 1849)

== July 4, 1916 (Tuesday) ==
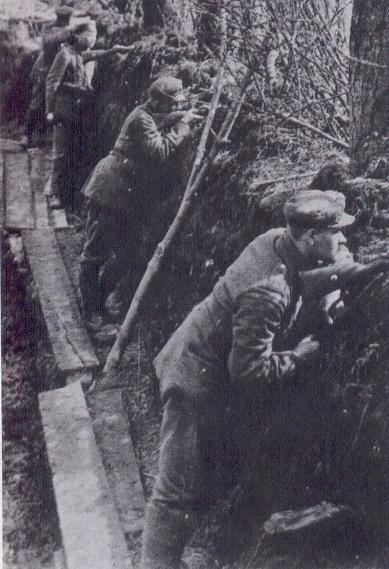
Entrenched Polish troops at the Battle of Kostiuchnówka

- Battle of Mecca – The last resisting Ottoman garrison in Mecca surrendered to Arab forces after three weeks of fighting.
- Battle of Kostiuchnówka – The Imperial Russian Army and Polish Legions allied with the Austria-Hungary clashed at the village of Kostiuchnówka in Galicia (now Ukraine).
- McCormick's Creek State Park was established in Owen County, Indiana.
- According to legend, the first Nathan's Hot Dog Eating Contest was held at Nathan's Famous original location on Coney Island with four competitors (the winners of the contest varied from differing accounts).
- Born:
  - Daniel Webster Cluff, American naval officer, best known for leading the daring SS Pendleton and SS Fort Mercer rescues in the 1950s; in Chincoteague, Virginia, United States (d. 1989)
  - George Hunt, British naval officer, commander of the British submarine HMS Ultor which sank the most enemy vessels during World War II, recipient of the Distinguished Service Order; in Milton of Campsie, Scotland (d. 2011)
  - Iva Toguri D'Aquino, American radio broadcaster, known as Japanese propaganda broadcaster "Tokyo Rose" during World War II; as Iva Ikuko Toguri, in Los Angeles, United States (d. 2006)
  - Naseem Banu, Indian film actress, best known for lead roles in Khoon Ka Khoon and Pukar; as Roshan Ara Begum, in Delhi, British India (present-day India) (d. 2002)
- Died: Alan Seeger, 28, American poet and soldier, uncle to folk singer Pete Seeger; killed in action at the Battle of the Somme (b. 1888)

== July 5, 1916 (Wednesday) ==
- A hurricane in the Gulf of Mexico killed 34 people and caused $3 million in crop and property damage for Florida, Alabama, Mississippi, and Tennessee.
- Shinano Railway extended the Ōito Line in the Nagano Prefecture, Japan, with station Shinano-Ōmachi serving the line.
- Born: Ivor Powell, Welsh association football player and manager, played for the Queens Park Rangers from 1937 to 1948 and the Wales national football team from 1946 to 1950, manager for various clubs including Carlisle United; in Bargoed, Wales (d. 2012)

== July 6, 1916 (Thursday) ==
- At the Battle of Albert, the British had complete control over La Boisselle, but at a loss of 9,850 casualties.
- At the Battle of Kostiuchnówka, Russia broke through the line, forcing the Polish Legions and supporting Hungarian troops to retreat, with the Poles enduring 2,000 casualties.
- British submarine HMS E26 was lost in the North Sea with all 30 crew.
- The United States Army activated the 33rd Infantry Regiment to protect the Panama Canal.
- Died:
  - Odilon Redon, 76, French painter, member of the Symbolism movement, recipient of the Legion of Honour (b. 1840)
  - Béla Békessy, 40, Hungarian fencer, silver medalist at the 1912 Olympic Games; killed in action in Ukraine (b. 1875)

== July 7, 1916 (Friday) ==
- German submarine SM U-77 disappeared while on a mining mission in the North Sea. It was likely she sank after an accident with all 33 crew lost.
- The New Zealand Labour Party was founded in Wellington.
- The World Socialist Party of the United States was established by defecting members of the Detroit chapter of the Socialist Party of America.
- Born:
  - Steve "Pablo" Davis, American artist, member of the Diego Rivera team that produce the Detroit Industry mural; as Paul Meier Klienbordt, in Philadelphia, United States (d. 2013)
  - Herbert Täschner, German politician, general secretary of the Liberal Democratic Party of Germany in East Germany from 1950 to 1954; in Dresden, German Empire (present-day Germany) (d. 1984)
  - Joe Robbie, American sports executive, first owner of the Miami Dolphins; as Joseph Robbie, in Sisseton, South Dakota, United States (d. 1990)
- Died: Dick Thomas, 35, Welsh rugby player, played back for Glamorgan from 1904 to 1914 and the Wales national rugby union team from 1906 to 1909; killed in action at the Battle of the Somme) (b. 1883)

== July 8, 1916 (Saturday) ==
- Baranovichi Offensive – After two previous stalls, the Russian Fourth Army launched a third attack against the Germans under the cover of night but were repulsed.
- Russian hospital ship Vpered was torpedoed by German sub SM U-38 in the Black Sea, killing seven people.
- Born: Jean Rouverol, American screenwriter, blacklisted in the 1950s, screenwriter for The Legend of Lylah Clare; in St. Louis, United States (d. 2017)
- Died:
  - Augustin Cochin, 39, French historian, major author on the French Revolution; killed in action during the Battle of the Somme (b. 1876)
  - Edwin Henry Egerton, 74, British diplomat, ambassador to Greece, Spain and Italy from 1892 to 1908 (b. 1841)

== July 9, 1916 (Sunday) ==
- Battle of Verdun – The Germans began their assault of Fort Souville southeast of the Fleury-devant-Douaumont commune using gas, French soldiers with new gas masks that prevented numerous gas-related casualties.
- Arab Revolt – Arab forces loyal to Hussein bin Ali took control of the holy city of Mecca.
- Argentine president Victorino de la Plaza was nearly assassinated during a military parade inspection on the centennial of Argentina's independence.
- The governing sports organization CONMEBOL for all of South American association football was established on the centennial Independence Day for Argentina, under the initiative of Héctor Rivadavia Gómez, director of the Uruguayan Football Association.
- Born:
  - Edward Heath, British state leader, Prime Minister of the United Kingdom from 1970 to 1974; in Broadstairs, Kent, England (d. 2005)
  - Elmer Bischoff, American artist, member of the Bay Area Figurative Movement in San Francisco; in Berkeley, California, United States (d. 1991)

== July 10, 1916 (Monday) ==
- Battle of Albert – British forces captured the French commune of Contalmaison at an estimated cost of 12,000 casualties compared to 4,000 lost on the German side.
- Born: Hubert Ogunde, Nigerian stage actor playwright, founder of Ogunde Theater; in Ogun State, Nigeria (d. 1990)
- Died: Denys Dobson, 35, English rugby player, played for the England national rugby union team in 1902 to 1903; gored to death by charging rhinoceros (b. 1880)

== July 11, 1916 (Tuesday) ==
- Battle of Verdun – German infantry began a direct assault on Fort Souville in France.
- U.S. President Woodrow Wilson signed the Federal Aid Road Act, which introduced the first federal funding to build interstate highways.
- The village of Milk River, Alberta was established.
- Born:
  - Alexander Prokhorov, Australian-Russian physicist, recipient for the Nobel Prize in Physics for his pioneering research on lasers; as Alexander Michael Prochoroff, in Atherton, Queensland, Australia (d. 2002)
  - Reg Varney, English actor, best known for his television roles on The Rag Trade and On the Buses; as Reginald Alfred Varney, in Canning Town, London, England (d. 2008)
  - Kitty O'Brien Joyner, American engineer, first woman to work for NASA; as Kitty Wingfield O'Brien, in Charlottesville, Virginia, United States (d. 1993)
  - Gough Whitlam, Australian state leader, 21st Prime Minister of Australia; as Edward Gough Whitlam, in Melbourne, Australia (d. 2014)
  - Mortimer Caplin, American lawyer, served as Commissioner of Internal Revenue under the John F. Kennedy administration; in New York City, United States (d. 2019)
- Died: Dan Patch, 20, American racehorse, set the world record in 1905 for fastest miles run by a horse while in a harness at (1:55 1/4 – 1 minute, 55 1/4 seconds), which remained unbroken for 30 years (b. 1896)

== July 12, 1916 (Wednesday) ==
- Battle of Albert – The British captured Mametz Wood in France at a cost of c. 4,000 casualties..
- Battle of Verdun – German soldiers reach the top of Fort Souville in France.
- American cruiser USS North Carolina launched a Curtiss flying boat piloted by Lieutenant Godfrey Chevalier using a catapult, becoming the first ship to do so while underway.
- Imperial Trans-Antarctic Expedition – A third attempt to rescue the main body of the stranded British polar expedition party on Elephant Island following the sinking of the polar ship Endurance was made by the British schooner Emma but the packed ice prevented the ship from nearing the island.
- Cesare Battisti and Fabio Filzi, both Austrian subjects but exponents of Italian irredentism, were hanged by the Austrians in Trento. They had enlisted in the Italian army and were captured by the Austrians, who condemned them as deserters.
- Tennis player Molla Bjurstedt defeated Louise Hammond Raymond 6–0, 6–1 in the women's singles final at the U.S. National Championships hosted by Philadelphia Cricket Club in Chestnut Hill, Pennsylvania.
- The first part of the Nyon–St-Cergue–Morez Railway was completed in Switzerland.
- Born: Lyudmila Pavlichenko, Ukrainian sniper, one of the top Soviet snipers during World War II with 309 kills and one of the most successful female snipers in history, two-time recipient of the Order of Lenin and Hero of the Soviet Union; as Lyudmila Mikhailovna Belova, in Bila Tserkva, Russian Empire (present-day Ukraine) (d. 1974)
- Died: Johnny Williams, 34, Welsh rugby player, Triple Crown champion with the Wales national rugby union team from 1906 to 1911, as well as playing wing for Cardiff; killed in action at the Battle of the Somme (b. 1882)

== July 13, 1916 (Thursday) ==
- Battle of Albert – The first two weeks of the Battle of the Somme ended with a further 25,000 British casualties, 17,600 French casualties, and German casualties ranging between 40,187 and 46,315.
- Vivian Walsh became the first New Zealander to obtain a pilot's licence while a resident in New Zealand.
- Born: M. C. Richards, American poet and artist, author of Centering: in Pottery, Poetry and the Person; as Mary Caroline Richards, in Weiser, Idaho, United States (d. 1999)

== July 14, 1916 (Friday) ==
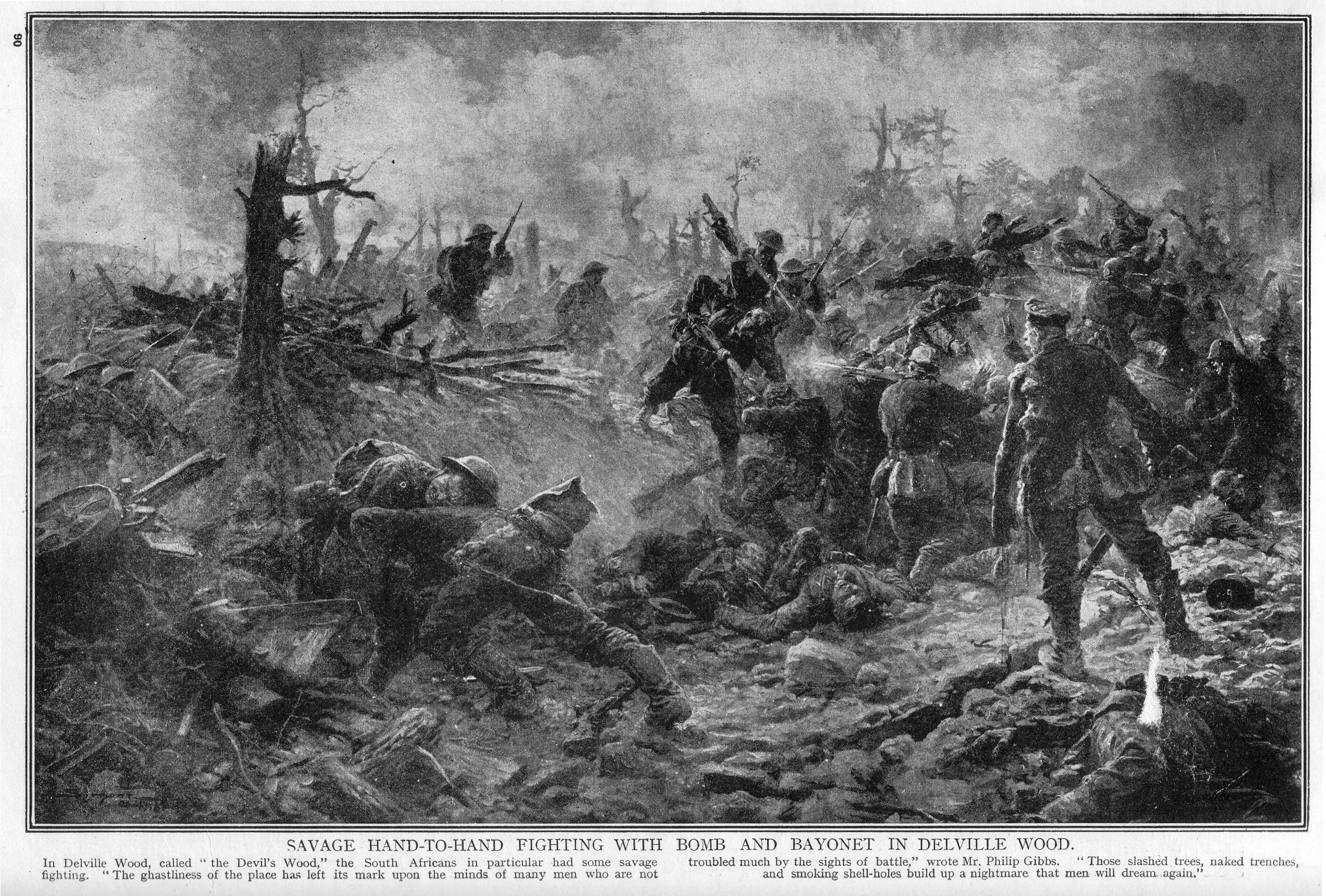
Fighting in Delville Wood

- Battle of Albert – The British captured Trônes Wood in France from the Germans at a cost of 3,837 men. The same day, British, Indian and South African forces under command of General Henry Rawlinson began their assault of the German-held positions at Bazentin Ridge and Delville Wood in France.
- Baranovichi Offensive – The German Ninth Army launched counterattacks against Russia in Belarus and gained back nearly all the ground lost in previous assaults.
- The National Protection War ended in China, with all rebelling Chinese provinces rescinding their independence.
- A hurricane made landfall in North and South Carolina, causing heavy flooding that killed around 80 people and caused an estimated $15-$20 million in damages.
- British submarine HMS H5 sank German U-boat SM U-51 with the loss of 34 of her crew (four survivors were rescued).
- U.S. Navy collier USS Hector ran aground off the Atlantic coast and sank three days later, after all 142 crew members on board were rescued.
- The Royal Flying Corps established the No. 41 Squadron with a nucleus of pilots from the 27 Reserve Squadron.
- The King Edward Memorial Hospital for Women was established in Subiaco, Western Australia, Australia to handle pregnancy and infant care for female patients.
- German poet Hugo Ball recited the first Dada manifesto at a public soiree in Waag Hall, Zürich.(see text).
- Born:
  - Natalia Ginzburg, Italian author, known for works such as Family Sayings and Caro Michele; as Natalia Levi, in Palermo, Kingdom of Italy (present-day Italy) (d. 1991)
  - Sukarni, Indonesian politician, one of the major leaders of Indonesian independence; as Sukarni Kartodiwirjo, in Blitar, Dutch East Indies (present-day Indonesia) (d. 1971)

== July 15, 1916 (Saturday) ==
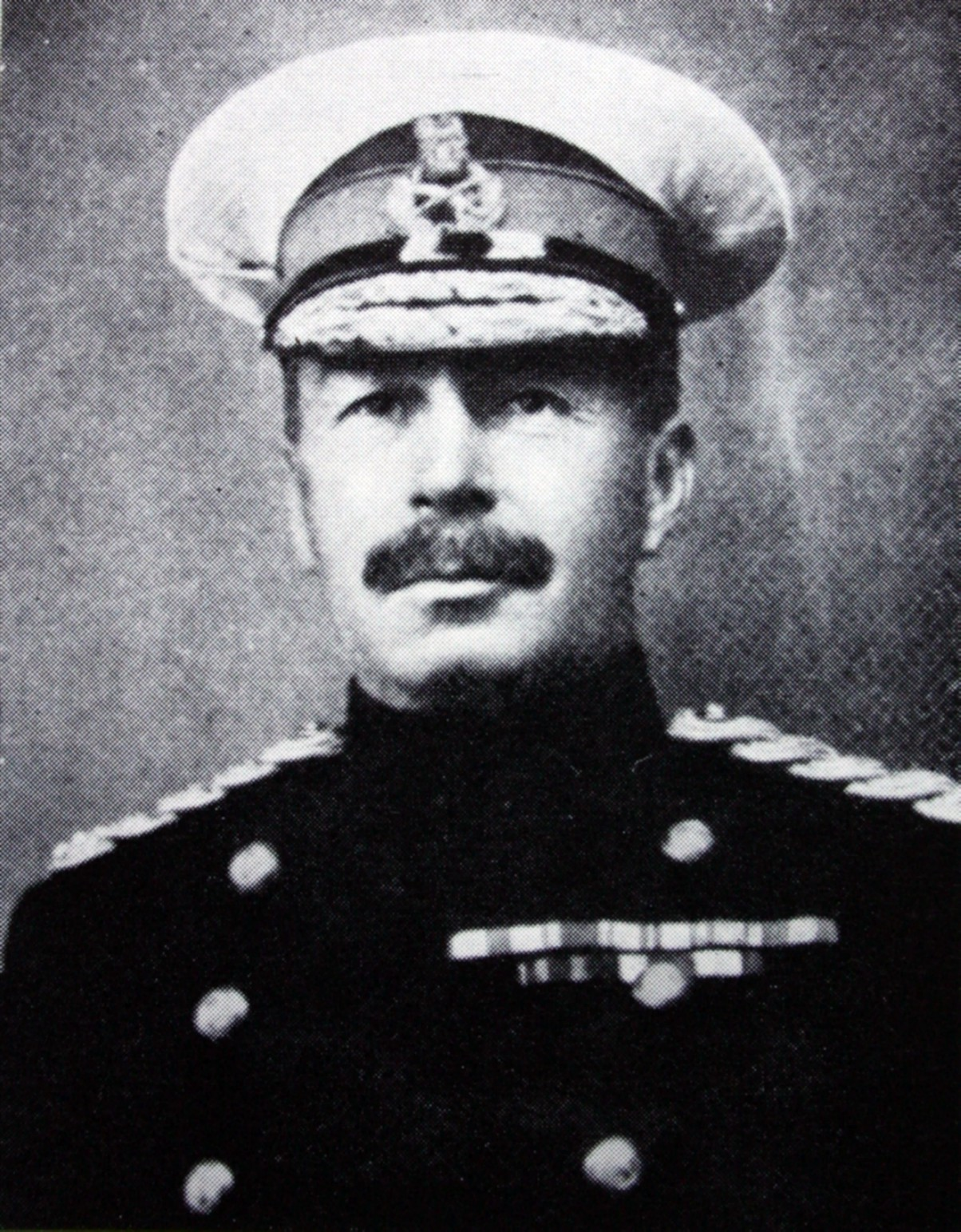
Brigadier-General Henry Lukin, commander of the 1st South African Brigade.

- Battle of Delville Wood – The 1st South African Brigade under command of Brigadier-General Henry Lukin were ordered to take Delville Wood "at all cost", resulting in South Africa sustaining its biggest loss of men in World War I when 766 soldiers in the brigade were killed in a single day's fighting.
- Battle of Verdun – The Germans gave up on taking Fort Souville and retreated to their start lines.
- British submarine HMS H3 struck a mine and sank in the Adriatic Sea.
- William E. Boeing founded the Pacific Aero Products Company in Seattle. It would be renamed the Boeing Airplane Company in 1917.
- Ross Sea party – The surviving three members of the sledging party for the second arm of the Imperial Trans-Antarctic Expedition — Ernest Wild, brother of Frank Wild of the expedition party under Ernest Shackleton, Ernest Joyce and Richard W. Richards — reached Cape Evans where they reunited with the four scientists already stationed there. Three members of the party, including expedition leader Aeneas Mackintosh, perished during the sledging trek. The final seven remained marooned at the station in Cape Evans until rescue in January 1917.
- The United States Army activated the 34th Infantry Regiment in El Paso, Texas.
- The 1st Machine-Gun Squadron of New Zealand was formed to serve in the Sinai and Palestine campaign.
- A partial lunar eclipse occurred over the Antarctica while stranded members of the Ross Sea party attempted to cross the sea ice to reach Cape Evans.
- Born:
  - Joseph M. Pettit, American academic, president of Georgia Tech from 1972 to 1986; in Rochester, Minnesota, United States (d. 1986)
  - Stan Sismey, Australian cricketer, batsman for the New South Wales cricket team from 1938 to 1952; as Stanley George Sismey, in Junee, Australia (d. 2009)
- Died: Élie Metchnikoff, 71, Russian microbiologist, recipient of the Nobel Prize in Physiology or Medicine for his discovery of phagocytes and cell-mediated immunity (b. 1845)

== July 16, 1916 (Sunday) ==
- Battle of Delville Wood – Heavy casualties from two days fighting reduced the 1st South African Brigade's ability to take German defense positions, forcing them to retreat back to their lines at Longueval, France.
- Much of the Southern Railway's mainline in North and South Carolina was damaged or destroyed by flooding.
- The city of Blythe, California was established.
- Born:
  - Miles Copeland Jr., American intelligence agent, covert operator for the Middle East, author of The Game Player: Confessions of the CIA's Original Political Operative; in Birmingham, Alabama, United States (d. 1991)
  - John Gallagher, Canadian oil executive, head of Dome Petroleum from 1950 to 1983; in Winnipeg, Canada (d. 1998)
  - Bill Carson, New Zealand cricket player, played for the New Zealand national cricket team from 1937 to 1939 and the Auckland cricket team from 1936 to 1940; as William Nicol Carson, in Gisborne, New Zealand (d. 1944)
- Died: Victor Horsley, 59, British neurosurgeon, leading pioneer of neurosurgery including the co-developer of the Horsley–Clarke apparatus; died of heat stroke and fever (b. 1857)

== July 17, 1916 (Monday) ==
- Battle of Albert – The British captured all of Ovillers, France, with 5,121 casualties.
- Battle of Bazentin Ridge – British forces captured Bazentin Ridge from the Germans but at a loss of 9,194 casualties.
- Battle of Delville Wood – Renewed British and South African attacks on the wood resulted in failure, allowing the Germans to launch nighttime counterattacks that forced most of the South African force from the forward trenches.
- U.S. President Woodrow Wilson signed the Federal Farm Loan Act which allowed for the creation of farm loan boards at all three levels of government to financially assist American farmers.
- Uruguay won the first Copa América association football continental championship after tying with host Argentina in the deciding last match held in Estadio Racing Club in Avellaneda, Argentina.
- The Abraham Lincoln Birthplace National Historical Park was established in LaRue County, Kentucky.
- Born: Henning Brandis, German physician, leading researcher in microbiology and contributor of the 1952 textbook Experimental Bacteriology, grandson of Dietrich Brandis; in Elberfeld, German Empire (present-day Germany) (d. 2004)
- Died: Eugene B. Beaumont, 79, American army officer, recipient of the Medal of Honor for action at the Battle of Selma (b. 1837)

== July 18, 1916 (Tuesday) ==
- Battle of Delville Wood – Relief forces allowed South Africa to slow the German advance and retake some ground lost the day before. By now, fighting had leveled nearly the entire wood into "stumps" and "craters".
- The French air force began having all the metals part of their Morane-Saulnier aircraft painted red to avoid confusion with German Fokker monoplanes, the first time markings were used to identify a type of aircraft.
- Born:
  - L. Patrick Gray, American law enforcer, acting Director of the Federal Bureau of Investigation during the Watergate scandal; as Louis Patrick Gray III, in St. Louis, United States (d. 2005)
  - Hugh John Beazley, British fighter pilot, recipient of the Distinguished Flying Cross for service for the Royal Air Force during World War II; in Cornwall, England (d. 2011)
  - Horace S. Carswell Jr., American air force officer, recipient for the Medal of Honor for his service in Southeast Asia during World War II; in Fort Worth, Texas, United States (killed in action, 1944)
- Died: Eric Milroy, 28, Scottish rugby player, played for the Watsonians from 1906 to 1914 and for the Scotland national rugby union team from 1910 to 1914; killed in action at the Battle of the Somme) (b. 1887)

== July 19, 1916 (Wednesday) ==
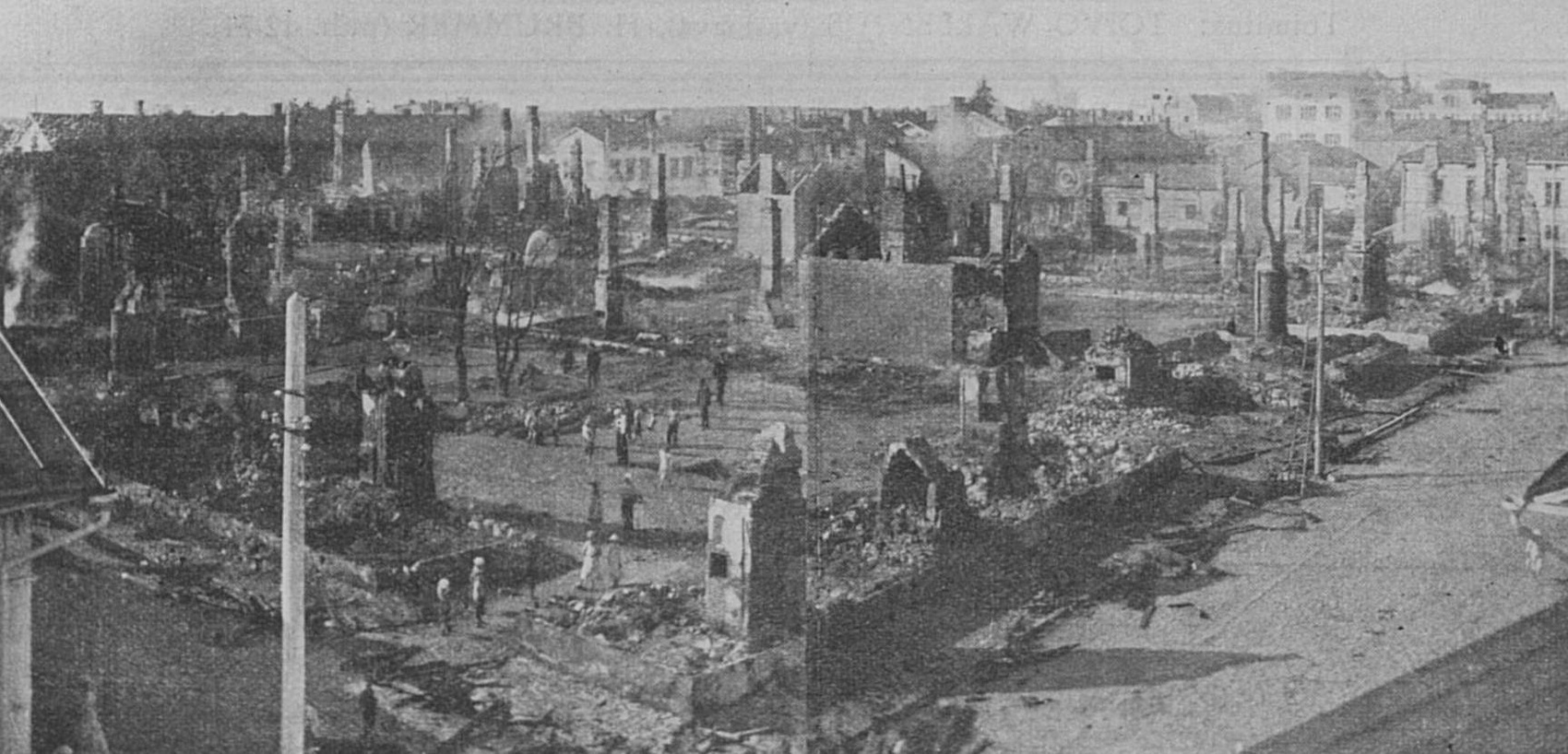
A city block destroyed by fire in Oulu, Finland.

- Attack at Fromelles – The first joint British and Australian operation commenced with General Richard Haking commanding 10,000 to 15,000 troops in an assault of a German defense force of 30,000 near Lille, France.
- Battle of Delville Wood – German forces launched a rear attack on the 3rd South African Battalion, resulting in the capture of six officers and 185 men. The attacks also isolated more pockets of South African troops in the wood, forcing many to surrender over the day.
- A city fire in Oulu, Finland destroyed four city blocks and left 200 people homeless.
- The First Army of the Imperial German Army was reformed for the Battle of the Somme.
- Famous Players Film Company and Jesse L. Lasky Feature Plays merged to form Famous Players–Lasky for movie distribution.
- The Carl Eduard War Cross was established by German noble Charles Edward, the last reigning Duke of the House of Saxe-Coburg and Gotha. The award was to be presented for bravery or merit in combat regardless of rank but was only awarded 97 times before World War I ended, making it one of the rarest of the German WWI military decorations.
- Born:
  - Phil Cavarretta, American baseball player, played first base and outfielder for the Chicago Cubs from 1934 to 1955; as Philip Joseph Cavarretta, in Chicago, United States (d. 2010)
  - Bill Goldfinch, British air force pilot, best known for attempting to escape the German POW camp Oflag IV-C using a handmade glider; in Whitstable, England (d. 2007)
  - James D. Ramage, American naval air force officer, leading developer of modern aircraft carrier operations including modeling to be nuclear-powered, recipient of the Navy Cross; in Waterloo, Iowa, United States (d. 2012)

== July 20, 1916 (Thursday) ==
- Attack at Fromelles – An attack by Australian and British troops was repulsed by the German army with heavy casualties. including the heaviest single-day casualties for Australia in World War I with 5,513 casualties out of 7,080 sustained overall.
- Battle of Delville Wood – British relief forces were able to secure an escape route for the remaining 1st South African Brigade out of Delville Wood, with total casualties numbered at 2,536 men. At the same time, German forces repelled an attack by the French Sixth Army to recapture the village of Barleux, France, inflicting 2,000 casualties.
- Attacks on High Wood – British forces pushed into a wood near the French commune of Bazentin to forestall any German counterattacks following the capture of Bazentin Ridge the day before.
- Lake View Store, the first indoor shopping mall in the United States, opened in Duluth, Minnesota.
- Born: Harold McMaster, American inventor, holder of over 100 patents including the McMaster rotary engine and tempered glass; in Perrysburg, Ohio, United States (d. 2003)
- Died:
  - Reinhard Sorge, 24, German dramatist and poet, member of the German Expressionism movement, recipient of the Kleist Prize for his play The Beggar; killed in action at the Battle of the Somme (b. 1892)
  - Herbert Bolt, 22, Australian rugby player, played for the Newtown Bluebags from 1912 to 1915; killed in action at Fleurbaix, France (b. 1893)
  - Billy Congreve, 25, British soldier, recipient of the Victoria Cross; killed in action at Longueval, France (b. 1891)

== July 21, 1916 (Friday) ==
- Battle of Delville Wood – The British launched a renewed offensive to take Delville Wood but were repelled by strong German defenses.
- Attacks on High Wood – German artillery barrages stalled the British advance to the north end of the wood.
- German flying ace Otto Parschau was mortally wounded by aircraft fire from British pilot John Oliver Andrews over Grévillers, France. Parschau was able to land his plane and was rushed to hospital where he died from his wounds.
- Born: Wilfred Cantwell Smith, Canadian academic, leading researcher in comparative religious studies, author of The Meaning and End of Religion; in Toronto, Canada (d. 2000)

== July 22, 1916 (Saturday) ==
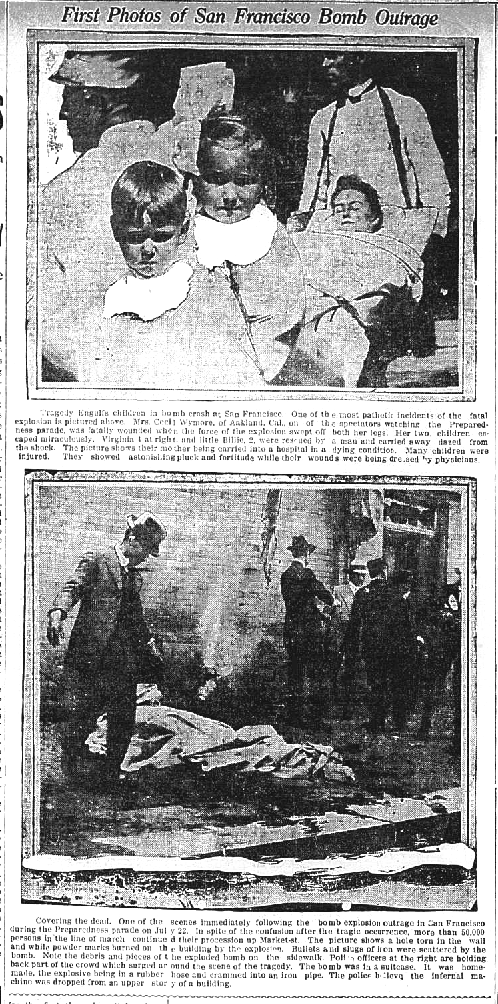
Newspaper photos of the victims killed or wounded during a parade bombing in San Francisco.

- A bomb exploded on Market Street during a Preparedness Day parade in San Francisco, killing 10 people and injuring another 40. Labor leaders Warren Billings and Thomas Mooney were later wrongly convicted of the attack.
- The first edition of "Der Kriegsbote" (The War Envoy) was published as a daily German-language newspaper for German South West Africa. It would eventually become Allgemeine Zeitung, the oldest-running newspaper of Namibia and the only German-language newspaper in Africa.
- The Austro-Hungarian steamship Carola sank during a foggy night off Cape Đerane near Ulcinj after being hit by the Austro-Hungarian steamship Mátyás Király belonging to the same company.
- Born:
  - Marcel Cerdan, French boxer, middleweight world champion in 1948, famous for his affair with Édith Piaf; as Marcellin Cerdan, in Sidi Bel Abbès, French Algeria (present-day Algeria) (killed in a plane crash, 1949)
  - William Harper, British-Rhodesian politician, founding member of the Rhodesian Front, cabinet member for the Winston Field and Ian Smith administrations; in Calcutta, British India (present-day Kolkata, India) (d. 2006)
  - Ron Middleton, Australian fighter pilot, recipient of the Victoria Cross for action in Italy during World War II; in Sydney, Australia (killed in action, 1942)
- Died:
  - James Whitcomb Riley, 66, American poet, best known for his poems written for children including "Little Orphant Annie" and "The Raggedy Man" (b. 1849)
  - John Pitcairn Jr., 75, Scottish-born American industrialist, founder of the Pittsburgh Plate Glass Company (now PPG Industries) (b. 1841)
  - Edgar Albert Smith, 68, British biologist, leading expert on mollusks and responsible for discovery of new species brought back from polar expeditions (b. 1847)

== July 23, 1916 (Sunday) ==
- Battle of Pozières – The Australian 1st Division captured the French village of Pozières on the first day of the joint British-Australian offense against the Germans. On the first day, Australian soldiers Arthur Blackburn and John Leak earned the Victoria Cross for their separate actions during the battle.
- Attacks on High Wood – British attacks to capture the entire wood ended in failure, with 450 casualties.
- Thousands attended an open-air meeting at the Phoenix Park in Dublin to discuss the British government's Irish partition proposals. It is the first open-air meeting since martial law was proclaimed during the Easter Rising.
- A peace demonstration organized by Scottish labor leader Helen Crawfurd was held in Glasgow with 5,000 in attendance. The event lead to further action and the formation of The Women's Peace Crusade.
- Born: Sandra Gould, American actress, best known for the role of Gladys Kravitz in Bewitched; in New York City, United States (d. 1999)
- Died: William Ramsay, 63, Scottish chemist, recipient of the Nobel Prize in Chemistry for his discovery of noble gases (b. 1852)

== July 24, 1916 (Monday) ==
- Battle of Pozières – Australian forces assaulted a second network of German trenches known as the O.G. Lines just east of Pozières, France.
- Battle of Kowel – Austrian forces under command of Alexander von Linsingen counterattacked Russian forces south of the city of Kowel in what is now modern Ukraine in an attempt turn back the Brusilov Offensive launched in June.
- Canadian rodeo cowboy Earl W. Bascom entered his first steer riding contest at Welling, Alberta and later becomes an international celebrity in the rodeo and fine art worlds. He was known as the first rodeo cowboy to become a professional cowboy artist and sculptor and the first cowboy artist to be honored as a Fellow of the Royal Society of Arts of London, England.
- Born:
  - Sheila Florance, Australian actress, best known for her work with the Australian TV soap opera Prisoner; in St Kilda, Victoria, Australia (d. 1991)
  - John D. MacDonald, American writer, best known for his thrillers including The Executioners, in which the film Cape Fear was based on, and the Travis McGee series; in Sharon, Pennsylvania, United States (d. 1986)
  - Isabel Pérez Farfante, Cuban-born American biologist, leading expert on prawns, first female Cuban to earn a doctorate from an Ivy League school; in Havana, Cuba (d. 2009)
  - Fred Hall, American politician, 33rd Governor of Kansas; as Frederick Lee Hall, in Dodge City, Kansas, United States (d. 1970)
  - Louis R. Lowery, American army officer and war photographer, photographed the first raising of the American flag on Iwo Jima; in Pittsburgh, United States (d. 1987)

== July 25, 1916 (Tuesday) ==
- Battle of Erzincan – Russian forces smashed the Ottoman Third Army at Erzincan, Turkey. killing or capturing 34,000 Ottoman troops and rendering the army unfit for combat to the rest of year.
- Baranovichi Offensive – Russia launched a fourth and final assault against the Germans.
- Battle of Pozières – The Australian 1st Division was caught between friendly and offensive fire in Pozières, resulting in 5,285 casualties. One of the casualties was Thomas Cooke, who as awarded posthumously the Victoria Cross for his brave actions during the first days of the battle.
- The North of Scotland Special Military Area was declared, restricting access by non-residents to everywhere north of the Great Glen in Scotland. Other areas in Great Britain designated for restricted travel later in the year included Isle of Sheppey (7 September), Newhaven, East Sussex (22 September), Harwich (27 September), Dover (6 October) and Spurn.
- Born:
  - Fred Lasswell, American cartoonist, known for his comic strip Barney Google and Snuffy Smith; in Kennett, Missouri, United States (d. 2001)
  - Thomas Leighton Decker, Sierra Leonean linguist, known for his research and advocate for the Krio language of Sierra Leone; in Calabar, Nigeria (d. 1978)
- Died:
  - Henry Hildyard, 70, British army officer, General Officer Commander-in-Chief of South Africa from 1905 to 1908 (b. 1846)
  - Sarah Broom Macnaughtan, 51, Scottish writer, wrote accounts of the Armenian genocide while with the Red Cross (b. 1864)
  - Maria Alexandrovna Ulyanova, 81, Russian matriarch, mother to Vladimir Lenin (b. 1835)

== July 26, 1916 (Wednesday) ==
- Battle for Lake Tanganyika – With German colonial forces losing ground on land and likely risking the loss of the German-controlled lake port of Kigoma, General Paul von Lettow-Vorbeck ordered marine engineers to scuttle the steamship Graf von Goetzen. The loss of the last of three German ships built to control Lake Tanganyika in Central Africa allowed the Allies control of the largest body of water in the continent.
- Roger Casement was found guilty of high treason for this role in the Easter Rising and sentenced for execution on August 3.
- The New South Wales Rugby Football League premiership culminated in a grand final victory to the Balmain Tigers.
- The Woodman Institute Museum was opened in Dover, New Hampshire, and was listed on the National Register of Historic Places in 1980
- Died: Henry Charlick, 71, Australian chess player, winner of the Australian Chess Championship in 1887 (b. 1845)

== July 27, 1916 (Thursday) ==
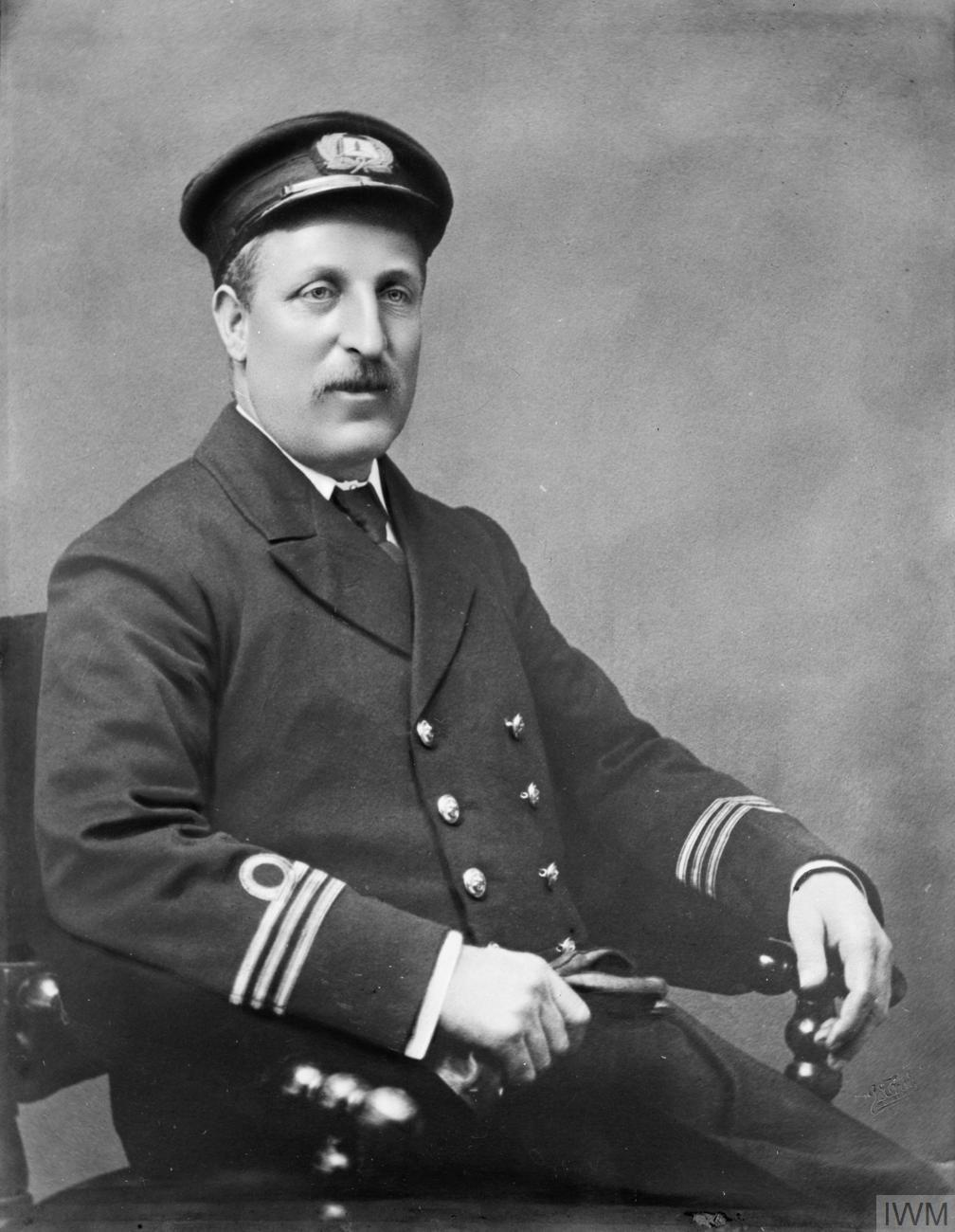
Captain Charles Fryatt, executed by the Imperial German Navy.

- Battle of Delville Wood – A massive artillery barrage by the British destroyed much of the German defenses in Delville Wood, with patrols describing "a horrible scene of chaos and destruction". Despite horrific losses, German forces recovered and launched a counter-assault on the eastern side of the wood.
- Battle of Pozières – The Australian 2nd Division relieved Australian 1st Division to push for further attacks on the German line.
- English civilian ferry captain Charles Fryatt was executed at Bruges, Belgium, after a German court-martial condemned him for attempting to ram a U-boat in 1915.
- Maharaja Wadiyar presided over the opening of the University of Mysore, the sixth oldest university in India.
- Born:
  - Amha Selassie, Ethiopian state leader, last Emperor of Ethiopia; as Asfaw Wossen Tafari, in Harar, Ethiopian Empire (present-day Ethiopia) (d. 1997)
  - Elizabeth Hardwick, American literary critic and novelist, co-founder of The New York Review of Books; in Lexington, Kentucky, United States (d. 2007)
  - Keenan Wynn, American actor, known for his character supporting roles in films such as Annie Get Your Gun and The Man in the Gray Flannel Suit; as Francis Xavier Aloysius James Jeremiah Keenan Wynn, in New York City, United States (d. 1986)
  - Rosemary Brown, British composer and spiritualist, purported to have been able to channel the spirits of deceased composers such as Franz Liszt to produce new compositions; as Rosemary Isobel Dickeson, in London, England (d. 2001)
- Died: Daniel Bliss, 92, American missionary, founder of the Syria Protestant College (now the American University of Beirut) (b. 1823)

== July 28, 1916 (Friday) ==
- Battle of Pozières – Australian forces failed to make any gains on the German lines due to intense artillery and machine gun fire.
- Brusilov Offensive – After stalling by weakened attacks around Kowel, Russian general Aleksei Brusilov order a renewed advance to push the Central Powers line back out of Galicia (now Ukraine).
- Austrian composer Arnold Schoenberg completed the fourth orchestral composition of his Four Orchestral Songs that he began in 1913, although they would not be performed publicly until 1932.
- Born:
  - David Brown, American film and stage producer, known for producing Hollywood hits such as The Sting, The Verdict and Driving Miss Daisy; in New York City, United States (d. 2010)
  - Rosina Raisbeck, Australian opera singer, best known for her performances through The Royal Opera; as Phyllis Rosina Raisbeck, in Ballarat, Victoria, Australia (d. 2006)
  - Harry Ashmore, American journalist, recipient of the Pulitzer Prize for his editorials on school racial integration in Arkansas for the Arkansas Gazette; in Greenville, South Carolina, United States (d. 1998)
  - Robert Guthrie, American biologist, developed screening technique for phenylketonuria in infants to prevent neurological damage; in Marionville, Missouri, United States (d. 1995)
- Died: Fanny Ronalds, 76, American socialite, known for her long affair with composer Arthur Sullivan and influence on his composition "The Lost Chord" (b. 1839)

== July 29, 1916 (Saturday) ==
- Baranovichi Offensive – The Russian offensive ended in failure with no new ground recovered, with Russian Fourth Army sustaining 80,000 casualties. The opposing German Ninth Army only lost 13,000 casualties.
- Matheson Fire – A lightning strike ignited a forest fire northwest of North Bay, Ontario that destroyed the towns of Cochrane and Matheson, Ontario, killing 233 people.
- Claud Castleton was killed in the Battle of Pozières and for his actions in bringing back wounded men before and at the time of his death, he was awarded the Victoria Cross.
- Born:
  - Charlie Christian, American jazz musician, best known for his recordings collected for the album Solo Flight: The Genius of Charlie Christian; as Charles Henry Christian, in Bonham, Texas, United States (d. 1942)
  - Budd Boetticher, American film director, best known for his Westerns starring Randolph Scott including Comanche Station; as Oscar Boetticher Jr., in Chicago, United States (d. 2001)
  - Rupert Hamer, Australian politician, 39th Premier of Victoria; in Melbourne, Australia (d. 2004)
- Died: Eleanor Vere Boyle, 91, English illustrator, best known for her illustrations for children's authors and her illustration collections including Child's Play and A Book of the Heavenly Birthdays (b. 1825)

== July 30, 1916 (Sunday) ==
- A revolt of Turkic peoples in Central Asia, including members of the Kyrgyz and Kazakhs, against the Russian Empire at Bedel Pass near the Russian-Chinese international border resulted in at least 3,000 deaths (although some estimates pegged the toll higher at 100,000) and forced tens of thousands to flee into China.
- Battle of Delville Wood – British launched new attacks on the western side of Delville Wood but neither side was able to gain control of the area. A moratorium on major attacks was called that lasted five days.
- German agents destroyed an ammunition depot, known as the Black Tom explosion, in Jersey City, New Jersey that killed at least seven people.
- A solar eclipse occurred over the Antarctic.
- Born: Thyra Thomson, American politician, 16th Secretary of State of Wyoming; as Thyra Godfrey, in Florence, Colorado, United States (d. 2013)
- Died: Albert Ludwig Sigesmund Neisser, 61, German physician, discovered the bacteria that causes gonorrhea (b. 1855)

== July 31, 1916 (Monday) ==
- Battle of the Somme – After a month's fighting, German losses increased to c. 160,000 while Anglo-French casualties were more than 200,000 men.
- Born:
  - Herbert Goodfellow, English rugby player, played halfback for Yorkshire during the Rugby League War of the Roses from 1938 to 1946 and the England national rugby league team in 1939; in Sharlston, England (d. 1997)
  - Brian Inglis, Irish journalist, best known as the news presenter for TV news program All Our Yesterdays; in Dublin, Ireland (d. 1993)
  - Mohan Lal Sukhadia, Indian politician, 5th Chief Minister of Rajasthan; in Jhalawar, British India (present-day India) (d. 1982)
  - Bill Todman, American television producer, partner to Mark Goodson on producing TV game shows Family Feud and The Price Is Right; as William Selden Todman, in New York City, United States (d. 1979)
  - Ethel Wilson Gammon, American educator, founder of the Washburn-Norlands Living History Center; as Ethel Searle Wilson, in Augusta, Maine, United States (d. 2009)
