= List of Russian Fleet hospital ships =

This article is a list of Russian Fleet hospital ships inactive, active, and historical. The purpose of a hospital ship is to provide a floating medical treatment facility, historically redundant warships were used in this role, though in modern navies, ships may be purpose-built for the role.

== Great Northern War (1700–1721) ==
- Perl
- Sankt Peterburg, frigate, 1712
- Straford
- Svyatoy Nikolai, 1715-1717

== Russo-Swedish War (1741–1743) ==
- Novaya Nadezhda
- Riga
- Slava Rossii

== Seven Years' War (1756–1763) ==
- Shlisselburg
- Svyatoy Nikolai
- Uriil (Arhangel Uriil)
- Urtriya

== Russo-Turkish War (1768–74) ==
- Merkuriy
- Nansi
- Nordshteyn
- Panteleymon
- Providenciya

== Russo-Swedish War (1788–90) ==
- Chayka
- Gus'
- Kholmogory
- Turukhtan

== Crimean War (1853–1856) ==
- Chesma, frigate
- Kagul, frigate
- Mariya, ship of the line
- Midiya, frigate
- Rostislav, ship of the line
- Yagudiil, frigate

== Russo-Turkish War (1877–1878) ==
- Imperatritsa Mariya
- Imperator Aleksandr

== Boxer Rebellion (1899–1901) ==
- Tsaritsa

== Russo-Japanese War (1904–1905) ==
- Angara
- Kazan
- Kostroma
- Mongolia
- Orel

== World War I ==
=== Baltic Sea Fleet ===
Ship Name	Vessel Dimensions	Displacement	Service Life
Aura			
Ariadna			
Diana			
Imperator Nikolai II (Tovarishch)			
Joulan			
Lava			
Lakhta			
Mercuriy			
Mitava			
Nikolaev (Narodovolets)			
Nautilus			
Okean (Komsomolets)			
Pallada			
Riga (Transbalt)			
Rus'	Length 144.78 metres (475.0 ft). Width 17.53 metres (57.5 ft). Depth 11.2 metres (37 ft).	8,595 GRT	Launched in 1908, served as a passenger liner before World War I. Survived the war, later being sold to the Japanese.

=== Black Sea Fleet ===
Ship Name	Vessel Dimensions	Displacement	Service life
Equateur			
Imperator Petr Velikiy			
Portugal	Length 140.2 metres (460 ft). Width 14 metres (46 ft).	7,720 metric tons (7,600 long tons; 8,510 short tons)	Built in 1886. Brought into Russian service in 1914, sunk by U-boat in 1916.
Vpered		859 GRT	Built in 1898. Brought into service in 1914, sunk by U-boat in 1916.

== See also ==
- Hospital ship
- List of hospital ships sunk in World War I
