= June 1916 =

Month in 1916

<<	June 1916					>>
Su	Mo	Tu	We	Th	Fr	Sa
				1	2	3
4	5	6	7	8	9	10
11	12	13	14	15	16	17
18	19	20	21	22	23	24
25	26	27	28	29	30

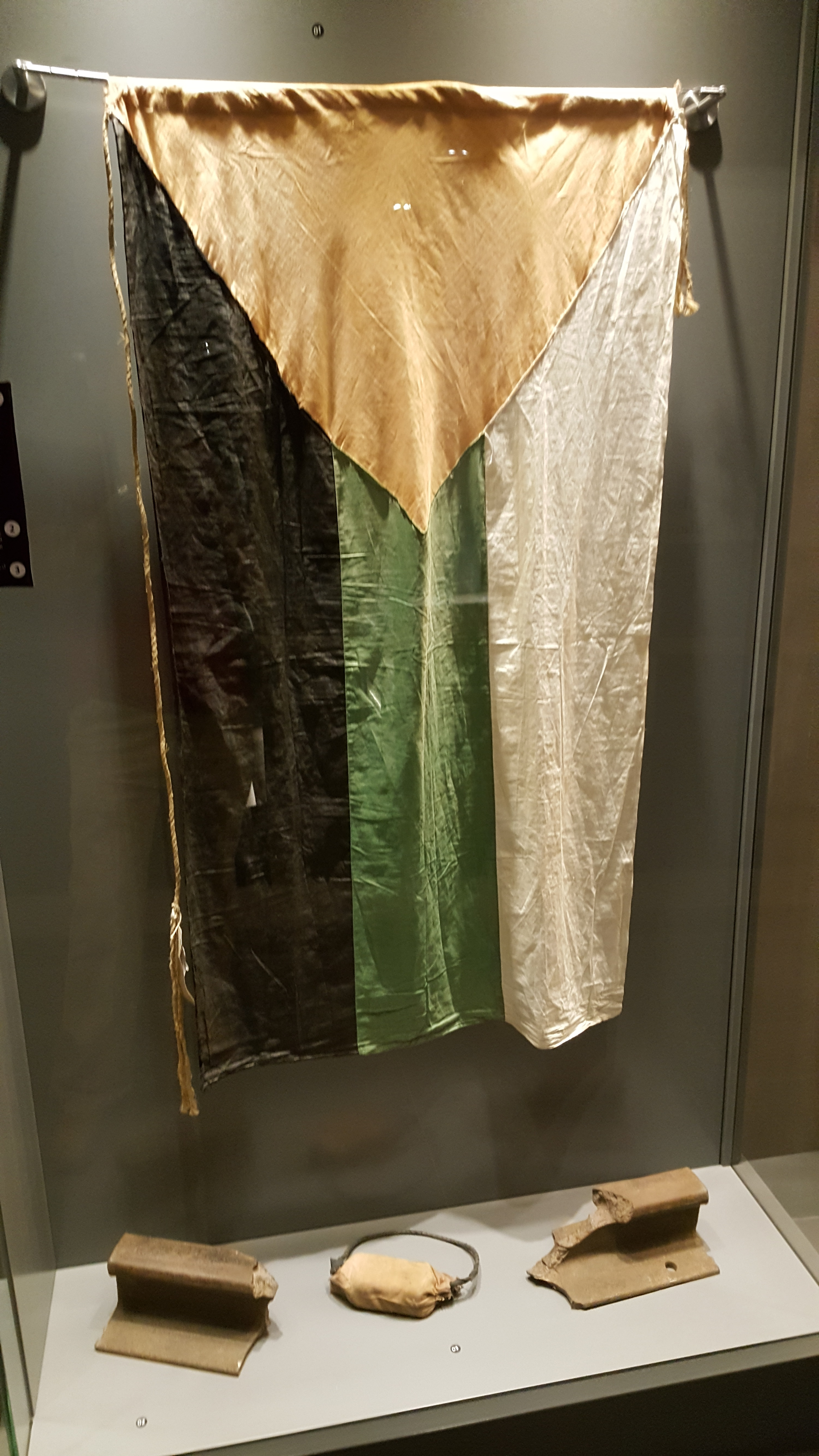
The flag of the Arab Revolt in the Martyrs' Memorial, Amman, Jordan.

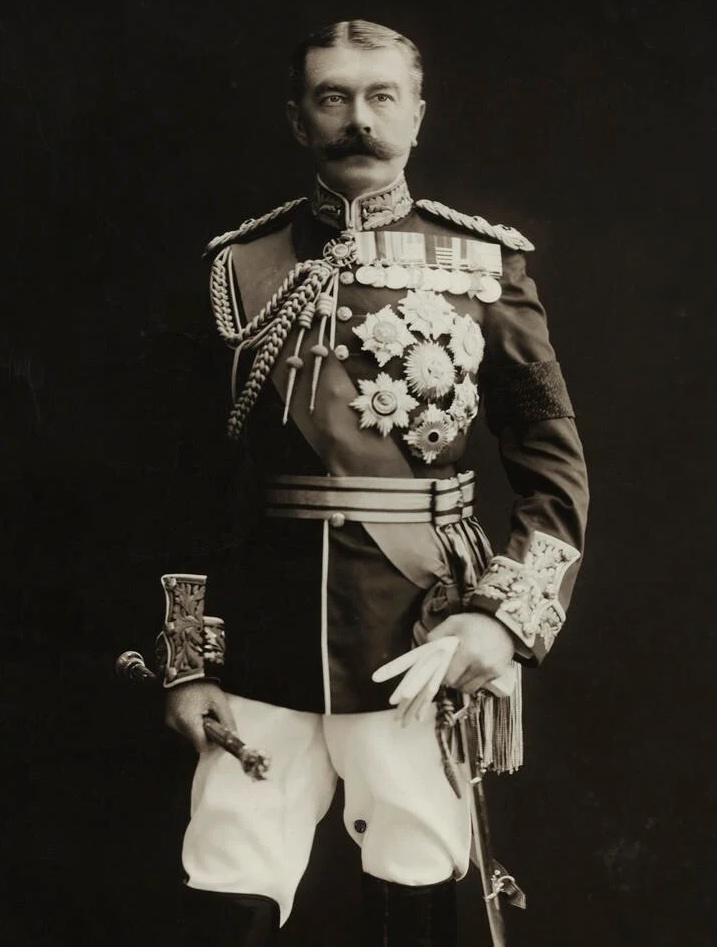
Field Marshal Herbert Kitchener perishes when the battle cruiser HMS Hampshire strikes a mine and sinks off Scotland.

The following events occurred in June 1916:

== June 1, 1916 (Thursday) ==
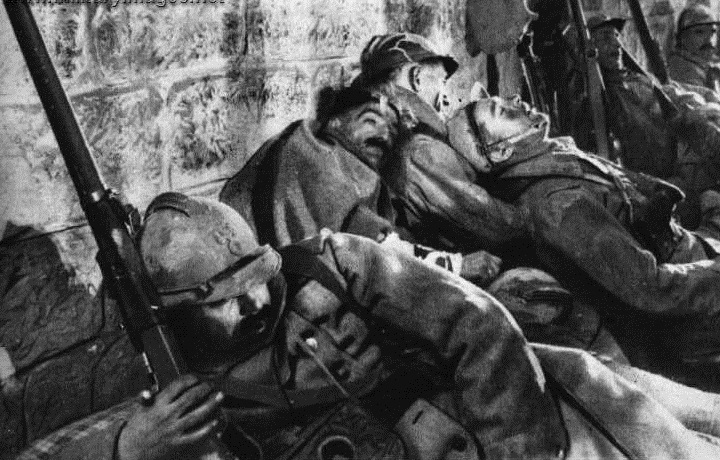
French soldiers resting in between German attacks at Fort Vaux during the Battle of Verdun.

- Battle of Jutland – The British Royal Navy Grand Fleet overcame massive losses in the opening of the battle to rout the Imperial German Navy High Seas Fleet in the North Sea during the night, forcing them to retreat back to home port. Although the British lost more ships, the Germans lost key ships that compromised their naval advantage. The result was tactically inconclusive but allowed the Royal Navy to retain dominance of the North Sea. British casualties were 6,094 and German casualties were 2,551.
  - German cruiser SMS Wiesbaden, sunk by a British barrage with 589 men lost including German poet Johann Kinau, better known by his pseudonym Gorch Fock.
  - German battleship SMS Pommern was shelled and sunk by British barrage with all 839 crew killed.
  - German cruiser SMS Frauenlob was torpedoed by HMS Southampton and sank, taking 320 men down with her.
- The German Navy scuttled cruisers SMS Lützow, SMS Elbing and SMS Rostock as all three were too badly damaged to bring back to port, adding to the 63,300 tons sunk by the Royal Navy.
  - British cruiser HMS Warrior was so badly damaged, it was scuttled. The Royal Navy also lost destroyers HMS Turbulent (90 crew dead), HMS Ardent (78 crew dead), HMS Fortune (67 crew dead), and HMS Sparrowhawk (6 crew dead) which added to the total 113,300 tons sunk by the German navy.
- Battle of Verdun – A German force of 10,000 troops began their assault on Fort Vaux in northeastern France.
- The United States Marine Corps took control of key port cities of Puerto Plata and Monti Cristi in the Dominican Republic to enforce a blockade on the country.
- The United States Senate confirmed the nomination of Louis Brandeis as an Associate Justice of the Supreme Court of the United States by a vote of 47 to 22.
- Born: Rick Fletcher, American comic strip artist, best known for his work on the Dick Tracy comic strip; as Richard Fletcher, in Burlington, Iowa, United States (d. 1983)
- Died:
  - Charles J. Knapp, 70, American banker, indicted in the failure of the Binghamton Trust Company in 1909 (b. 1845)
  - Mason Scott, 50, English rugby player, played half back for the England national rugby union team from 1887 to 1890 and for the Barbarian club (b. 1865)
  - John K. Stewart, 45, American inventor, co-founder of Stewart-Warner and other companies (b. 1870)

== June 2, 1916 (Friday) ==
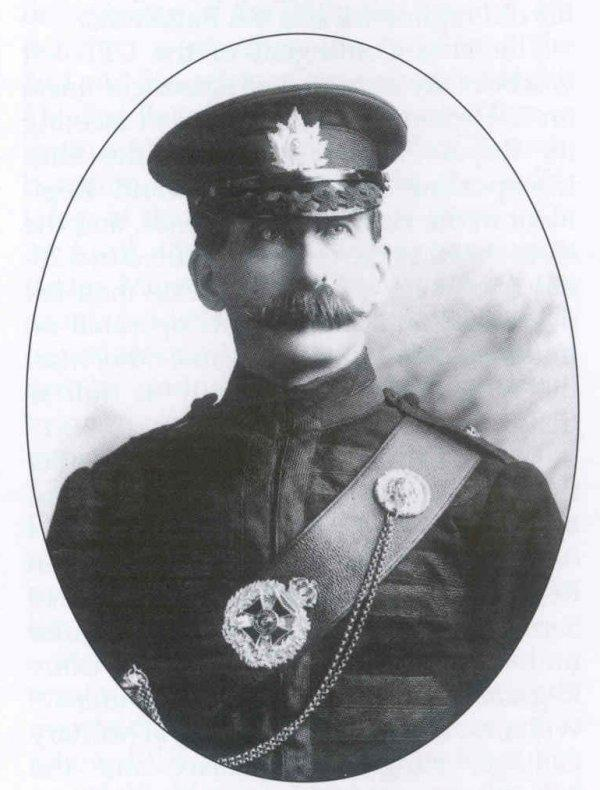
General Malcolm Mercer

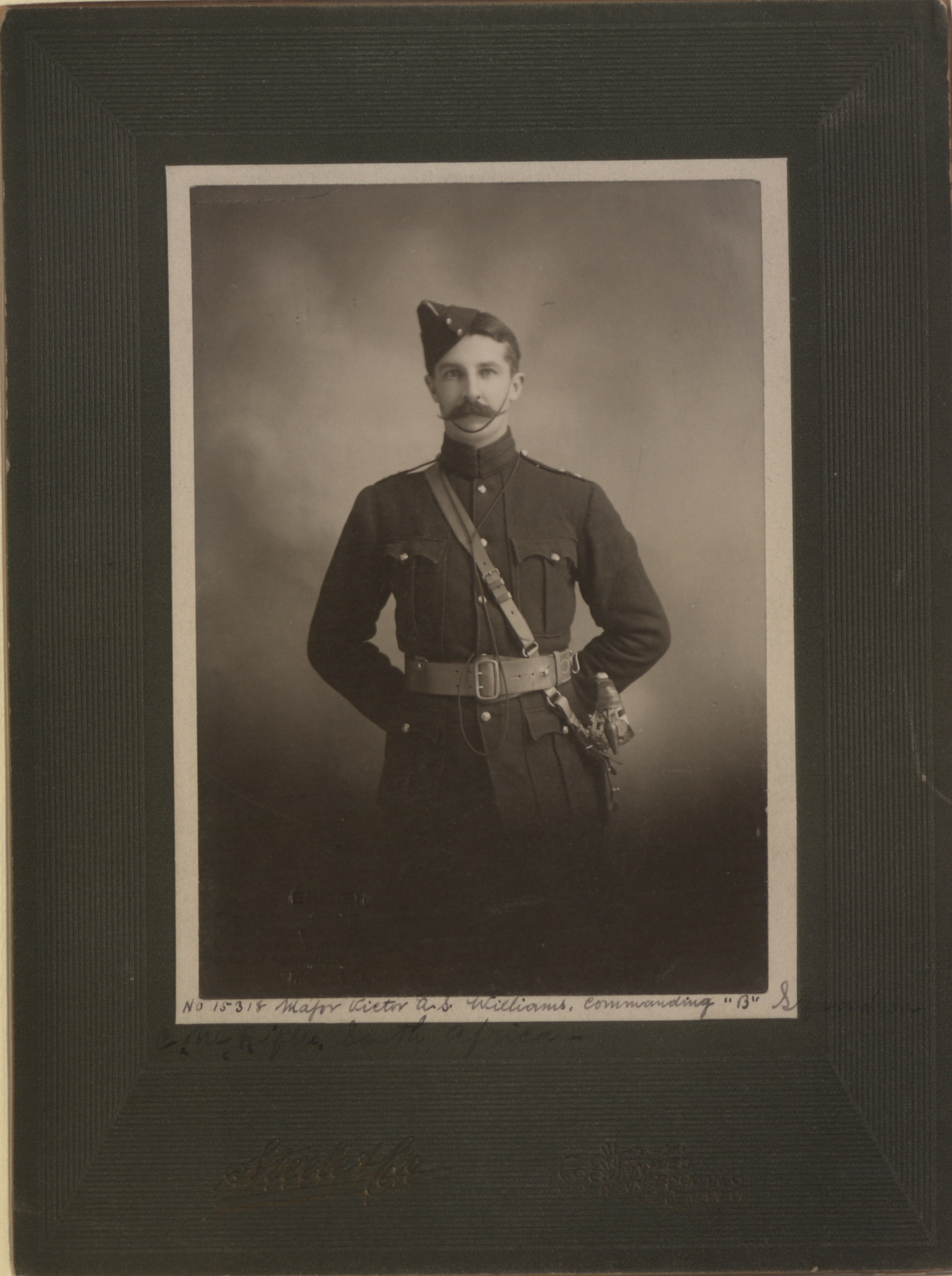
General Victor Williams

- Battle of Mont Sorrel – German artillery shelled the defending Canadian Corps at Mont Sorrel east of Ypres, Belgium, inflicting heavy casualties that included the wounding of commanding officers Major-General Malcolm Mercer and Brigadier-General Victor Williams.
- Battle of Verdun – German forces overrun the top of Fort Vaux in northeastern France but French defenders continue to resist from the underground garrisons.
- British sailor Jack Cornwell, 16, died from wounds received while serving on HMS Chester during Battle of Jutland. He was awarded posthumously the Victoria Cross for his actions, the third-youngest British serviceman to receive the honor.
- Imperial Trans-Antarctic Expedition – News of the sinking of the polar ship Endurance in November 1915 and the attempts by expedition leader Ernest Shackleton to reach civilization and arrange rescue reached the United Kingdom, where it briefly dominated headlines normally reserved for World War I.
- Born:
  - Jozef Cleber, Dutch conductor and composer, known for compositions Heel de wereld and the Indonesian national anthem Indonesia Raya; in Maastricht, Netherlands (d. 1999)
  - George Houser, American activist, co-founder of the Congress of Racial Equality and co-leader of the Journey of Reconciliation action to promote desegregation laws in Southern United States; in Cleveland, United States (d. 2015)

== June 3, 1916 (Saturday) ==
- Battle of Mont Sorrel – The Canadian Corps at Mont Sorrel scrambled to organize a counterattack after losing Major-General Malcolm Mercer, who died from wounds he received during the shelling the previous day, and Brigadier-General Victor Williams, who was wounded and taken prisoner. Organization delays forced the assault to occur in broad daylight, earning more heavy casualties with no lost territory recaptured.
- British passenger ship SS Golconda struck a mine and sank in the North Sea with a loss of 19 lives.
- The U.S. government enacted the National Defense Act, an update to the Militia Act. The legislation expanded the U.S. Army into including an air division, expanded the reorganized the Army's Division of Militia Affairs into the Militia Bureau which federalized the United States National Guard, and created a Reserve Officers' Training Corps.
- Born: Jack Manning, American actor, known for his stage performances of Othello, Man and Superman and his one-man performance of Hamlet on the TV program Monodrama Theater; as Jack Wilson Marks, in Cincinnati, United States (d. 2009)

== June 4, 1916 (Sunday) ==
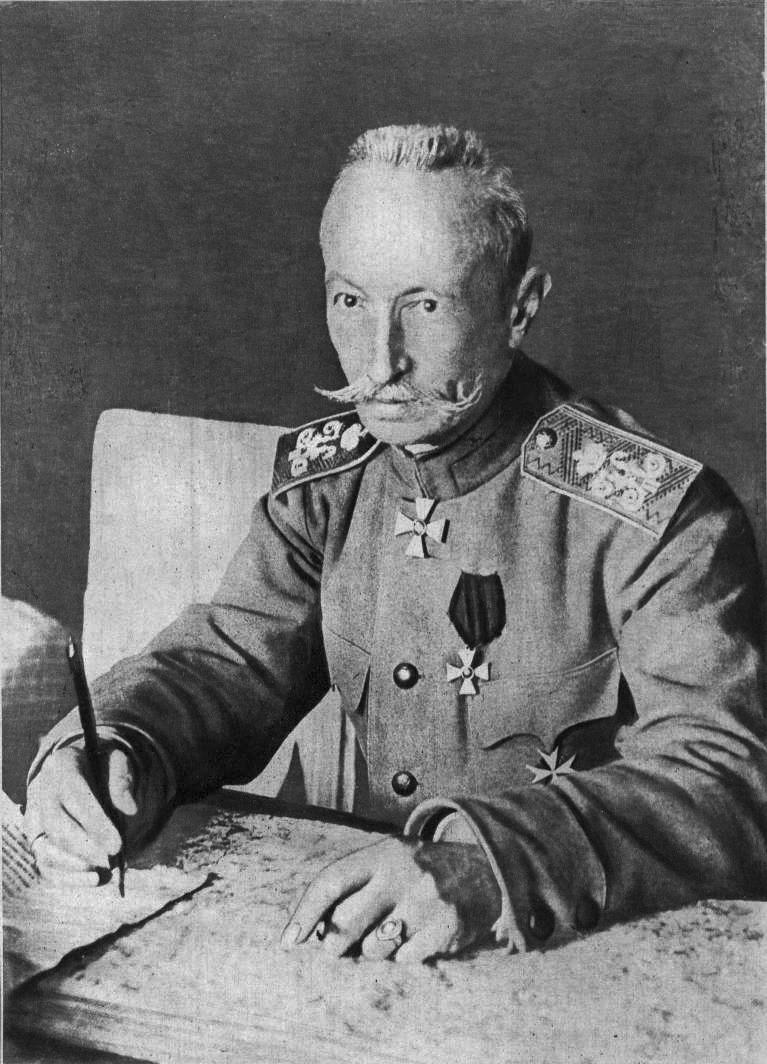
General Aleksei Brusilov

- Brusilov Offensive – Russia launched a massive offense created by General Aleksei Brusilov to break through Austro-Hungarian lines in Galicia (now Ukraine) and relieve pressure for the Allies on the Western Front and the Italian Front in northern Italy.
- Battle of Mont Sorrel – British commander Julian Byng called in a British division to support the Canadian Corps while it recovered from Germans attacks. Canadian casualties were 8,430 after two days of fighting.
- The Austro-Hungarian cargo steamship Albanien, sailing from Trieste to Zelenika and transporting hay, was torpedoed by the Italian submarine Atropo at 05:45 local time west of Jakišnica and sunk; three crew members were killed.
- Born:
  - Robert F. Furchgott, American chemist, recipient of the Nobel Prize in Physiology or Medicine for his discovery that nitric oxide caused cardiovascular activity; in Charleston, South Carolina, United States (d. 2009)
  - Gaylord Nelson, American politician, 35th Governor of Wisconsin, U.S. Senator from Wisconsin from 1963 to 1981, founder of Earth Day; in Clear Lake, Wisconsin, United States (d. 2005)
- Died: Fernand Dubief, 65, French politician, Interior Minister and Minister of Commerce of France from 1905 and 1906 (b. 1850)

== June 5, 1916 (Monday) ==
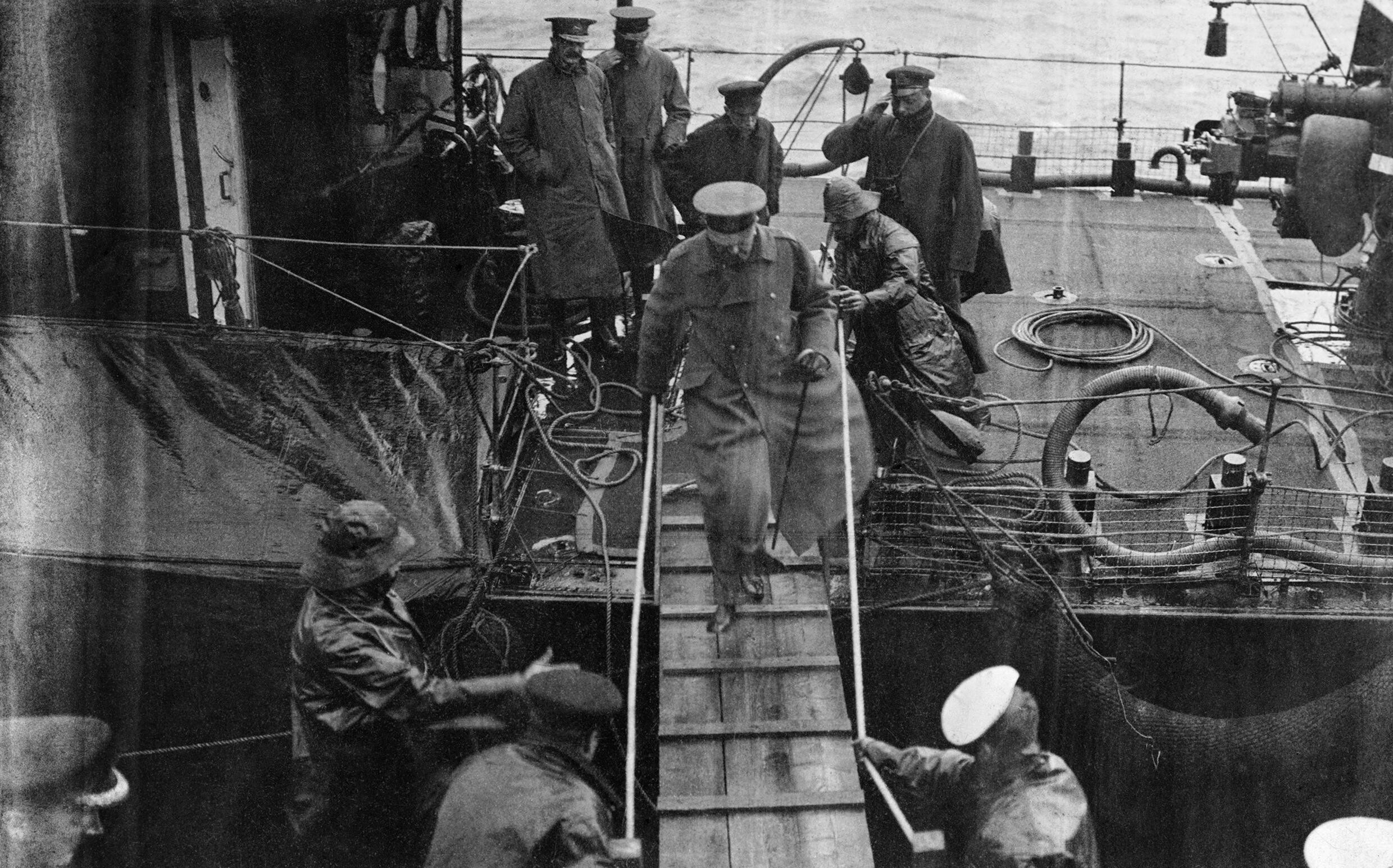
June 5, 1916: One of the last photographs taken of Lord Kitchener.

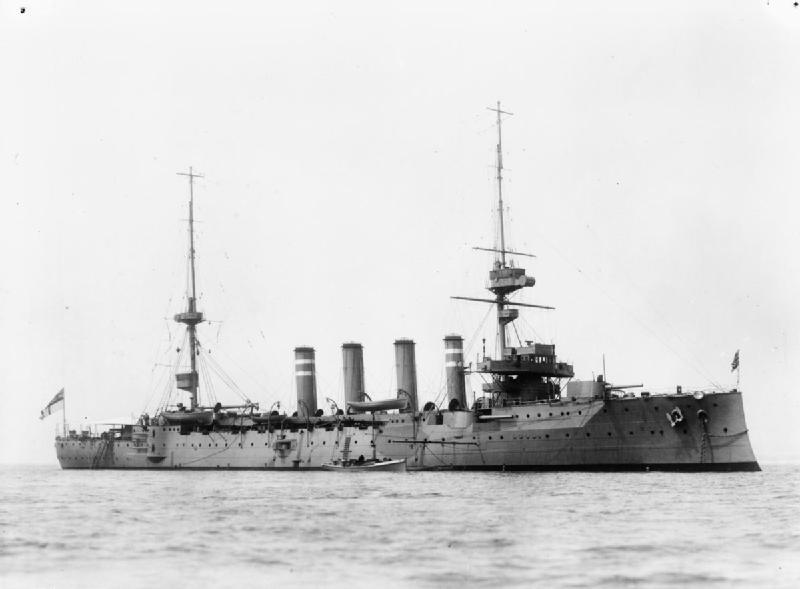
HMS Hampshire

- The Arab Revolt began against the Ottoman Empire when Emirs Ali and Faisal, both sons of Sharif Hussein bin Ali, organized an attack on the Ottoman garrison in Medina.
- Royal Navy cruiser HMS Hampshire struck a mine off Orkney, Scotland and sank, killing 737 crew including Field Marshal Herbert Kitchener, commander of the British Army.
- A series of tornadoes that ravaged the Southern United States over 48 hours started in Arkansas, killing 76 people. The worst incident involved a powerful F4 tornado hitting Heber Springs, Arkansas where 25 people were killed.
- Royal Navy destroyer HMS Patrician was launched by John I. Thornycroft & Company at Southampton, England. It served both the Royal Navy for World War I and the Royal Canadian Navy from 1920 to 1929 when it was scrapped.
- Japanese manufacturer Nippon Kayaku was established to produce explosives before it expanded in chemical manufacturing and pharmaceuticals.
- The School of Oriental Studies of the London Institution received royal charter, eventually becoming The School of Oriental and African Studies, University of London when it included African studies in its curriculum.
- Stein's Dixie Jass Band played its first concert under its new name, the Original Dixieland Jass Band.
- Stone County, Mississippi, named after Mississippi Governor John Marshall Stone, was established with its county seat in Wiggins, Mississippi.
- Born:
  - Sid Barnes, Australian cricketer, played 13 Test matches between 1938 and 1948 for the Australia national cricket team; as Sidney George Barnes, in Annandale, New South Wales, Australia (d. 1973)
  - Paul Bikle, American aeronautical engineer, director of the Dryden Flight Research Center from 1959 to 1971; in Wilkinsburg, Pennsylvania, United States (d. 1991)
  - John Bissell Carroll, American psychologist, developer of the Modern Language Aptitude Test; in Hartford, Connecticut, United States (d. 2003)
  - Eddie Joost, baseball player and manager, played shortstop for Cincinnati Reds, Boston Braves, Philadelphia Athletics and Boston Red Sox from 1936 to 1955, last manager for the Philadelphia Athletics; as Edwin David Joost, in San Francisco, United States (d. 2011)
- Died:
  - Mildred J. Hill, 56, American songwriter, composed the song "Good Morning to All" with a melody later used for "Happy Birthday to You" (b. 1859)
  - James Tyler Kent, 67, American physician, pioneer of homeopathy; died of Bright's disease (b. 1849)

== June 6, 1916 (Tuesday) ==
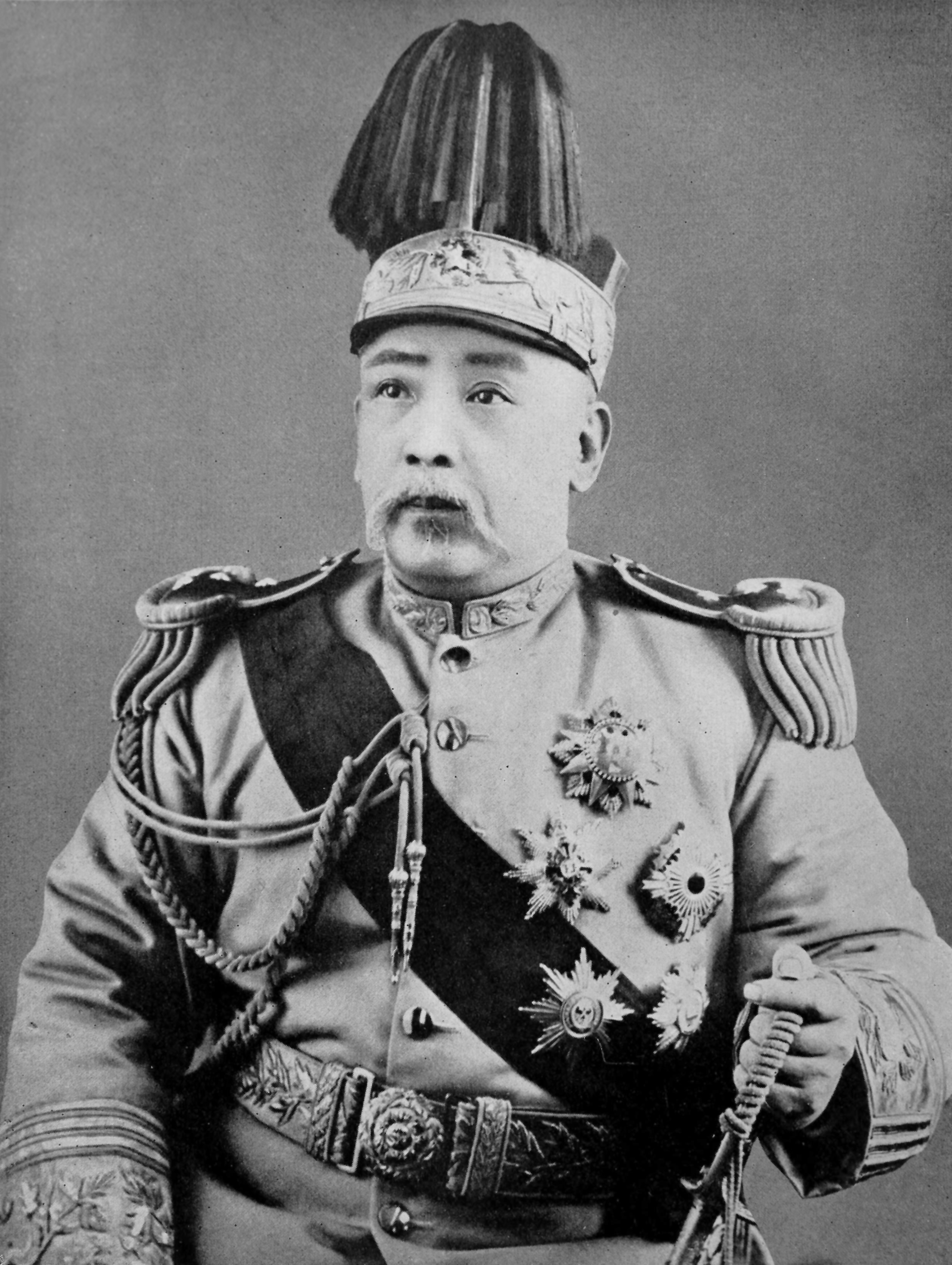
Yuan Shikai, former Emperor of China

- A tornado outbreak spread from Arkansas into the neighboring states of Louisiana, Tennessee, and Mississippi, including an F3 tornado striking the northern suburbs of Jackson, Mississippi and killing 13 people. In total, 112 tornado-related deaths were recorded in the Southern United States.
- The 1st Anzac Entrenching Battalion was established as reinforcing infantry unit for the I ANZAC Corps on the Western Front but later specialized in tunnel warfare.
- The Cleveland Museum of Art opened to the public in Wade Park District, Cleveland. Both the museum and the park are listed in the National Register of Historic Places.
- The Returned Sailors’ and Soldiers’ Imperial League of Australia, the forerunner to the Returned and Services League was founded.
- Born:
  - Hamani Diori, Nigerian state leader, first President of Niger; in Soudouré, French West Africa (present-day Niger) (d. 1989)
  - Adalberto Almeida y Merino, Mexican Roman Catholic clergy, served as Bishop of Tulancingo, Bishop of Zacatecas, and Archbishop of Chihuahua; in Bachíniva, Chihuahua, Mexico (d. 2008)
  - Jack Miller, American politician, U.S. Senator from Iowa from 1961 to 1973, justice for the United States Court of Customs and Patent Appeals and United States Court of Appeals for the Federal Circuit from 1973 to 1991; in Chicago, United States (d. 1994)
  - Tom Bass, Australian sculptor, known for public sculpture works including "The Sisters" and the AMP Sculpture; as Thomas Dwyer Bass, in Lithgow, New South Wales, Australia (d. 2010)
  - Bert Head, English association football player and manager, played defender for Torquay United from 1936 to 1952 and coached several teams including Swindon Town from 1956 to 1965; as Bertram James Head, in Midsomer Norton, England (d. 2002)
- Died: Yuan Shikai, 56, Chinese military official and state leader, President of the Republic of China from 1912 to 1915 then self-proclaimed Emperor of China from 1915 to 1916; died of uremia (b. 1859)

== June 7, 1916 (Wednesday) ==
- Li Yuanhong became President of the Republic of China, the first of three terms he would hold for this position.
- Battle of Verdun – The last of the French defenders at Fort Vaux surrender to the Germans. The Germans lost 2,700 casualties in taking the fort while the French only had 20 casualties.
- Born: George Charles, Caribbean politician, Chief Minister of Saint Lucia from 1960 to 1964 (d. 2004)
- Died: Émile Faguet, 68, French literary critic, noted writings appears in Journal des débats (b. 1847)

== June 8, 1916 (Thursday) ==
- Brusilov Offensive – Russian forces captured Lutsk, Galicia (now Ukraine), capturing 200,000 prisoners and putting the Austro-Hungarian army into full retreat.
- Italian armed merchant cruiser SS Principe Umberto was sunk by Austro-Hungarian U-boat SM U-5 in the Adriatic Sea with 1,926 casualties, the largest number of lives lost in a naval disaster for World War I.
- The Royal Flying Corps established the No. 56, No. 57 and No. 58 Squadrons.
- Born:
  - Francis Crick, English molecular biologist, recipient of the Nobel Prize in Physiology or Medicine for discovering with James Watson the nucleic acid double helix structure in DNA; in Weston Favell, Northampton, England (d. 2004)
  - Richard Pousette-Dart, American artist, founder of the New York School of Art; in Saint Paul, Minnesota, United States (d. 1992)
  - Luigi Comencini, Italian film director, known for comedic films including Everybody Go Home and the television mini-series The Adventures of Pinocchio; in Salò, Kingdom of Italy (present-day Italy) (d. 2007)
  - Hedley Fowler, British air force pilot, famously escaped the German POW camp Oflag IV-C during World War II; in London, England (killed in an air crash, 1944)
  - Rowley Richards, Australian army medical officer, recipient of the Order of the British Empire for saving countless POW lives during the building of the Burma Railway during World War II; as Charles Rowland Bromley Richards, in Summer Hill, New South Wales, Australia (d. 2015)

== June 9, 1916 (Friday) ==
- Battle of Mont Sorrel – Major-General Arthur Currie reorganized the Canadian Corps at Mont Sorrel for a renewed counterattack against the Germans supported by a British division. Artillery began shelling German positions over the 72-hour period to soften enemy defenses.
- Sinai and Palestine campaign — British army engineers drained cisterns and pools totaling five million gallons of water at Wadi Mukhsheib in the Sinai Peninsula and sealed them to prevent refilling during the next rainy season. Without water supplies in the interior, the Ottoman Empire was now only able to travel along the northern coast.
- American naval aviation pioneer Richard C. Saufley was killed on Santa Rosa Island on a flight out of the Naval Aeronautic Station, Pensacola, Florida when his Curtiss hydroplane went down at the 8-hour-51-minute mark of his flight.
- The German association football club Erkenschwick was established in Oer-Erkenschwick, Germany.
- Born:
  - Robert McNamara, American civil servant, 8th United States Secretary of Defense, 5th President of the World Bank Group; in San Francisco, United States (d. 2009)
  - Walter McCrone, American chemist, best known for his analysis of paranormal historical artifacts including the Shroud of Turin and the Vinland map; in Wilmington, Delaware, United States (d. 2002)
  - Jurij Brězan, German Sorbian writer, published noted works in East Germany, recipient of the Order of Karl Marx; in Räckelwitz, German Empire (present-day Germany) (d. 2006)
  - Jean Dallaire, Canadian painter, best known for his mural work at Queen Elizabeth Hotel; as Jean-Philippe Dallaire, in Hull, Quebec, Canada (d. 1965)

== June 10, 1916 (Saturday) ==
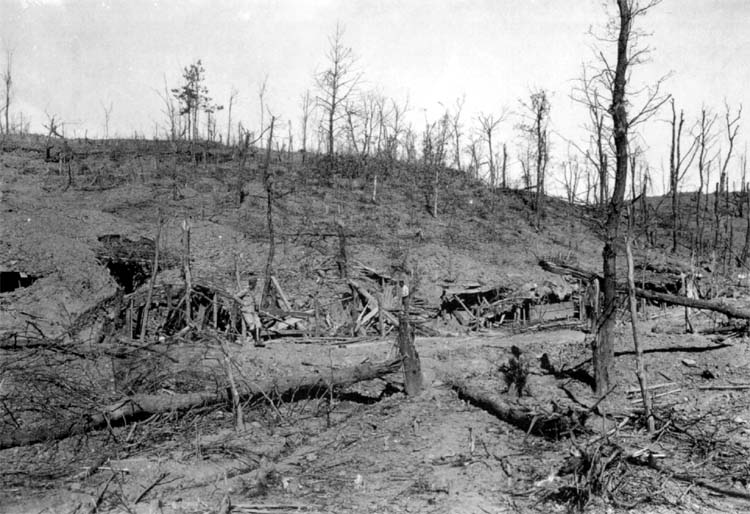
The battlefield after the end of the Battle of Asiago.

- Battle of Asiago – Austria-Hungary failed to capitalize on its breakthrough in the Italian Front as the Russian offence in Galicia forced the empire to redirect military resources to the north. The battle has been catastrophic with heavy casualties on both sides, with Italy enduring 12,000 dead, 80,000 wounded and 50,000 taken prisoner, while Austria-Hungary had 15,000 dead, 75,000 wounded and 15,000 taken prisoner. The political fallout of the battle ended the administration of Antonio Salandra as Prime Minister of Italy, with Paolo Boselli succeeding him.
- Arab Revolt – Hussein bin Ali declared the sovereignty of a new Arab state within the Ottoman Empire spanning from Aleppo to Aden as the Kingdom of Hejaz and ordered his forces to attack the Ottoman garrison in Mecca.
  - Arab forces under command of Emir Abdullah of Transjordan laid siege on the Ottoman-controlled city of Ta'if.
  - Arab Revolt – A force of 3,500 Arabs with support from British and French ships and aircraft, including the British sea carrier HMS Ben-my-Chree, raided the Red Sea port of Jidda.
- Battle for Lake Tanganyika – German steamship Graf von Goetzen, the last of three German ships built to control Lake Tanganyika in Central Africa, was targeted by Belgian aircraft while anchored in the lake port of Kigoma in what is now Tanzania.
- Charles Evans Hughes accepted the nomination as presidential candidate with Charles W. Fairbanks as running mate at the Republican National Convention in Chicago.
- Imperial Trans-Antarctic Expedition – British polar expedition leader Ernest Shackleton chartered a tough trawler vessel from the government of Uruguay in a second attempt to voyage to Elephant Island and rescue the main body of the stranded expedition, but packed ice again prevented the vessel from nearing the island.
- Born:
  - William Rosenberg, American business executive, founder of Dunkin' Donuts; in Boston, United States (d. 2002)
  - Amir Abdullah Khan Rokhri, Pakistani politician, prominent leader in the Pakistan Movement; in Rokhri, British India (present-day Pakistan) (d. 2001)

== June 11, 1916 (Sunday) ==
- The foundation for the Roman Catholic Newman College in Melbourne was laid by Archbishop Thomas Carr.
- Born:
  - Alexander Prokhorov, Australian-Russian physicist, recipient of the Nobel Prize in Physics for research in laser technology; as Alexander Michael Prochoroff, in Atherton, Queensland, Australia (d. 2002)
  - Bob Berry, New Zealand botanist, founded the Hackfalls Arboretum in Tiniroto, New Zealand; as Robert James Berry, in Gisborne, New Zealand (d. 2018)
- Died: Jean Webster, 39, American writer, known for such works as Daddy-Long-Legs and Dear Enemy; died from complications of child birth (b. 1876)

== June 12, 1916 (Monday) ==
- Battle of Mont Sorrel – Canadian shelling of German positions reached its climax with an intense non-stop 10-hour barrage while Canadian and British troops prepared for assault on Mont Sorrel.
- Courts-martial began for 16 British conscientious objectors conscripted to serve in the British Army as non-combatants after disobeying orders from commanding officers.
- The No. 1 Squadron of the Australian Flying Corps began military operations in Heliopolis, Cairo, Egypt, after being established at Point Cook, Victoria, Australia in January.
- The popular Ziegfeld Follies Of 1916 Broadway revue opened at the New Amsterdam Theatre in New York City and ran for 112 performances.
- The Santa Monica Looff Hippodrome opened on the Santa Monica Pier in California as part of a new amusement park attraction. It was designated a National Historic Landmark in 1987.
- Born:
  - Irwin Allen, American director and producer, best known for his disaster films including The Poseidon Adventure and The Towering Inferno; as Irwin O. Cohen, in New York City, United States (d. 1991)
  - Raúl Héctor Castro, Mexican American politician, 14th Governor of Arizona and first Mexican-born American to be governor of the state; in Cananea, Mexico (d. 2015)
- Died: Silvanus P. Thompson, 64, English physicist and mathematician, member of the Royal Society and author of Calculus Made Easy (b. 1851)

== June 13, 1916 (Tuesday) ==
- Battle of Mont Sorrel – Canadian and British troops surprised German defenses following a morning barrage, forcing them to fall back to their original lines within an hour. Around 200 German soldiers were taken prisoner.
- The village of Spirit River, Alberta was established.

== June 14, 1916 (Wednesday) ==
- Battle of Mont Sorrel – Canadian forces repulsed German counterattacks but made no further attempts to capture enemy ground, ending the battle. German casualties from the artillery barrages and assaults numbered 3,436.
- A Paris conference between the Allied Powers led to the signing of the Paris Economy Pact, which included further aims to isolate the Central Powers with economic sanctions.
- Sir Parashurambhau College was established in Pune, India as New Poona College.
- Born:
  - Dorothy McGuire, American actress, nominee for Academy Award for Best Actress for Gentleman's Agreement, recipient of the National Board of Review Award for Best Actress for Friendly Persuasion; in Omaha, Nebraska, United States (d. 2001)
  - Emil Bitsch, German fighter pilot, flew with the Luftwaffe on the Eastern Front, recipient of the Knight's Cross of the Iron Cross; in Baden, German Empire (present-day Germany) (killed in action, 1944)
  - Dewan Prem Chand, Indian peacekeeper, served as United Nations Force Commander in Democratic Republic of the Congo, Cyprus, Namibia and Zimbabwe; in Muzaffargarh, Punjab Province, British India (present-day Pakistan) (d. 2003)
  - Odd Starheim, Norwegian resistance fighter, member of Norwegian Independent Company 1 during World War II, recipient of the War Cross; in Lista Municipality, Norway (killed in action, 1943)
  - James Melvin Rhodes, American academic, known for his leading research into creativity; in Johnstown, Pennsylvania, United States (d. 1976)
  - Izola Curry, American housekeeper, attempted to assassinate Martin Luther King Jr. in 1958; as Izola Ware, in Adrian, Georgia, United States (d. 2015)

== June 15, 1916 (Thursday) ==
- Raid on San Ygnacio – U.S. soldiers with the 14th Cavalry Regiment clashed with Mexican raiders at the border town of San Ygnacio, Texas, resulting in at least a dozen deaths.
- U.S. President Woodrow Wilson signed a bill incorporating the Boy Scouts of America.
- Imperial Trans-Antarctic Expedition – After close to two months on Elephant Island, the main body of the stranded British polar expedition party following the sinking of the polar ship Endurance in November were forced to amputate the toes of one of the expedition members due to gangrene. Stocks of seal and penguin meat were beginning to run low and tensions were high among the party, recalled main body expedition leader Frank Wild.
- The New Zealand Flying School conducted a test flight of the B & W Seaplane — William E. Boeing's first aircraft — setting a New Zealand altitude record of 6,500 feet (1,981 metres).
- Born:
  - Olga Erteszek, Polish-American fashion designer, known for her nightgown and undergarment designs (d. 1989)
  - Herbert A. Simon, American economist, recipient of the Nobel Memorial Prize in Economic Sciences for his theories on bounded rationality and satisficing; in Milwaukee, United States (d. 2001)
  - Tetsuzō Iwamoto, Japanese fighter pilot, considered the top flying ace of the Imperial Japanese Navy during World War II; in Karafuto Prefecture, Empire of Japan (present-day Sakhalin, Russia) (d. 1955)
  - Joe Oros, Romanian-American auto designer, credited for the iconic design of the Ford Mustang; as Joseph E. Oros Jr. (d. 2012)

== June 16, 1916 (Friday) ==
- Arab Revolt – The Ottoman garrison at the Red Sea port of Jidda surrendered to the Arabs.
- The prototype of the Port Victoria aircraft first flew over Isle of Grain, England. Despite being planned as an interceptor fighter plane for German Zeppelins, mass production of the aircraft never happened.
- Born:
  - Francis Cammaerts, British Special Operations Executive agent who organized the rail sabotage team of the French Resistance; in London, England (d. 2006)
  - Ross Erin Butler Sr., American business executive, founding board director of Ore-Ida Foods; in Blaine County, Idaho, United States (d. 2004)
  - Hank Luisetti, American basketball player, played forward for the Stanford Cardinal men's basketball team from 1935 to 1938, credited for developing the running one-handed shot; as Angelo-Giuseppi Luisetti, in San Francisco, United States (d. 2002)
- Died: Henry Sherwin, 73, American business executive, co-founder of Sherwin-Williams (b. 1842)

== June 17, 1916 (Saturday) ==
- Jean Navarre, the first French ace of World War I, was shot down and wounded, ending his combat career with 12 confirmed kills.
- French-American pilot Victor Chapman of the Lafayette Escadrille was attacked and shot down by German fighter pilot Walter Höhndorf during the Battle of Verdun.

== June 18, 1916 (Sunday) ==
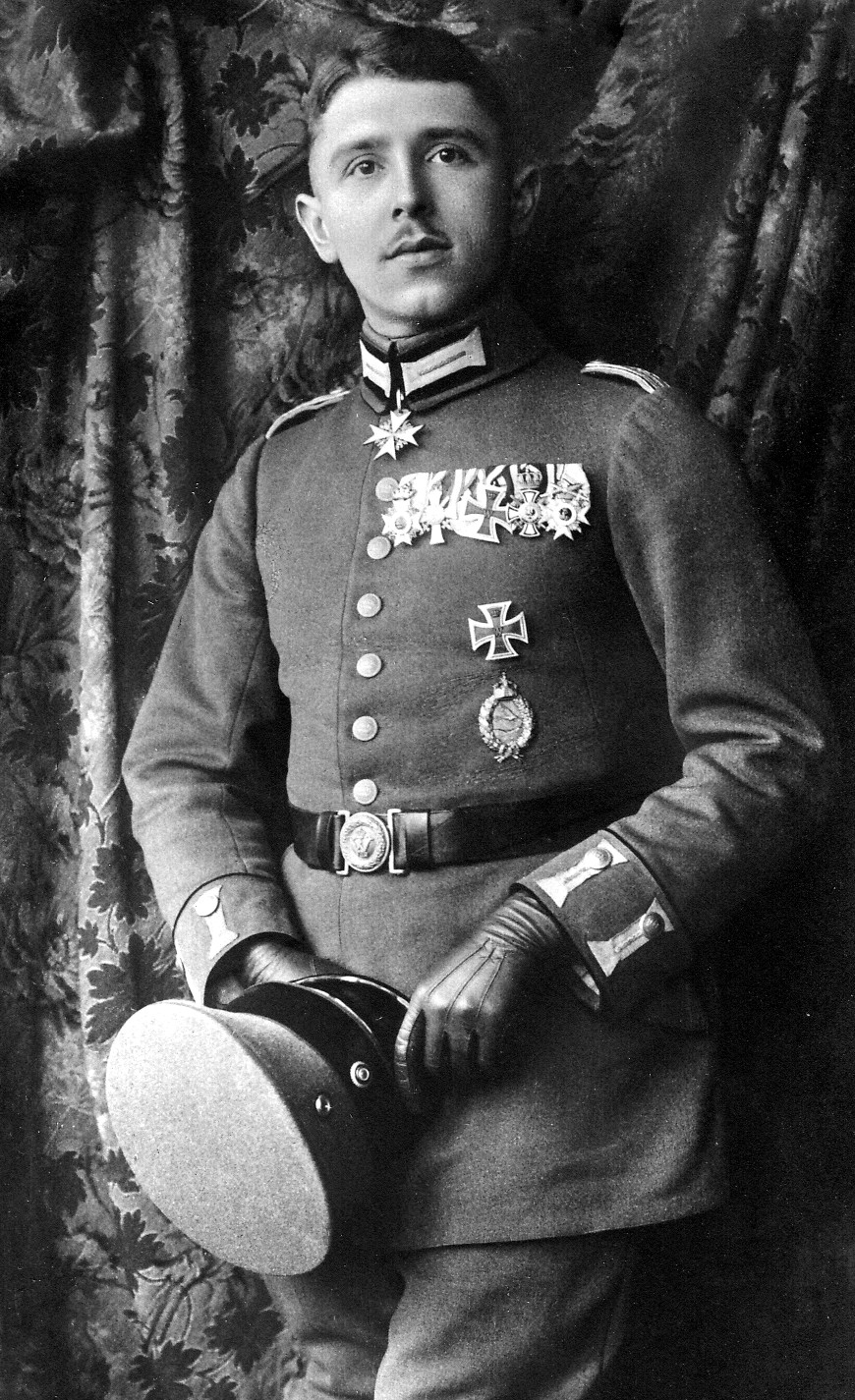
Max Immelmann, German war ace

- Brusilov Offensive – A delayed assault by the Russian Western Army Group under command of General Aleksei Evert, who had opposed the offensive plan made by General Aleksei Brusilov, cost the Russia momentum, as it gave time for the Central Powers to pull soldiers and equipment from the other fronts to counter the offensive. The initial successes of the campaign though caught the world's attention, with Brusilov being credited as the "hero of the hour" by The New York Times.
- Royal Navy destroyer HMS Eden sank after colliding with transport ship SS France in the English Channel with a loss of 43 lives.
- Sinai and Palestine campaign — The Royal Flying Corps bombed the Ottoman airstrip at El Arish on the Sinai Peninsula.
- Max Immelmann, the first German ace of World War I, was shot down and killed by an aircraft with the Royal Flying Corps No. 25 Squadron, a symbolic end to the "Fokker Scourge". He had scored 15 kills.
- The United States Army established the 103rd Infantry Regiment to bolster security along the Mexico–United States border.
- The Timoteo Navarro Museum of Art opened in San Miguel de Tucumán, Argentina.
- Born: Julio César Turbay Ayala, Colombian state leader and diplomat, 25th President of Colombia and 17th Ambassador to the United States; in Bogotá, Colombia (d. 2005)
- Died: Helmuth von Moltke, 68, German military officer, Chief of the German General Staff from 1906 to 1914 (b. 1848)

== June 19, 1916 (Monday) ==
- Born:
  - Mick Anglo, British comic book writer and artist, creator of the superhero Marvelman; as Maurice Anglowitz, in Bow, London, England (d. 2011)
  - William Francis Cody, American architect, major designer of buildings for Palm Springs, California during the Modern architecture movement; in Dayton, Ohio, United States (d. 1978)

== June 20, 1916 (Tuesday) ==
- Born:
  - Jean-Jacques Bertrand, Canadian politician, 21st Premier of Quebec; in Sainte-Agathe-des-Monts, Quebec, Canada (d. 1973)
  - Johnny Morris, Welsh TV personality, best known as the host for children's shows based on zoology including Animal Magic and Tales of the Riverbank; as Ernest John Morris, in Newport, Wales (d. 1999)

== June 21, 1916 (Wednesday) ==
- Battle of Carrizal – Close to 100 United States Cavalry and militia loyal to Venustiano Carranza clashed at the town of Carrizal, Chihuahua, Mexico, resulting in 14 Americans killed, 39 wounded and 24 captured, and 27 Mexicans killed and 11 wounded.
- Born:
  - Joseph Bamford, British business executive, founder of the multinational JCB manufacturing company; in Uttoxeter, Staffordshire, England (d. 2001)
  - Sourendra Nath Kohli, Indian naval officer, 9th Chief of the Naval Staff for India; in Amritsar, British India (present-day India) (d. 1997)
  - William B. Ruger, American inventor, developed the Ruger Standard firearm, co-founder of Sturm, Ruger & Co.; in New York City, United States (d. 2002)

== June 22, 1916 (Thursday) ==
- Battle of Verdun – The Germans gassed French artillery positions around Verdun, France, causing 1,600 casualties.
- The Passing Show of 1916, a musical revue by Sigmund Romberg and Otto Motzan with book and lyrics by Harold R. Atteridge, premiered at the Winter Garden Theatre in New York City and ran for 140 performances. The revue included the hit "Pretty Baby" (with lyrics by Gus Kahn and music by Egbert Van Alstyne) and "The Making of a Girl", the first song by George Gershwin ever performed in public.

== June 23, 1916 (Friday) ==
- Battle of Verdun – A large German assault covering 5 km (3.1 mi) of the Western Front allowed its forces to advance within 5 km (3.1 mi) of the Verdun citadel before they were stopped. The commune of Fleury-devant-Douaumont was overrun but would change hands sixteen times during the course of battle over the next two months.
- Born:
  - Len Hutton, English cricketer, member of the Yorkshire County Cricket Club from 1934 to 1955, and Marylebone Cricket Club from 1938 to 1960; as Leonard Hutton, in Fulneck, Pudsey, Leeds, England (d. 1990)
  - Irene Worth, American actress, best known for her BAFTA-winning role in Orders to Kill, and three-time Tony Award winner for Tiny Alice, Sweet Bird of Youth and Lost in Yonkers; as Harriett Elizabeth Abrams, in Fairbury, Nebraska, United States (d. 2002)
  - Ernst Wilimowski, German-Polish association football player, top all-time scorer for the Poland national football team from 1934 to 1939; as Ernst Otto Prandella, in Kattowitz, German Empire (present-day Katowice, Poland) (d. 1997)

== June 24, 1916 (Saturday) ==
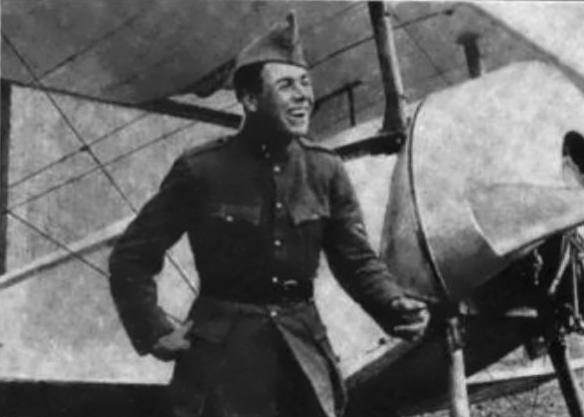
Victor Chapman, American airman

- Battle of Verdun – The joint British-French artillery barrage the German defense positions.
- The British military court found 16 British conscientious objectors guilty for insubordination and sentenced to be shot, but the sentence was immediately commuted to ten years in penal servitude. They were transferred back to England to serve their terms in military prison located at Richmond Castle, where they became known as the Richmond Sixteen. All were eventually released in 1919.
- While flying en route to see a wounded comrade, French-American flight ace Victor Chapman was attacked and shot down over Douaumont by German fighter pilot Kurt Wintgens, becoming the first American airman to die in World War I.
- Australian soldier William Jackson was awarded the Victoria Cross for his actions in a raid near Armentières, France. Jackson had captured one German prisoner and rescued several wounded comrades in no man's land before he was hit by a shell burst that blew his right arm off. Despite the loss of a limb, Jackson refused to return to the rear after receiving a tourniquet and returned repeatedly to no man's land to search for more wounded comrades until all members of his unit were accounted for. Jackson did not learn of his commendation until he returned to Australia on September 8, five days before his 19th birthday.
- A publicity launch for the Wolf Cub section of Scouting was introduced at the Boy Scouts Association's Imperial Headquarters in Buckingham Palace Road, Westminster, England.
- The Ninth Avenue, 50th Street, 55th Street and Fort Hamilton Parkway elevated train stations opened in New York City.
- Born:
  - William B. Saxbe, American politician, 70th United States Attorney General, U.S. Senator from Ohio from 1969 to 1974; in Mechanicsburg, Ohio, United States (d. 2010)
  - John Ciardi, American poet, author of How Does a Poem Mean?; in Boston, United States (d. 1986)
  - Roohangiz Saminejad, Iranian actress, known for her film roles in Lor Girl and Shirin and Farhad; in Bam, Iran (d. 1997)

== June 25, 1916 (Sunday) ==
- Battle of Verdun – The German push towards the Verdun citadel was halted. German casualties were now at c. 200,000 men while French casualties reached c. 185,000.
- The Imperial German Navy captured British ferry SS Brussels while it was bound for England and took Captain Charles Fryatt and his crew prisoner, where they were escorted to Bruges.
- The Bangkok railway station officially opened for service after six years of construction.
- Born: Thomas Baker, American soldier, recipient of the Medal of Honor for action during the Battle of Saipan; in Troy, New York, United States (killed in action, 1944)
- Died: Thomas Eakins, 71, American painter, leader in American realism with noted artworks such as Max Schmitt in a Single Scull and William Rush and His Model (b. 1844)

== June 26, 1916 (Monday) ==
- The royal commission released a report on the Easter Rising in Dublin that was critical of the way the authorities handled the crisis, citing: "Ireland for several years had been administered on the principle that it was safer and more expedient to leave the law in abeyance if collision with any faction of the Irish people could thereby be avoided." That same day, Roger Casement appeared on trial at the Royal Courts of Justice on a charge of treason for his involvement in the Easter Rising and was stripped of his knighthood.
- Born:
  - Giuseppe Taddei, Italian opera singer, best known for his Mozart and Verdi performances in recordings including The Marriage of Figaro and Don Giovanni; in Genoa, Kingdom of Italy (present-day Italy) (d. 2010)
  - Virginia Satir, American social worker and author, known for books on family therapy including Conjoint Family Therapy, Peoplemaking, and The New Peoplemaking; in Neillsville, Wisconsin, United States (d. 1988)
  - Alvin Wistert, American football player, defensive tackle for the Michigan Wolverines; in Chicago, United States (d. 2005)
  - Jiwajirao Scindia, Indian noble, last reigning Maharaja of the Gwalior State before India became independent; as George Jiwajirao Scindia, in Gwalior, British India (present-day India) (d. 1961)
  - Wilhelm Ernst Barkhoff, German banker, founder of GLS Bank and proponent of ethical banking; in Kamp-Lintfort, German Empire (present-day Germany) (d. 1994)
- Died:
  - Addison Hutton, 81, American architect, designer of major college campus and public buildings in Philadelphia including the Historical Society of Pennsylvania (b. 1834)
  - Josiah Strong, 69, American religious leader, leader of the Social Gospel movement (b. 1847)

== June 27, 1916 (Tuesday) ==
- Russian military manufacturer Ya. M. Sverdlova State Owned Enterprise was established in Dzerzhinsk, Russia.
- Died:
  - Daniel Webster Marsh, 77, Canadian politician, 4th Mayor of Calgary (b. 1838)
  - Dirk de Graeff van Polsbroek, 82, Dutch diplomat, ambassador to Japan from 1863 to 1870, one of the key diplomatic advisers to Emperor Meiji (b. 1833)
  - James Stirling, 80, British judge, member of the High Court of Justice from 1886 to 1900, and Lord Justice of Appeal from 1900 to 1906 (b. 1836)

== June 28, 1916 (Wednesday) ==
- Ross Sea party – British polar exploration ship Aurora was repaired and refitted to return to the Antarctic and pick up the 10 marooned expedition members after the ship lost anchor and drifted in the ice over a year ago.
- British banker Leopold de Rothschild opened Richmond Synagogue in Richmond, London for the area's Jewish community.
- Born:
  - Olle Björklund, Swedish newscaster, host of the Swedish nightly news program Aktuellt; as Sven Olof Björklund, in Botkyrka Municipality, Sweden (d. 1981)
  - Stewart Farrar, English writer and advocate of Wiccanism, author of What Witches Do and The Witches' Way; as Frank Stewart Farrar, in Essex, England (d. 1999)
  - Harvey Jackins, American therapist, founder of Re-evaluation Counseling; as Carl Harvey Jackins, in Idaho, United States (d. 1999)
- Died: Benjamin Piatt Runkle, 79, American army officer, commander of the 13th and 45th Ohio Infantry Regiment during the American Civil War, one of the founders of the Sigma Chi fraternity (b. 1836)

== June 29, 1916 (Thursday) ==
- The Italian air squadron 78a Squadriglia was established as the fourth of Italy's original fighter squadrons.
- Born:
  - Ruth Warrick, American actress, best known for the role of Phoebe Tyler Wallingford (deceased) on All My Children from 1970 to 2005, and her film debut in Citizen Kane; in St. Joseph, Missouri, United States (d. 2005)
  - Paul Thomson, American botanist, pioneer in exotic fruit agriculture and co-founder of the California Rare Fruit Growers Association; in British India (present-day India) (d. 2008)

== June 30, 1916 (Friday) ==
- Battle of the Boar's Head – The British launched a diversionary against the Germans at the French village Richebourg-l'Avoué prior to the Somme offensive.
- German submarine SM U-10 struck a mine and sank in the Gulf of Finland with all 29 crew lost.
- The Royal Flying Corps established the No. 66 Squadron.
- The first flight of an aircraft with all-metal stressed skin construction, the Zeppelin-Lindau Rs.II, took place.
- Since the start of 1916, 46 German airship sorties crossed the coast of England, and German airships have attacked London twice. British antiaircraft guns only shot down one German airship.
- Amateur golfer Chick Evans won his first and only title at the U.S. Open in Minneapolis, two strokes ahead of runner-up Jock Hutchison.
- The city of Adelaide, Australia received 217.9 millimetres (8.58 in) of rain, its highest monthly rainfall since records began in 1839.
- Born: Al Hake, Australian air force officer, member of the "Great Escape" from German POW camp Stalag Luft III and executed by the Gestapo, in Sydney (d. 1944)
- Died:
  - John Daly, 70, Irish revolutionary leader, leading member of the Irish Republican Brotherhood and uncle to Kathleen Clarke, wife of Tom Clarke; executed for taking part in the Easter Rising (b. 1845)
  - Gaston Maspero, 70, French archaeologist, developed the Sea Peoples theory for the invasions of ancient Egypt experienced prior to the Late Bronze Age collapse (b. 1846)
