= Russian hospital ship Vpered =

First world war Russian hospital ship

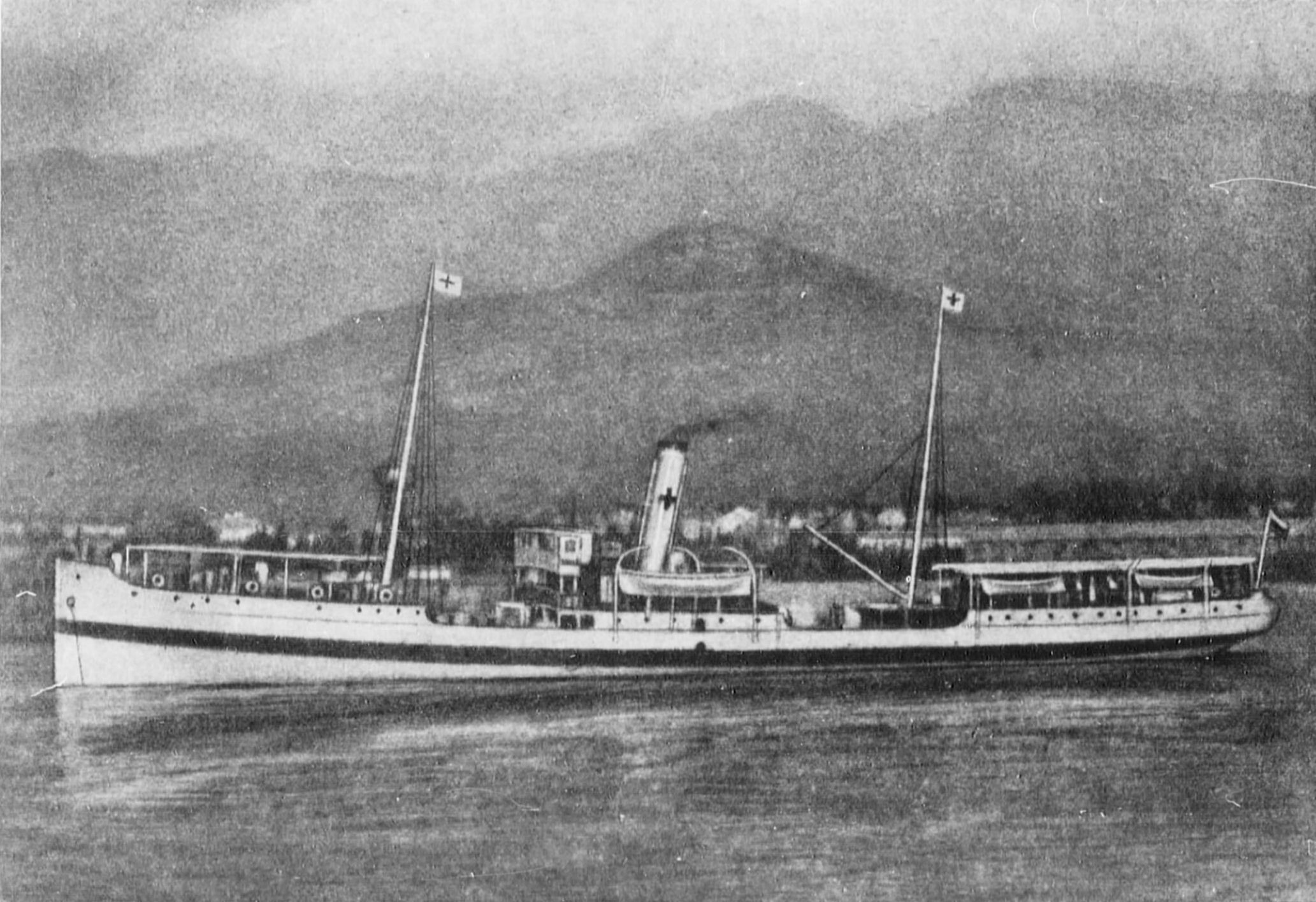
- Vpered during her service as a hospital ship in World War I.

History

Imperial Russia
- Name: SS Vpered (1898-1914); (Red Cross) HS Vpered (1914-1916)
- Owner: Azov Black Sea Steamship Co.
- Port of registry: Imperial Russia, Rostov
- Ordered: 1898
- Builder: Stabilimento Tecnico
- Laid down: 1898
- Launched: 1898
- Completed: 1898
- Maiden voyage: 1898
- In service: 1898
- Fate: Torpedoed and sunk 8 July 1916

General characteristics
- Type: Passenger ship/Hospital ship
- Tonnage: 859 GRT

HS Vpered (Russian: госпитальное судно "Вперёд") was a Russian hospital ship that was torpedoed by the Imperial German Navy submarine SM U-38 on 8 July 1916.

== Construction ==
SS Vpered was built at the Stabilimento Tecnico shipyard in Trieste, Italy, in 1898 for Azov Black Sea Steamship Company. She was launched and completed in the same year. The ship was assessed at 859 GRT.

== World War I and sinking ==
Vpered was converted into a hospital ship when World War I broke out and operated in the Black Sea to evacuate wounded Russian soldiers from the Eastern Front.

On 8 July 1916, Vpered was torpedoed by the Imperial German Navy submarine SM U-38 in the Black Sea between Rize and Batum. She sank shortly after. She was not carrying any wounded soldiers at the time, but seven people died in her sinking. Her survivors were saved a short time later.

The Russian Empire claimed that Ottoman forces sank Vpered rather than the Germans. The Ottoman Empire replied that both the Vpered and the Russian Hospital Ship SS Portugal ( which was torpedoed and sunk on March 17, 1916 ) were sunk by mines.

== See also ==
- List of Russian Fleet hospital ships
