= Walter Potter Ritchie =

Recipient of the Victoria Cross

- Walter Potter Ritchie (depicted on a cigarette card)
- Born: 27 March 1892; Glasgow, Lanarkshire, Scotland
- Died: 17 March 1965 (aged 72); Edinburgh, Midlothian, Scotland
- Military career
- Allegiance: United Kingdom
- Branch: British Army
- Rank: Sergeant
- Units: The Seaforth Highlanders
- Conflicts: First World War
- Awards: Victoria Cross; Croix de Guerre

Walter Potter Ritchie VC (27 March 1892 – 17 March 1965) was a Scottish recipient of the Victoria Cross, the highest and most prestigious award for gallantry in the face of the enemy that can be awarded to British and Commonwealth forces. The award was made for his actions during the Battle of the Somme in the First World War.

== Early life ==
Walter Potter Ritchie was born in Glasgow on 27 March 1892, one of six children of Walter Ritchie, an ironworker, and his wife Helen née Murphy. He was educated at a school in the Cowcaddens area of Glasgow. After completing his schooling he became a blacksmith's apprentice but soon enlisted in the British Army, joining the 8th Cameronians despite being underage. He was later transferred to the 2nd Battalion of The Seaforth Highlanders as a drummer.

== First World War ==
On the outbreak of the First World War, Ritchie was sent with his unit to France, as part of the 4th Division, British Expeditionary Force. He fought in the Battle of Mons in August 1914 and then in the First Battle of the Aisne the following month. He was wounded in October 1914 near Armentières. The Seaforth Highlanders later moved to the Somme sector, stationed near Mailly-Maillet.

On 1 July 1916, the opening day of the Battle of the Somme, the 4th Division was tasked with capturing the ground to the north of Beaumont Hamel. Its advance was preceded by an artillery barrage and once it ceased, the troops of the division moved forward in a series of waves. Ritchie's battalion was part of the second wave. The advance faltered due to heavy machine gun fire and due to the extent of casualties among the officers, some of the British soldiers began falling back. Ritchie, seeing this, climbed to the parapet of a trench and sounded his bugle, which he carried with him, contrary to orders. The bugle call rallied the British soldiers and helped restore order and reverse the withdrawal. After the battle, there were only around 80 survivors from his battalion.

For his actions on 1 July, Ritchie was recommended for the Victoria Cross (VC). The VC, instituted in 1856, was the highest award for valour that could be bestowed on a soldier of the British Empire. The citation, published in the London Gazette read:

No. 68 Dmr. Walter Ritchie, Sea Highrs. For most conspicuous bravery and resource, when on his own initiative, he stood on the parapet of an enemy trench, and, under heavy machine-gun fire and bomb attacks, repeatedly sounded the "Charge" thereby rallying many men of various units who, having lost their leaders were wavering and beginning to retire. This action showed the highest type of courage and personal initiative. Throughout the day Drummer Ritchie carried messages over fire-swept ground, showing the greatest devotion to duty.

— London Gazette, 8 September 1916

Ritchie was presented with his VC by King George V on 25 November 1916 in a ceremony at Buckingham Palace. After the VC investiture, he went to Glasgow for a period of leave but declined to talk to friends about his experiences during the VC action. He later received the French Croix de Guerre, which was presented to him by Lieutenant General Sir Aylmer Hunter-Weston in December 1916.

Returning to active duty with the Seaforth Highlanders on the Western Front, his battalion would go on to be involved in several engagements for the remainder of the war, including actions around Arras and the Battle of Passchendaele in 1917 and the Battle of the Lys and the fighting along the Hindenburg Line the following year. By the end of the war, he had been wounded a total of five times, as well as being gassed twice.

== Later life ==
Remaining in the British Army after the war, Ritchie was transferred to the 1st Battalion of the Seaforth Highlanders. By this time he was married to Mary née McLagan and the couple went on to have two children. He was soon promoted to sergeant and served as the battalion's drum-major. During the Armistice Day commemorations of 1921, he was part of the VC honour guard for The Unknown Warrior at Westminster Abbey. He retired from the British Army in 1929 but then remained involved with the military life by working as a recruitment officer in Glasgow. He later worked in the education system.

During the Second World War, Ritchie rejoined the British Army and served with the Royal Army Ordnance Corps on the Home Front until his discharge in 1941, on account of his health. Ritchie died on 17 March 1965 in Edinburgh and his remains were cremated.

== Medals and legacy ==
As well as the VC and Croix de Guerre, Ritchie was entitled to the 1914 Star with Mons Clasp, British War Medal and Victory Medal for his First World War service. He also held the 1939-45 Star and War Medal 1939-45 for his service during the Second World War, and was a recipient of coronation medals for two sovereigns, George VI and Elizabeth II, and the George V Silver Jubilee Medal. The medals are no longer in the possession of the family, having been first sold in 1970 and presently owned by an Australian collector. On 1 July 2022, 106 years to the day after Ritchie's heroism earned him the Victoria Cross, it was announced that his medals were to be offered at auction by Spink in London.

The bugle on which he rallied his comrades during the Battle of the Somme is held at the Queen's Own Highlanders Museum at Inverness. On 1 July 2016, a hundred years to the day of Ritchie's VC action, a centenary paving stone outside the People's Palace in Glasgow was unveiled in his memory. Fifty members of his family were present at the ceremony.
