= SS Portugal =

Coordinates: 42°00′36″N 41°11′24″E

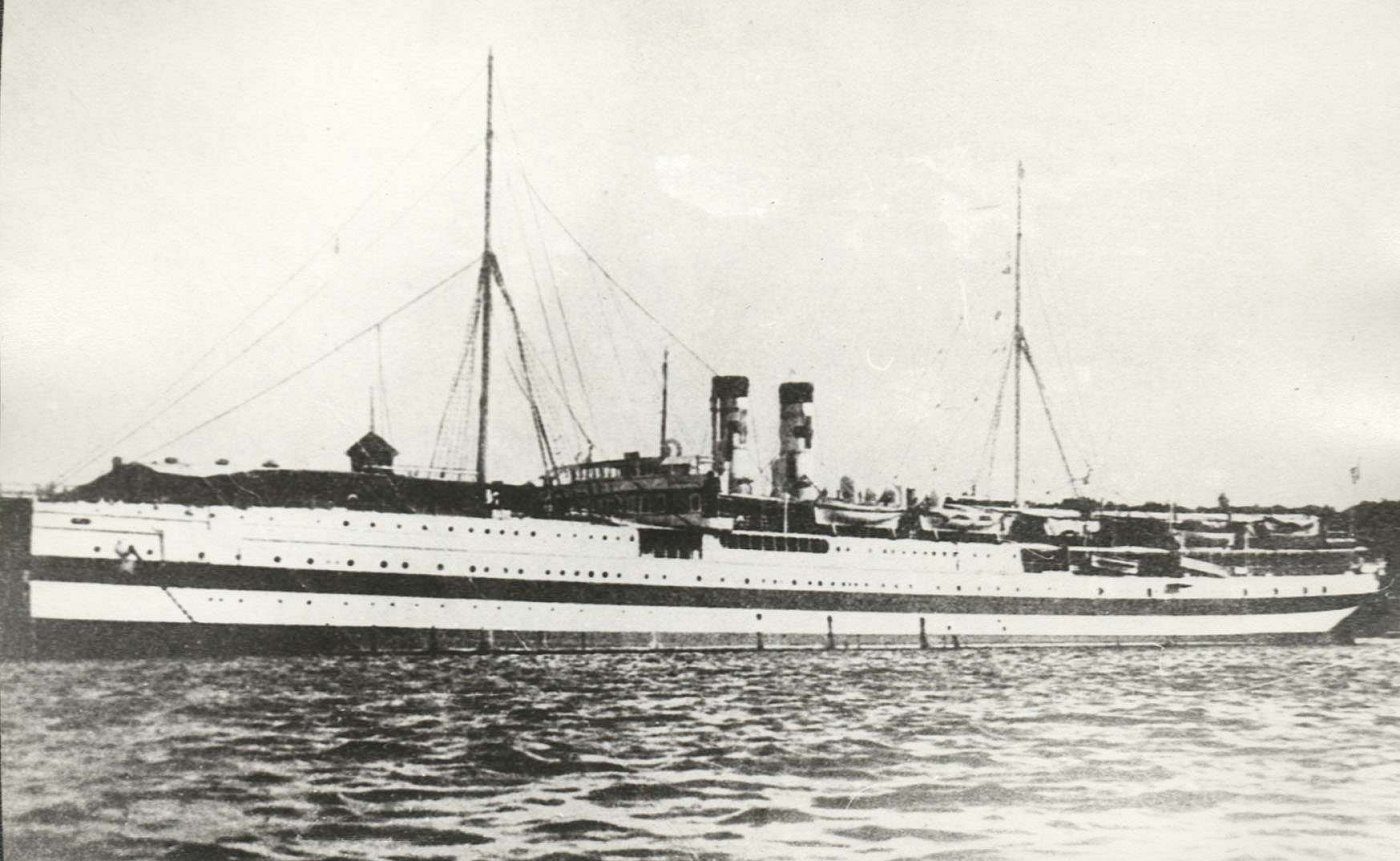
- Russian hospital ship Portugal

History

Russia
- Name: Portugal
- Owner: Brazil and River Plate Line
- Operator: Imperial Russian Navy
- Builder: Messageries Maritimes Company, La Ciotat
- Yard number: 63
- Launched: July 1886
- Fate: Sunk by a torpedo on March 30 [O.S. March 17] 1916.

General characteristics
- Type: Cruise liner
- Tonnage: 5,357 tons
- Displacement: 7,720 tons
- Length: 460 ft (140 m)
- Beam: 46 ft (14 m)
- Installed power: 4,800 hp (3,600 kW)
- Propulsion: Triple expansion engine
- Speed: 16.5 knots (30.6 km/h; 19.0 mph)
- Capacity: 125 first class; 90 second class; 700 third class

SS Portugal (Russian: госпитальное судно "Португаль") was a steamship originally built by a French shipping company, but requisitioned for use as a Russian hospital ship during the First World War. On March 30 [O.S. March 17] 1916 she was sunk by a torpedo from the German U-boat U-33.

== History ==
She was originally built in 1886 for the Brazil and River Plate Line of the Messageries Maritimes Company. She was chartered or purchased by the Russians for use as a hospital ship in the Black Sea. The ship, serviced to take up wounded soldiers along the sea shore Ardeshen, Rize Port, Fakhtia, Tiribon and Of, the ship could have the chance to make only five voyages, beginning on 27 February 1916.

== Sinking ==
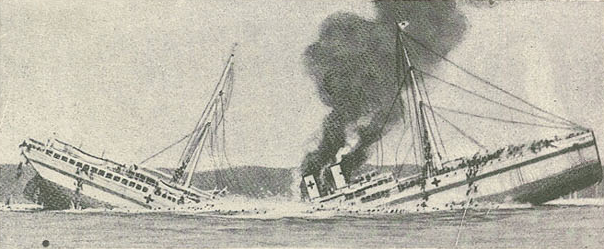
The sinking of Portugal

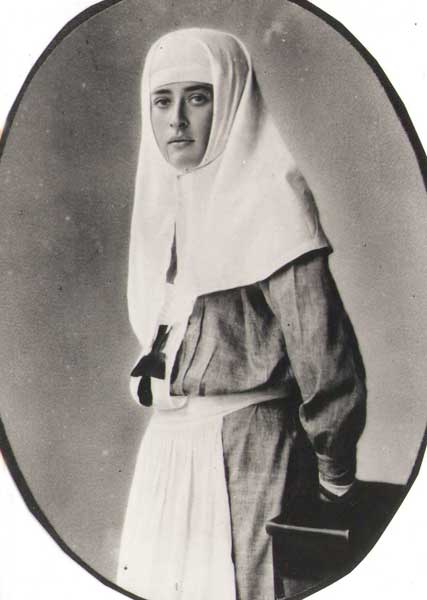
Georgian princess Aneta Andronnikova, one of the Red Cross nurses who died in the Portugal incident.

On March 30 [O.S. March 17] 1916, 1916, Portugal was towing a string of small flat-bottomed boats to ferry wounded from the shore to the ship. Off Rizeh, on the Turkish coast of the Black Sea, she had stopped as one of the small boats was sinking and repairs were being made. The ship was not carrying wounded at the time, but had a staff of Red Cross physicians and nurses on board, as well as her usual crew.

The ship's crew saw a periscope approaching the vessel but as the ship was a hospital ship and protected by the Hague conventions no evasive actions were taken. Without warning the submarine fired a torpedo which missed. The U-boat, U-33, came around again fired a torpedo from a distance of 30 feet (9.1 m), which hit near the engine room, breaking the ship into two pieces.

== Vperiod ==
On July 8 [O.S. June 25] 1916, another Russian hospital ship, named Vperiod (Вперёд; also transcribed, French-style, as Vperiode) was sunk between Rizeh and Batum, allegedly by the German U-boat U-38. The boat was not carrying wounded, as she was on her trip to the frontline. Seven people died, the rest were saved.

The Russian government claimed that Turkish forces sank Portugal, and Vperiod. The Turkish government replied that both ships were sunk by mines.

== See also ==
- List of hospital ships sunk in World War I
- List of Russian Fleet hospital ships
