= Claud =

Claud is a given name. Notable people with the name include:

- Claud Allister (1888–1970), English actor
- Claud Beelman (1883–1963), American architect
- Claud Irvine Boswell (1742–1824), Scottish judge
- Claud Thomas Bourchier (1831–1877), English recipient of the Victoria Cross
- Claud E. Cleeton (1907–1997), physicist notable for his work on the microwave spectroscopy of ammonia
- Claud Cockburn (1904–1981), radical English journalist controversial for communist sympathies
- Claud Derrick, former Major League Baseball shortstop
- Claud Lovat Fraser (1890–1921), English Artist, designer and author
- Claud Hamilton, 1st Lord Paisley (1543–1621), Scottish politician
- Claud Hamilton, 2nd Baron Hamilton of Strabane (1606–1638), the third son of James Hamilton
- Claud Hamilton, 4th Earl of Abercorn, PC (1659–1691), Scottish and Irish peer and Jacobite
- Claud Heathcote-Drummond-Willoughby (1872–1950), British Conservative Party politician
- Alfred Claud Hollis (1874–1961), British Resident to the Sultan of Zanzibar (1923–1929); Governor of Trinidad and Tobago (1930–1936)
- Claud Jacob GCB GCSI KCMG (1863–1948), British Army officer who served in the First World War
- Claud Ashton Jones (1885–1948), Rear Admiral in the United States Navy and a Medal of Honor recipient
- Claud Mintz, American pop musician
- Claud Morris (1920–2000), British newspaper owner who sought to make peace between Arabs and Israelis
- Claud O'Donnell (1886–1953), Australian rugby union and rugby league player and represented his country at both sports
- Claud Phillimore, 4th Baron Phillimore (1911–1994), English architect, 4th Baron Phillimore
- Claud Raymond VC (1923–1945), British recipient of the Victoria Cross
- Claud Schuster, 1st Baron Schuster (1869–1956), British barrister, Permanent Secretary to the Lord Chancellor's Office
- Claud Andrew Montagu Douglas Scott, DSO (1906–1971), Colonel in the Irish Guards
- Claud Severn (Chinese Translated Name: 施勳), British colonial administrator
- Claud Eustace Teal, fictional character in a series of stories by Leslie Charteris entitled The Saint, starting in 1929
- Claud Buchanan Ticehurst (1881–1941), British ornithologist
- Claud Thomas Thellusson Wood, Bishop in the mid part of the Twentieth century
- Claud Woolley (1886–1962), English cricketer who played for Gloucestershire and Northamptonshire
- Lord Claud Hamilton (1787–1808) (1787–1808), British nobleman and politician
- Lord Claud Hamilton (1813–1884) PC (1813–1884), British Conservative politician
- Lord Claud Hamilton (1843–1925) (1843–1925), British Member of Parliament (MP)
- Lord Claud Hamilton (1889–1975), GCVO, CMG, DSO (1889–1975), British soldier and courtier

== See also ==
- Claud, Alabama, an unincorporated community in Elmore County, Alabama
- Claud Butler, brand of cycle currently produced by Falcon Cycles
- Claud Elliott Lake Provincial Park, provincial park in British Columbia, Canada, on northern Vancouver Island
  - Claud Elliott Creek Ecological Reserve, British Columbia
- Claud Jones-class destroyer escort, a class of destroyer escorts built for the US Navy in the late 1950s
- GER 'Claud Hamilton' (LNER Class D14/D15/D16), class of 4-4-0 steam locomotive designed by James Holden
- Saint-Claud, commune in the Charente department in southwestern France
- USS Claud Jones (DE-1033), lead ship of the Claud Jones-class destroyer escorts, launched 27 May 1958
- Claude (disambiguation)
