= Harold G. Bowen Sr. =

United States Navy admiral (1883–1965)

Harold Gardiner Bowen Sr.
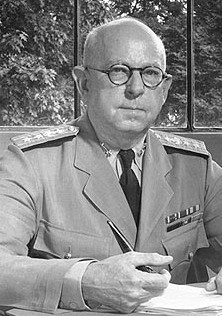
- Rear Admiral Harold Gardiner Bowen, during World War II
- Born: 6 November 1883; Providence, Rhode Island, U.S.
- Died: 1 August 1965 (aged 81); Providence, Rhode Island, U.S.
- Burial place: Arlington National Cemetery, Arlington, Virginia
- Spouse: Edith Brownlie Bowen (1890–1968)
- Relatives: VADM Harold G. Bowen Jr. (1912–2000)
- Military career
- Allegiance: United States of America
- Branch: United States Navy
- Service years: 1905–1947
- Rank: Vice admiral
- Commands: USS Hopkins; Office of Naval Research
- Conflicts: World War I World War II
- Awards: Distinguished Service Medal

Harold Gardiner Bowen Sr. (6 November 1883 – 1 August 1965) was a United States Navy Vice admiral, former head of the Office of Naval Research and a mechanical engineer. He was the recipient of the Distinguished Service Medal and he was the namesake of USS Bowen. His son Harold G. Bowen Jr. also became a Vice Admiral, known for his involvement in the inquiry into the Pueblo incident.

== Early life and education ==
Harold Gardiner Bowen was born 6 November 1883 in Providence, Rhode Island, to Amos Miller Bowen and Eliza Rhodes Henry. His father had been a Union officer during the Civil War and served in the Rhode Island House of Representatives for six years. Bowen graduated from the United States Naval Academy, Annapolis, Maryland in January 1905.

Bowen married Edith Brownlie of Vallejo, California, 27 September 1911 at the First Presbyterian Church in Vallejo. He earned a Master's degree in mechanical engineering from Columbia University in 1914.

== Naval career ==
=== Commission and early career ===
Upon graduation in 1905, Bowen was assigned to Maryland and then to Dixie in 1906. He received his commission as ensign upon passing his final examinations as a midshipman in the spring of 1907, after which he was assigned to Kansas during the first leg of the Great White Fleet. He transferred to Pennsylvania in the spring of 1908 and eventually became the Chief Engineer's first assistant.

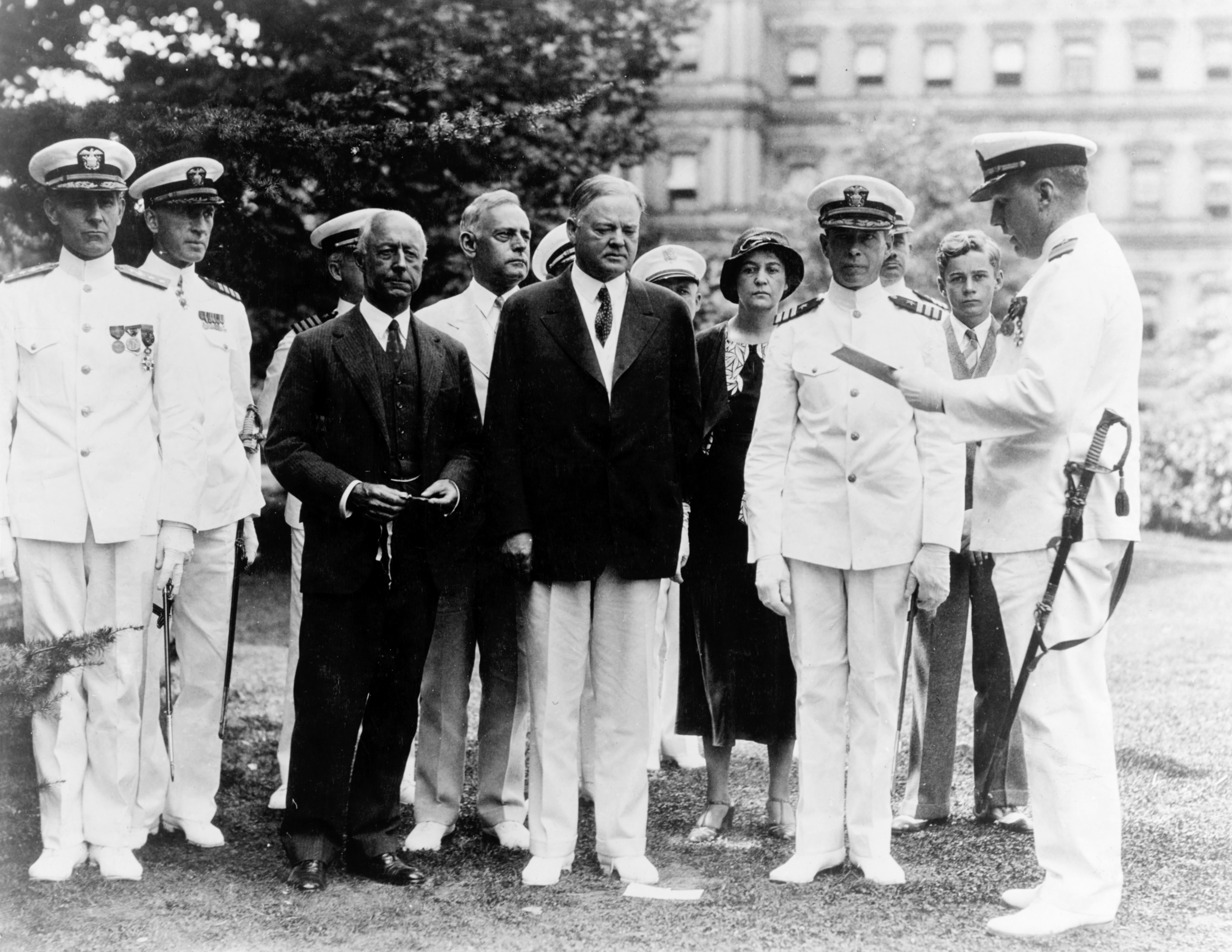
Commander Claud A. Jones, receiving the Medal of honor for actions aboard USS Memphis, (ex -Tennessee). Captain Bowen is pictured, second from left as Assistant Chief of the Bureau of Engineering, and former Chief Engineer of Tennessee.

In 1910, Bowen's request for a transfer to Hopkins as the executive officer was granted. Aboard Hopkins he learned a great deal about engineering due to the poor condition of the ship and eventually became the engineering officer as well as the executive officer, with only two officers aboard. Hopkins suffered a boiler accident and two sailors were killed, but Bowen was away from the ship that day taking a promotions exam. After the commanding officer departed, Bowen was the only officer left on Hopkins and became commanding officer as a lieutenant.

Bowen went on to serve as Chief Engineer on several ships and was attached to Tennessee in 1914, followed by Pittsburgh (ex-Pennsylvania) in late 1915 and Arizona in late 1918.

Bowen spent three years ashore ending July 1922, part of it as a shop superintendent and later as Engineer officer of the Mare Island Navy Yard. He became Assistant Fleet Engineer under Admiral Edward Walter Eberle, Commander of the Battle Fleet, embarked on California. He was later the Fleet Materiel Officer for the Battle Fleet under Admiral Samuel Robison, aboard Seattle. Bowen returned to shore as Production Manager of Puget Sound Navy Yard, prior to 1930.

=== Bureau of Engineering ===
Bowen was the Assistant Chief of the Bureau of Engineering from 1931 to 1935 and then the Chief of the Bureau of engineering from 1935 to 1939. While there Bowen was a champion for research and development (R&D) of high pressure, high temperature steam propulsion, which employed pressures at 650 PSI and temperatures of 800 F. This technology was said radically to have changed maritime steam turbine operation, increasing the speed and range of Navy ships in World War II. Later research suggested that assessments of high-steam technology as transformationally successful and a unique advantage to America’s war efforts in the Pacific rested too heavily on Bowen’s own accounts and that the results of high-steam technology were mixed.

RADM Bowen, standing on the right, with other members of the National Defense Research Committee, July 2, 1940.

=== Naval Research Laboratory ===
Bowen was Director of the Naval Research Laboratory (NRL) from 1939 to 1941. According to Amato, in "Pushing the Horizon", a history of the Naval Research Laboratory, Bowen's leadership of NRL was mixed. He championed vital research, such as Radar, yet his personality conflicts with key figures like Vannevar Bush and Secretary of the Navy Frank Knox ultimately excluded the Navy and NRL from the Manhattan Project. Similar conflicts with William Sterling Parsons, Rickover and others also prevented Bowen from being involved post war nuclear development handing development of the Nuclear navy to Admiral Hyman G. Rickover at the Bureau of Ships instead. Although Bowen and NRL were excluded from the Manhattan project, NRL's work starting in 1939 on thermal separation of uranium isotopes at the Philadelphia Navy Yard steam plant did become a part of the project to build the atomic bomb. The S-50 facility at Oak Ridge National Laboratory was based on that concept as well.

=== Strike breaking ===
One of Bowen's duties during the war was to seize and operate corporations for federal government under Presidential executive orders. His and the Navy's first corporate seizure of World War II was Federal Shipbuilding and Drydock Company in Kearny, New Jersey. The large shipyard near New York City had shut down due to a strike for the better part of August 1941 with no work being done on $493 million ($10.8 billion today) in defense contracts. As the Navy's Officer-in-charge, Bowen operated the yard for 134 days meeting many of the originally scheduled deadlines returning operation back to the company in early January 1942. He was also the officer in charge during the seizure of Los Angeles Shipbuilding and Dry Dock Company. He would seize and operate a half dozen other major industrial plants, among others, for the Navy during the war.

=== Later career ===
In 1942, Bowen was made Special Assistant to the Under Secretary of the Navy, James V. Forrestal (1942–1944) and after Secretary Knox's death, Bowen became Special Assistant to the Secretary of the Navy, Forrestal (1944–1947). In 1946, Forrestal made Bowen the first leader of the Office of Research and Invention (ORI) which would eventually become the Office of Naval Research. In January 1947, Bowen made a six-point policy proposal to Navy leadership pushing for comprehensive R&D into nuclear propulsion, munitions, nuclear medicine and nuclear science, but he failed and those activities went to the Bureau of Ships under Admiral Rickover instead of Bowen's ORI. Bowen retired on 1 June 1947, a week short of 46 years of service.

== Death ==
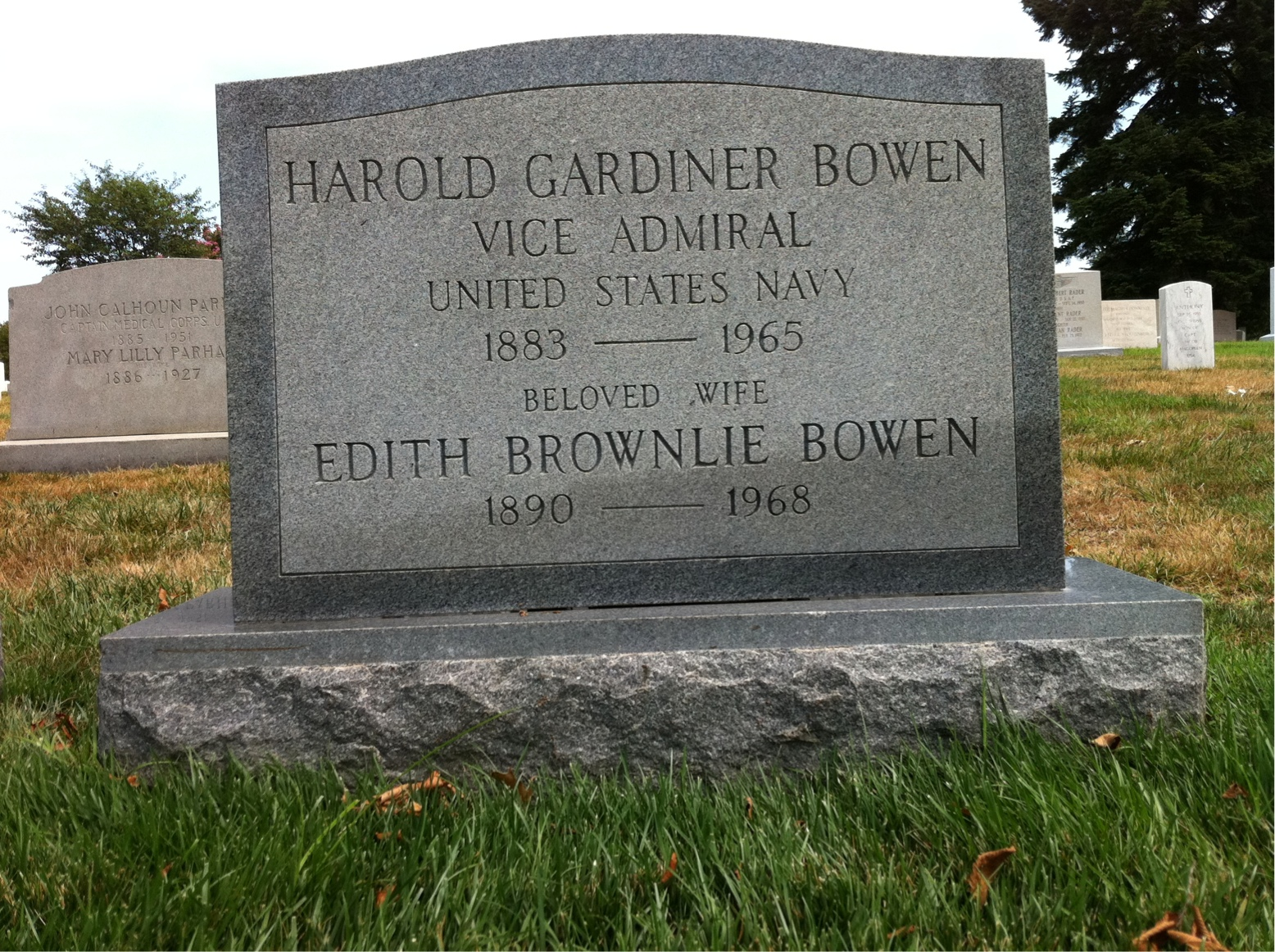
Grave at Arlington National Cemetery

Bowen died 1 August 1965, at Our Lady of Fatima Hospital, Providence, Rhode Island. His residence was in Cranston, Rhode Island at the time of his death. He was interred 4 August 1965 at Arlington National Cemetery, section 4, grave 3188-B. He was survived by his wife Edith Brownlie-Bowen and his son Harold G. Bowen Jr.

== Awards and honors ==
- He was the namesake of USS Bowen (FF-1079)
- Rhode Island Heritage Hall of Fame inductee, 1992
- The Vice Admiral Harold G. Bowen Award is used by the Navy to recognize important inventions made by military or civilian employees of the Navy.
- Letter of Commendation from the Secretary of the Navy Frank Knox for Bowen's services in the development and perfection of Radar.
- Several commendatory letters from Secretary Knox regarding Bowen's handling of Federal Shipbuilding and Drydock Company.
- Distinguished Service Medal (US Navy), from Secretary of the Navy Forrestal for his career of service to the Navy. Specifically citing his work relating to radar and steam propulsion research and his wartime duties in taking over industrial plants ensuring vital war material production.

== Bibliography ==
- Bowen, Harold G. (1951). The Edison Effect. West Orange, NJ: Thomas Alva Edison Foundation. OCLC 261128207.
- Bowen, Harold G. (1954). Ships, Machinery and Mossbacks: The Autobiography of a Naval Engineer. Princeton, N.J.: Princeton Univ. Press. OCLC 602168949.
- Bowen, Harold G.; Kettering, Charles F. (1954). A short history of technology. West Orange, NJ: Thomas Alva Edison Foundation. OCLC 3044534.
