= Clod =

A clod is a lump of dirt.

Clod may also refer to:

== People ==
- Bente Clod (born 1946), Danish poet and writer
- Frederick Clod (1625–after 1661), English alchemist and physician

== Acronyms ==
- National Legion of Decency, also known as the Catholic Legion of Decency
- Continuous level of detail, a computer graphics technique to adapt the detail of the displayed 3D object to the user needs

== Other uses ==
- Beef clod or Chuck clod, two cuts of beef
- Antonov An-14, NATO reporting name "Clod", a Soviet transport aircraft
- Clods, literal name of the Regavim kibbutz in Israel
- The Clod, a 1913 Western film
- Clod, a character in Nella the Princess Knight, an animated children's television series
- Clod, a character in Elemental, a 2023 animated Pixar film
- Clod, a character in Dumb Ways to Die
- Soil clod, an aggregate

== See also ==
- Clod Ensemble, UK company
- "The Clod and the Pebble", a poem by William Blake
- Claude (disambiguation)
- Cloud (disambiguation)
