= Charles H. Willey =

US Navy Machinist and Medal of Honor recipient

Charles Henry Willey
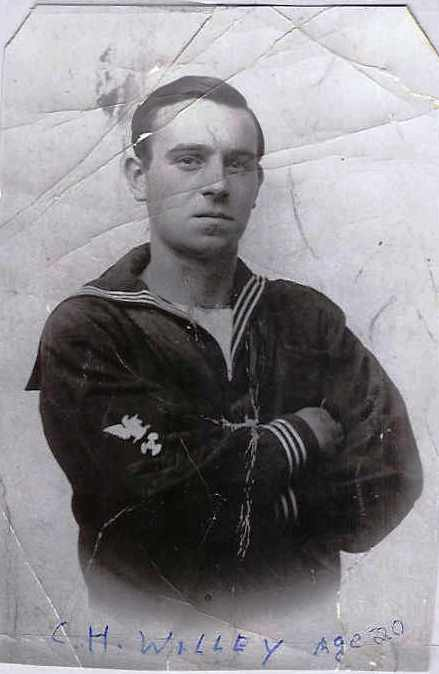
- Born: March 31, 1889; East Boston, Massachusetts, US
- Died: September 11, 1977 (aged 88); Concord, New Hampshire, US
- Military career
- Allegiance: United States
- Branch: United States Navy
- Service years: 1908 - 1917
- Rank: Machinist
- Unit: USS Memphis
- Conflicts: World War I
- Awards: Medal of Honor (peacetime award)

Charles Henry Willey (March 31, 1889 – September 11, 1977) was a United States Navy Machinist who was awarded the Medal of Honor for actions during the tsunami that wrecked USS Memphis. Machinist Willey was awarded the medal for this action along with Lieutenant Claud Ashton Jones and Chief Machinist's Mate George William Rud.

Willey enlisted in the Navy in August 1908 and was appointed to the warrant officer rank of machinist on December 28, 1914. He was medically retired from the Navy on July 30, 1917, and resided in East Concord, New Hampshire.

On August 1, 1932, he received the Medal of Honor for heroism on board the cruiser USS Memphis when she was struck by a tsunami on August 29, 1916.

He died in 1977 at the age of 88 and is buried in Maple Grove Cemetery in Concord, New Hampshire.

== Medal of Honor citation ==
Rank and organization: Machinist, U.S. Navy. Place and date: Off Santo Domingo City, Santo Domingo, August 29, 1916. Entered service at: Massachusetts. Born: March 31, 1889, East Boston, Massachusetts G.O. No.: --August 1, 1932.

Citation:

For extraordinary heroism in the line of his profession while serving on board the U.S.S. Memphis, at a time when that vessel was suffering total destruction from a tsunami while anchored off Santo Domingo City, 29 August 1916. Machinist Willey took his station in the engineer's department and remained at his post of duty amidst scalding steam and the rush of thousands of tons of water into his department as long as the engines would turn, leaving only when ordered to leave. When the boilers exploded, he assisted in getting the men out of the fire room and carrying them into the engine room, where there was air instead of steam to breathe. It was approximated that he carried up 106 men on his shoulders, saving countless lives. He received serious 3rd degree burns from the steam himself. Machinist Willey's conduct on this occasion was above and beyond the call of duty.

== See also ==
- List of Medal of Honor recipients in non-combat incidents
