= Claud A. Jones Award =

American Society of Naval Engineers award

The Claud A. Jones Award is an award presented annually to the "Fleet Engineer of the Year" by the American Society of Naval Engineers (ASNE) since 1987. The award recognizes the efforts of United States fleet or field engineers who have made significant contributions to improving operational engineering or material readiness of the United States maritime forces during the past three years prior to nomination.

The award is named in memory of Medal of Honor recipient Admiral Claud Ashton Jones for "extraordinary heroism in the line of his profession" as a result of his courageous actions in 1916 while serving as engineer on USS Memphis (CA-10) when she was wrecked in the harbor of Santo Domingo by an unexpected storm surge that originated from Hurricane Eight of the 1916 Atlantic hurricane season. Jones' career spanned over 40 years including his midshipman days with the first 24 years of his service spent largely on ships and with the fleet while serving with distinction in engineering assignments.

== Criterion ==
The ASNE criterion for nomination states: "The nominee must have made sustained significant contributions to improving operational engineering or material readiness of maritime defense forces culminating in the three-year period ending in the current year. Evidence of the personal involvement and an assessment of the significance of the nominee's contribution should be submitted. If, for security reasons, the details of the actions cannot be publicly disclosed, the statement should be sufficiently specific for recognition of the accomplishment by those qualified to assess it and should be endorsed by a select number of experienced senior executives with authorized access to the information."

== Past Recipients of the Claud A. Jones Award ==
Source: American Society of Naval Engineers

- 1987 - Commander Carl N. Strawbridge, USN - Repair of USS Stark (FFG-31)
- 1988 - Captain Richard T. Holmes, USN - Engineer Officer, USS Constellation (CV-64)
- 1989 - Commander Reginald J. Erman, USN - Repair Officer, USS Emory S. Land (AS-39)
- 1990 - Commander Ray S. McCord, USN - Repair Officer, USS Samuel Gompers (AD-37)
- 1991 - Commander James M. Hunn, USN - Battle Damage Repair
- 1992 - Mr. Thomas G. Connors - Military Sealift Command Fleet
- 1993 - Captain Richard H. Funke, USN - Director, Engineering Training Group - Atlantic
- 1994 - Commander David C. Neily, USN - CO, Shore Intermediate Maintenance Activity, Guantanamo Bay
- 1995 - Commander Kurt J. Harris, USN - OIC of the SIXTH Fleet Ship Repair Unit Detachment, Bahrain
- 1996 - Commander Kevin M. McCoy, USN - While serving as Repair Officer on board USS L.Y. Spear (AS-36)
- 1997 - Mr. Jon C. Leverette (Tie) - Development of T-45 Integrated Maintenance Program (IMP)
- 1997 - Commander Kenneth P. Roey, USN (Tie) - While serving as Repair Officer at SIMA, San Diego
- 1998 - Commander David W. Bella, USN - OIC USN Ship Repair Facility, Detachment Sasebo
- 1999 - Commander Robert G. Butler, Jr., USN - Commanding Officer, SIMA Norfolk
- 2000 - Commander Patrick J. Keenan, USN - Officer in Charge, Ship Repair Unit, Bahrain
- 2001 - Commander Kevin M. O'Day, USCG - Cutter Support Branch Chief, Maintenance and Logistics Command, Pacific
- 2002 - Captain (Sel.) James G. Green, USN - Engineer Officer, USS Constellation (CV 64) and Repair Officer, SUPSHIP San Diego
- 2003 - Lieutenant James A. Novotny, USCG - While serving in the Naval Engineering Division at Coast Guard Headquarters, and as Assistant Section Chief for Patrol and Standard Boats at Maintenance and Logistics Command, Atlantic
- 2004 - Lieutenant Robert B. Bailey, USN - As Engineering Assessor and Diesel Team Leader at Afloat Training Group (ATG) Pacific, as MPA in USS Tarawa (LHA-1), and as chief engineer in USS Germantown (LSD-42)
- 2005 - Lieutenant Commander William A. Hale, USN - Ship's Maintenance Manager in USS Carl Vinson (CVN-70) and Battle Force Intermediate Maintenance Activity Manager
- 2006 - Lieutenant Commander Michael J. Paradise, USCG - Project Officer for the Coast Guard's 210-foot and 270-foot Medium Endurance Cutter (WMEC) Mission Effectiveness Project (MEP)
- 2007 - Lieutenant Commander Roberto M. Abubo, USN - Chief Engineer, USS Bonhomme Richard (LHD-6)
- 2008 - Master Chief Machinery Technician Bradley G. McMinn, USCG - Outstanding achievements and contributions to improving the operational readiness of the Coast Guard Cutter Fleet while assigned to Maintenance and Logistics Commands Atlantic and Pacific, Advanced Ship System Instruction and Support Teams
- 2009 - CDR Bradford Paul Bittle, USN
- 2010 - LCDR Gregory Rothrock, USCG
- 2011 - Mr. Larry A. Wilkerson
- 2012 - Mr. Scott C. Ramalho
- 2013 - CW04 Gregory Collins, USN
- 2014 - LT Caitlin R. Clemons, USCG
- 2015 - LCDR Jeffrey Payne, USCG
- 2016 - LCDR Dennis L. Richardson, USN
- 2017 - Mr. Joseph D. Peterson
- 2018 - Mr. Daniel Norton
- 2019 - Mr. Duane Roof

== See also ==
- List of engineering awards
