= George William Rud =

- CMM George W. Rud
- Born: October 7, 1883; Minneapolis, Minnesota
- Died: August 29, 1916 (aged 32) off Santo Domingo, Dominican Republic
- Burial place: Minneapolis, Minnesota
- Military career
- Allegiance: United States
- Branch: United States Navy
- Service years: 1900–1916
- Rank: Chief Machinist's Mate
- Unit: USS Memphis (CA-10) formerly USS Tennessee (ACR-10)
- Conflicts: non-combat award
- Awards: Medal of Honor

George William Rud (October 7, 1883 – August 29, 1916) was a United States Navy Chief Machinist's Mate received the Medal of Honor during the destruction of the USS Memphis (CA-10) formerly USS Tennessee (ACR-10) during a tsunami. Lieutenant Claud Ashton Jones and Machinist Charles H. Willey were also awarded the Medal of Honor for their actions on August 29, 1916.

== Medal of Honor citation ==
Rank and organization: Chief Machinist's Mate, U.S. Navy. Born: October 7, 1883, Minneapolis, Minn. Accredited to: Minnesota. (August 1, 1932.)

Citation:

For extraordinary heroism in the line of his profession while attached to the U.S.S. Memphis, at a time when that vessel was suffered total destruction from a hurricane while anchored off Santo Domingo City, 29 August 1916. C.M.M. Rud took his station in the engine room and remained at his post amidst scalding steam and the rushing of thousands of tons of water into his department, receiving serious burns from which he immediately died.

== Update to Medal of Honor citation ==
While making steam to get underway from harbor in the Dominican Republic, the Memphis was struck broadside by numerous storm waves from an off shore hurricane. It is speculated that a submarine earthquake contributed to the size creating a tsunami, as the ship bounced off the bottom of the harbor several times. Finally, an enormous wave drove the ship into the rocks on the shore. The damage to its hull and engines was irreparable.

CMM Rud helped secure the boilers as the keel of the ship was bent by the force of the waves, resulting in the propeller shaft seizing. Without the action by CMM Rud and Lt Claud Ashton Jones, the boilers may have exploded causing the total loss of the ship. Machinist Charles H. Willey who was in the engine room manning his station until ordered to leave, helped remove Rud and Ashton from the steam saturated atmosphere.

MMC Rud was mortally injured by the steam, but did not die immediately; he survived for several days after the incident.

== See also ==
- List of Medal of Honor recipients
- List of Medal of Honor recipients in non-combat incidents
