= Qannir =

Qannir قنْير Kannir
- Village
- Etymology: from personal name
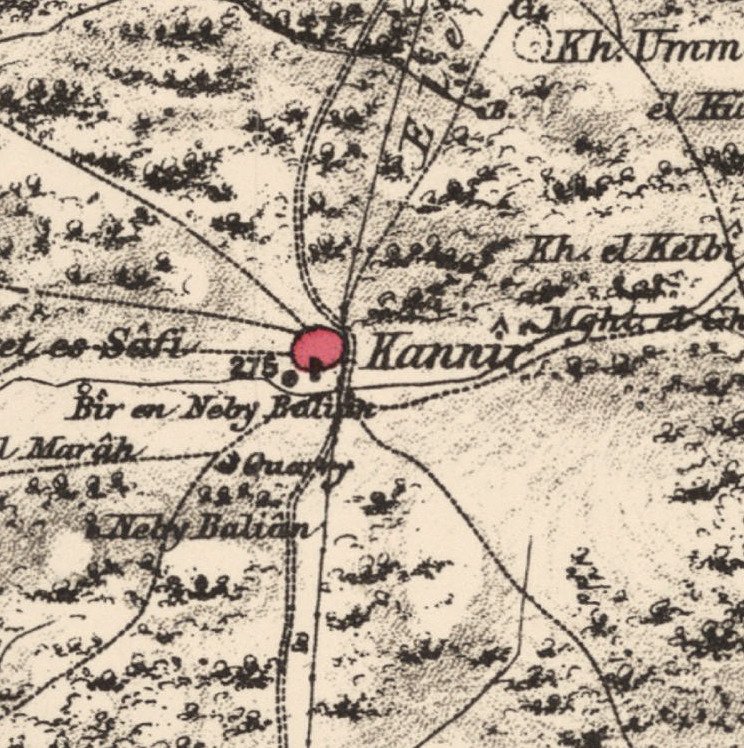
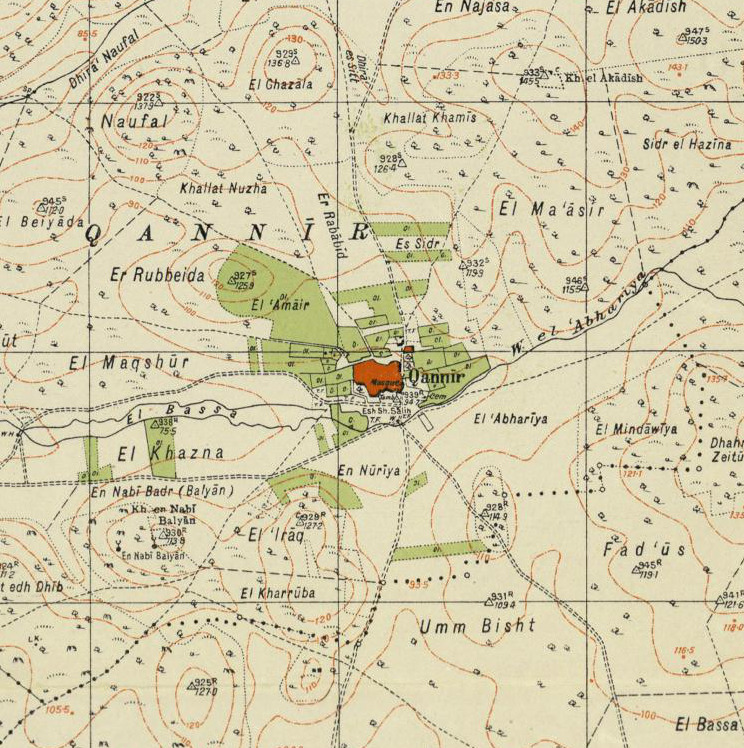
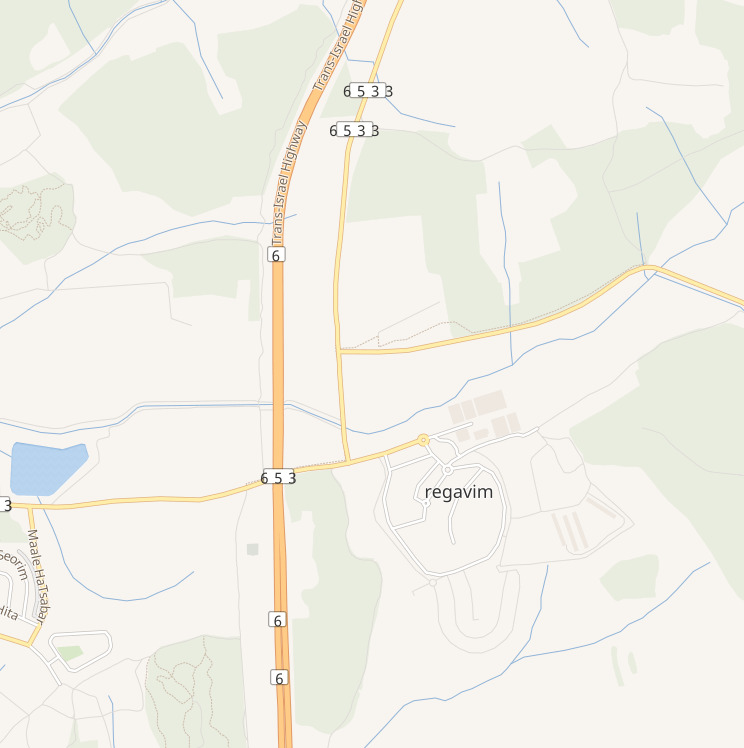
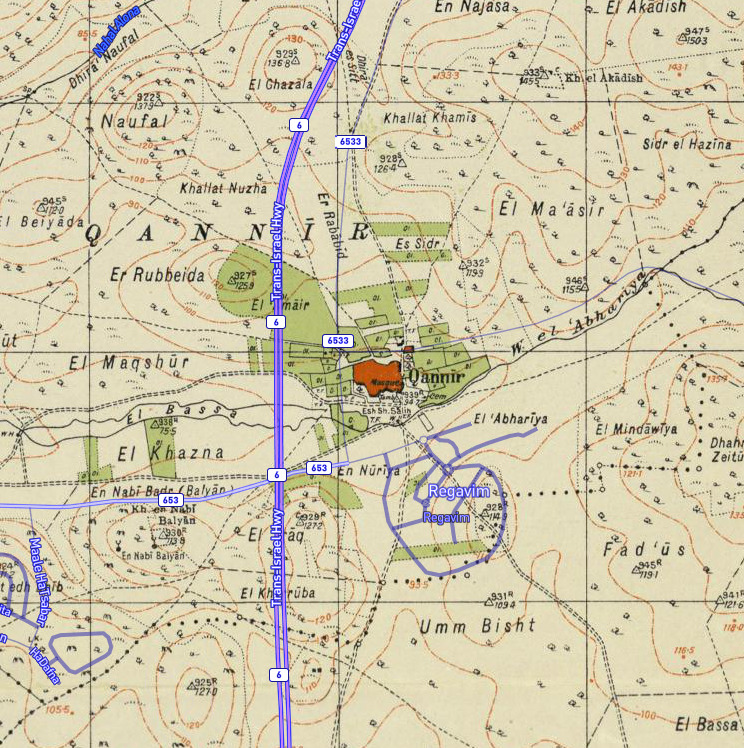
- 1870s map 1940s map modern map 1940s with modern overlay map A series of historical maps of the area around Qannir (click the buttons)

- Location within Mandatory Palestine
- Coordinates: 32°31′42″N 35°01′51″E
- Palestine grid: 153/214
- Geopolitical entity: Mandatory Palestine
- Subdistrict: Haifa
- Date of depopulation: 25 April 1948

Area
  - Total: 10,826 dunams (10.826 km^{2}; 4.180 sq mi)

Population (1945)
  - Total: 750
- Cause(s) of depopulation: Influence of nearby town's fall
- Secondary cause: Fear of being caught up in the fighting
- Current Localities: Regavim

Qannir (Arabic: قنْير) was a Palestinian village, located 35 kilometers south of Haifa. With 750 inhabitants in 1945, it was depopulated in the lead up to the 1948 Arab-Israeli war.

== History ==
In the late Ottoman era, Qannir appears on sheet 45 of Jacotin's map drawn-up during Napoleon's invasion in 1799.

In 1859, the English consul Rogers estimated the population to be 250, who cultivated 24 feddans of land. By 1882, PEF's Survey of Western Palestine described the place as a village of adobe of moderate size, with one well to the south, and another to the west. By a later account, the village consisted of stone houses built side by side.

A population list from about 1887 showed that el Kannir had about 665 inhabitants, all Muslim.

=== British Mandate era ===
In the 1922 census of Palestine, conducted by the British Mandate authorities, Qannir had a population of 400; all Muslims, increasing slightly in the 1931 census to 483, still all Muslims, in a total of 92 houses.

In the 1945 statistics the population was 750 Muslims with 10,826 dunums of land. Of this, a total of 5,760 dunums were used for cereals; while 460 dunums were irrigated or used for orchards, while 22 dunams were built-up (urban) land.

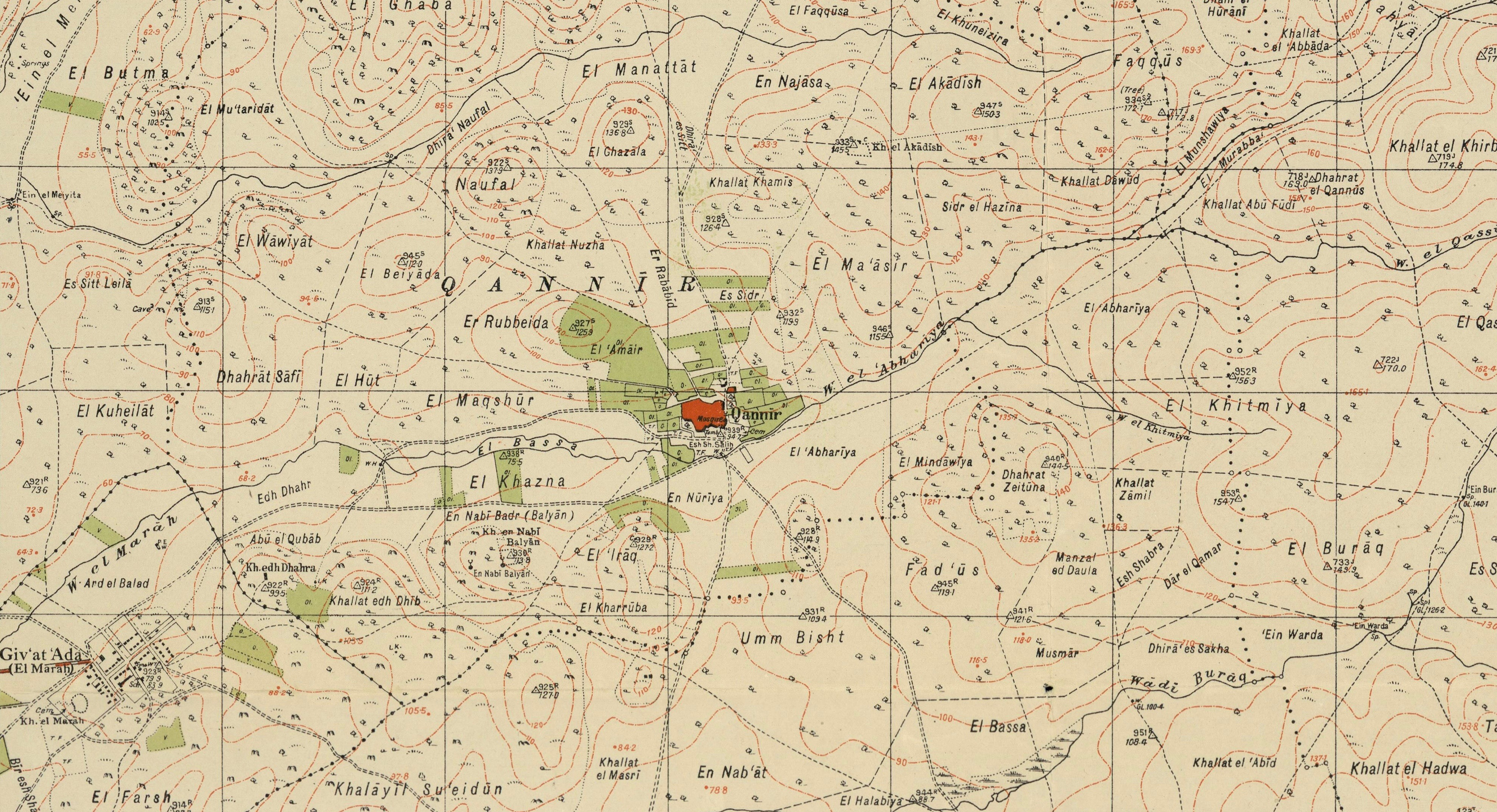
Qannir 1942 1:20,000

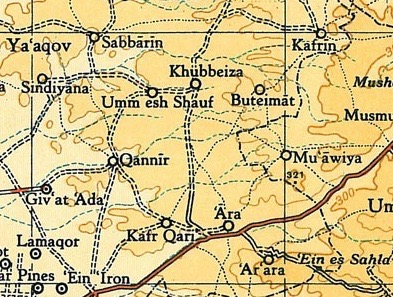
Qannir 1945 1:250,000

=== 1948, and after ===
Between 22 and 24 April 1948, the women and children of Qannir started to evacuate the village, apparently on [Arab] "orders from on high".

According to a dispatch sent by Fawzi al-Qawuqji to the [Arab] High Command, an enemy attack from Ein Hashofeit started on 0400 on 8 May towards Quannir and Kafr Quari. The attackers were supported by armored cars. According to al-Qawuqji the attack was "resisted and repelled", with a result of one killed and four wounded on the Palestinian side.

However, according to Haganah sources, the forces of the Alexandroni Brigade "raided the village on 9 May 1948, killed four Arabs and blew up 55 houses". According to Morris, the remaining villagers probably left at this time. Following the war the area was incorporated into the State of Israel, with the kibbutz of Regavim established on the village's former lands in 1949.

Khalidi described the place in 1992:

Stone rubble is strewn about the site, which is covered with thorns, fig trees, and cactus. Part of the adjacent land is used by Israelis as pasture and the other part is cultivated.

== Bibliography ==
- Barron, J.B., ed. (1923). Palestine: Report and General Abstracts of the Census of 1922. Government of Palestine.
- Conder, C.R.; Kitchener, H.H. (1882). The Survey of Western Palestine: Memoirs of the Topography, Orography, Hydrography, and Archaeology. Vol. 2. London: Committee of the Palestine Exploration Fund.
- Government of Palestine, Department of Statistics (1945). Village Statistics, April, 1945.
- Hadawi, S. (1970). Village Statistics of 1945: A Classification of Land and Area ownership in Palestine. Palestine Liberation Organization Research Center.
- Kallner, D.H. (1944). "Jacotin's Map of Palestine". Quarterly Statement - Palestine Exploration Fund. 76: 157–163. doi:10.1179/peq.1944.76.1.157.
- Karmon, Y. (1960). "An Analysis of Jacotin's Map of Palestine" (PDF). Israel Exploration Journal. 10 (3, 4): 155–173, 244–253. Archived from the original (PDF) on 22 December 2019.
- Khalidi, W. (1992). All That Remains: The Palestinian Villages Occupied and Depopulated by Israel in 1948. Washington D.C.: Institute for Palestine Studies. ISBN 0-88728-224-5.
- Mills, E., ed. (1932). Census of Palestine 1931. Population of Villages, Towns and Administrative Areas. Jerusalem: Government of Palestine.
- Morris, B. (2004). The Birth of the Palestinian Refugee Problem Revisited. Cambridge University Press. ISBN 978-0-521-00967-6.
- Palmer, E.H. (1881). The Survey of Western Palestine: Arabic and English Name Lists Collected During the Survey by Lieutenants Conder and Kitchener, R. E. Transliterated and Explained by E.H. Palmer. Committee of the Palestine Exploration Fund.
- al-Qawuqji, F. (1972): Memoirs of al-Qawuqji, Fauzi in Journal of Palestine Studies
  - "Memoirs, 1948, Part I" in 1, no. 4 (Sum. 72): 27-58., dpf-file, downloadable
  - , dpf-file, downloadable
- Schumacher, G. (1888). "Population list of the Liwa of Akka". Quarterly Statement - Palestine Exploration Fund. 20: 169–191.
