= USS Bowen =

1970 Knox-class frigate

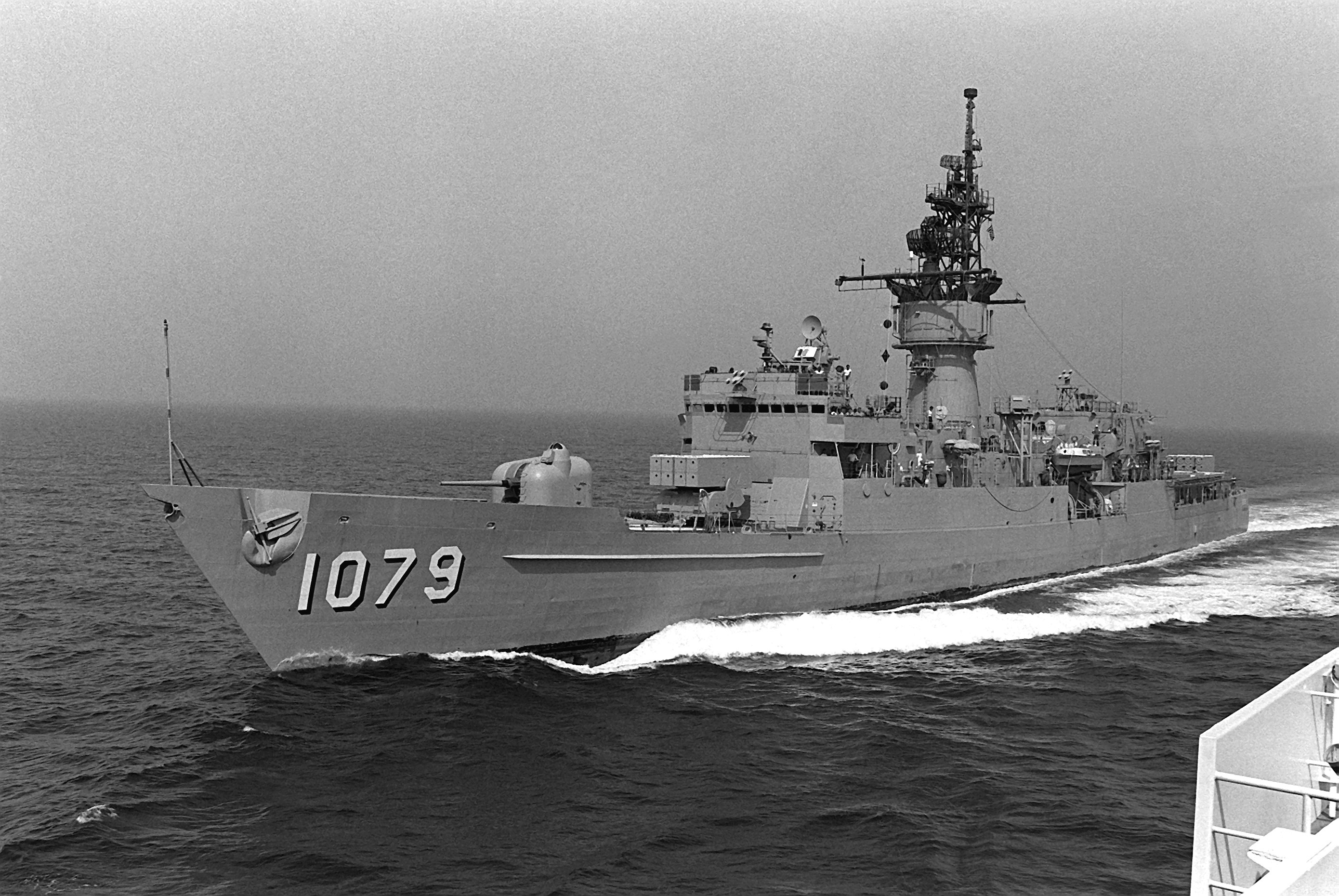
- USS Bowen (FF-1079)

History

United States
- Name: Bowen
- Namesake: Harold G. Bowen, Sr.
- Ordered: 25 August 1966
- Builder: Avondale Shipyard, Westwego, Louisiana
- Laid down: 11 July 1969
- Launched: 2 May 1970
- Acquired: 17 May 1971
- Commissioned: 22 May 1971
- Decommissioned: 30 June 1994
- Stricken: 11 January 1995
- Motto: Protect and Preserve
- Fate: Transferred to Turkey, 22 February 2002

Turkey
- Name: TCG Akdeniz
- Acquired: 30 June 1994
- Decommissioned: 2011
- Identification: F-257

General characteristics
- Class & type: Knox-class frigate
- Displacement: 3,220 tons (4,201 full load)
- Length: 438 ft 0 in (133.5 m)
- Beam: 46 ft 9 in (14.2 m)
- Draft: 24 ft 9 in (7.5 m)
- Propulsion: 2 × CE 1200 psi boilers; 1 Westinghouse geared turbine; 1 shaft, 35,000 shp (26,099 kW)
- Speed: over 27 knots (50 km/h; 31 mph)
- Complement: 18 officers, 267 enlisted
- Sensors & processing systems: AN/SPS-40 air search radar; AN/SPS-67 surface search radar; AN/SQS-26 sonar; AN/SQS-35 towed array sonar system; Mk68 gun fire control system
- Electronic warfare & decoys: AN/SLQ-32 electronics warfare system
- Armament: 1 × Mk-16 8 cell missile launcher for RUR-5 ASROC and Harpoon missiles; 1 × Mk-42 5-inch/54 caliber gun; Mark 46 torpedoes from four single tube launchers; 1 × Mk-25 BPDMS launcher for Sea Sparrow missiles
- Aircraft carried: 1 × SH-2 Seasprite (LAMPS I) helicopter

USS Bowen (DE-1079/FF-1079) was a Knox-class frigate of the United States Navy. She was named for Vice Admiral Harold G. Bowen, Sr. (1883–1965), former chief of the Naval Research Laboratory and the Office of Naval Research, who was deceased at the time of her commissioning. Admiral Bowen's son and namesake, Harold G. Bowen, Jr., who also retired as a vice admiral, presided over the U.S. Navy's 1969 inquiry into the Pueblo incident.

== Service history ==
Avondale Shipyard built Bowen in Westwego, Louisiana. Bowen was laid down on 11 July 1969 and launched on 2 May 1970. The frigate was delivered on 17 May 1971. She was commissioned on 22 May 1971.

Commanded by Commander Arthur Drennan, Bowen was part of the expeditionary force deployed off the coast of Beirut during the Lebanese Civil War. In early September 1983, United States Marines at the Beirut International Airport came under artillery fire. After repeated warnings, Bowen was ordered to fire in defense of the Marines. On 8 September 1983, Bowen opened fire with her 5-inch gun, destroying several artillery pieces and a fire control tower in the mountains, 9 miles (14 km) southeast of Beirut. Bowen's action received international media attention as the ship became the first warship to engage in hostile fire in the Mediterranean Sea since World War II. In all, Bowen made six firing runs, firing 75 shells at hostile targets. For their actions, Bowen's crew was awarded the Navy Unit Commendation, the Navy Expeditionary Medal and proudly adopted the slogan "First to Shoot in Beirut". In early October 1983, after one month on the "Gun Line", Bowen was relieved by the battleship USS New Jersey.

In 1992, Bowen was re-designated as a training ship, designated as a FFT and started training naval reservists. She was also converted to allow for the testing and evaluation of women aboard combatant ships. The successful program led to women being assigned to "Man of War" ships throughout the fleets.

Bowen was decommissioned on 30 June 1994 and struck from the Naval Vessel Register on 11 January 1995. She was immediately re-commissioned as the Akdeniz (F-257), of the Turkish Navy.

Bowen was disposed of through the Security Assistance Program (SAP), transferred, Foreign Assistance Act (FAA) Section 516, Southern Region Amendment, to Turkey 22 February 2002. She served there as Akdeniz (F-257) until 2011.
