= American Relief Expedition =

The American Relief Expedition was a private and public effort to return Europe-bound American citizens to the United States at the start of the First World War.

At the outbreak of the First World War, approximately 100,000 to 200,000 Americans were in Europe. The war led to a collapse of foreign credit and exchange that left many unable to purchase transport home.

Herbert Hoover, then a mining financier, along with several wealth Americans, established The American Committee In London to offer safe passage home to the United States. The committee set up in the Savoy Hotel ballroom and faced a constant stream of distressed Americans sent from the embassy. The main purpose of the committee was to exchange dollars for pounds at the pre-declaration of war rate, offer 10 shillings to those that had no money on hand, and to find temporarily housing.

The American government recognized the situation but was unwilling to immediately act. The use of United States Navy ships to traffic tourists was rejected as battleship hammocks were deemed unsuitable for women. It was settled that offering credit to purchase transport would be more acceptable. Franklin D. Roosevelt, acting as representative of the navy, organised the initial relief. USS Tennessee sailed from New York for duty in Europe through the first half of 1915 supporting the American Relief Expedition by carrying US$2.5 million in gold bullion and other resources to assist in the extraction of American refugees from war-ravaged Europe.

Ultimately, these actions were successful as over 100,000 Americans returned to the United States and The American Committee lost only 300 dollars of the some 1,500,000 it lent. Following this success Hoover, and through his new found ties to Walter Hines Page, would establish the Commission for Relief in Belgium.
