= Kevin M. McCoy =

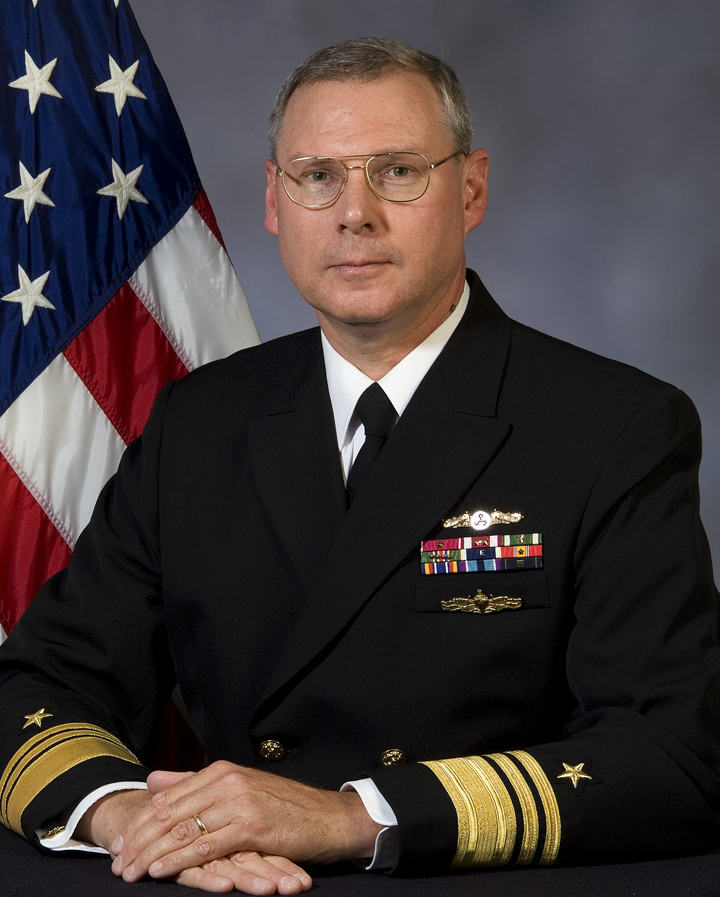
- Born: 1956 (age 69–70); Long Island, New York
- Military career
- Allegiance: American
- Branch: United States Navy
- Service years: 1978–2013
- Rank: Vice Admiral
- Commands: Naval Sea Systems Command
- Awards: Legion of Merit with Gold Star, Meritorious Service Medal with two Gold Stars, Navy Commendation Medal with Gold Star, Meritorious Unit Commendation, Battle Efficiency "E", Humanitarian Service Medal

Vice Admiral Kevin Michael McCoy (born 1956) is a native of Long Island, New York and joined the United States Navy in 1977. McCoy's last naval posting was as the 42nd commander of Naval Sea Systems Command. Since 2013 he is a President of Irving Shipbuilding Inc.

== Education ==
In May 1978, McCoy graduated from the State University of New York at Stony Brook with a Bachelor of Science Degree in Mechanical Engineering. In June 1989, McCoy earned a master's degree in Mechanical Engineering and an engineer's degree in Naval Engineering from the Massachusetts Institute of Technology. In May 1994 McCoy earned a master's degree in Business Administration Degree from Emory University.

== Service ==
In September 1978, McCoy began his career at Naval Reactors Headquarters and completed seven months of instruction at the Bettis Reactor Engineering School in West Mifflin, Pennsylvania. In October 1982, he attended the Submarine Officer's Basic Course in New London, Connecticut and reported to the ballistic missile submarine USS Daniel Webster in January 1983 as part of the Engineering Duty Officer Dolphin Program. In August 1983, McCoy reported to Mare Island Naval Shipyard and served as both a Nuclear and Non-Nuclear Ship Superintendent, as well as Shipyard Docking Officer, and completed submarine qualification.

McCoy served at Charleston Naval Shipyard from July 1989 through May 1994 while attending Emory University. In June 1994, McCoy relieved as Repair Officer aboard the submarine tender USS L. Y. Spear. He completed Surface Warfare qualification in June 1995 and in July 1996 he reported for duty as Officer-in-Charge of the Navy Maintenance Support Office in Norfolk, Virginia. There, he was Program Manager for the Advanced Industrial Management Program supporting the Shipyard and Naval Depot (NADEP) communities. In July 1998, McCoy reported to Puget Sound Naval Shipyard where he served as Business Officer and Operations Officer until June 2001. In October 2001, he became the 80th Commander of Portsmouth Naval Shipyard. In March 2004, he was selected for promotion to the rank of rear admiral (Lower Half). In November 2004, he was assigned as the Assistant Deputy Commander of Industrial Operations of the Naval Sea Systems Command, Washington Navy Yard, Washington, DC where he served as the NAVSEA Deputy Command for Ship Design, Integration and Engineering.

Upon selection to flag rank, McCoy served as assistant deputy commander of Industrial Operations of the Naval Sea Systems Command from 2004 to 2005. From 2005 to 2008, he served as the Naval Sea Systems Command's chief engineer. In June 2008, he was confirmed by the U.S. Senate for promotion to the rank of vice admiral and was assigned as the 42nd commander, Naval Sea Systems Command.

On July 1, 2010, McCoy presented 25 civilians with the Secretary of Defense Medal for the Global War on Terrorism for their direct support for counter-improvised explosive device efforts in Iraq and Afghanistan.

== Awards ==
In March 1997, at the rank of Commander, McCoy was awarded the Claud A. Jones Award from the American Society of Naval Engineers as "Fleet Engineer of the Year" during his tour on board USS L. Y. Spear. Vice Admiral Kevin M. McCoy is entitled to wear:

- Legion of Merit, with Gold Star
- Meritorious Service Medal, with two Gold Stars
- Navy Commendation Medal, with Gold Star
- Meritorious Unit Commendation
- Battle Efficiency "E"
- Humanitarian Service Medal
- and other awards.

== Personal life ==
McCoy is the father of Mary McCoy who gained notoriety in April 2014 when a video of her performing a song at a marketing conference went viral on social media.
