= Claud Elliott Lake Provincial Park =

Provincial park in British Columbia, Canada

- IUCN category II (national park)
- Location within Vancouver Island Location within British Columbia
- Interactive map of Claud Elliott Lake Provincial Park
- Location: Rupert Land District, British Columbia, Canada
- Nearest city: Ashcroft, BC
- Coordinates: 50°19′14″N 126°33′24″W
- Area: 328 ha (810 acres)
- Established: July 13, 1995
- Governing body: BC Parks

Claud Elliott Provincial Park is a provincial park in British Columbia, Canada located on northern Vancouver Island approximately 50 kilometres (31 mi) southeast of Port McNeill, between the Tsitsika River and Bonanza Lake, near the community of Woss.

The park was established in 1995, comprising 289 hectares. Its boundary was extended in 2004 to a current total area of approximately 328 hectares.

== Name origin ==
Claud Elliott Lake and Claud Elliott Creek were named for a Mr. Claud Elliott who was born in Lincoln County, Upper Canada in 1859. Of United Empire Loyalist stock, the family moved to Bruce County. He came to BC in June 1891 and in the summer of 1902 visited the north end of Vancouver Island for the first time. He became closely involved with this location, cruising and selling timber lands in this area and later serving as alderman for the City of Vancouver. He died in November 1929.

== See also ==
- Claud Elliott Creek Ecological Reserve
