= Claud Elliott Creek Ecological Reserve =

British Columbia protected area

Coordinates: 50°19′30″N 126°33′50″W

The Claud Elliott Creek Ecological Reserve is located southwest of the junction of Claud Elliott Creek and the Tsitsika River on northern Vancouver Island, southwest of the community of Sayward. The reserve, which was created to protect representative old-growth montane forests, was established in 1989, comprising approximately 231 hectares. It was expanded slightly in 2004 to a current total area of approximately 233 hectares.

== Name origin ==
Claud Elliott Lake and Claud Elliott Creek were named for a Mr. Claud Elliott who was born in Lincoln County, Upper Canada in 1859. Of United Empire Loyalist] stock, the family moved to Bruce County. He came to BC in June 1891 and in the summer of 1902 visited the north end of Vancouver Island for the first time. He became closely involved with this location, cruising and selling of timber lands in this area. Later served as alderman for City of Vancouver and died in November 1929.

== See also ==
- Claud Elliott Lake Provincial Park
