= Regavim =

Regavim: Hebrew: רְגָבִים (Hebrew)
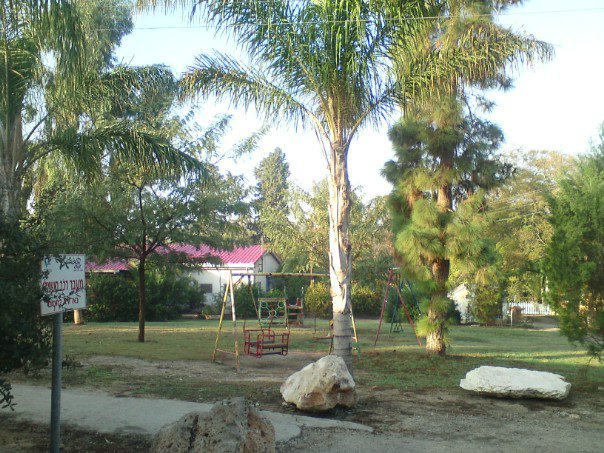
- Etymology: Clods
- Location within Haifa region of Israel
- Coordinates: 32°31′26″N 35°2′4″E
- Country: Israel
- District: Haifa
- Subdistrict: Hadera
- Council: Menashe
- Affiliation: Kibbutz Movement
- Founded: 1947
- Founder: Italian and Algerian Habonim Dror members
- Population (2024): 671
- Website: www.regavim.co.il

Regavim (Hebrew: רְגָבִים) is a kibbutz in northern Israel. Located near Umm al-Fahm, it falls under the jurisdiction of Menashe Regional Council. In 2024 it had a population of 671.

== Etymology ==
The name Regavim is taken from the Hebrew word 'regev', meaning a very small piece of land or patch of soil, a word used in a Zionist poem about reclaiming the Land of Israel, "dunam by dunam, regev by regev."

== History ==
The kibbutz group was established in 1947 by immigrants from Italy and North Africa who were members of the Habonim Dror youth movement. They first settled on the land of the depopulated village of al-Butaymat in July 1948, (of which 55 percent of the land was already owned by Jews in 1945), before moving to the land of another depopulated Palestinian village, Qannir, in 1949.
