= First Presbyterian Church (Vallejo, California) =

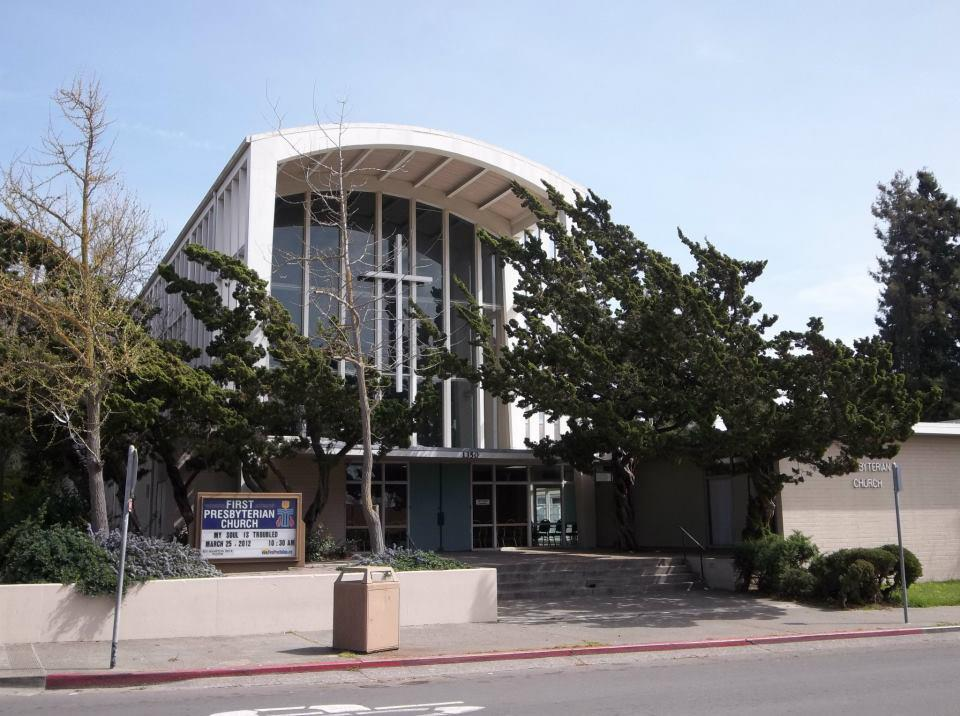

- Location within California
- 38°6′49″N 122°16′6″W
- Location: Vallejo, California
- Country: USA
- Denomination: Presbyterian
- Website: www.firstpresvallejo.org

History
- Founded: 1862

Architecture
- Completed: 1954

Specifications
- Capacity: 350

The First Presbyterian Church in Vallejo is a historic church in Vallejo, California.

Founded in 1862 as an Old School congregation during the Old School–New School Controversy, it is now part of the Presbyterian Church (USA)'s Presbytery of the Redwoods. In 1954, the congregation consecrated the current building, which houses classrooms, offices, an auditorium, a social hall, a chapel, and a sanctuary.

The building hosts programs for students at Vallejo Middle School, and also serves as seasonal concert space for the Vallejo Choral Society.

The congregation is part of a group of Solano County and Napa County institutions that make up a local chapter of the Industrial Areas Foundation.

== Ministers ==
The first minister of the church was Nathaniel Klink, a pastor who graduated from Princeton Theological Seminary in May 1851. He was the stated supply for the congregation: he was not installed by the congregation as pastor, but was assigned by the presbytery to preach at the church.
