= USS Claud Jones =

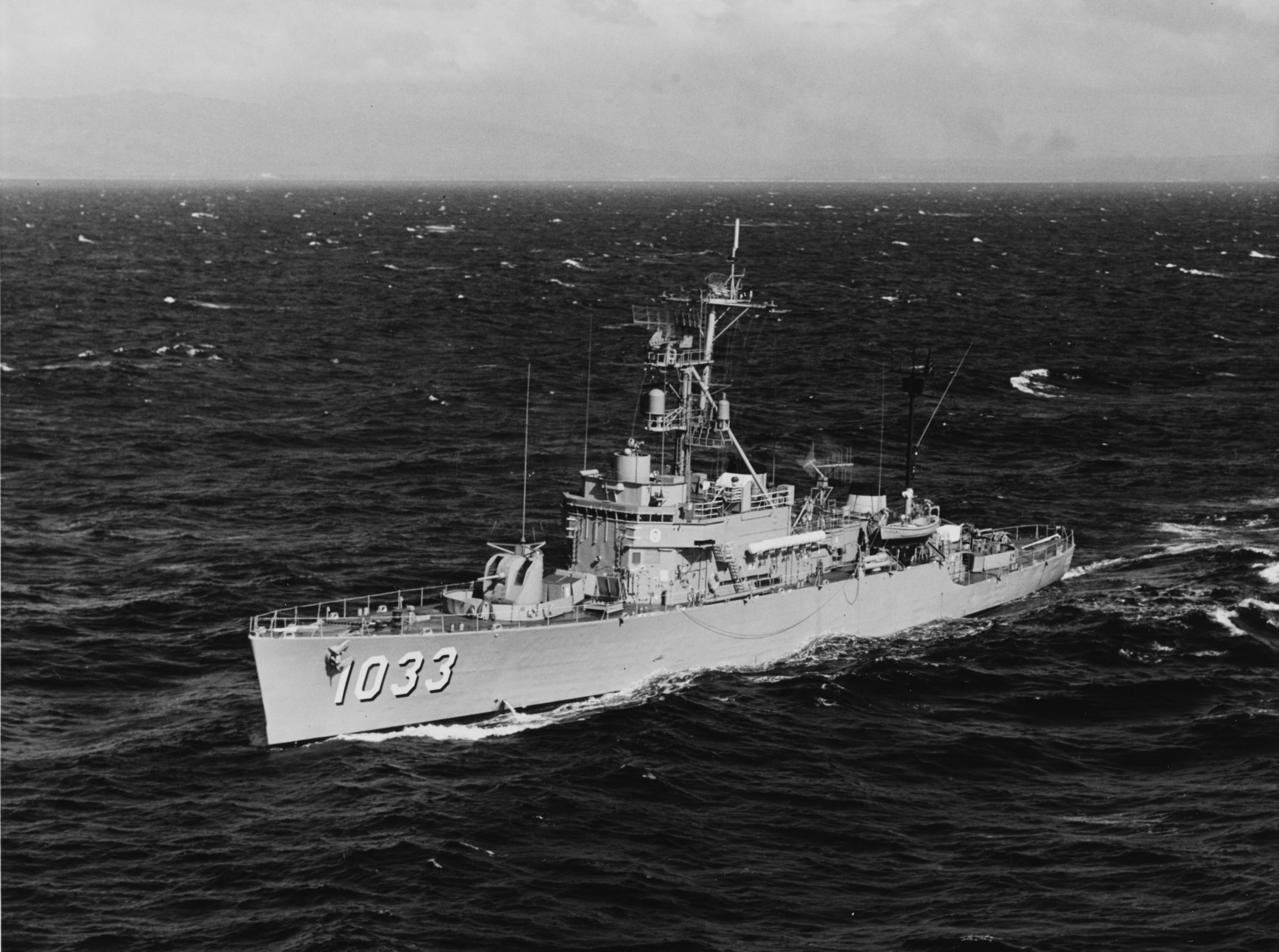
- USS Claud Jones (DE-1033)

History

United States
- Name: USS Claud Jones (DE-1033)
- Namesake: Claud Ashton Jones
- Builder: Avondale Marine Ways, Avondale, Louisiana
- Launched: 27 May 1958
- Sponsored by: Mrs. M. R. J. Wyllie
- Commissioned: 10 February 1959
- Stricken: 16 December 1974
- Fate: Sold to Indonesia, 1 December 1974

Indonesia
- Name: KRI Mongisidi (343)
- Namesake: Robert Wolter Mongisidi
- Acquired: 1 December 1974
- Decommissioned: January 2003
- Status: Decommissioned; awaiting disposal

General characteristics
- Type: Destroyer escort
- Displacement: 1,314 long tons (1,335 t) standard; 1,970 long tons (2,000 t) full load
- Length: 312 ft (95 m)
- Beam: 38 ft 10 in (11.84 m)
- Draft: 12 ft 1 in (3.68 m)
- Propulsion: 4 × Fairbanks-Morse 38ND8 Diesels; 9,240 shp; 7,000 bhp; 1 shaft
- Speed: 20–22 knots (37–41 km/h)
- Range: 7,000 nmi (13,000 km) at 12 kn (22 km/h)
- Complement: 171 total: 12 Officers; 159 enlisted men
- Electronic warfare & decoys: AN/SPS-6E-2D air search radar
- Armament: 2 × 3"/50 caliber guns (2 × 1); 6 × 12.75 in (324 mm) Mk.32 torpedo tubes (2 × 3); 2 × Hedgehog anti-submarine mortar

For information about this ship's class, see Claud Jones-class destroyer escort

USS Claud Jones (DE-1033) was launched 27 May 1958 by Avondale Marine Ways, Avondale, Louisiana, sponsored by Mrs. M. R. J. Wyllie; and commissioned 10 February 1959, Lieutenant Commander W. M. Cone in command. The ship was named for Claud Ashton Jones.

After training at Guantanamo Bay, Cuba, Claud Jones cruised to northern Europe between June and August 1959, returning to Key West, Florida, her home port. During 1960, she operated along the east coast and in the Caribbean, with a voyage to northern European waters during NATO exercises in September and October.
