= Claude =

Claude most commonly refers to:

- Claude (AI), a family of large language models by Anthropic
- Claude (given name), French-language unisex given name
- Claude (surname)
  - Claude Lorrain (c. 1600–1682), French landscape painter, draughtsman and etcher traditionally called just "Claude" in English

Claude may also refer to:

== Places ==
- Claude, Texas, a city
- Claude, West Virginia, an unincorporated community

== Other uses ==
- Allied reporting name of the Mitsubishi A5M Japanese carrier-based fighter aircraft
- Claude (alligator), an albino alligator at the California Academy of Sciences
- Claude's syndrome, a form of brainstem stroke syndrome

== See also ==
- Claud, a given name
