= USS Tennessee (ACR-10) =

US Navy armored cruiser

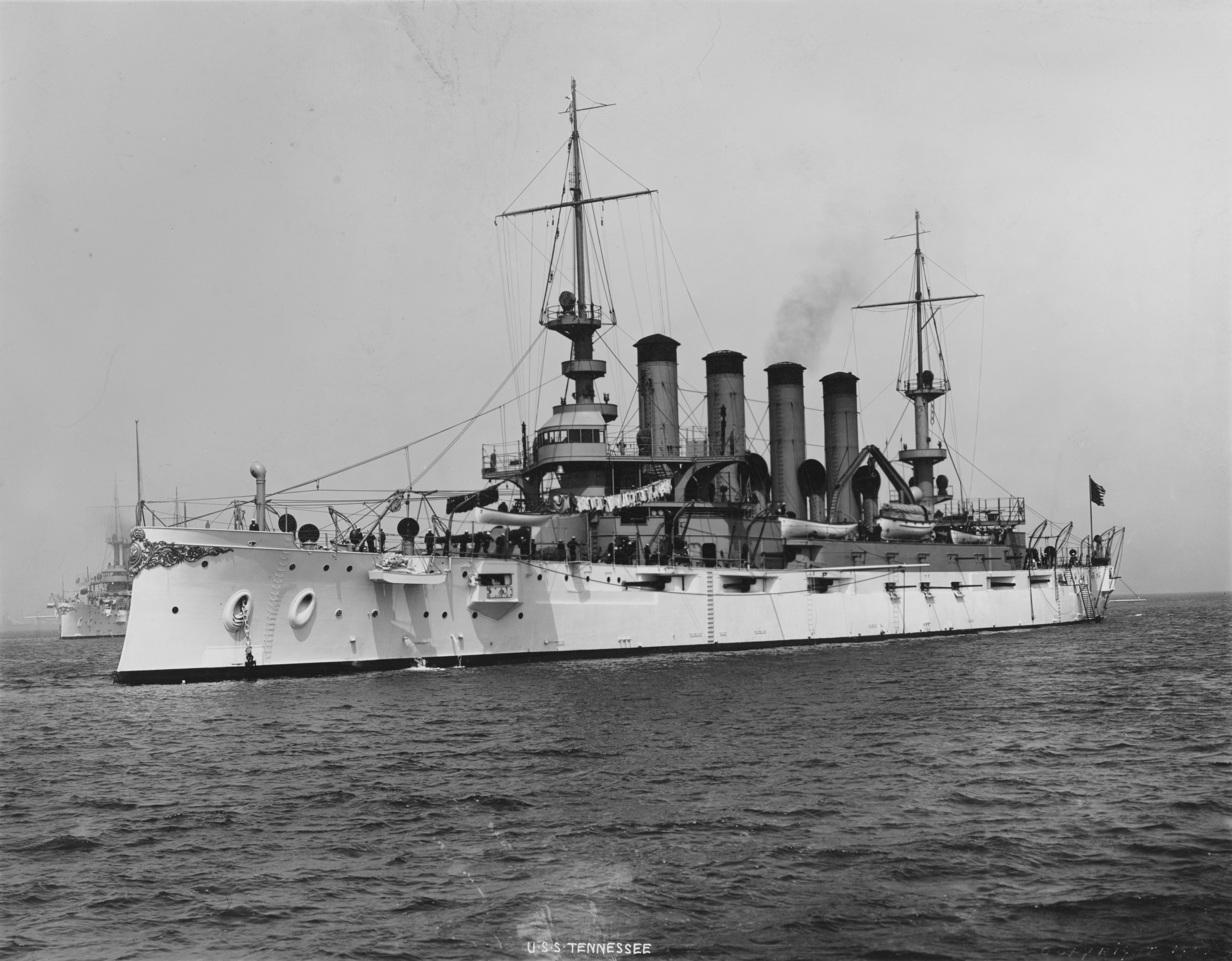
- USS Tennessee (ACR-10), at anchor c. 1907

History

United States
- Name: Tennessee (1903–1916); Memphis (1916)
- Namesake: State of Tennessee; City of Memphis, Tennessee
- Ordered: 1 July 1902
- Awarded: 9 February 1903
- Builder: William Cramp & Sons, Philadelphia
- Cost: $4,035,000 (contract price of hull and machinery)
- Yard number: 322
- Laid down: 20 June 1903
- Launched: 3 December 1904
- Sponsored by: Miss Annie K. Frazier
- Commissioned: 17 July 1906
- Renamed: Memphis, 25 May 1916
- Stricken: 17 December 1917
- Identification: Hull symbol: ACR-10
- Fate: Wrecked, 29 August 1916; Sold for scrap, 17 January 1922

General characteristics
- Class & type: Tennessee-class armored cruiser
- Displacement: 14,500 long tons (14,733 t) (standard); 15,712 long tons (15,964 t) (full load)
- Length: 504 ft 5 in (153.75 m) oa; 502 ft (153 m) pp
- Beam: 72 ft 10 1/2 in (22.212 m)
- Draft: 25 ft (7.6 m) (mean)
- Installed power: 16 × Babcock & Wilcox boilers; 23,000 ihp (17,000 kW)
- Propulsion: 2 × vertical triple expansion reciprocating engines; 2 × screws
- Speed: 22 knots (41 km/h; 25 mph); 22.16 knots (41.04 km/h; 25.50 mph) (Speed on Trial)
- Complement: 83 officers, 804 enlisted, 64 marines
- Armament: 4 × 10 in (250 mm)/40 caliber Mark 3 breech-loading rifles (2x2); 16 × 6 in (150 mm)/50 caliber Mark 8 breech-loading rifles (16x1); 22 × 3 in (76 mm)/50 caliber rapid-fire guns (22x1); 4 × 3-pounder (47 mm (1.9 in)) Driggs-Schroeder saluting guns; 4 × 21 inch (533 mm) submerged torpedo tubes
- Armor: Belt: 5 in (13 cm); Deck: 1 1/2–4 in (38–102 mm) (amidships); 3 in (76 mm) (forward & aft); Barbettes: 4–7 in (100–180 mm); Turrets: 5–9 in (130–230 mm); Conning Tower: 9 in (230 mm)

The USS Tennessee (ACR-10), also referred to as "Armored Cruiser No. 10", and later renamed Memphis, was a United States Navy armored cruiser, the lead ship of her class.

== Construction and commissioning ==
Tennessee was laid down by the Cramp Shipbuilding Company of Philadelphia, Pennsylvania, on 20 June 1903, launched on 3 December 1904, sponsored by Annie K. Frazier (daughter of Governor James B. Frazier of Tennessee and later the foundress of the Society of Sponsors of the United States Navy), and commissioned at the Philadelphia Navy Yard on 17 July 1906, Captain Albert Gleaves Berry in command.

== Operational career ==
The new armored cruiser departed Hampton Roads on 8 November 1906 as escort for Louisiana in which President Theodore Roosevelt had embarked for a cruise to Panama to check on the progress of work constructing the Panama Canal. After a brief visit to Puerto Rico on the return voyage, the warships arrived back at Hampton Roads on 26 November.

Following a yard period for repairs, Tennessee left Hampton Roads on 16 April 1907 for the Jamestown Exposition, held from 7 to 11 June 1907, to commemorate the tricentennial of the founding of the first English settlement in America.

On 14 June, Tennessee sailed for Europe in company with Washington and reached Royan, France on the 23rd for duty with the Special Service Squadron. She returned home in August but departed Hampton Roads on 12 October for the Pacific, where she became flagship for the second division of the Pacific Fleet.

Tennessee then patrolled off the California coast until 24 August 1908 but suffered a boiler tube explosion on 5 June, which killed seven men, while steaming at full speed. The explosion occurred just after the rear admiral in charge of the squadron had visited on a tour of inspection; had the explosion taken place a few minutes earlier, he might have been among the casualties. Since the ship's 16 boilers were sub-divided into separate watertight compartments, the rest of the engineering section was not affected. Once repairs had been made and her tour had ended, Tennessee sailed for Samoa, arriving at Pago Pago on 23 September to resume service with the Pacific Fleet. On 15 May 1910, she arrived at Bahía Blanca to represent the United States at the centenary celebration of the independence of Argentina.

On 8 November 1910, the armored cruiser departed Portsmouth, New Hampshire, (Note: While at Portsmouth, a football team from the ship played the 1910 New Hampshire football team. Contested on 22 October in Durham, New Hampshire, the ship's team was defeated, 41–0.) and proceeded to Charleston, South Carolina, to embark President William Howard Taft for a round trip voyage to Panama to inspect further progress on the canal. She returned to Hampton Roads on 22 November and then engaged in battle practice off the Virginia coast into February 1911. Following a Mardi Gras visit to New Orleans and a visit to New York City early in March, the ship steamed to Cuban waters for two months of operations out of Guantanamo Bay.

Placed in reserve at the Portsmouth Navy Yard on 15 June 1911, she remained on the east coast for 18 months before departing Philadelphia on 12 November 1912 for the Mediterranean. Arriving off Smyrna (now İzmir), Turkey on 1 December, she remained there protecting American citizens and property during the First Balkan War until 3 May 1913, when she headed home. After reaching Hampton Roads on the 23rd, Tennessee operated on the East Coast until entering the Atlantic Reserve Fleet at Philadelphia on 23 October. On 2 May 1914, she became receiving ship at the New York Navy Yard.

On 4 November, Tennessee arrived in Beirut, what was then Syria, to protect the Christian population there in case of attack by Syrian Muslims.

On 6 August, Tennessee sailed from New York for duty in Europe through the first half of 1915 supporting the American Relief Expedition by carrying gold bullion and other resources to assist in the extraction of American refugees from war-ravaged Europe. In August, she transported the 1st Regiment, Marine Expeditionary Force, and the Marine Artillery Battalion to Haiti. From 28 January-24 February 1916, the cruiser served as flagship of a cruiser squadron off Port-au-Prince, Haiti. In March, she embarked a group of dignitaries at Hampton Roads for a two-month, round trip cruise to Montevideo, Uruguay.

On 25 May 1916, Tennessee was renamed Memphis, honoring the city of Memphis, Tennessee, so that the name "Tennessee" could be reassigned to the new battleship Tennessee (BB-43).

In July 1916, under the command of Captain Edward L. Beach, Sr., the ship got underway for the Caribbean arriving at Santo Domingo on 23 July for peace-keeping patrol off the rebellion-torn Dominican Republic.

== Loss ==
Memphis was at anchor .5 nmi (0.58 mi; 930 m) off a rocky beach in 45 ft (14 m) of water in the harbor of Santo Domingo on the afternoon of 29 August 1916 with two of her 16 boilers operating in case she needed to get underway; the gunboat Castine also was anchored in the harbor. Shortly after 12:00, Memphis began to roll heavily and Captain Beach observed an unexpected heavy swell developing. Memphis and Castine both made preparations to leave the harbor and began to raise steam; Memphis expected to be able to get underway at about 16:35.

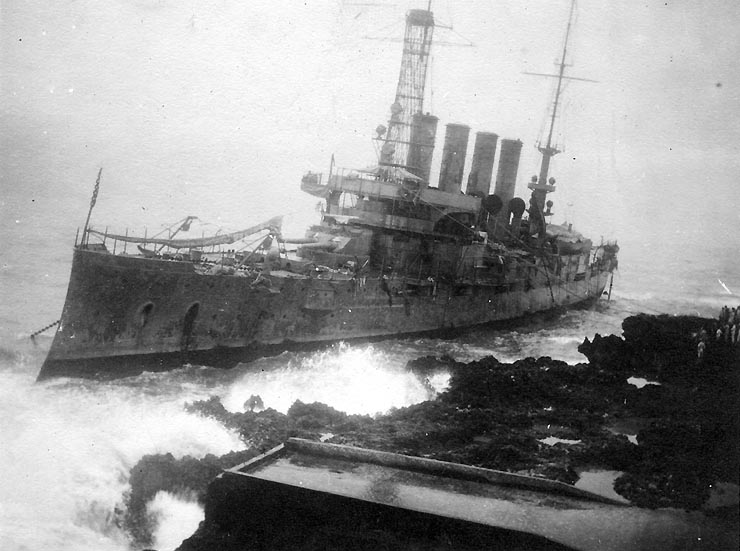
The wreck of Memphis at Santo Domingo on 29 August 1916.

Conditions in the harbor had deteriorated badly by 15:45, when Memphis sighted an approaching 75 ft (23 m) wave of yellow water stretching along the entire horizon. By 16:00, the wave was closer, had turned ochre in color, and had reached about 100 ft (30 m) in height; at the same time, Memphis was rolling 45°, so heavily that large amounts of water cascaded into the ship via her gun ports and water even was entering the ship via ventilators 50 ft (15 m) above the waterline. By 16:25, water began to enter the ship via her funnels, 70 ft (21 m) above the waterline, putting out the fires in her boilers and preventing her from raising enough steam to get underway. She began to strike the rocky harbor bottom at 16:40, damaging her propellers just as she was raising enough steam to begin moving, and her engines lost steam pressure.

At about this time, the giant wave Memphis had seen approaching over the past hour arrived; she rolled into a deep trough and was struck immediately by what proved to be three very large waves in rapid succession, the highest of them estimated by the crew to have been 70 ft (21 m) in height, completely swamping her except for her highest points, and washing crewmen overboard. The waves rolled her heavily, caused her to strike the harbor bottom, then pushed her to the beach .5 nmi (0.58 mi; 0.93 km) away. By 17:00, she had been driven under cliffs along the coast of the harbor and was resting on the harbor bottom. She was battered into a complete wreck in 90 minutes. Castine, meanwhile, managed to reach safer waters by getting underway and putting to sea through the large waves, although damaged by them and at times in danger of capsizing. (Note: For a description of the loss of Memphis, see Smith, pp. 67–70.)

Memphis's casualties numbered 43 men dead or missing – 10 of them washed overboard by the waves or killed by steam as the ship's powerplant broke up, another 25 lost as they returned from shore leave in the ship's motor launch and were caught in the harbor by the huge breakers, and eight more lost in three boats wrecked after dark as they attempted to reach shore – and 204 badly injured. Due to their heroic actions during this incident, Chief Machinist's Mate George William Rud, Lieutenant Claud Ashton Jones, and Machinist Charles H. Willey were awarded the Medal of Honor.

George Rud

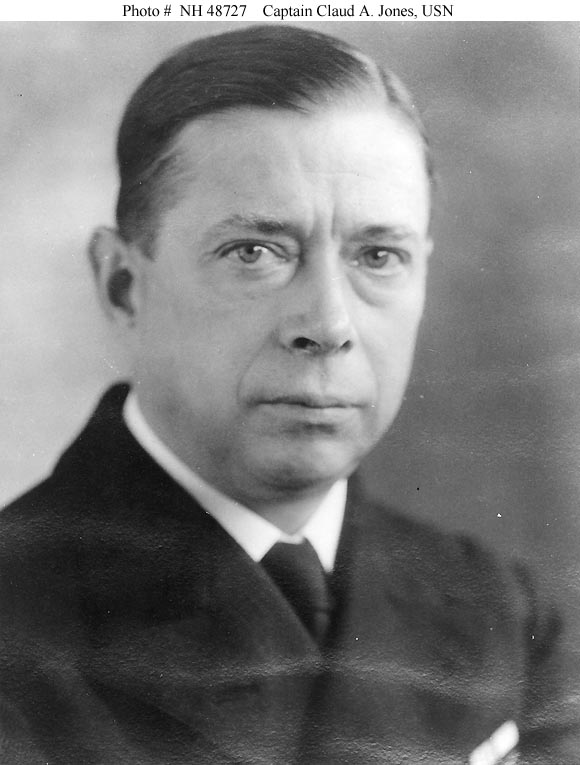
Claud Jones

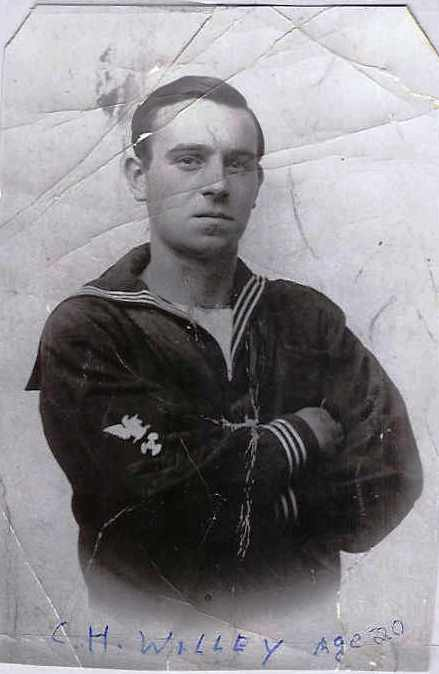
Charles H. Willey

=== Alternative explanations for the wreck ===
In his 1966 account of the incident, The Wreck of the Memphis, Captain Beach's son, Edward L. Beach Jr., ascribed her loss to an unexpected tsunami exceeding 100 ft (30 m) in height, and this explanation has been carried forward by most sources discussing her loss. (Note: See, for example, Gardiner, Robert, ed., Conway's All the World's Fighting Ships 1860–1905, New York: Mayflower Books, Inc., 1979, ISBN 0-8317-0302-4, p. 149, for another citation of the 100-foot tsunami explanation.) More recent research, however, has called this explanation into question. No record of any seismic event in the Caribbean on 29 August 1916 that could have triggered a tsunami has been found, and the rate of advance of the large wave Memphis reported – about an hour to cross the distance from the horizon to the ship – matches that of a wind-generated ocean wave (possibly a rogue wave); a tsunami, in contrast, would have covered the distance in only a few minutes. The periods of the three large waves that struck Memphis also are characteristic of large wind-generated waves rather than tsunamis. (Note: For a discussion of the lack of evidence for a tsunami and the more compelling evidence for freak wind-generated waves having wrecked Memphis, see Smith, pp. 68–69.)

A likely source for such large, wind-generated waves in Santo Domingo Harbor on 29 August 1916 does exist, in that three hurricanes active in the Caribbean between 12 August and 2 September 1916 passed westward just to the south. Waves generated from these storms could well have combined to create a large wave like those that struck and wrecked Memphis. Such a circumstance appears to explain the loss of the ship better than the tsunami theory. Oceanographer Dr. George Pararas-Carayannis in particular published an extensively detailed rebuttal demonstrating that a tsunami could not have caused the foundering of Memphis, but that the last of the three hurricanes, category 1 Hurricane Eight, likely did, creating a 59 ft (18 m) wave that reached a breaker height of 90 ft (27 m) as it approached Memphis. This swamped the cruiser, anchored in only 55 ft (17 m) of water, and would have done so even had the ship been at full maneuvering power. Pararas-Carayannis concluded that had Memphis been anchored in 100 to 120 ft (30 to 37 m) of water, she would have ridden out the swells, including the killer wave.

== Salvage efforts ==
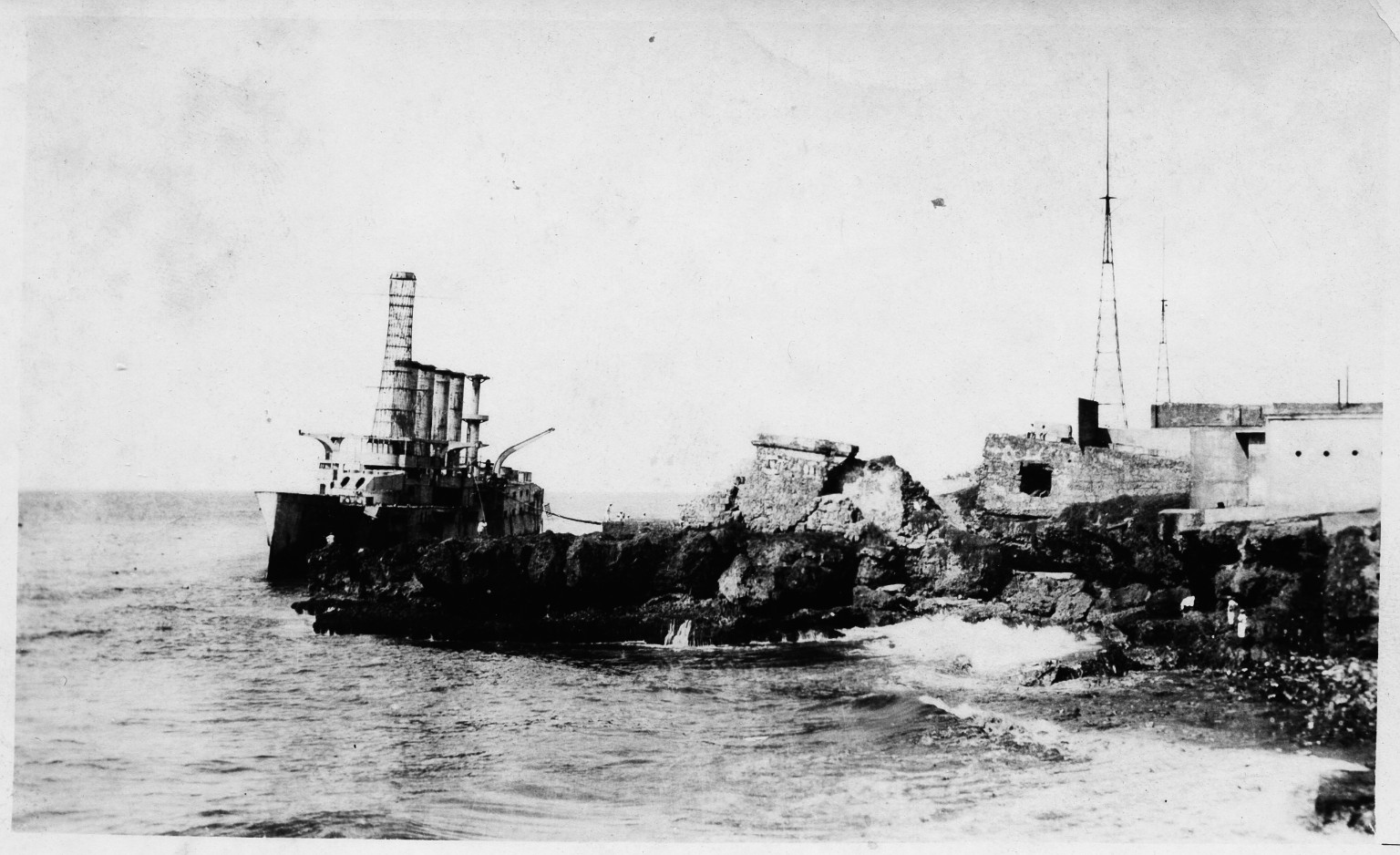
Wreck of Memphis after being stripped of essentials, 1922

Although Memphis came to rest upright and appeared relatively undamaged above the waterline, it was apparent as early as the day after the disaster that she was not worth repairing; she was outdated by 1916, she had suffered the destruction of her propulsion plant and severe distortion of her hull structure, and her bottom had been driven in. Accordingly, the United States Department of the Navy assigned the crew of the battleship New Hampshire, or the wrecking vessel Henlopen, to strip her of her guns, supplies, and equipment for use on other ships. New Hampshire's crew left Memphis without her guns, with much of her topside gear missing, and with her gun turrets rotated off the centerline.

Memphis's ship's bell was presented to a local church as a gesture of thanks to citizens of Santo Domingo who had helped to rescue the ship's crew.

== Final disposition ==
Memphis was struck from the Naval Vessel Register on 17 December 1917 and sold to the A. H. Radetsky Iron and Metal Company of Denver, Colorado, on 17 January 1922 for scrapping for the sum of $3,000 (US$ 88,800 in 2025). Scrapped on site, her wreck proved difficult to dismantle, and the last of it did not disappear from the Santo Domingo shoreline until 1938.

Her bronze bow scrollwork, removed approximately 1909, is on display on a concrete mockup of her bow in Nashville, Tennessee's Centennial Park.

== Sources ==
- Author not listed, "The Tennessee Accident." In "Service Items," The Navy (Washington DC: Navy Publishing Company), June 1908. Retrieved 18 April 2012.
- Alden, John D. American Steel Navy: A Photographic History of the U.S. Navy from the Introduction of the Steel Hull in 1883 to the Cruise of the Great White Fleet. Annapolis, Maryland: Naval Institute Press, 1989. ISBN 0-87021-248-6
- Beach, Edward L., Jr. The Wreck of the Memphis. New York, New York: Holt, Rinear, and Wiston, 1966. Naval Institute Press Classics of Naval Literature 1998 re-print ISBN 1-55750-070-3
- Friedman, Norman. U.S. Cruisers: An Illustrated Design History. Annapolis, Maryland: Naval Institute Press, 1984. ISBN 0-87021-718-6
- Musicant, Ivan. U.S. Armored Cruisers: A Design and Operational History. Annapolis, Maryland: Naval Institute Press, 1985. ISBN 0-87021-714-3
- Smith, Craig B. Extreme Waves. Washington, D.C.: Joseph Henry Press, 2006. ISBN 0-309-10062-3.
- Taylor, Michael J.H. (1990). Jane's Fighting Ships of World War I. Studio. ISBN 1-85170-378-0.
