= Claud Ashton Jones =

US Navy officer and Medal of Honor recipient (1885–1948)

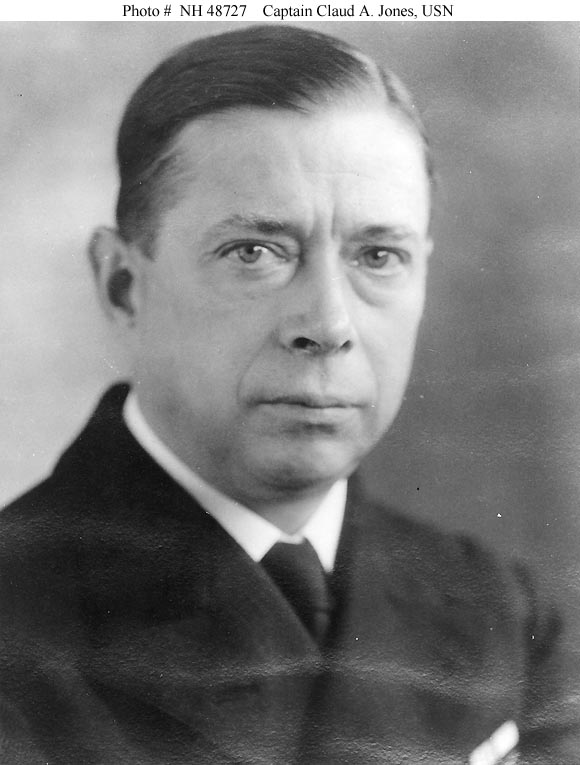
- Born: October 7, 1885; Fire Creek, West Virginia, U.S.
- Died: August 8, 1948 (aged 62); Charleston, West Virginia, U.S.
- Burial place: Arlington National Cemetery, Arlington County, Virginia, U.S.
- Military career
- Allegiance: United States of America
- Branch: United States Navy
- Service years: 1907–1946
- Rank: Rear admiral
- Conflicts: World War I World War II
- Awards: Medal of Honor; Legion of Merit

Claud Ashton Jones (October 7, 1885 – August 8, 1948) was a Rear Admiral in the United States Navy, and a Medal of Honor recipient.

== Biography ==
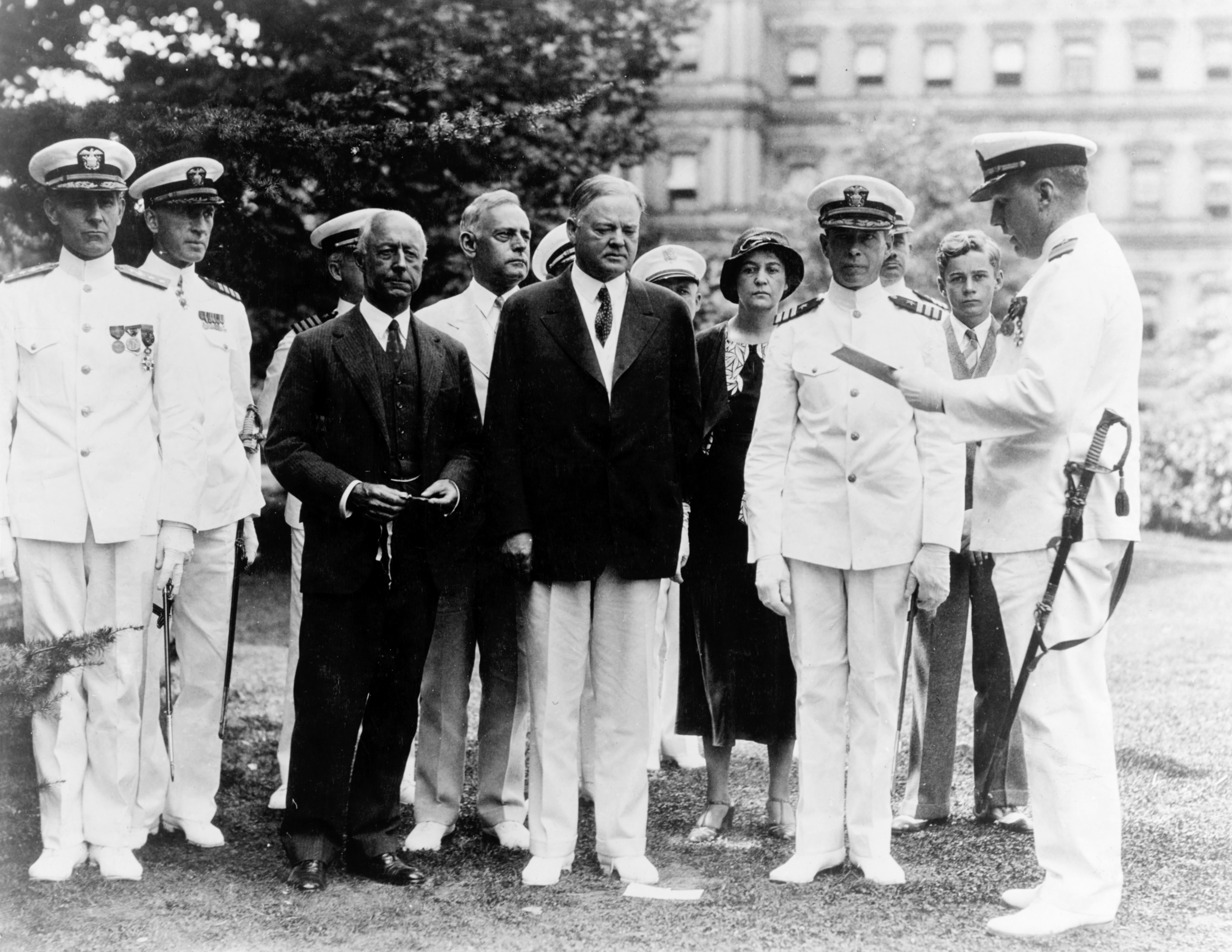
Jones receiving the Medal of Honor, August 1, 1932

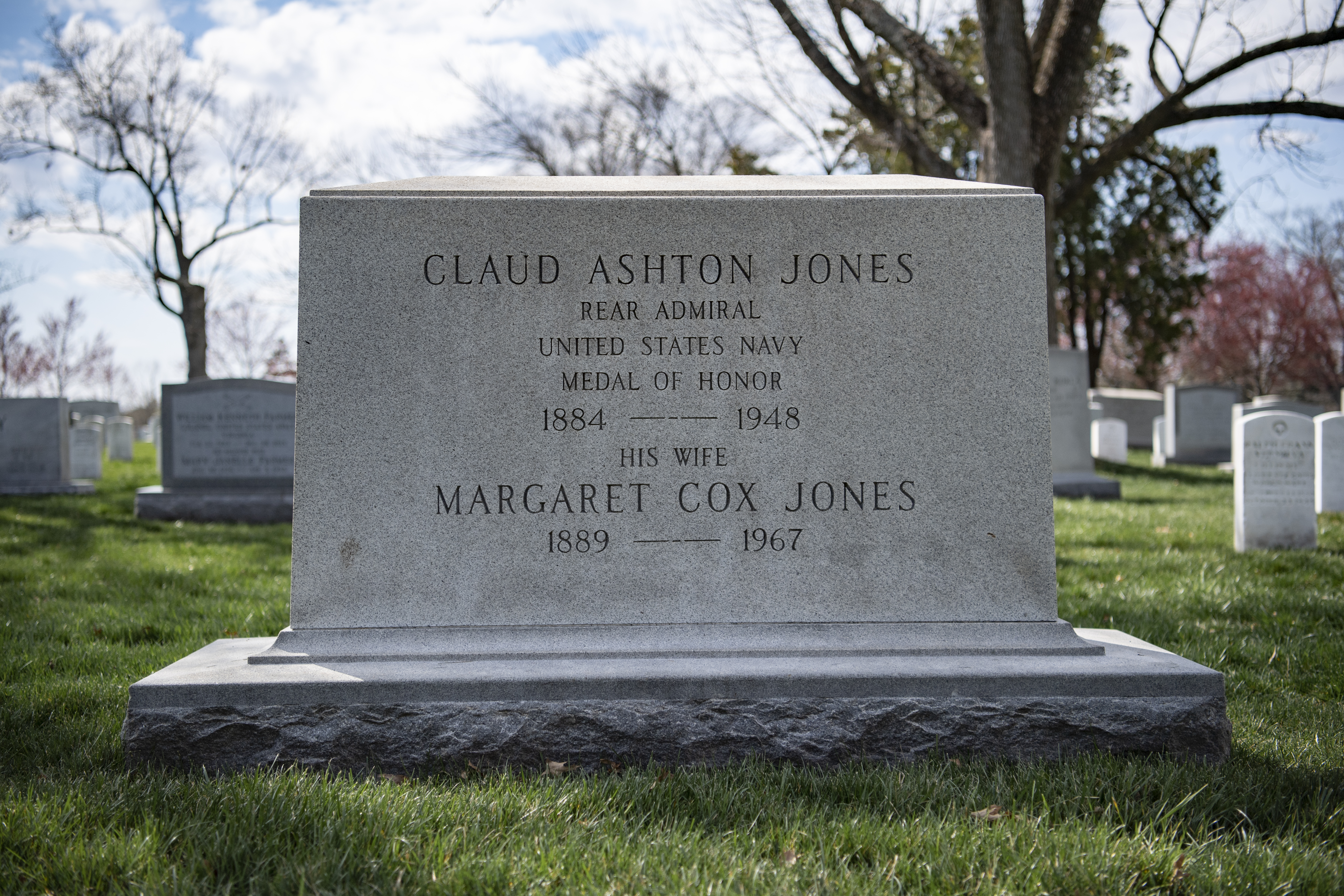
Grave at Arlington National Cemetery

Born in Fire Creek, West Virginia, he graduated from the Naval Academy in 1907, and after several years of duty at sea, did graduate study leading to a master of science degree at Harvard University.

He was awarded the Medal of Honor for his heroism while serving as engineering officer on USS Memphis (CA-10) when his ship was wrecked by a wind-driven tsunami off Santo Domingo City August 29, 1916. Most of his remaining service was in engineering billets ashore and afloat, with a tour of duty as assistant naval attache at London.

As Rear Admiral from October 9, 1941, he served in the Bureau of Ships throughout World War II, working in the shipbuilding program, and as an assistant chief of the bureau. For his exceptionally meritorious service he was awarded the Legion of Merit. In addition, he was awarded the honorary degree of Doctor of Science by West Virginia University on May 18, 1942.

Rear Admiral Jones died in Charleston, West Virginia, August 8, 1948. He is buried at Arlington National Cemetery, Arlington, Virginia.

== Medal of Honor citation ==
Rank and organization: Commander, United States Navy. Born: October 7, 1885, Fire Creek, W.Va. Accredited to: West Virginia. (August 1, 1932.)

Citation:

For extraordinary heroism in the line of his profession as a senior engineer officer on board the U.S.S. Memphis, at a time when the vessel was suffering total destruction from a hurricane while anchored off Santo Domingo City, August 29, 1916. Lt. Jones did everything possible to get the engines and boilers ready, and if the elements that burst upon the vessel had delayed for a few minutes, the engines would have saved the vessel. With boilers and steampipes bursting about him in clouds of scalding steam, with thousands of tons of water coming down upon him and in almost complete darkness, Lt. Jones nobly remained at his post as long as the engines would turn over, exhibiting the most supreme unselfish heroism which inspired the officers and men who were with him. When the boilers exploded, Lt. Jones, accompanied by 2 of his shipmates, rushed into the firerooms and drove the men there out, dragging some, carrying others to the engineroom, where there was air to be breathed instead of steam. Lt. Jones' action on this occasion was above and beyond the call of duty.

== Namesake ==
The ship USS Claud Jones (DE-1033) was named for him, the lead ship of four, of a class of ocean escorts.

The Claud A. Jones Award is an award presented annually by the American Society of Naval Engineers since 1987 to a fleet or field engineer, who has made significant contributions to improving operational engineering or material readiness of the maritime forces of the United States. Jones served as president of the Society in 1941.

== Personal ==
Jones was married to Margaret Cox Jones (November 15, 1890 – April 20, 1967). They had a son and a daughter. His daughter Margaret "Peggy" Jones Wyllie (February 27, 1924 – July 13, 2016) served as the sponsor for USS Claud Jones. His wife and son are buried with him in Arlington National Cemetery.

His son Frank Cox Jones (February 9, 1917 – August 8, 2004) followed in his footsteps as an engineering officer. Frank Jones graduated from the United States Naval Academy in 1938, was himself promoted to rear admiral in 1965, and served as president of the American Society of Naval Engineers from 1968 to 1969 before retiring from active duty in 1974. Since 2006, the Society has presented the annual Frank C. Jones Award for major maintenance and alteration achievements.

== See also ==
- List of Medal of Honor recipients during Peacetime
