= 1916 =

1916 in various calendars
- Gregorian calendar: 1916; MCMXVI
- Ab urbe condita: 2669
- Armenian calendar: 1365; ԹՎ ՌՅԿԵ
- Assyrian calendar: 6666
- Baháʼí calendar: 72–73
- Balinese saka calendar: 1837–1838
- Bengali calendar: 1322–1323
- Berber calendar: 2866
- British Regnal year: 6 Geo. 5 – 7 Geo. 5
- Buddhist calendar: 2460
- Burmese calendar: 1278
- Byzantine calendar: 7424–7425
- Chinese calendar: 乙卯年 (Wood Rabbit); 4613 or 4406 — to — 丙辰年 (Fire Dragon); 4614 or 4407
- Coptic calendar: 1632–1633
- Discordian calendar: 3082
- Ethiopian calendar: 1908–1909
- Hebrew calendar: 5676–5677
- Hindu calendars
- Vikram Samvat: 1972–1973
- Shaka Samvat: 1837–1838
- Kali Yuga: 5016–5017
- Holocene calendar: 11916
- Igbo calendar: 916–917
- Iranian calendar: 1294–1295
- Islamic calendar: 1334–1335
- Japanese calendar: Taishō 5 (大正５年)
- Javanese calendar: 1846–1847
- Juche calendar: 5
- Julian calendar: Gregorian minus 13 days
- Korean calendar: 4249
- Minguo calendar: ROC 5 民國5年
- Nanakshahi calendar: 448
- Thai solar calendar: 2458–2459
- Tibetan calendar: ཤིང་མོ་ཡོས་ལོ་ (female Wood-Hare); 2042 or 1661 or 889 — to — མེ་ཕོ་འབྲུག་ལོ་ (male Fire-Dragon); 2043 or 1662 or 890

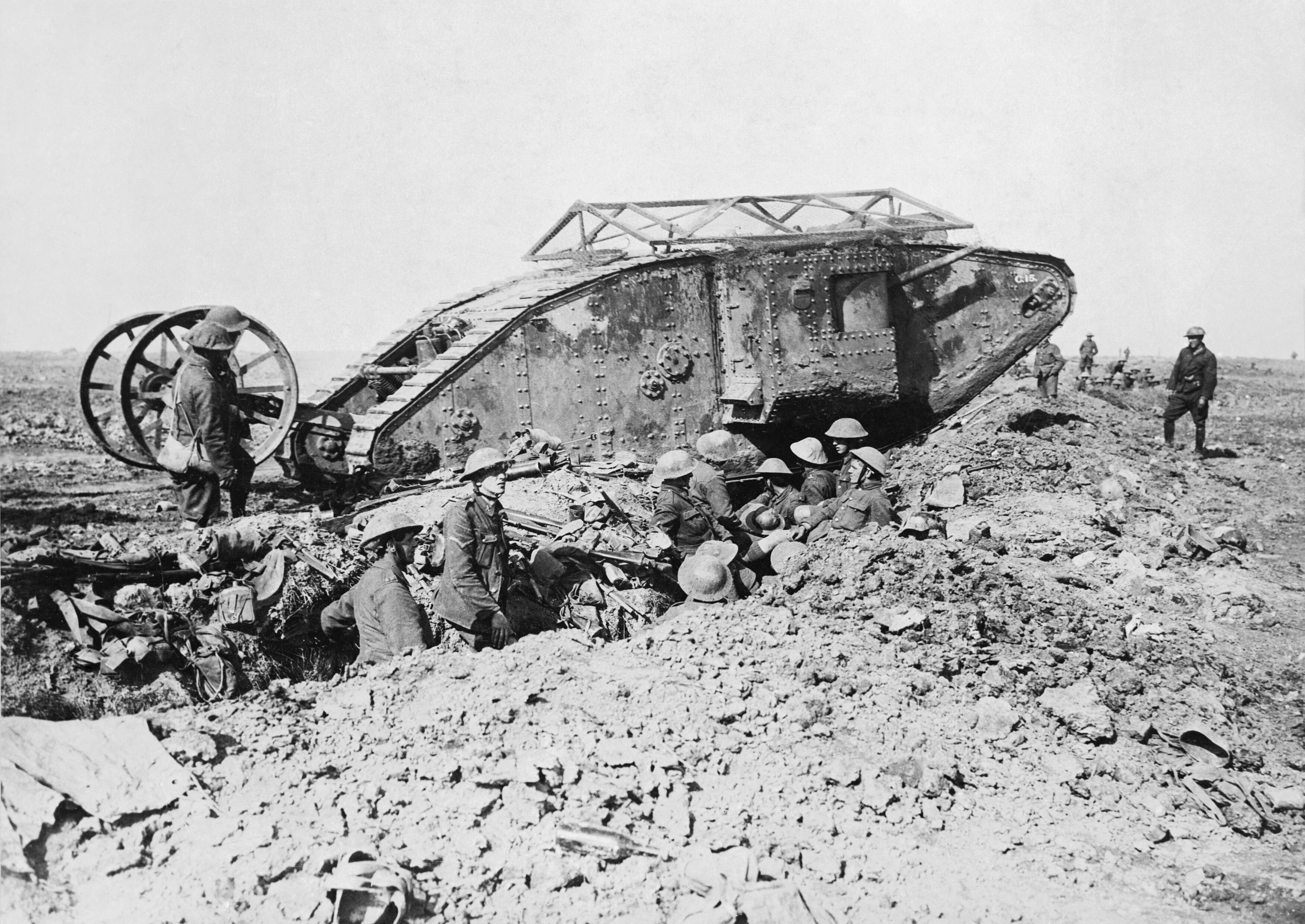
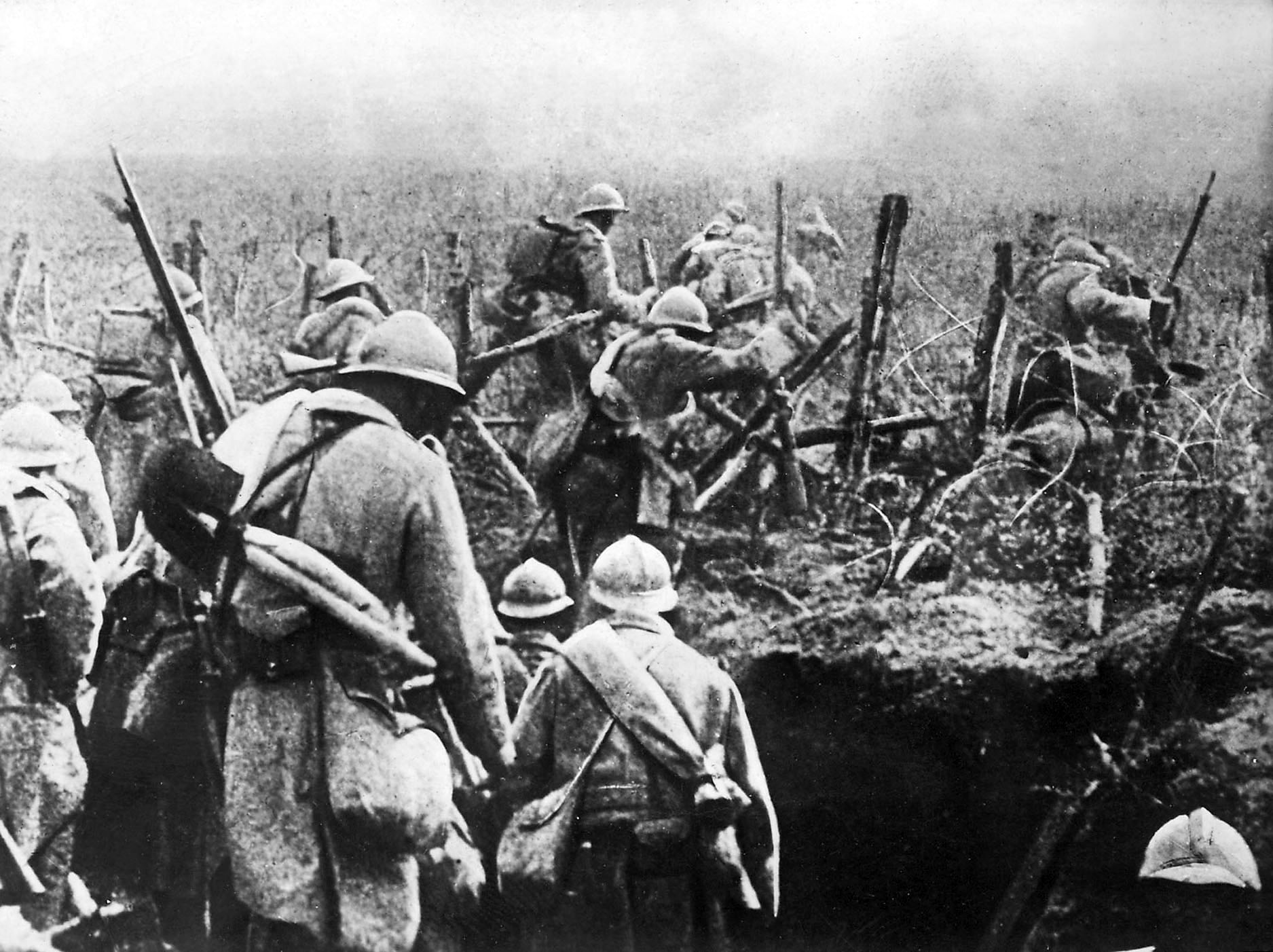
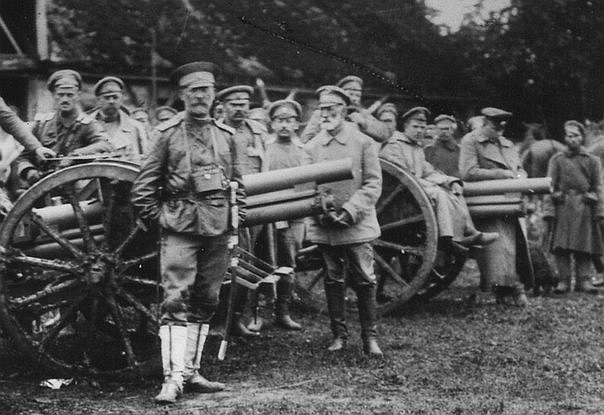
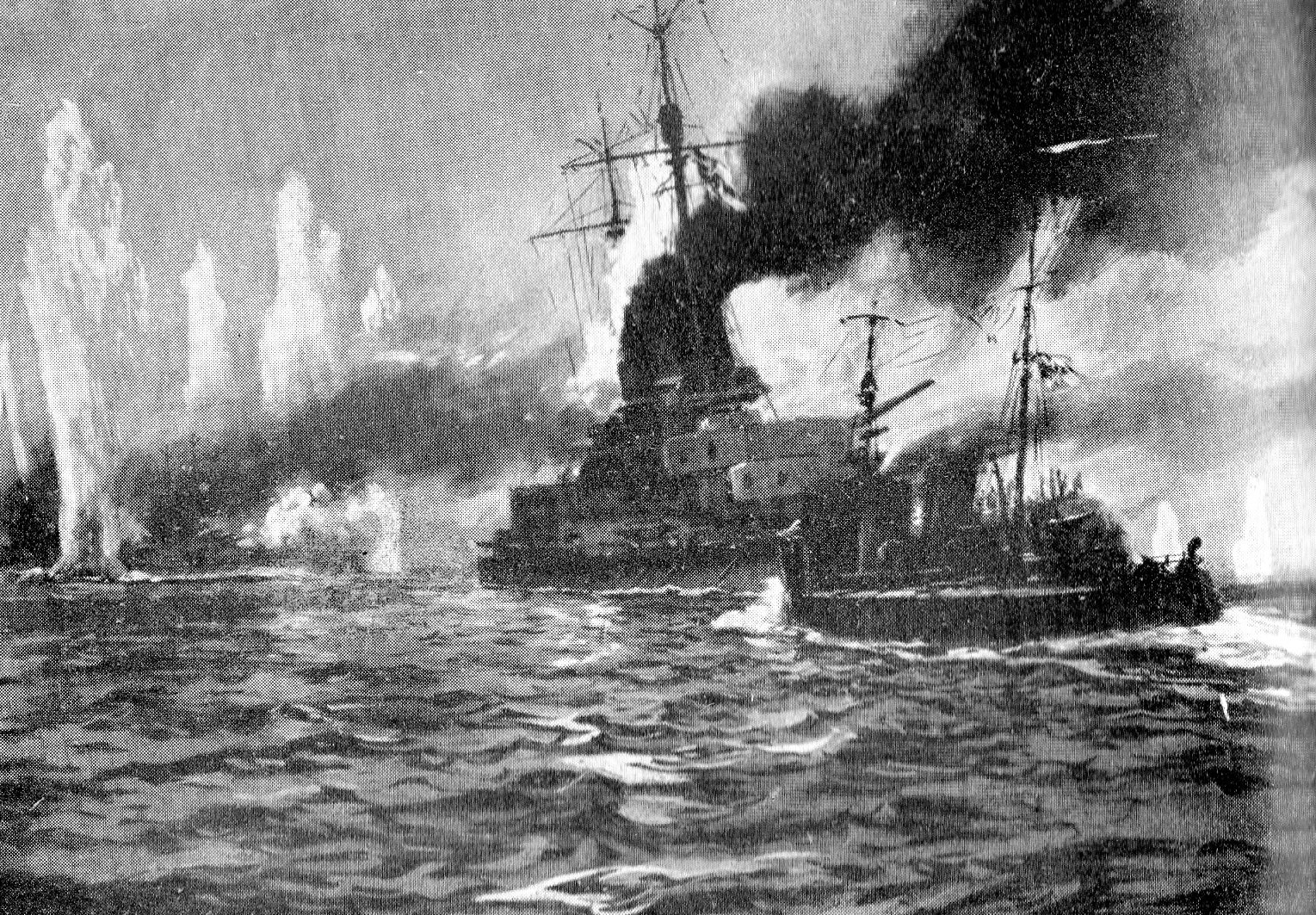
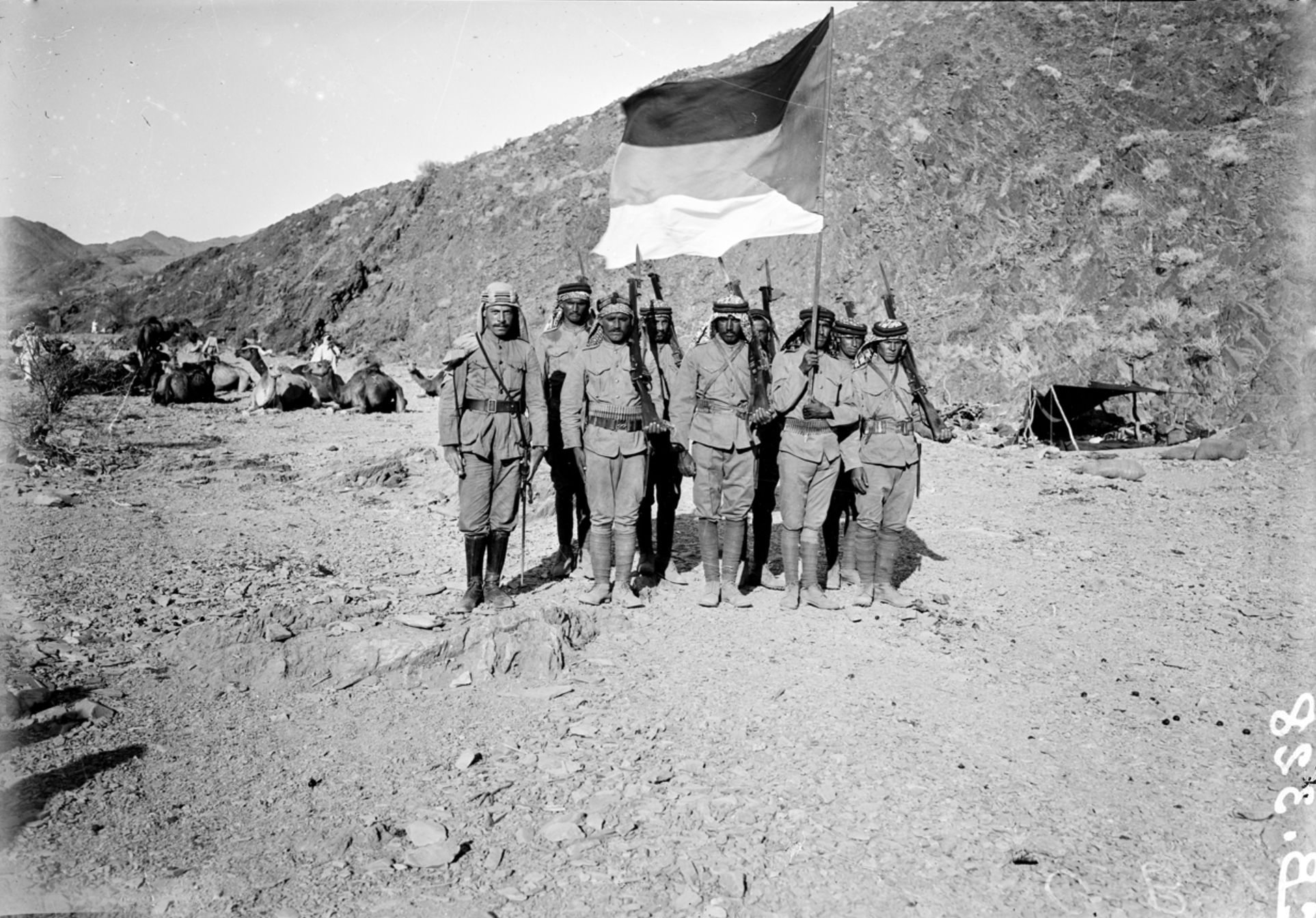
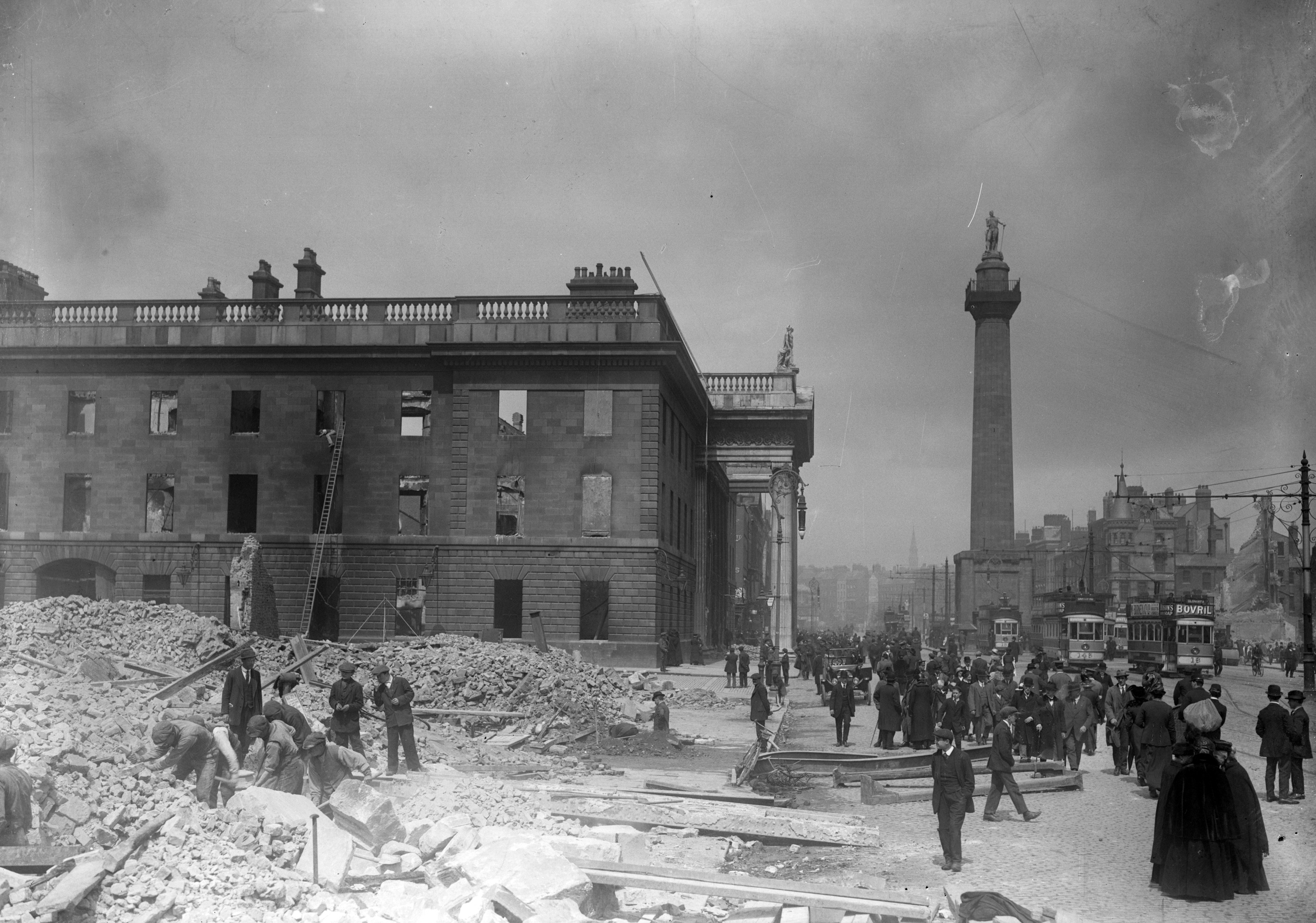
From top to bottom, left to right:
- The Battle of the Somme begins as British and French forces attack German lines in northern France, causing over one million casualties;
- The Battle of Verdun between France and Germany leaves nearly 700,000 dead or wounded, symbolizing the Western Front stalemate;
- The Brusilov Offensive gives Russia major gains against Austria-Hungary but with heavy losses;
- The Battle of Jutland in the North Sea, the war’s largest naval battle, ends without a clear victor but secures British naval dominance;
- The Arab Revolt is launched against Ottoman rule with British support and T. E. Lawrence;
- The Easter Rising in Dublin sees Irish republicans stage a doomed revolt against British rule.

1916 (MCMXVI) was a leap year starting on Saturday of the Gregorian calendar and a leap year starting on Friday of the Julian calendar, the 1916th year of the Common Era (CE) and Anno Domini (AD) designations, the 916th year of the 2nd millennium, the 16th year of the 20th century, and the 7th year of the 1910s decade. As of the start of 1916, the Gregorian calendar was 13 days ahead of the Julian calendar, which remained in localized use until 1923.

== Events ==
Below, the events of the First World War have the "WWI" prefix.

=== January ===
- January 1 – The British Royal Army Medical Corps carries out the first successful blood transfusion, using blood that has been stored and cooled.
- January 9 – WWI: Gallipoli Campaign – The last British troops are evacuated from Gallipoli, as the Ottoman Empire prevails over a joint British and French operation to capture Constantinople.
- January 10 – WWI: Erzurum Offensive – Russia defeats the Ottoman Empire.
- January 12 – The Gilbert and Ellice Islands Colony, part of the British Empire, is established in modern-day Tuvalu and Kiribati.
- January 13 – WWI: Battle of Wadi – Ottoman Empire forces defeat the British, during the Mesopotamian campaign in modern-day Iraq.
- January 29 – WWI: Paris is bombed by German zeppelins.

=== February ===
- February 9 (6.00 p.m.) – Tristan Tzara "founds" the art movement Dadaism (according to Hans Arp).
- February 11
  - The Baltimore Symphony Orchestra presents its first concert in the United States.
  - The Romanian Association football club Sportul Studențesc is founded in Bucharest.
- February 12 – WWI: Battle of Salaita Hill (East African Campaign) – South African and other British Empire troops fail to take a German East African defensive position.
- February 21 – WWI: The Battle of Verdun begins in France.

=== March ===
- March 8–9 – Mexican Revolution: Pancho Villa leads about 500 Mexican raiders in an attack against Columbus, New Mexico, killing 12 U.S. soldiers. A garrison of the U.S. 13th Cavalry Regiment fights back and drives them away.
- March 10 – The McMahon–Hussein Correspondence concludes with an understanding that the United Kingdom would recognise Arab independence in return for Hussein bin Ali, Sharif of Mecca, launching the Arab Revolt against the Ottoman Empire.
- March 15 – United States President Woodrow Wilson sends 12,000 United States troops over the U.S.–Mexico border to pursue Pancho Villa; the 13th Cavalry regiment enters Mexican territory.
- March 16 – Mexican Revolution: The U.S. 7th and 10th Cavalry regiments under John J. Pershing cross the border, to join the hunt for Villa.
- March 22 – The temporary Emperor of China, Yuan Shikai, abdicates the throne, and the Republic of China is restored once again.
- March 24 – French ferry SS Sussex is torpedoed by SM UB-29 in the English Channel, with at least 50 killed (including the composer Enrique Granados), resulting on May 4 in the Sussex Pledge by Germany to the United States.

=== April ===
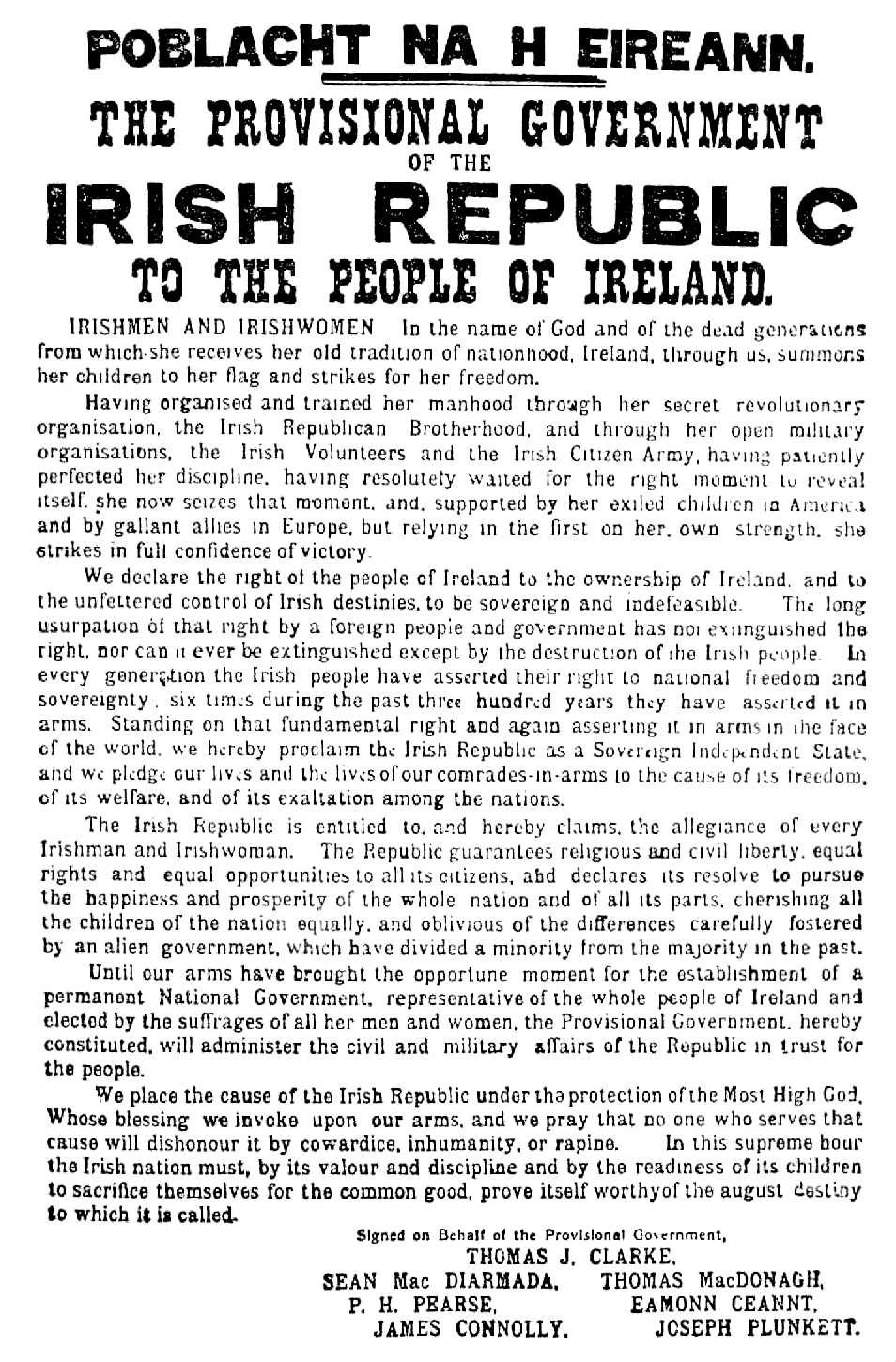
Proclamation of the Irish Republic distributed during the Easter Rising

- April
  - The toggle light switch is invented, by William J. Newton and Morris Goldberg.
  - Korea Tungsten is founded in Daegu, predecessor of leading steel producer in Asia, POSCO (Pohang Steel Company).
- April 11 – WWI: The Egyptian Expeditionary Force begins the occupation of the Sinai Peninsula.
- April 22 – The Chinese troop transport SS Hsin-Yu capsizes off the Chinese coast; at least 1,000 are killed.
- April 24–30 – The Easter Rising occurs in Ireland. Members of the Irish Republican Brotherhood proclaim an Irish Republic, and the Irish Volunteers and Irish Citizen Army occupy the General Post Office and other buildings in Dublin, before surrendering to the British Army. A total of 485 Irish Volunteers, British soldiers and Irish civilians were killed as well as 2,200 wounded and 16 rebel leaders would be executed.
- April 24–May 10 – Voyage of the James Caird: An open boat journey from Elephant Island in the South Shetland Islands to South Georgia in the southern Atlantic Ocean (800 nautical miles (1,500 km; 920 mi)) is undertaken by Sir Ernest Shackleton and five companions, to obtain rescue for the main body of the Imperial Trans-Antarctic Expedition, following the loss of its ship Endurance.
- April 27 – WWI: Gas attack at Hulluch in France: The 47th Brigade, 16th (Irish) Division is decimated, in one of the most heavily concentrated German gas attacks of the war.
- April 29 – WWI: Mesopotamian campaign – The Siege of Kut ends with the surrender of British Indian Army forces to the Ottoman Empire at Kut-al-Amara on the Tigris in Basra Vilayet.

=== May ===
May 31–June 1:Battle of Jutland between Allies and Germany

- May 3–12 - 15 Irish rebel leaders who took part in the Easter Rising in Dublin in April are executed. Among them were Patrick Pearse, James Connolly, Thomas Clarke and William Pearse, brother of Patrick Pearse who had served as a captain rather than a leader.
- May 16
  - United States Marines invade the Dominican Republic.
  - Britain and France conclude the secret Sykes–Picot Agreement, which is to divide Arab areas of the Ottoman Empire, following the conclusion of WWI and the partitioning of the Ottoman Empire, into French and British spheres of influence.
- May 31–June 1 – WWI: Battle of Jutland, between the British Royal Navy's Grand Fleet and the Imperial German Navy's High Seas Fleet in the North Sea, the war's only large-scale clash of battleships. The result is tactically inconclusive, but British dominance of the North Sea is maintained

=== June ===
- June 4 – WWI: The Brusilov Offensive, the height of Russian operations in the war, begins with their breaking through Austro-Hungarian lines.
- June 5 – WWI: HMS Hampshire sinks, having hit a mine off the Orkney Islands, Scotland, with Lord Kitchener aboard.
- June 10 – The Arab Revolt against the Ottoman Empire, to create a single unified Arab state spanning from Aleppo to Aden, is formally declared by Hussein bin Ali, Sharif of Mecca.

=== July ===
July 1–November 18:Battle of the Somme between British and German.

- July 1–November 18 – WWI: Battle of the Somme, opening with explosion of the British Y Sap and Lochnagar mines and the Battle of Albert: More than one million soldiers die, with 57,470 British Empire casualties on the first day, 19,240 of them killed, the British Army's bloodiest day. The immediate result is tactically inconclusive.
- July 1–12 – Jersey Shore shark attacks of 1916: At least one shark attacks 5 swimmers along 80 miles (130 km) of New Jersey coastline, resulting in 4 deaths and the survival of one youth, who requires limb amputation. This event is the inspiration for author Peter Benchley, over half a century later, to write Jaws.
- July 2 – WWI: Battle of Erzincan – Russian forces defeat troops of the Ottoman Empire in Armenia.
- July 6 – WWI: The Battle of Kostiuchnówka concludes in Galicia (modern-day Ukraine) with Russian Imperial troops breaking through the line, forcing the Polish Legions and supporting Hungarian troops to retreat, with the Poles enduring 2,000 casualties.
- July 15 – In Seattle, William Boeing incorporates Pacific Aero Products (later renamed Boeing).
- July 15–19 – WWI: Battle of Delville Wood – 766 men from the South African Brigade are killed, in South Africa's biggest loss during the First World War.
- July 16 – Max Reger's Hebbel Requiem is first performed in a memorial concert for the composer, conducted by Philipp Wolfrum.
- July 19–20 – WWI: Battle of Fromelles – An attack by Australian and British troops is repulsed by the German army, with heavy casualties.
- July 22 – Preparedness Day Bombing: In San Francisco, a bomb explodes on Market Street during a Preparedness Day parade, killing 10 and injuring 40; Warren Billings and Tom Mooney are later wrongly convicted of it.
- July 26 – WWI: East African Campaign – The German armed ship SMS Graf von Goetzen scuttles herself on Lake Tanganyika.
- July 29 – Matheson Fire: In Ontario, Canada, a lightning strike ignites a forest fire that destroys the towns of Cochrane and Matheson, killing 233.
- July 30 – German agents cause the Black Tom explosion in Jersey City, New Jersey, an act of sabotage destroying an ammunition depot and killing at least 7 people.

=== August ===
- August – Robert Baden-Powell publishes The Wolf Cub's Handbook in the U.K., establishing the basis of the junior section of the Scouting movement, the Wolf Cubs (modern-day Cub Scouts).
- August 3–5 – WWI: Sinai and Palestine Campaign – Battle of Romani: British Imperial troops secure victory over a joint Ottoman-German force.
- August 3 - Roger Casement is executed by hanging in Pentonville Gaol, London for his role in the Easter Rising in Dublin.
- August 4–16 – WWI: Italian forces launch a successful offensive against Austro-Hungarian forces in Gorizia and Sabotin.
- August 7 – WWI:
  - Portugal joins the Allies.
  - French and British forces make an unopposed entry into German-controlled Togoland; on December 27 the country is partitioned between the two allies.
- August 9 – Lassen Volcanic National Park is established in California.
- August 15 – Club Atlas is founded as an association football club in Guadalajara, Mexico, by English-educated players.
- August 16 – The Migratory Bird Treaty between Canada and the United States is signed.
- August 17 (August 4 O.S.) – WWI: The Treaty of Bucharest is signed secretly between Romania and the Entente Powers, stipulating the conditions under which Romania agrees to join the war on their side, particularly territorial promises in Austria-Hungary.
- August 21 – WWI: Peru declares neutrality.
- August 25 – U.S. President Woodrow Wilson signs legislation creating the National Park Service.
- August 27 – WWI: The Kingdom of Romania declares war on the Central Powers, entering the war on the side of the Allies.
- August 28 – WWI:
  - Germany declares war on Romania.
  - Italy declares war on Germany.
- August 29 – The United States passes the Philippine Autonomy Act.
- August 30 – The crew of the Imperial Trans-Antarctic Expedition's Endurance is rescued from Elephant Island.

=== September ===
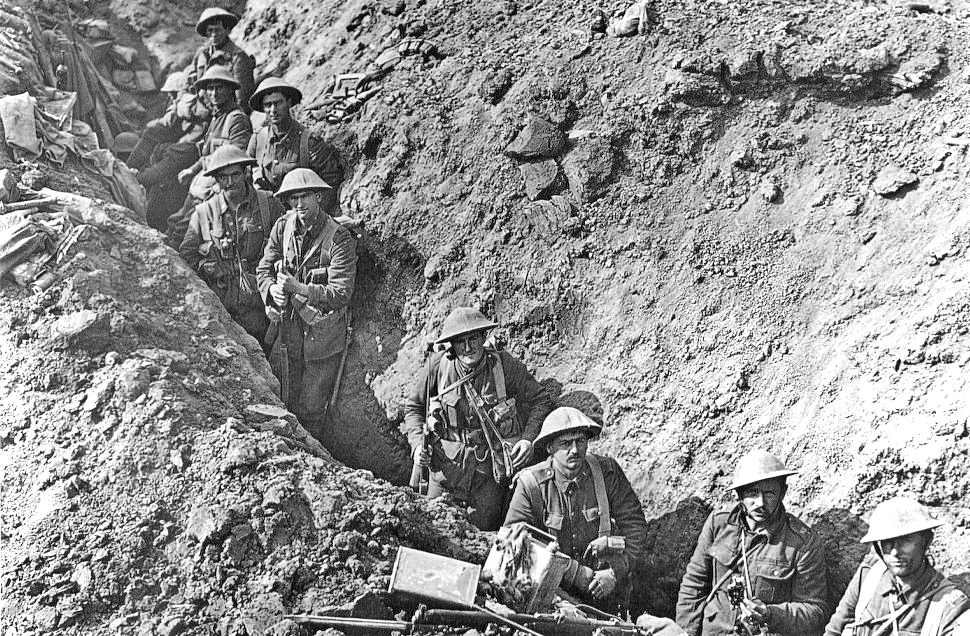
Troops from New Zealand during WWI.

- September 1 – Bulgaria declares war on Romania, going on to take Dobruja.
- September 2 – WWI: British pilot Leefe Robinson becomes the first to shoot down a German airship over Britain.
- September 4 – WWI: East African Campaign – Dar es Salaam surrenders to British Empire forces, securing them control of the Central Line of railway through German East Africa.
- September 5 – D. W. Griffith's film Intolerance: Love's Struggle Through the Ages is released in the United States.
- September 6 – The first true self-service grocery store, Piggly Wiggly, is founded in Memphis, Tennessee, by Clarence Saunders, opening 5 days later.
- September 11 – A mechanical failure causes the central span of the Quebec Bridge, a cantilever-type structure, to crash into the Saint Lawrence River for the second time, killing 13 workers.
- September 13 – Mary, a circus elephant, is hanged in the town of Erwin, Tennessee for killing her handler, Walter "Red" Eldridge.
- September 15–22 – WWI: Battle of Flers–Courcelette, France – The battle is significant for the first use of the tank in warfare; also for the debut of the Canadian and New Zealand Divisions in the Battle of the Somme.
- September 19 – WWI: East African Campaign – Belgian troops occupy Tabora in German East Africa.
- September 27 – Iyasu V of Ethiopia is deposed in a palace coup, in favour of his aunt Zewditu.
- September 29 – John D. Rockefeller becomes the first person to reach a nominal personal fortune of US$1 billion

=== October ===
- October 7 – The Georgia Tech vs. Cumberland College American football game ends in a score of 222–0.
- October 12 – Hipólito Yrigoyen is elected President of Argentina.
- October 14 – Perm State University is founded in Russia.
- October 16 – Margaret Sanger opens the first U.S. birth control clinic, a forerunner of Planned Parenthood.
- October 20 – Black Friday (1916): A violent and deadly storm hits Lake Erie in the United States.
- October 21 – Friedrich Adler shoots Count Karl von Stürgkh, Minister-President of Austria.
- October 27 – Battle of Segale: Negus Mikael of Wollo, marching on the Ethiopian capital in support of his son Emperor Iyasu V, is defeated by Fitawrari Habte Giyorgis, securing the throne for Empress Zewditu.

=== November ===
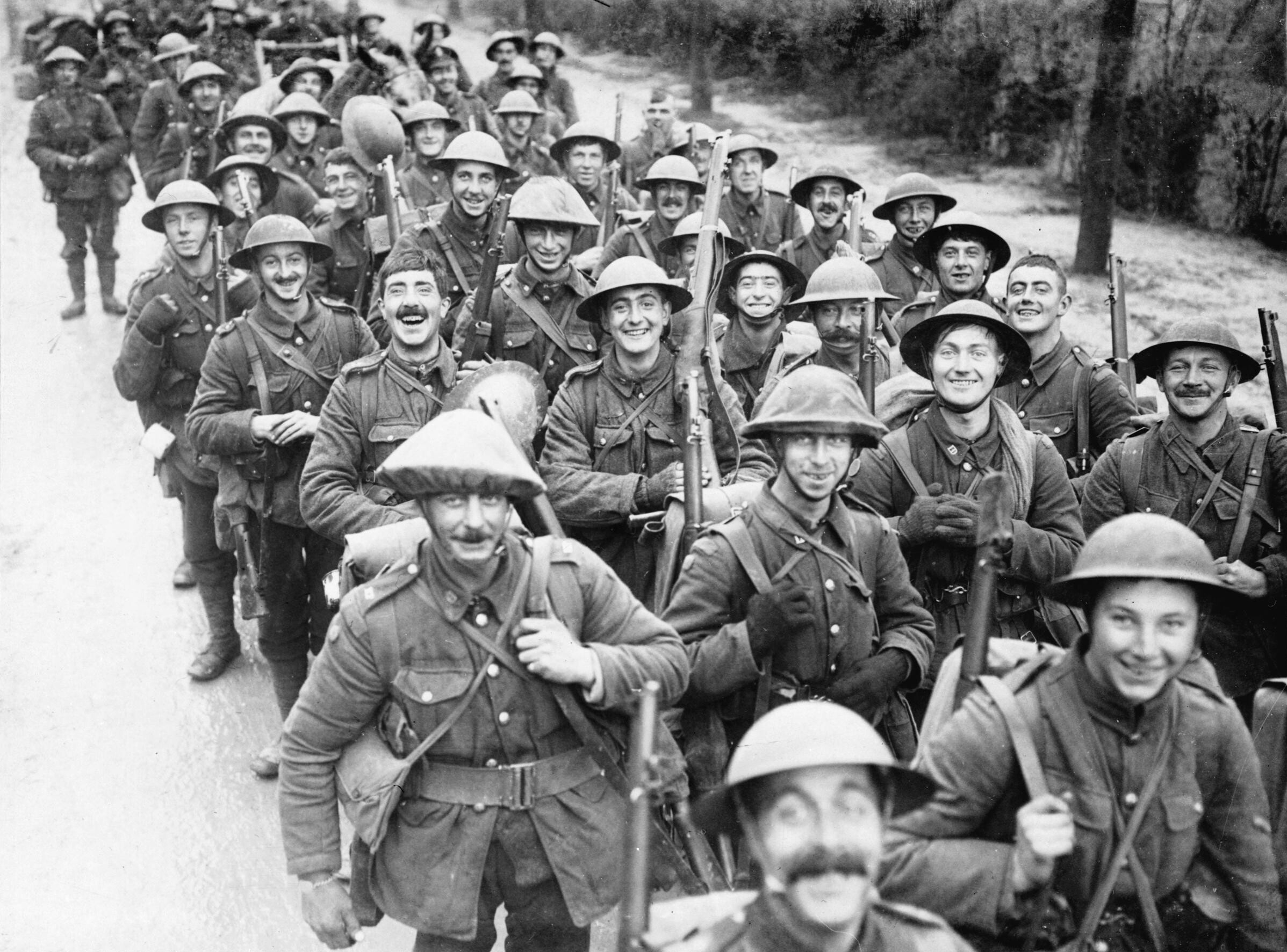
Royal Fusiliers (City of London Regiment) marching to the trenches, November 1916

- November 1
  - Pavel Milyukov delivers his "stupidity or treason" speech in the Russian State Duma, precipitating the downfall of the Boris Stürmer government.
  - The first 40-hour work week officially begins, in the Endicott-Johnson factories of Western New York.
- November 5
  - The Kingdom of Poland (1916–18) is proclaimed by a joint act of the emperors of Germany and Austria.
  - Everett massacre: An armed confrontation in Everett, Washington, between local authorities and members of the Industrial Workers of the World results in seven deaths.
- November 7 – 1916 United States presidential election: Democratic President Woodrow Wilson narrowly defeats Republican Charles Evans Hughes, when California is called a week after Election Day.
- November 13 – Prime Minister of Australia Billy Hughes is expelled from the Labor Party over his support for conscription.
- November 18 – WWI – Battle of the Somme: In France, British Expeditionary Force commander Douglas Haig calls off the battle, which started on July 1.
- November 21
  - Emperor Franz Joseph I of Austria dies of pneumonia at the Schönbrunn Palace, Vienna, aged 86, after a reign of 68 years and is succeeded by his grandnephew Charles I.
  - WWI: Hospital ship HMHS Britannic, designed as the third Olympic-class ocean liner for White Star Line, sinks in the Kea Channel of the Aegean Sea after hitting a mine; 30 lives are lost. At 48,158 gross register tons, she is the largest ship lost during the war.
- November 23 – WWI: Eastern Front – Bucharest, the capital of Romania, is occupied by troops of the Central Powers.

=== December ===
- December 1 – An armed confrontation in Athens between the Kingdom of Greece and the Allied Powers, arising from a dispute over Greece's neutrality in World War I, followed by reprisals and riots against Greek supporters of the Allies marking the height of the National Schism.
- December 12 – "White Friday": In the Dolomites, 100 avalanches bury at least 2,000 Austrian and Italian soldiers.
- December 16 – Robert Baden-Powell gives the first public display of the new Wolf Cub section of Scouting at Caxton Hall, Westminster.
- December 18 – WWI: The Battle of Verdun ends in France with German troops defeated.
- December 21 – WWI: El Arish occupied by the British Empire Desert Column during advance across the Sinai Peninsula.
- December 22 – The British Sopwith Camel aircraft makes its maiden flight. It is designed to counter the German Fokker aircraft.
- December 23 – WWI: The Desert Column captures the Ottoman garrison during the Battle of Magdhaba.
- December 30
  - Karl von Habsburg and his wife Zita of Bourbon-Parma are crowned emperor and empress of Austria-Hungary.
  - Humberto Gómez and his mercenaries seize Arauca in Colombia and declare the Republic of Arauca. He proceeds to pillage the region before fleeing to Venezuela.
  - (December 17 Old Style) – The mystic Grigori Rasputin is murdered in Saint Petersburg.

=== Date unknown ===
- The 1916 Summer Olympics are cancelled in Berlin.
- Ferdinand de Saussure's Cours de linguistique générale is collected posthumously and published.
- Oxycodone, a narcotic painkiller closely related to codeine, is first synthesized in Germany.
- Ernst Rüdin publishes his initial results on the genetics of schizophrenia.
- Rodeo's first side-delivery bucking chute is designed and made by the Bascom brothers (Raymond, Mel, and Earl) and their father, John W. Bascom, at Welling, Alberta, Canada.
- Gustav Holst composes The Planets, Opus 32.
- The Society of Motion Picture and Television Engineers is founded in the United States as the Society of Motion Picture Engineers.
- Ishikawajima Automobile Manufacturing, predecessor of Isuzu, a truck brand in Japan, is founded.

== In fiction ==
- In the 1941 film Citizen Kane, Charles Foster Kane runs for New York governor and loses. Also in 1916, Emily Monroe Norton divorces him and, in either this year or in 1917, he marries Susan Alexander.

== Births ==
=== January ===
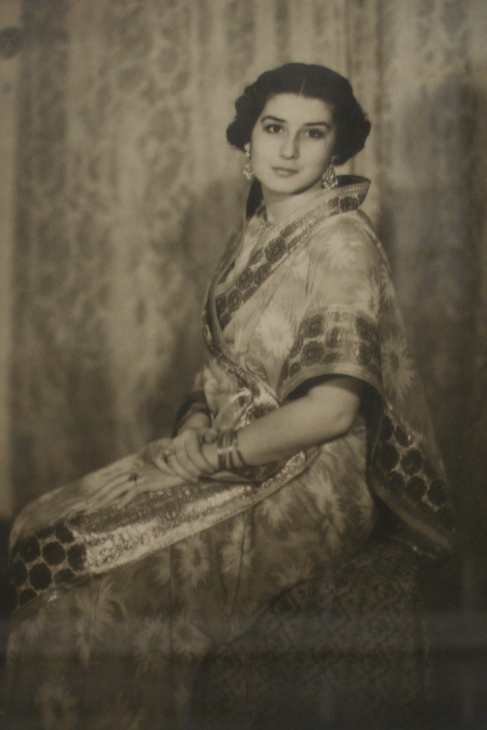
Nilufer Hanımsultan

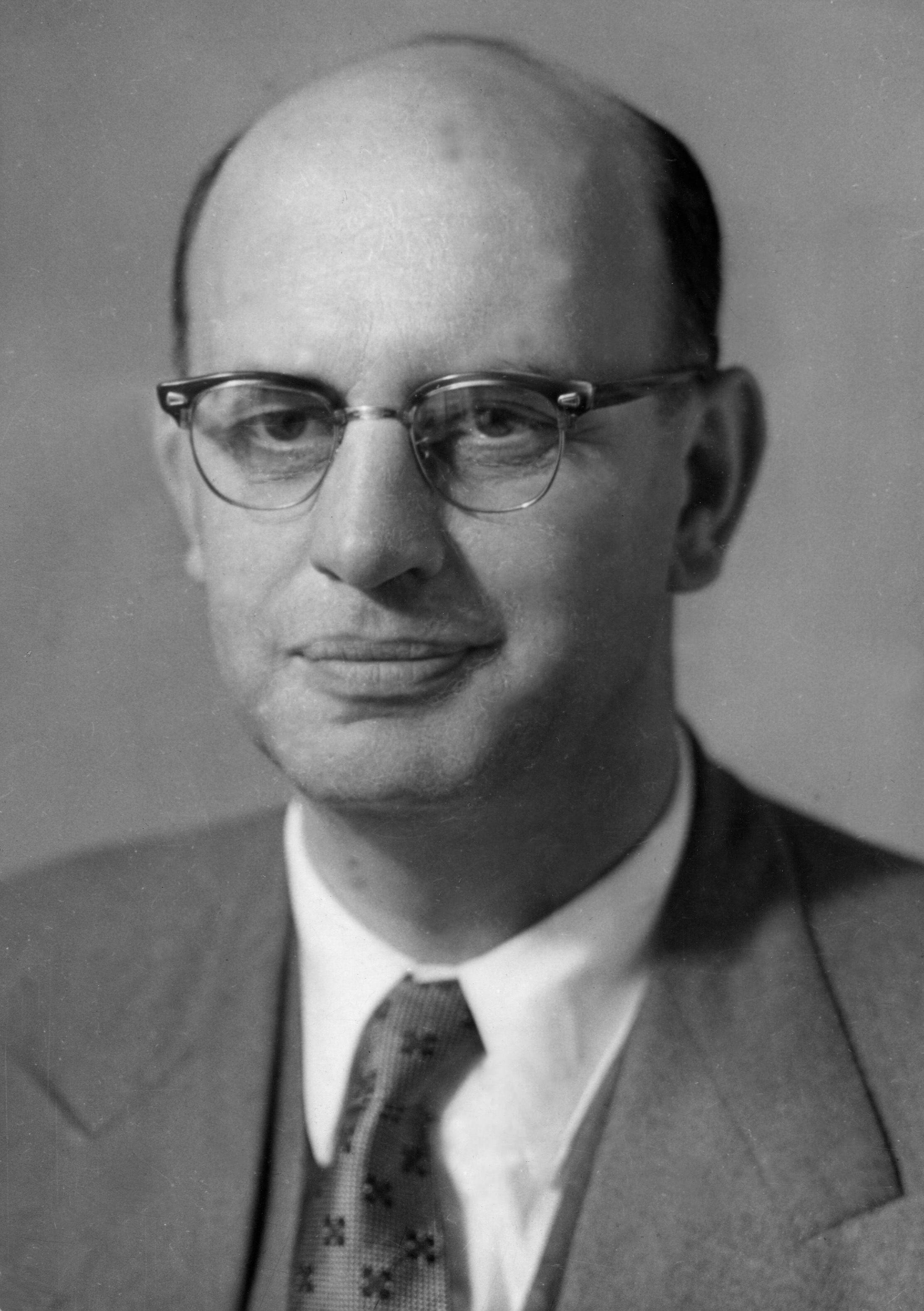
P. W. Botha

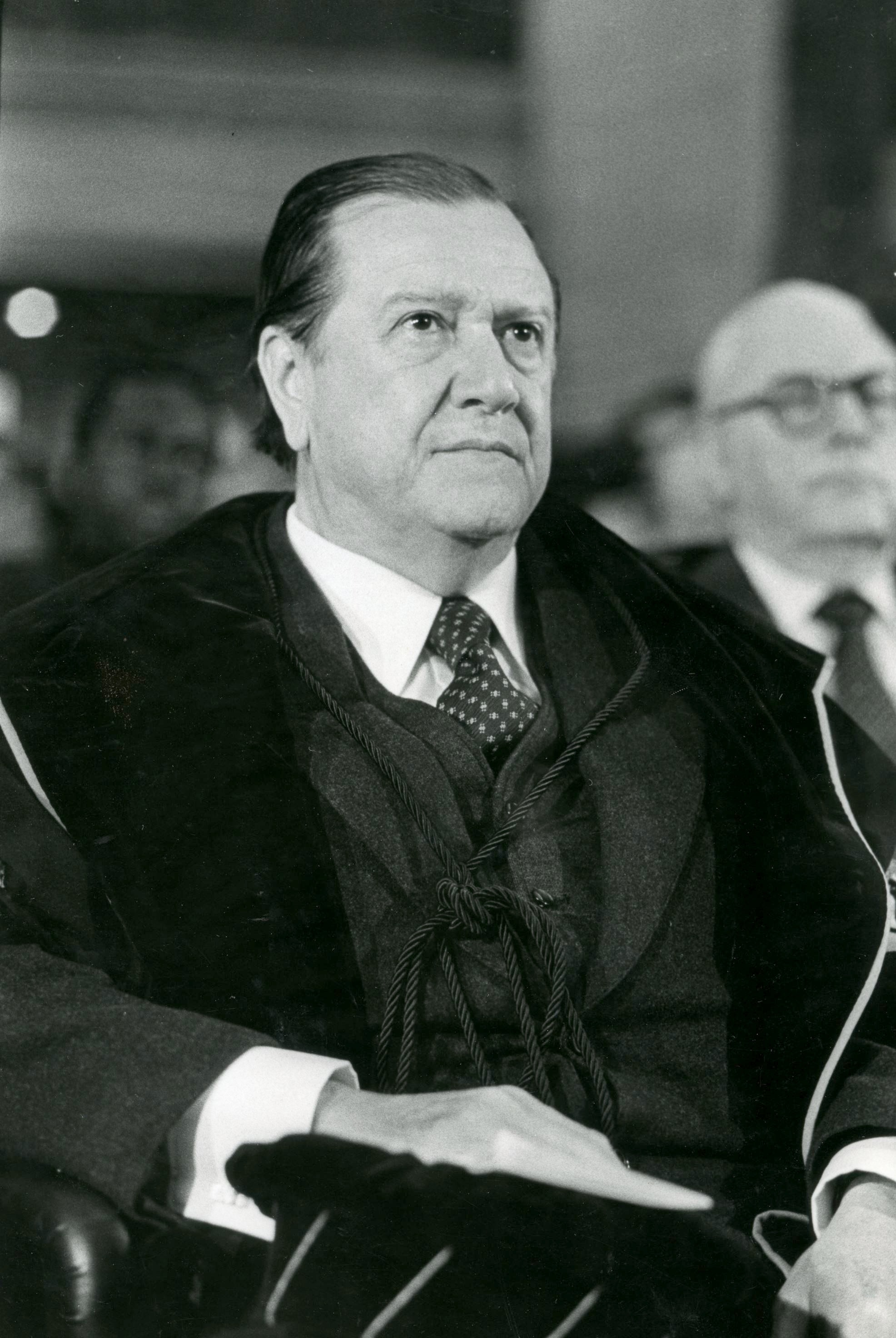
Rafael Caldera

- January 3 – Maxene Andrews, American singer (The Andrews Sisters) (d. 1995)
- January 4 – Nilufer Hanımsultan, Ottoman princess (d. 1989)
- January 7
  - Elena Ceaușescu, Romanian politician, First Lady of Romania and Deputy Prime Minister of Romania (d. 1989)
  - Paul Keres, Estonian chess player (d. 1975)
- January 9 – Peter Twinn, English mathematician and WWII code-breaker (d. 2004)
- January 10 – Sune Bergström, Swedish biochemist, recipient of the Nobel Prize in Physiology or Medicine (d. 2004)
- January 12
  - Ruth R. Benerito, American chemist (d. 2013)
  - P. W. Botha, 9th President of South Africa (d. 2006)
- January 15 – Hugh Gibb, English drummer and bandleader (d. 1992)
- January 18 – Silviu Brucan, Romanian author and politician (d. 2006)
- January 22 – Henri Dutilleux, French composer (d. 2013)
- January 24
  - Rafael Caldera, 39th President of Venezuela (d. 2009)
  - Arnoldo Foà, Italian actor (d. 2014)
  - Daphne Lorraine Gum, Australian educator (d. 2017)
- January 27 – Stjepan Filipović, Yugoslav national hero (d. 1942)
- January 31 – Sangoulé Lamizana, 2nd President and Prime Minister of Burkina Faso (d. 2005)

=== February ===
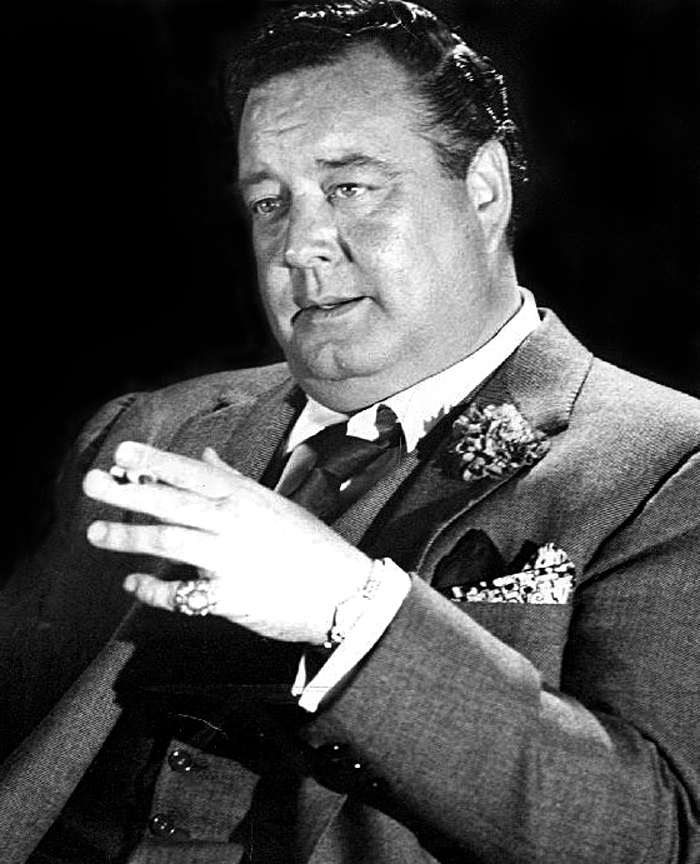
Jackie Gleason

- February 13 – John Reed, British actor and opera singer (d. 2010)
- February 14
  - Marcel Bigeard, French military officer (d. 2010)
  - Sally Gray, English actress (d. 2006)
  - Masaki Kobayashi, Japanese film director (d. 1996)
- February 15 – D. B. Wijetunga, 4th President and 9th Prime Minister of Sri Lanka (d. 2008)
- February 16
  - Karel Dufek, Czechoslovak diplomat (d. 2009)
  - Dương Văn Minh, 4th President of South Vietnam and ARVN general (d. 2001)
- February 18 – Maria Altmann, Austrian-born American Holocaust survivor and heiress (d. 2011)
- February 20 – Jean Erdman, American dancer and choreographer (d. 2020)
- February 26 – Jackie Gleason, American comedian, actor and musician (d. 1987)
- February 28
  - Cesar Climaco, Filipino politician, Mayor of Zamboanga (d. 1984)
  - Frank Crean, Australian politician (d. 2008)

=== March ===
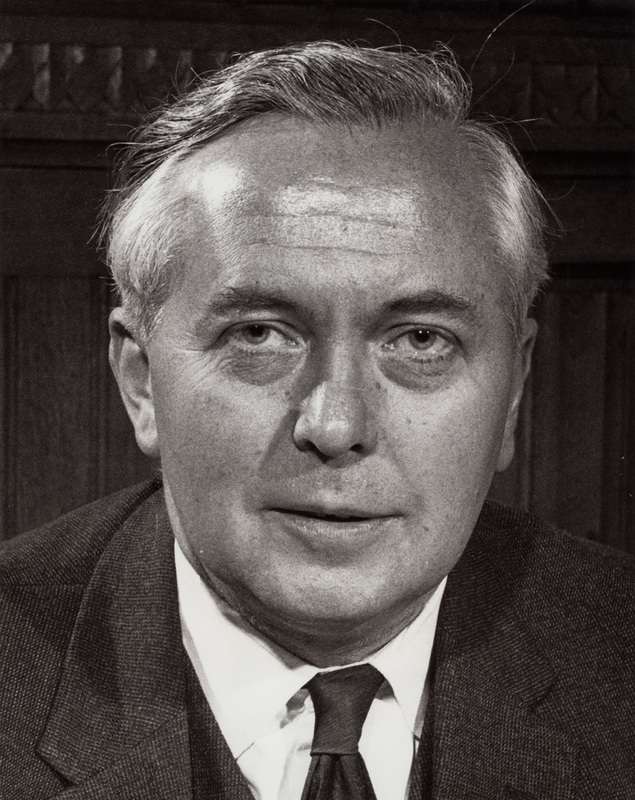
Harold Wilson

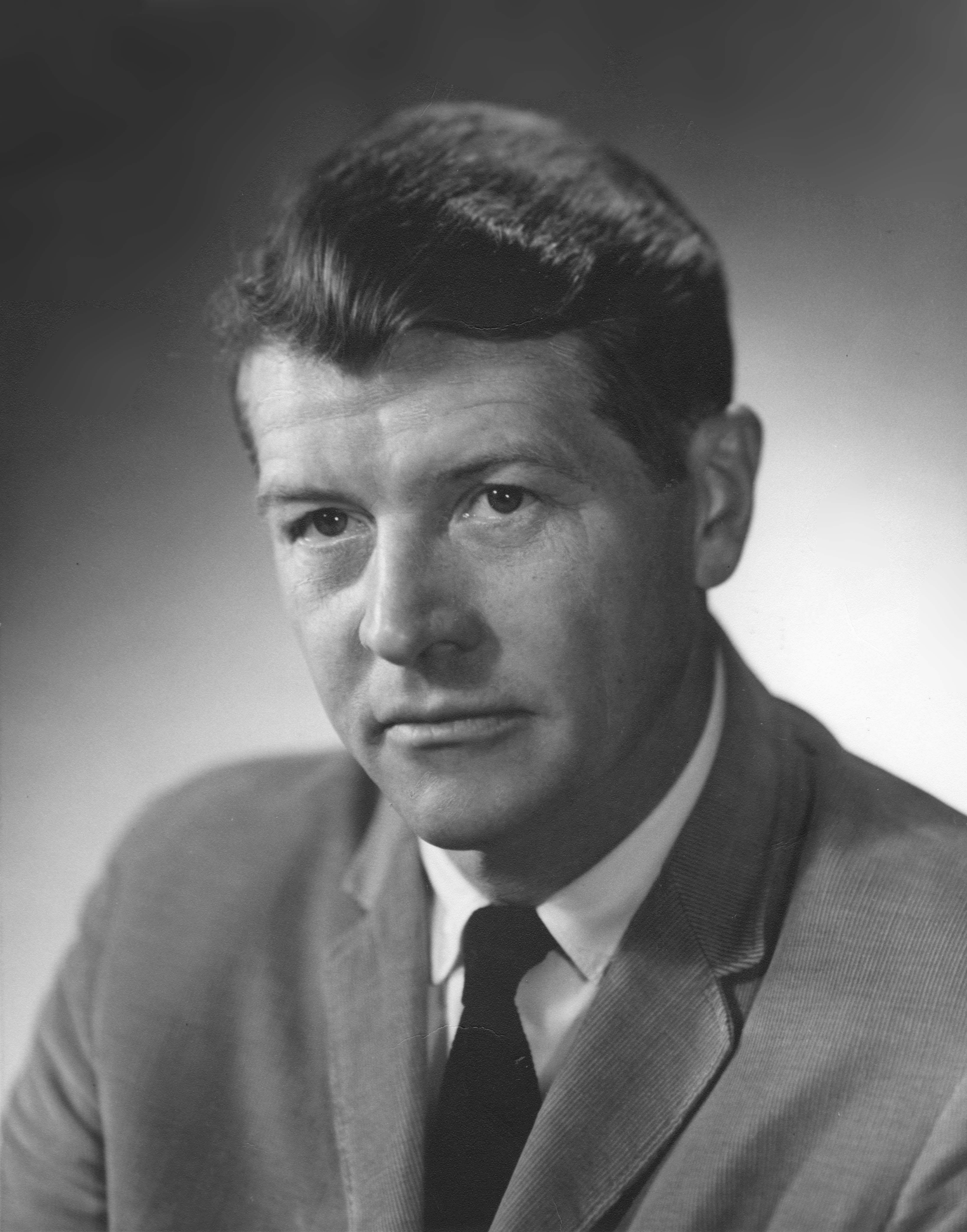
Christian B. Anfinsen

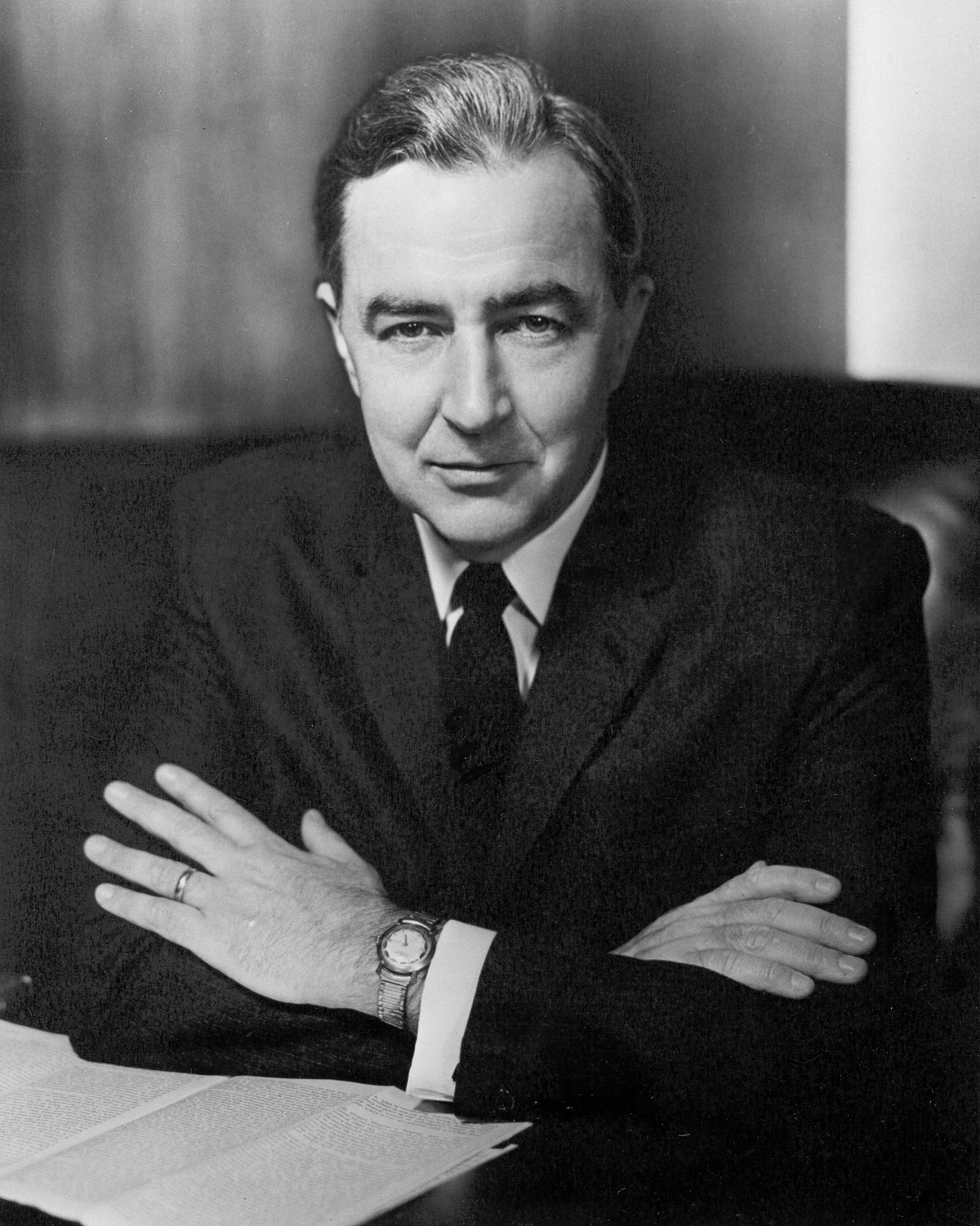
Eugene McCarthy

- March 3 – Paul Halmos, Hungarian-born American mathematician (d. 2006)
- March 4
  - Giorgio Bassani, Italian writer (d. 2000)
  - Hans Eysenck, German-born British psychologist (d. 1997)
- March 11 – Harold Wilson, Prime Minister of the United Kingdom (d. 1995)
- March 13
  - Lindy Boggs, American politician (d. 2013)
  - Jacque Fresco, American futurist and designer (d. 2017)
- March 14 – Horton Foote, American writer (d. 2009)
- March 15
  - Junior Coghlan, American actor (d. 2009)
  - Harry James, American musician and band leader (d. 1983)
- March 16
  - Mercedes McCambridge, American actress (d. 2004)
  - Tsutomu Yamaguchi, Japanese survivor of Hiroshima and Nagasaki atomic bombings (d. 2010)
- March 17
  - Lyle Smith, American football coach (d. 2017)
  - Volodia Teitelboim, Chilean author and politician (d. 2008)
- March 19 – Irving Wallace, American novelist (d. 1990)
- March 20 – Pierre Messmer, prime minister of France (d. 2007)
- March 26 – Christian B. Anfinsen, American chemist, Nobel Prize laureate (d. 1995)
- March 29
  - Peter Geach, British philosopher (d. 2013)
  - Abu Sadat Mohammad Sayem, 6th President of Bangladesh (d. 1997)
  - Eugene McCarthy, U.S. Senator from Minnesota and Presidential candidate (d. 2005)
- March 31 – Lucille Bliss, American voice actor (d. 2012)

=== April ===
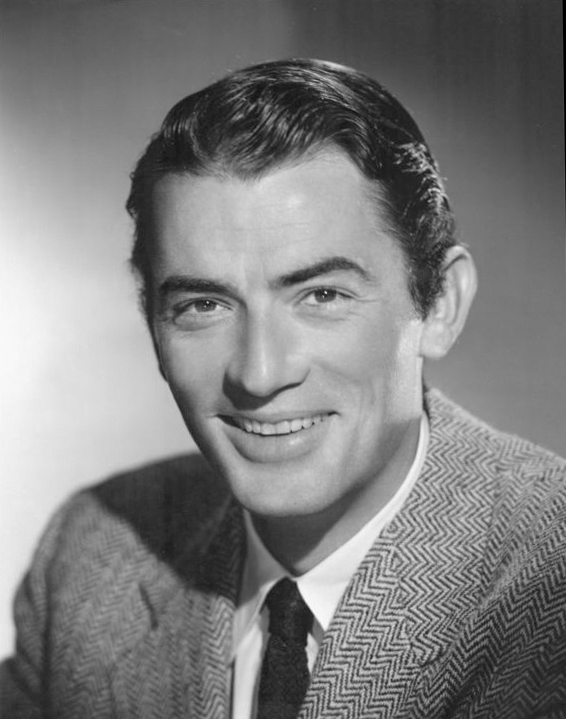
Gregory Peck

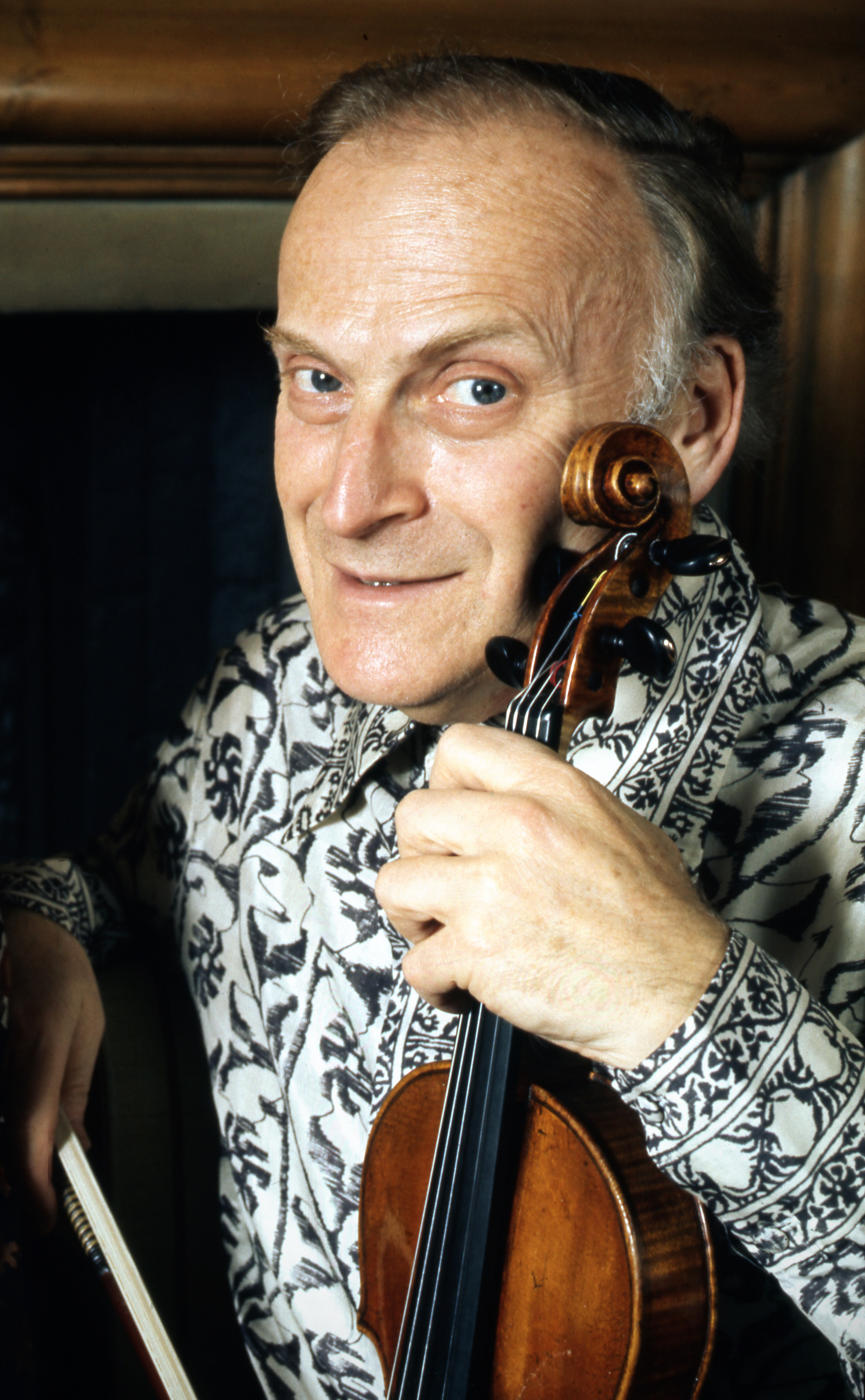
Yehudi Menuhin

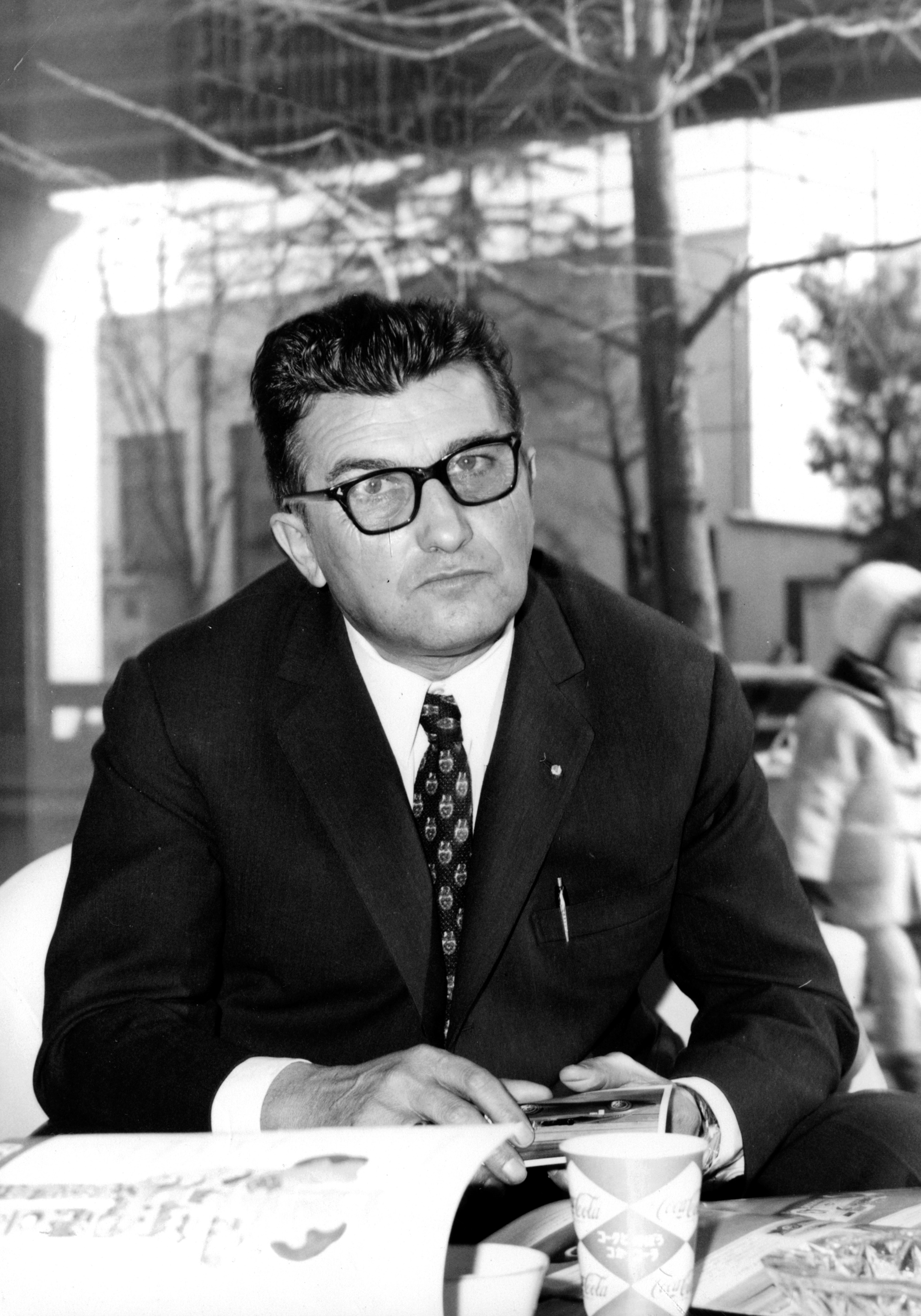
Ferruccio Lamborghini

- April 3 – Herb Caen, American journalist (d. 1997)
- April 4 – Nikola Ljubičić, 10th President of Serbia (d. 2005)
- April 5
  - Gregory Peck, American actor (d. 2003)
  - Jean Trescases, French soldier (d. 1951)
- April 10
  - Wendy Barnes, British overseas radio broadcaster (d. 2006)
  - Lee Jung-seob, Korean oil painter (d. 1956)
- April 11 – Alberto Ginastera, Argentine composer (d. 1983)
- April 12
  - Beverly Cleary, American children's book author (d. 2021)
  - Benjamin Libet, American neuroscientist (d. 2007)
- April 16 – Hon Sui Sen, Singaporean politician (d. 1983)
- April 17
  - Sirimavo Bandaranaike, prime minister of Sri Lanka (d. 2000)
  - Win Maung, 3rd President of Myanmar (d. 1989)
- April 18 – José Joaquín Trejos Fernández, President of Costa Rica (d. 2010)
- April 22 – Yehudi Menuhin, American-born British violinist (d. 1999)
- April 24 – Lou Thesz, American professional wrestler (d. 2002)
- April 25 – R. J. Rushdoony, American founder of Christian Reconstructionism (d. 2001)
- April 26
  - Vic Perrin, American voice actor (d. 1989)
  - Ken Wallis, British aviator, engineer, and inventor (d. 2013)
  - George Tuska, American comic strip artist (d. 2009)
- April 28 – Ferruccio Lamborghini, Italian automobile manufacturer (d. 1993)
- April 30
  - Claude Elwood Shannon, American information theorist (d. 2001)
  - Robert Shaw, American conductor (d. 1999)

=== May ===
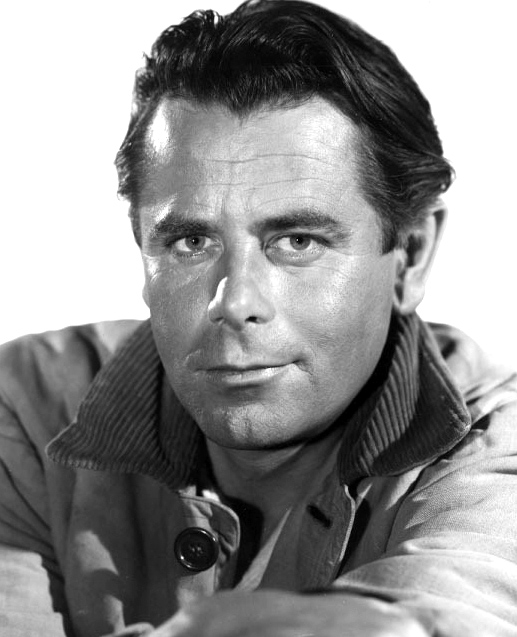
Glenn Ford

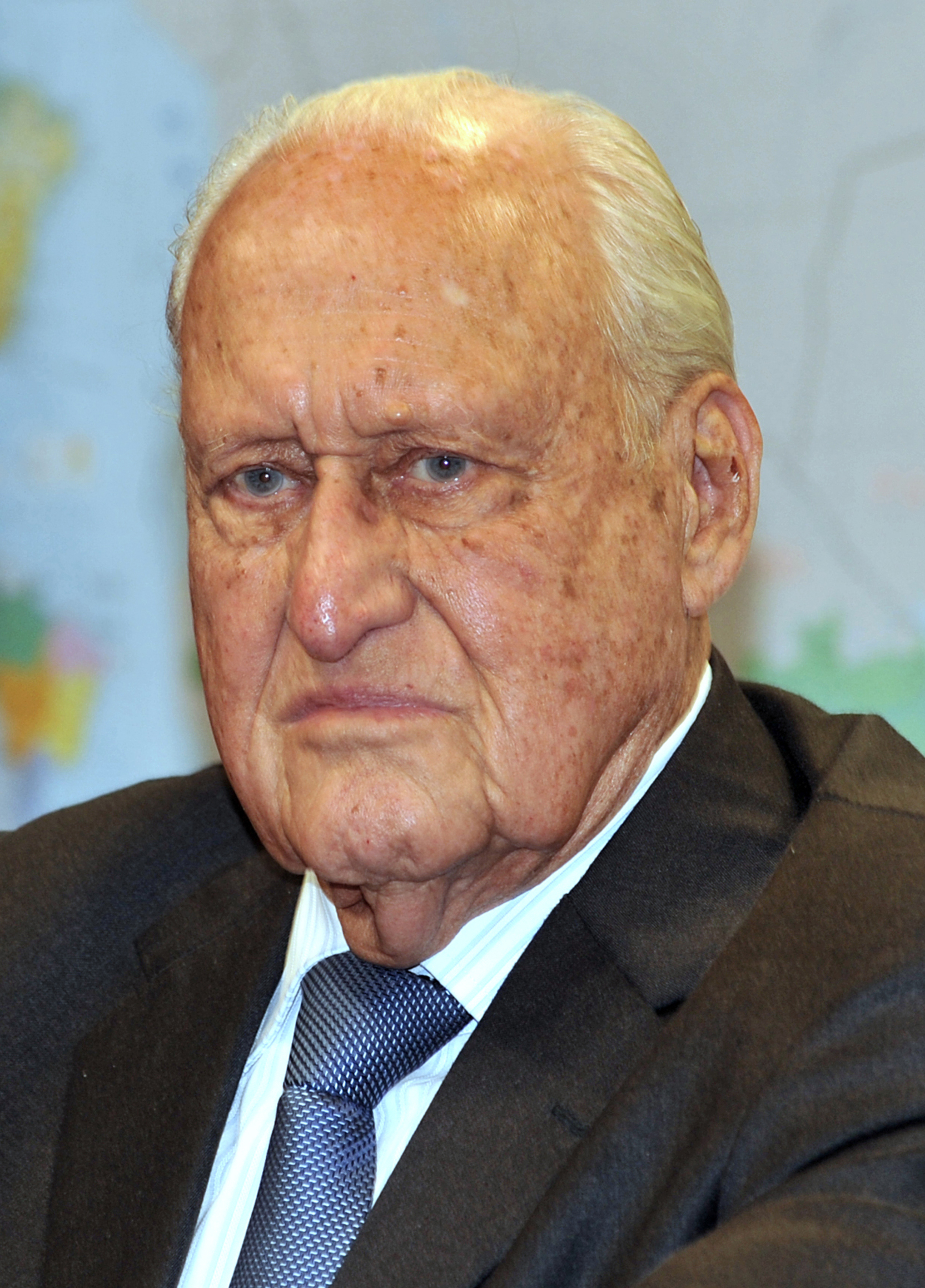
João Havelange

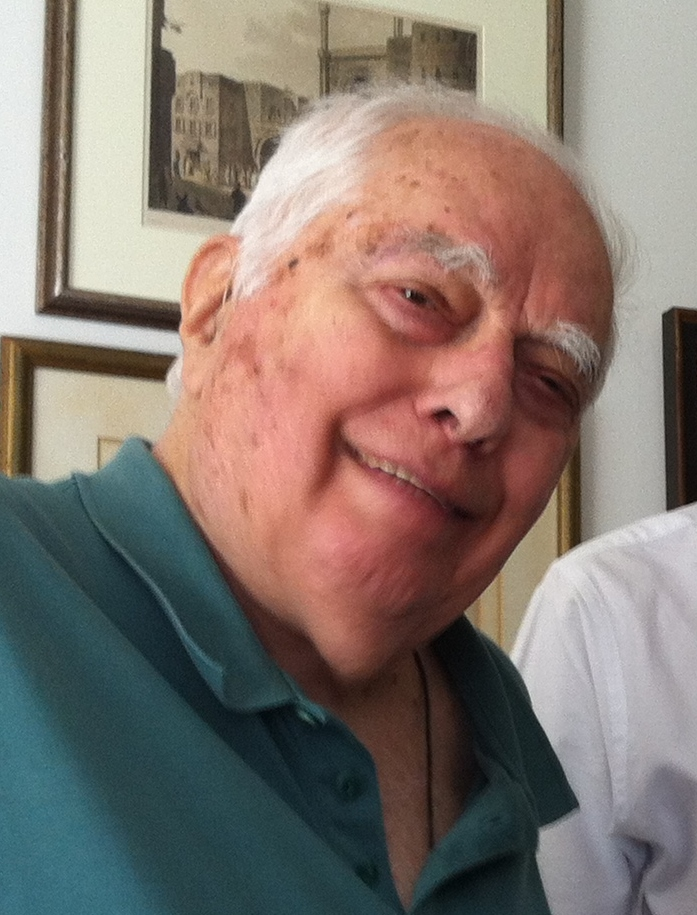
Bernard Lewis

- May 1 – Glenn Ford, Canadian-born American actor (d. 2006)
- May 4 – Jane Jacobs, American-born Canadian urban activist (d. 2006)
- May 5 – Zail Singh, Indian politician and 7th President of India (d. 1994)
- May 6
  - Adriana Caselotti, American actress (d. 1997)
  - Robert H. Dicke, American experimental physicist (d. 1997)
- May 8
  - Chinmayananda Saraswati, Indian spiritual leader (d. 1993)
  - João Havelange, Brazilian industrialist and football league president (d. 2016)
- May 10 – Milton Babbitt, American composer (d. 2011)
- May 11 – Camilo José Cela, Spanish writer, Nobel Prize laureate (d. 2002)
- May 16 – Ephraim Katzir, 4th President of Israel (d. 2009)
- May 17 – Jenő Fock, 49th Prime Minister of Hungary (d. 2001)
- May 20
  - Owen Chadwick, British historian of Christianity (d. 2015)
  - Trebisonda Valla, Italian athlete (d. 2006)
- May 21
  - Leonard Manasseh, British architect (d. 2017)
  - Lydia Mendoza, American musician (d. 2007)
  - Harold Robbins, American novelist (d. 1997)
  - Tan Siew Sin, Malaysian minister of Commerce and Industry (d. 1988)
- May 26
  - Halil İnalcık, Turkish historian (d. 2016)
  - Henriette Roosenburg, Dutch journalist (d. 1972)
- May 31
  - Denise Albe-Fessard, French neuroscientist (d. 2003)
  - Bert Haanstra, Dutch filmmaker (d. 1997)
  - Bernard Lewis, British-born American historian (d. 2018)

=== June ===
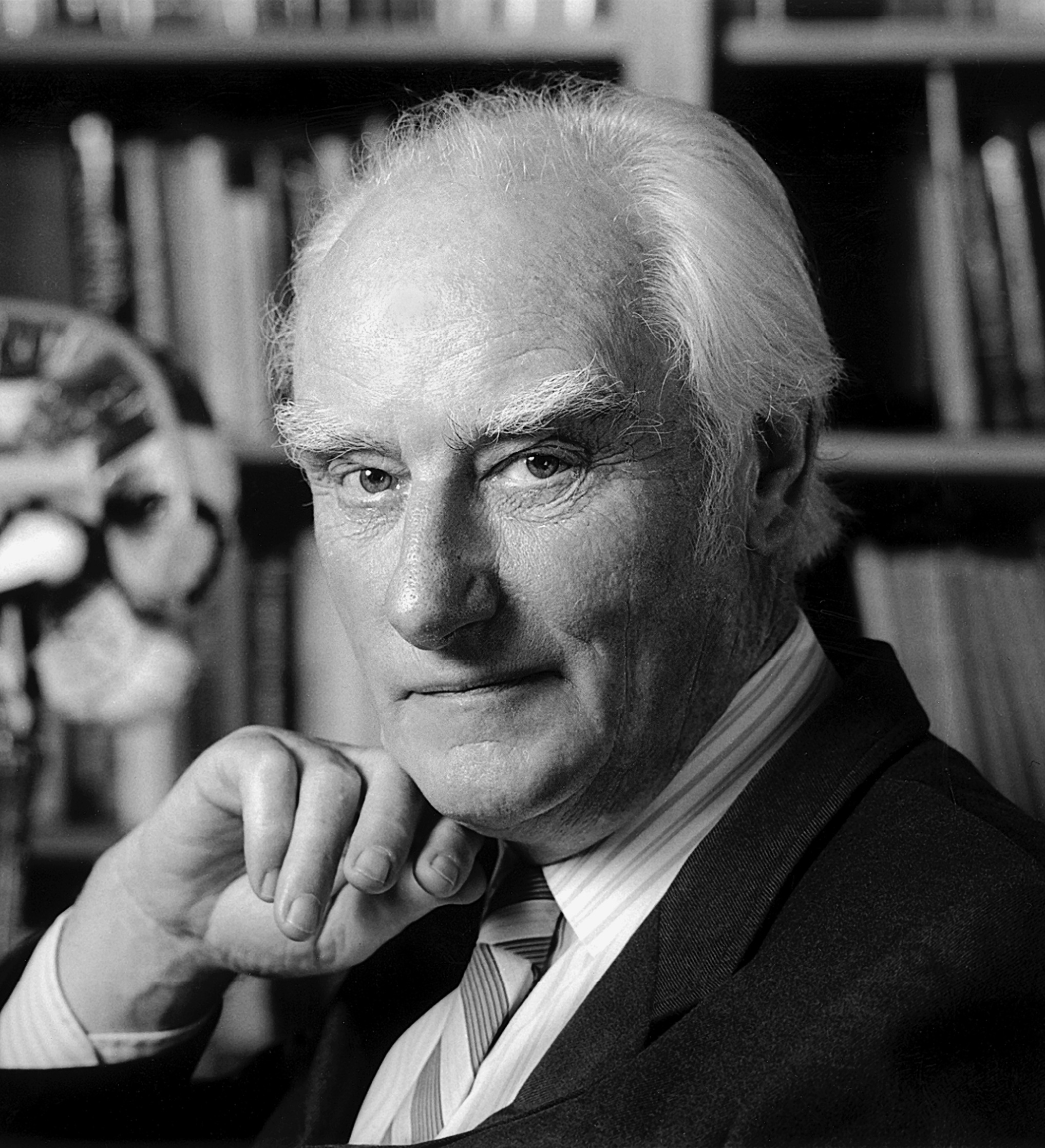
Francis Crick

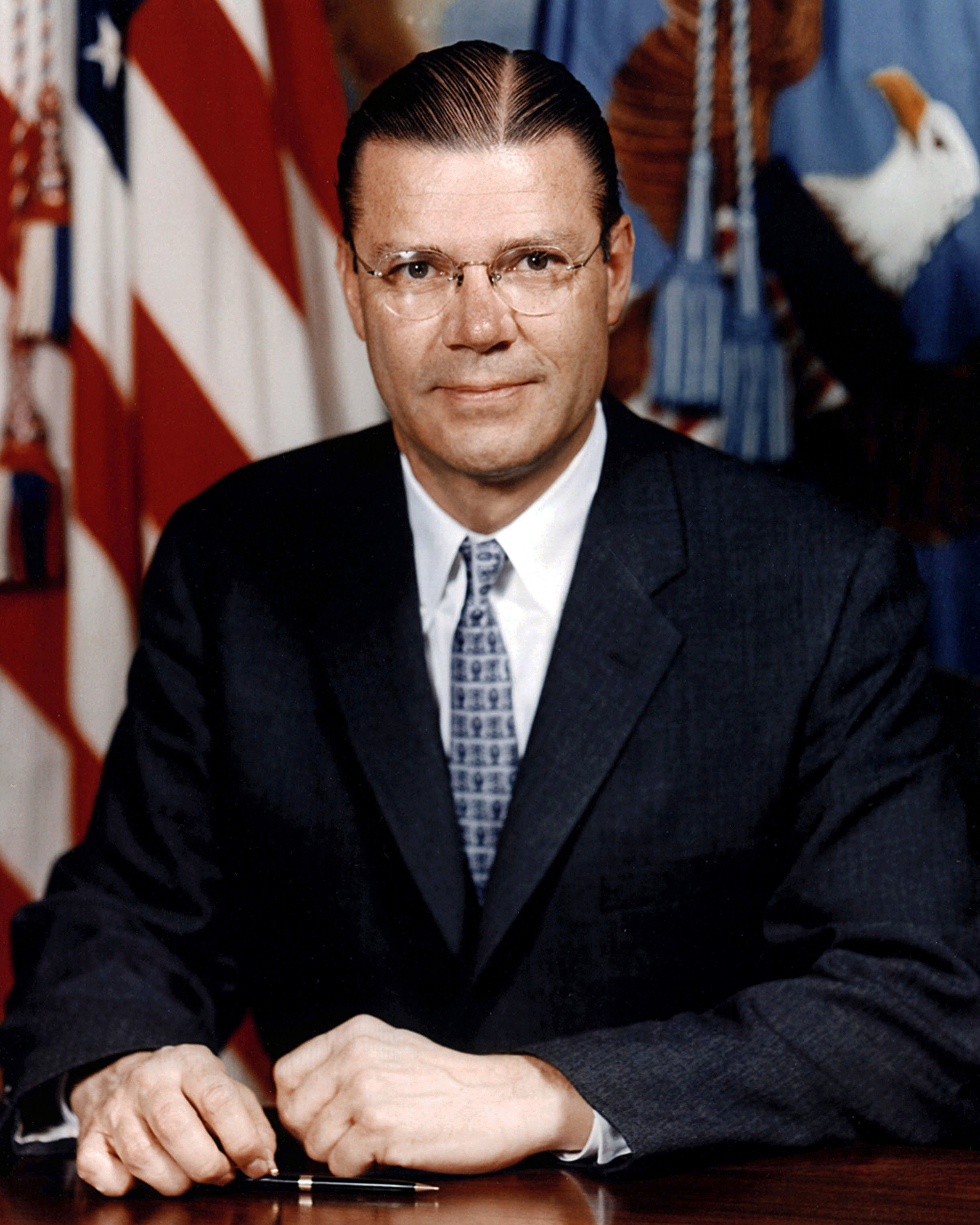
Robert McNamara

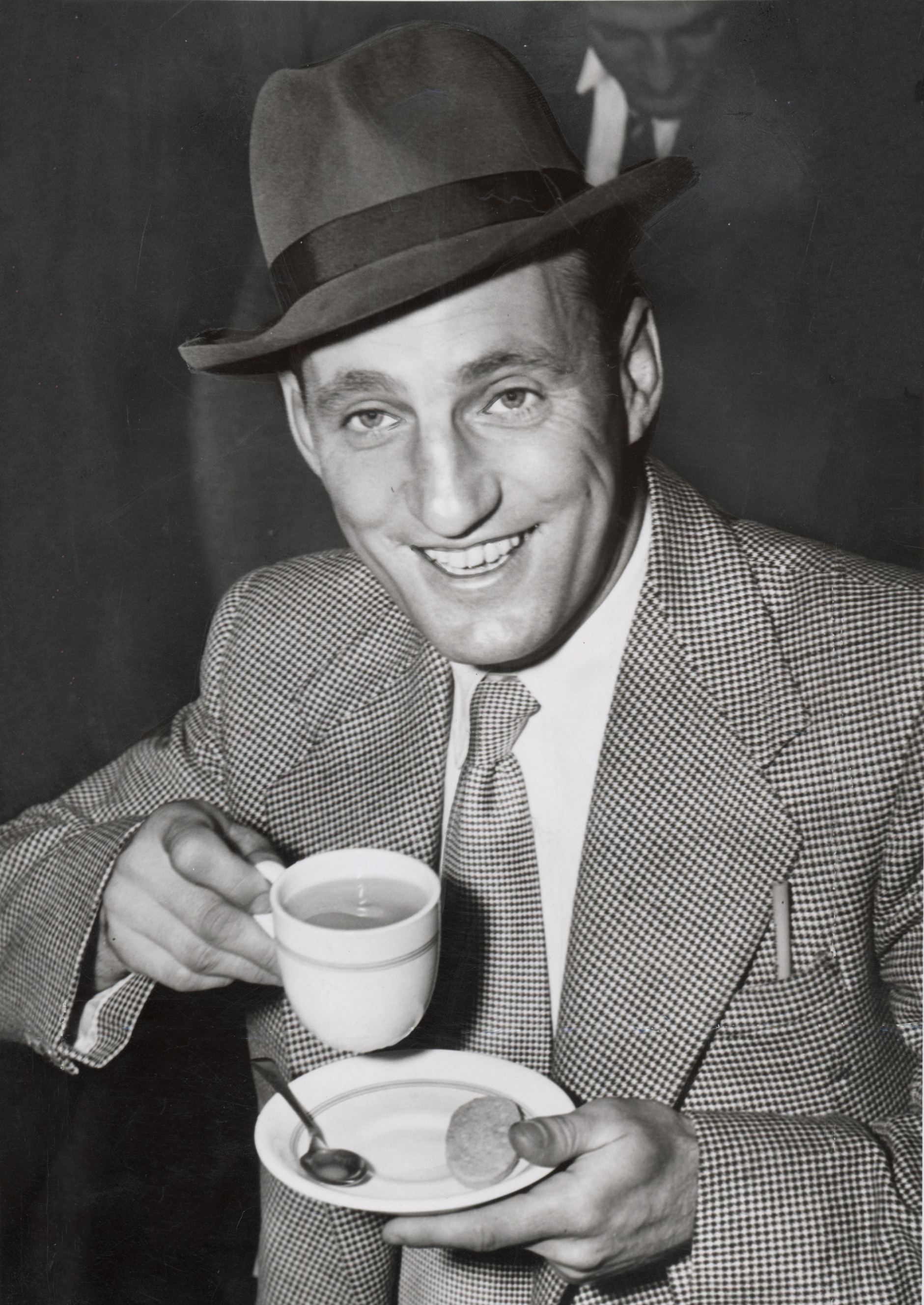
Len Hutton

- June 4 – Robert F. Furchgott, American chemist, recipient of the Nobel Prize in Physiology or Medicine (d. 2009)
- June 6 – Hamani Diori, 1st President of Niger (d. 1989)
- June 8 – Francis Crick, English molecular biologist, recipient of the Nobel Prize in Physiology or Medicine (d. 2004)
- June 9 – Robert McNamara, 8th United States Secretary of Defense (d. 2009)
- June 11 – Bob Berry, New Zealand dendrologist (d. 2018)
- June 12 – Raúl Héctor Castro, American politician and diplomat (d. 2015)
- June 14 – Dorothy McGuire, American actress (d. 2001)
- June 15 – Herbert A. Simon, American economist, Nobel Prize laureate (d. 2001)
- June 17 – Einar Englund, Finnish composer (d. 1999)
- June 18 – Julio César Turbay Ayala, 25th President of Colombia (d. 2005)
- June 22
  - Anne Olivier Bell, English literary editor and art scholar (d. 2018)
  - Emil Fackenheim, German-born Israeli Jewish philosopher and Reform rabbi (d. 2003)
- June 23
  - Len Hutton, English cricketer (d. 1990)
  - Irene Worth, American actress (d. 2002)
- June 24
  - Saloua Raouda Choucair, Lebanese painter and sculptor (d. 2017)
  - Lidia Wysocka, Polish actress (d. 2006)
  - William B. Saxbe, American politician (d. 2010)
- June 26 – Alvin Wistert, American football player (d. 2005)
- June 29 – Ruth Warrick, American actress (d. 2005)

=== July ===
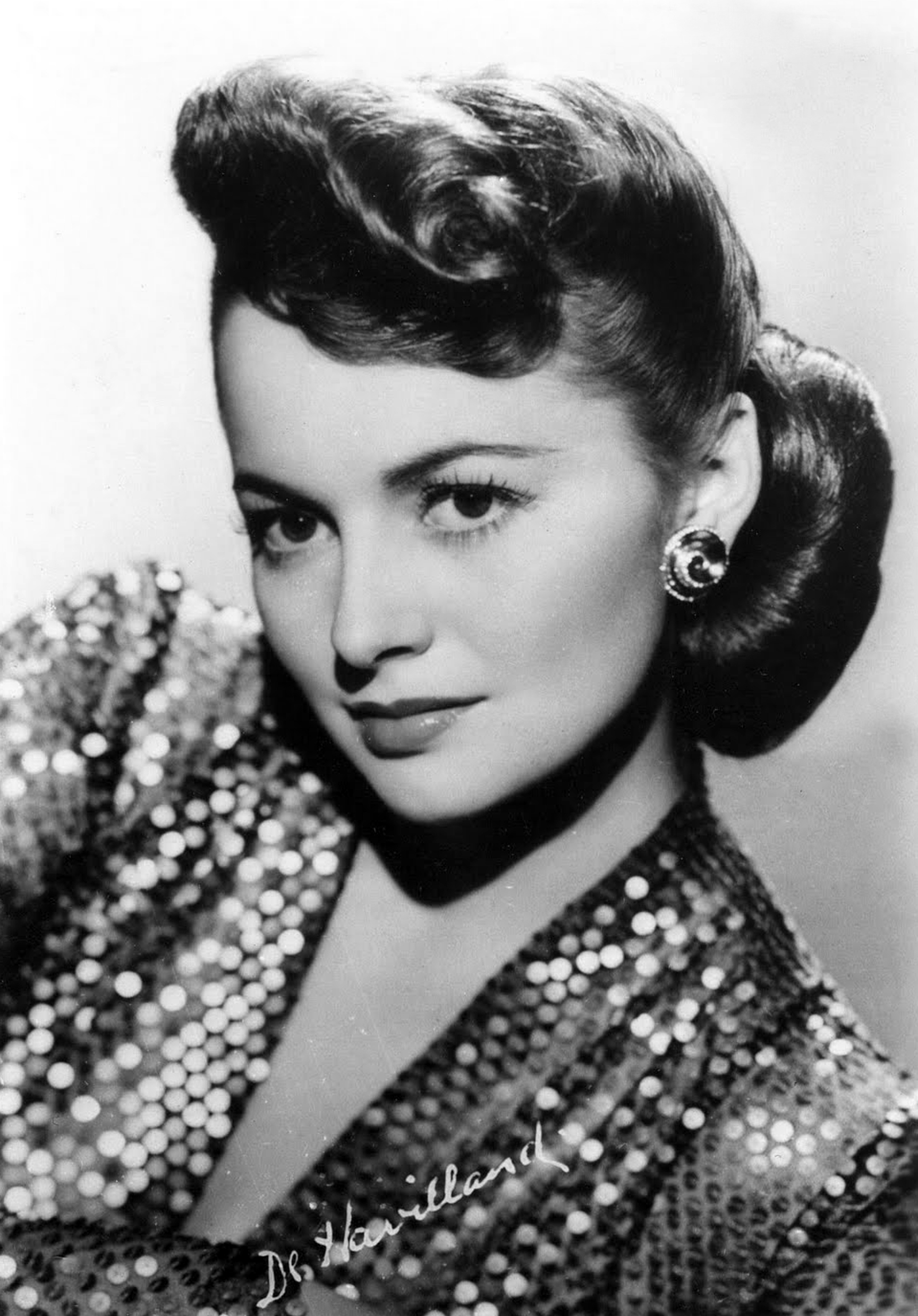
Dame Olivia de Havilland

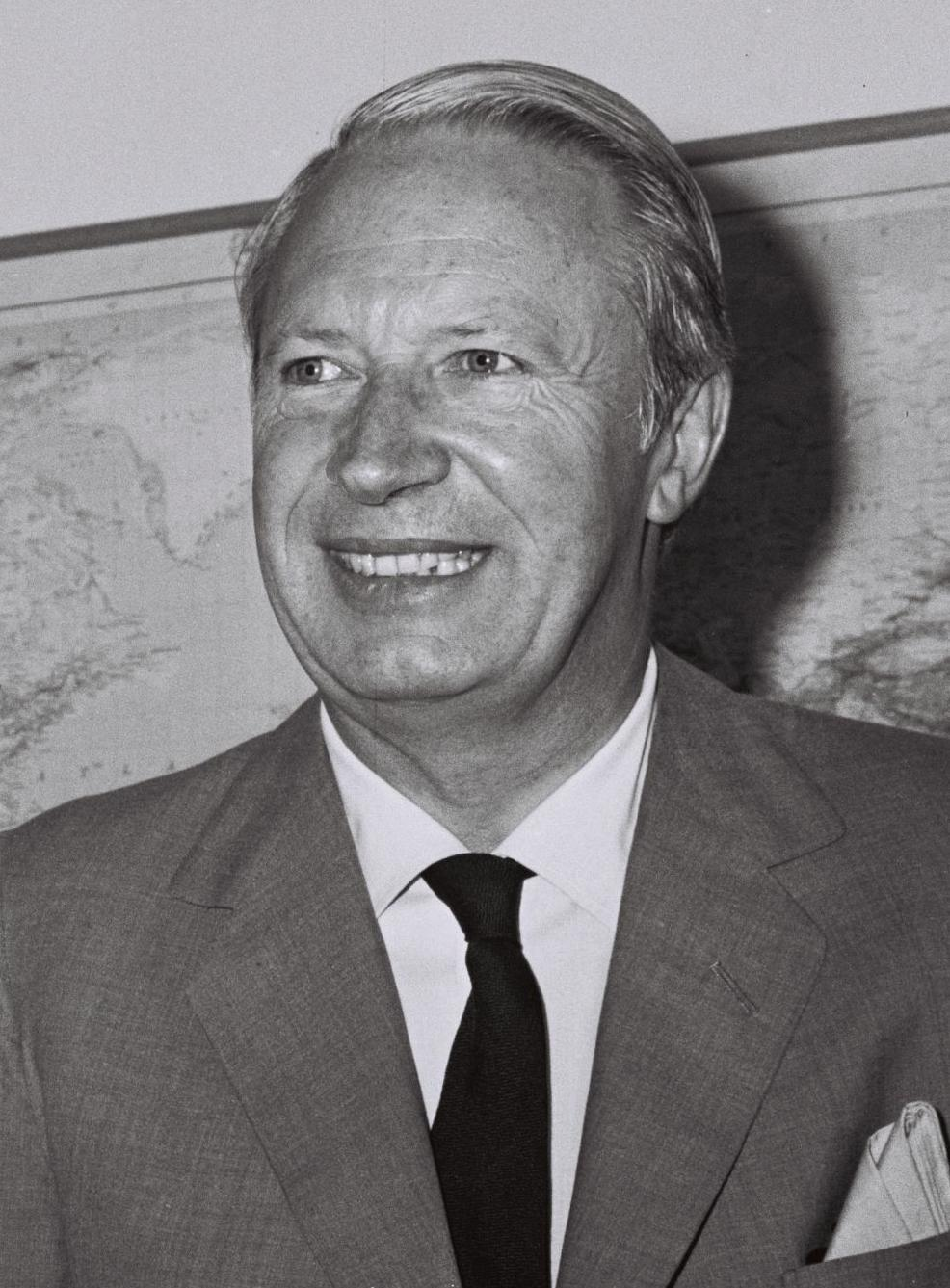
Sir Edward Heath

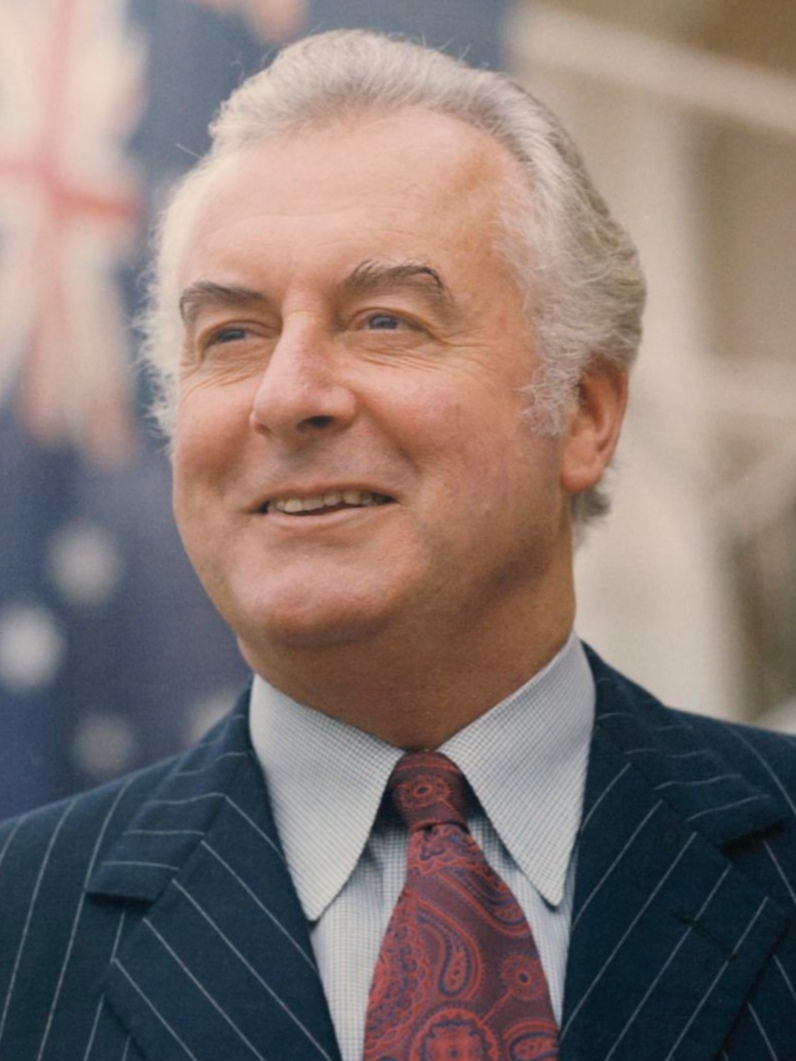
Gough Whitlam

- July 1
  - Olivia de Havilland, British-American film actress (d. 2020)
  - Lawrence Halprin, American architect (d. 2009)
- July 2
  - Zélia Gattai, Brazilian author and photographer (d. 2008)
  - Hans-Ulrich Rudel, German WWII pilot (d. 1982)
- July 3 – John Kundla, American basketball coach (d. 2017)
- July 4
  - Iva Toguri D'Aquino ("Tokyo Rose"), American propaganda broadcaster (d. 2006)
  - Adam Curle, British academic and peace activist (d. 2006)
  - Naseem Banu, Indian actress (d. 2002)
- July 5 – Ivor Powell, Welsh footballer (d. 2012)
- July 8 – Ronald R. Van Stockum, British-born American military officer and writer (d. 2022)
- July 9
  - Edward Heath, Prime Minister of the United Kingdom (d. 2005)
  - Teun Roosenburg, Dutch sculptor (d. 2004)
- July 11
  - Mortimer Caplin, American lawyer and educator (d. 2019)
  - Alexander Prokhorov, Russian physicist, Nobel laureate (d. 2002)
  - Reg Varney, British actor (d. 2008)
  - Gough Whitlam, 21st Prime Minister of Australia (d. 2014)
- July 14 – Natalia Ginzburg, Italian author (d. 1991)
- July 16 – Sudono Salim, Indonesian businessman (d. 2012)
- July 17 – Eleanor Hadley, American economist and policymaker (d. 2007)
- July 18 – L. Patrick Gray III, American Federal Bureau of Investigation director (d. 2005)
- July 20 – Hans von Blixen-Finecke Jr., Swedish army officer and Olympic equestrian (d. 2005)
- July 22
  - William Harper, Rhodesian politician (d. 2006)
  - Marcel Cerdan, French boxer (d. 1949)
- July 27 – Keenan Wynn, American actor (d. 1986)
- July 29 – Rupert Hamer, Australian politician and Premier of Victoria (d. 2004)
- July 31 – Ignacio Trelles, Mexican football player and coach (d. 2020)

=== August ===
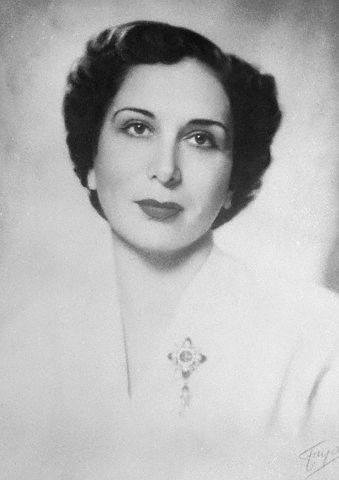
Zein al-Sharaf bint Jamil

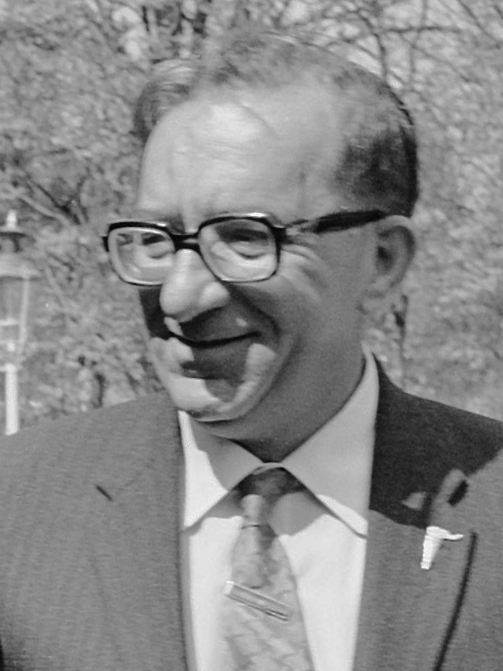
Dom Mintoff

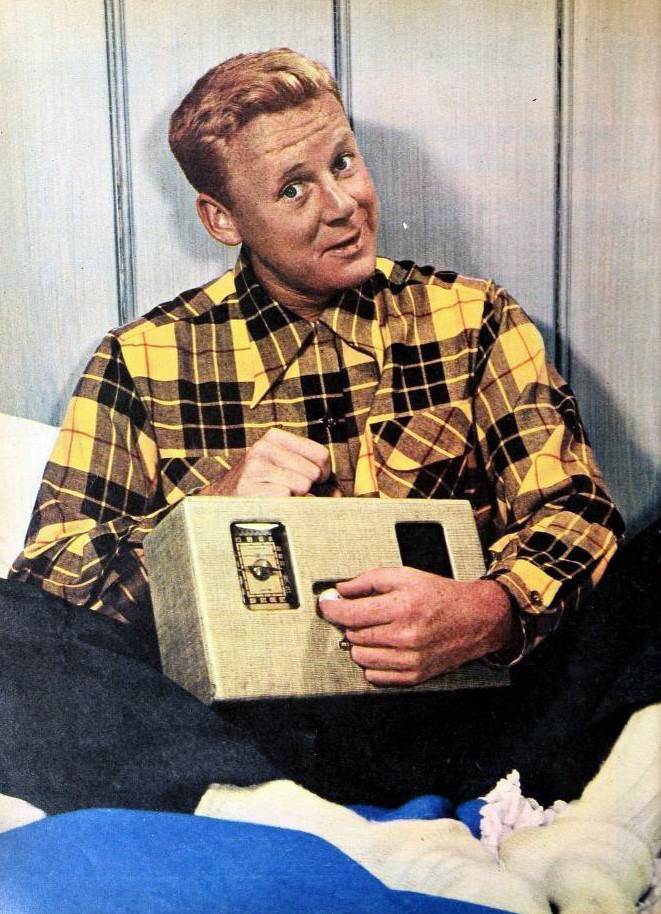
Van Johnson

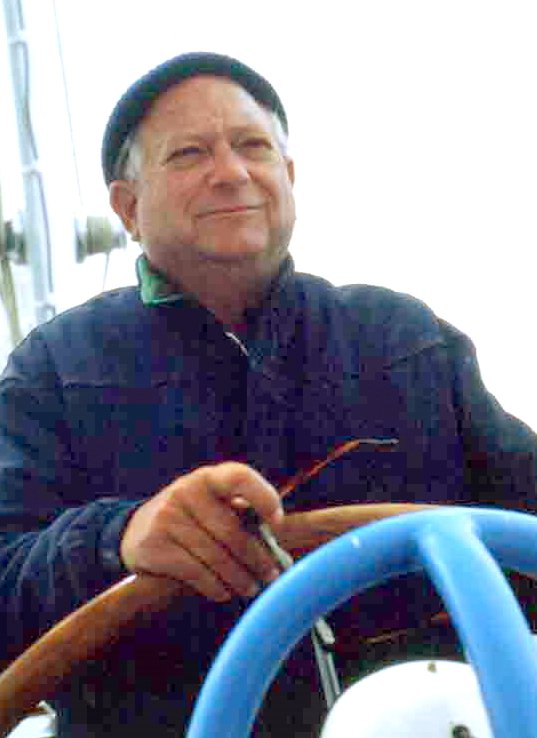
Jack Vance

- August 1 – Fiorenzo Angelini, Italian cardinal (d. 2014)
- August 2 – Zein al-Sharaf bint Jamil, Queen of Jordan (d. 1994)
- August 6 – Dom Mintoff, 8th Prime Minister of Malta (d. 2012)
- August 7 – Lawrence Picachy, Indian Jesuit priest (d. 1992)
- August 9 – Manea Mănescu, 50th Prime Minister of Romania (d. 2009)
- August 10 – Lorna McDonald, Australian historian and author (d. 2017)
- August 11 – Johnny Claes, English racing driver (d. 1956)
- August 14
  - Heinrich Prinz zu Sayn-Wittgenstein, German night fighter pilot and flying ace (d. 1944)
  - Ralph de Toledano, American conservationist and author (d. 2007)
- August 18 – Neagu Djuvara, Romanian historian, essayist, and diplomat (d. 2018)
- August 20 – George Rosenkranz, Mexican co-inventor of oral contraceptive pill (d. 2019)
- August 21
  - Geoffrey Keen, English actor (d. 2005)
  - Consuelo Velázquez, Mexican songwriter (d. 2005)
- August 24
  - Hal Smith, American actor (d. 1994)
  - Léo Ferré, French-born Monégasque poet and composer (d. 1993)
- August 25
  - Van Johnson, American actor (d. 2008)
  - Frederick Chapman Robbins, American pediatrician and virologist, winner of the Nobel Prize in Physiology or Medicine (d. 2003)
  - Saburō Sakai, Japanese fighter ace (d. 2000)
- August 27
  - Martha Raye, American actress (d. 1994)
  - Larry Thor, Canadian actor (d. 1976)
- August 28
  - C. Wright Mills, American sociologist (d. 1962)
  - Jack Vance, American writer (d. 2013)
- August 31 – Daniel Schorr, American journalist (d. 2010)

=== September ===
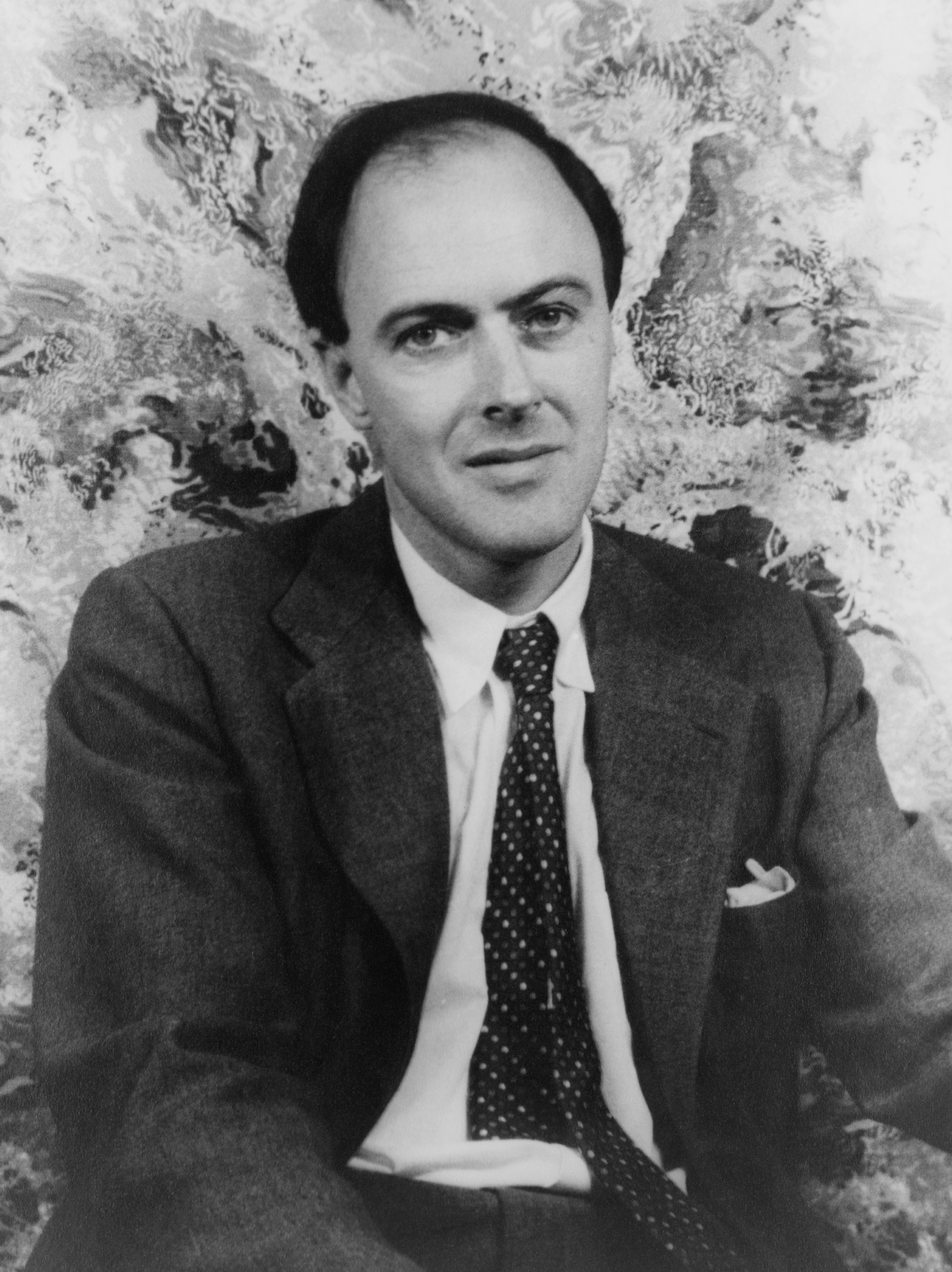
Roald Dahl

Aldo Moro

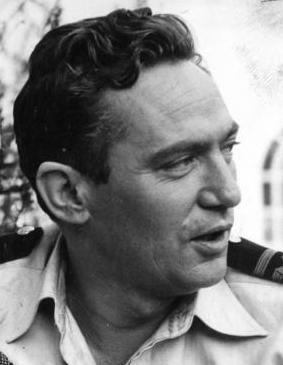
Peter Finch

- September 1 – Dorothy Cheney, American tennis player (d. 2014)
- September 3 – Tommy J. Smith, Australian racehorse trainer (d. 1998)
- September 5
  - Allan Louisy, 2nd Prime Minister of Saint Lucia (d. 2011)
  - Frank Yerby, American writer (d. 1991)
- September 13 – Roald Dahl, British children's writer (d. 1990)
- September 14 – John Heyer, Australian documentary filmmaker (d. 2001)
- September 15
  - Margaret Lockwood, Indian-born English actress (d. 1990)
  - Frederick C. Weyand, U.S. Army general (d. 2010)
- September 17 – Mary Stewart, British fantasy and mystery writer (d. 2014)
- September 18 – John Jacob Rhodes, American politician and lawyer (d. 2003)
- September 21 – Zinovy Gerdt, Russian actor (d. 1996)
- September 23
  - Aldo Moro, 38th Prime Minister of Italy (d. 1978)
  - Haider Raza, 2nd Chief of Staff of the Pakistan Air Force (d. 1998)
- September 27
  - Trento Longaretti, Italian painter (d. 2017)
  - S. Yizhar, Israeli author (d. 2006)
- September 28 – Peter Finch, English-born Australian actor (d. 1977)

=== October ===
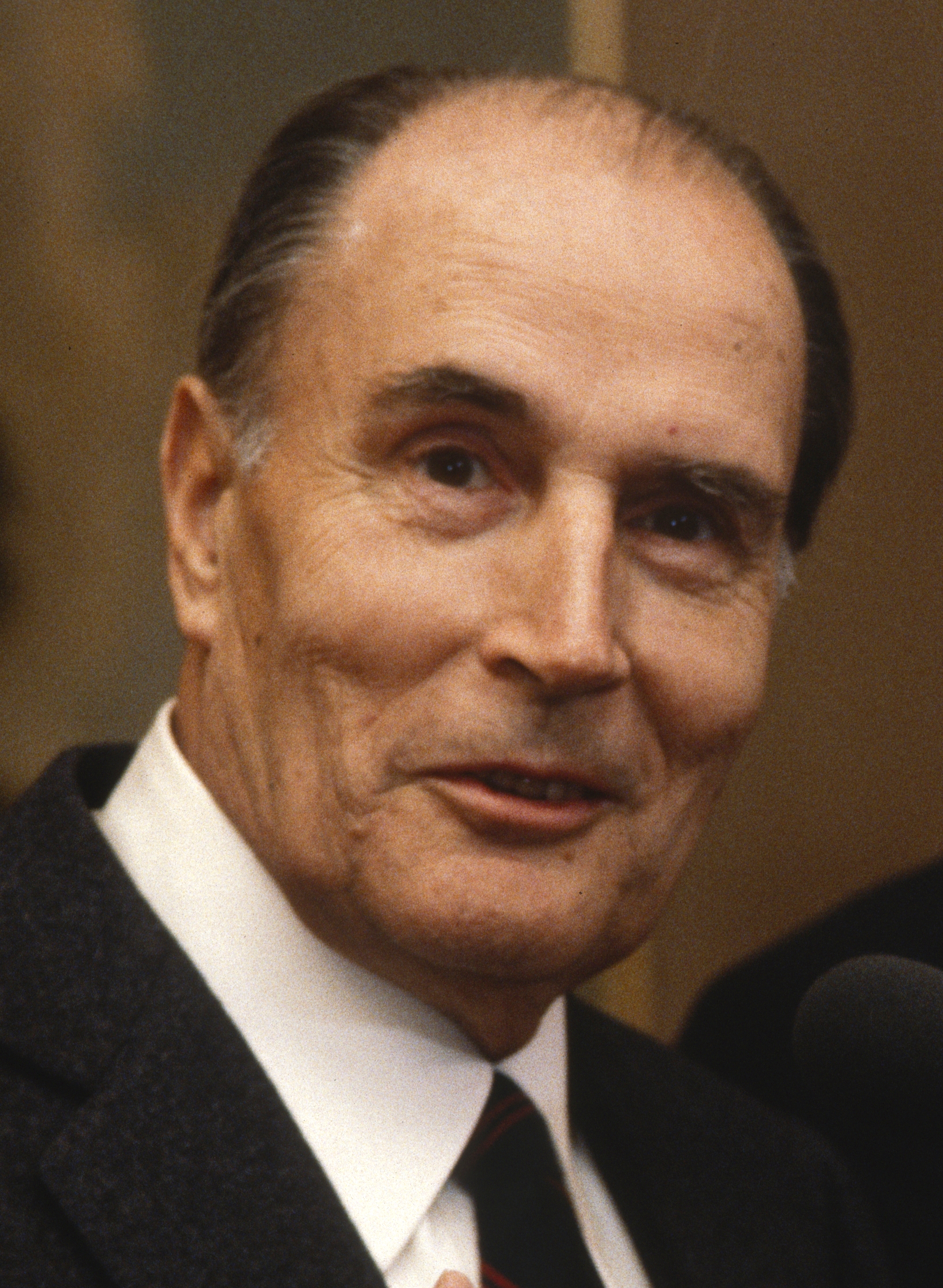
François Mitterrand

- October 3
  - Frank Pantridge, Northern Irish physician and inventor (d. 2004)
  - James Herriot, English veterinarian and author (d. 1995)
- October 4 – Vitaly Ginzburg, Russian physicist, Nobel laureate (d. 2009)
- October 6 – Otto Djaya, Indonesian painter (d. 2002)
- October 10 – Bernard Heuvelmans, French cryptozoologist (d. 2001)
- October 12 – Alice Childress, American actress, playwright, and novelist (d. 1994)
- October 14 – C. Everett Koop, United States Surgeon General (d. 2013)
- October 15 – Hassan Gouled Aptidon, President of Djibouti (d. 2006)
- October 19
  - Jean Dausset, French immunologist, recipient of the Nobel Prize in Physiology or Medicine (d. 2009)
  - Emil Gilels, Ukrainian pianist (d. 1985)
- October 26 – François Mitterrand, President of France (d. 1996)
- October 30 – Leon Day, American baseball player (d. 1995)
- October 31 – Carl Johan Bernadotte, Prince of Sweden (d. 2012)

=== November ===
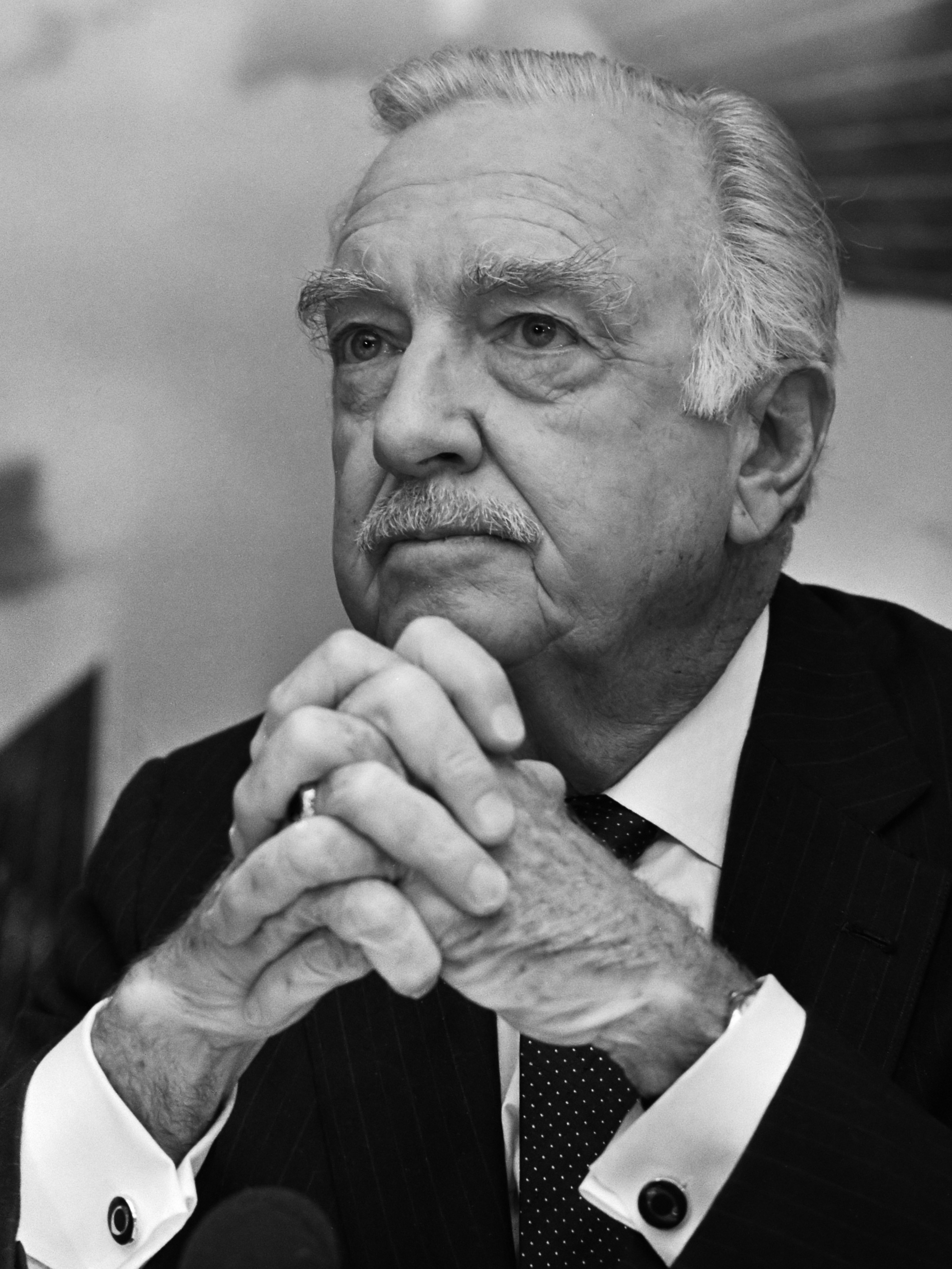
Walter Cronkite

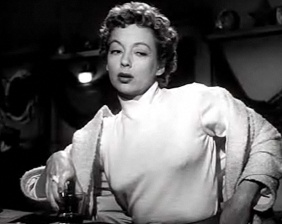
Evelyn Keyes

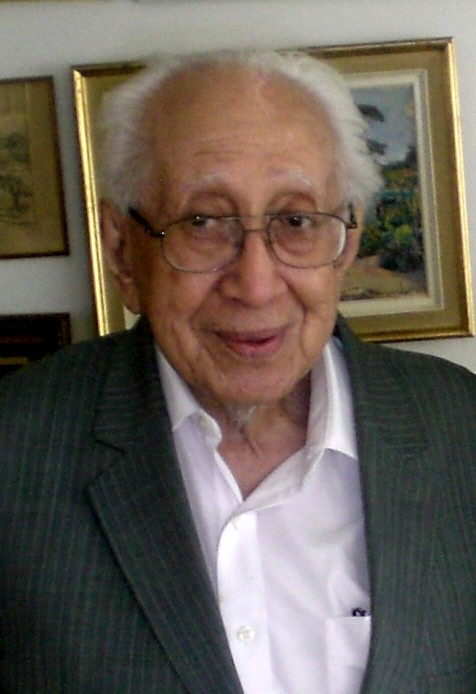
Ramón José Velásquez

- November 4 – Walter Cronkite, American television journalist (d. 2009)
- November 8 – Lady Ursula d'Abo, English socialite (d. 2017)
- November 10 – Louis le Brocquy, Irish painter (d. 2012)
- November 11 – Robert Carr, English politician (d. 2012)
- November 12 – Rogelio de la Rosa, Filipino actor and politician (d. 1986)
- November 15 – Bill Melendez, Mexican-born American animator (d. 2008)
- November 16 – Daws Butler, American voice actor (d. 1988)
- November 17 – Shelby Foote, American historian and novelist, author of The Civil War: A Narrative (d. 2005)
- November 20 – Evelyn Keyes, American actress (d. 2008)
- November 23
  - Michael Gough, Malayan-born English actor (d. 2011)
  - P. K. Page, Canadian poet (d. 2010)
- November 24 – Forrest J Ackerman, American writer (d. 2008)
- November 27 – Chick Hearn, American basketball announcer (d. 2002)
- November 28
  - Lilian, Princess of Réthy, born Mary Lilian Baels, English-born Belgian queen consort of Leopold III (d. 2002)
  - Ramón José Velásquez, 44th President of Venezuela (d. 2014)
- November 29
  - Helen Clare, British singer (d. 2018)
  - Fran Ryan, American actress (d. 2000)
- November 30 – Andrée de Jongh, Belgian Resistance worker (d. 2007

=== December ===
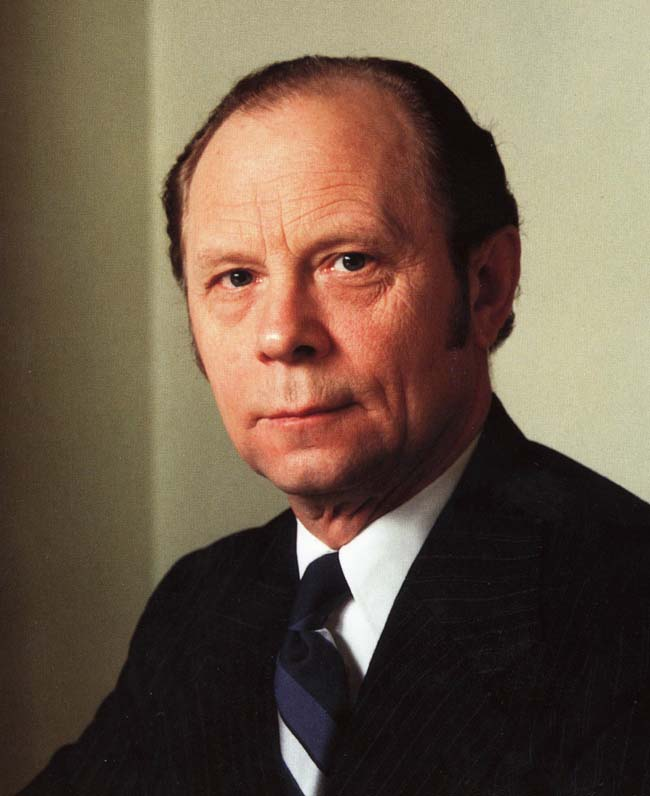
Kristján Eldjárn

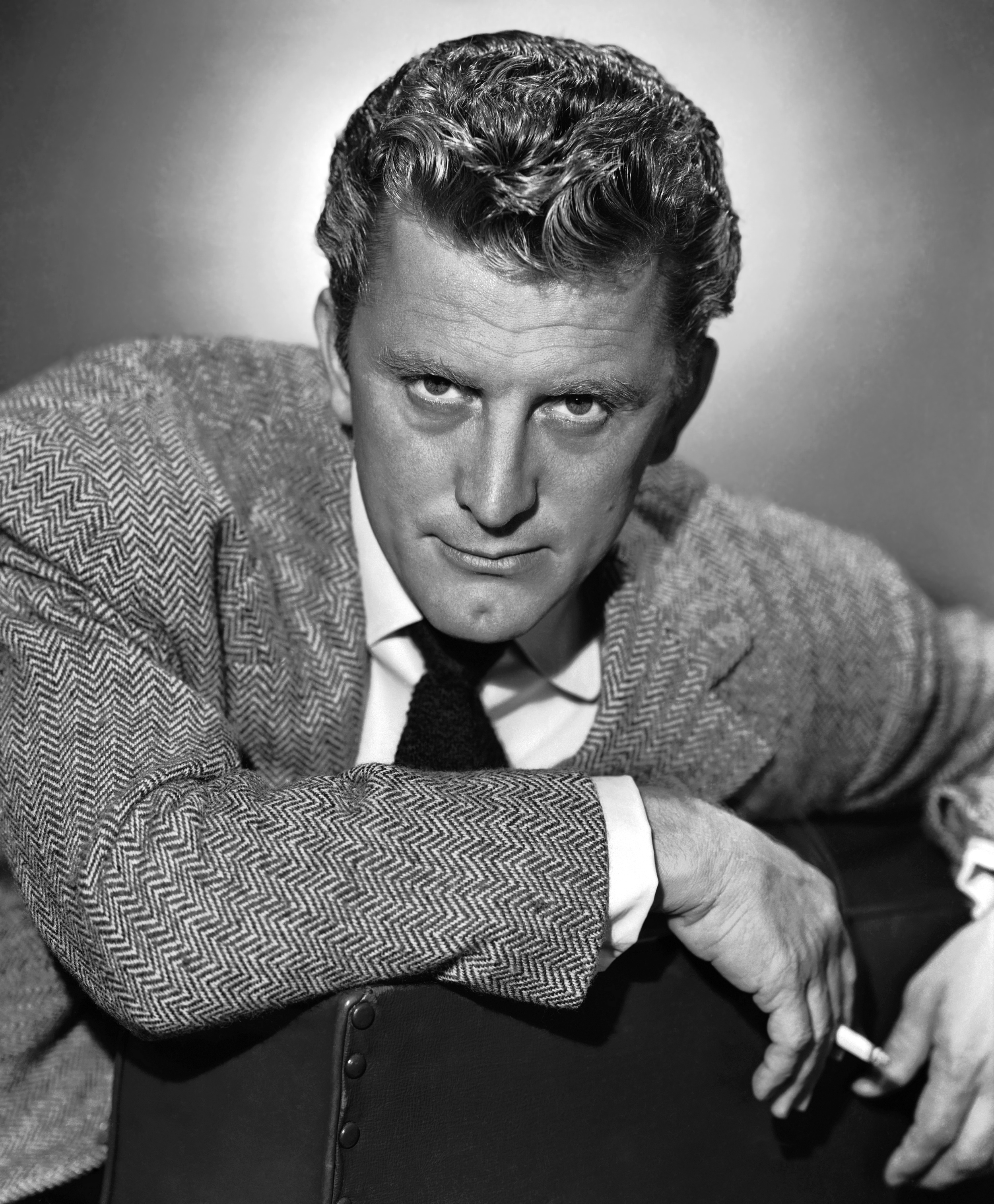
Kirk Douglas

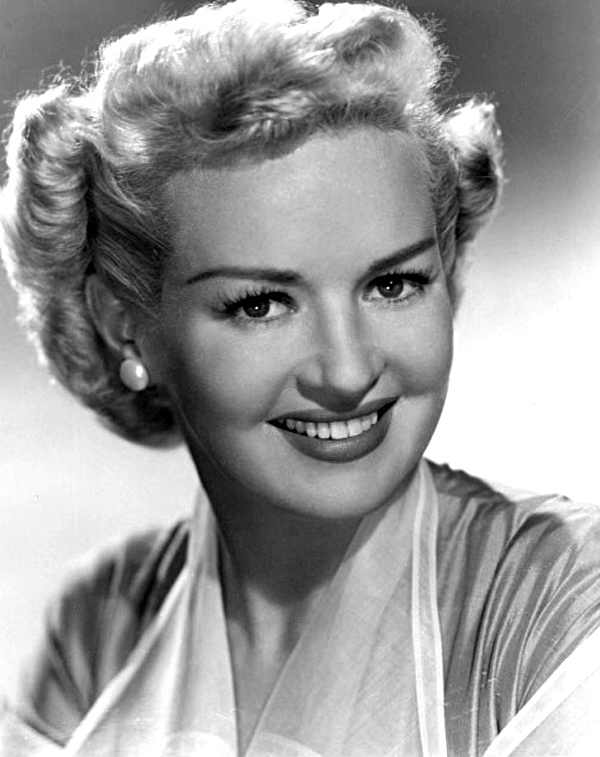
Betty Grable

- December 1 – Wan Li, Chinese government official (d. 2015)
- December 2 – Nancye Wynne Bolton, Australian tennis player (d. 2001)
- December 5 – Hilary Koprowski, Polish virologist and immunologist (d. 2013)
- December 6
  - Kristján Eldjárn, 3rd President of Iceland (d. 1982)
  - Pratap Chandra Lal, Indian chief of the Air Staff (d. 1982)
  - Trisno Sumardjo, Indonesian writer, translator, and painter (d. 1969)
- December 8
  - Richard Fleischer, American film director (d. 2006)
  - T. K. Whitaker, Irish economist and public servant (d. 2017)
- December 9
  - Kirk Douglas, American film actor (Spartacus) (d. 2020)
  - Esther Wilkins, American dental hygenist (d. 2016)
- December 11 – Pérez Prado, Cuban musician (d. 1989)
- December 14 – Shirley Jackson, American writer (d. 1965)
- December 15 – Maurice Wilkins, New Zealand-born British physicist, recipient of the Nobel Prize in Physiology or Medicine (d. 2004)
- December 18
  - Douglas Fraser, Scottish-born American union leader (d. 2008)
  - Betty Grable, American actress (d. 1973)
  - Franciszek Kornicki, Polish fighter pilot (d. 2017)
- December 19
  - Roy Baker, English film director (d. 2010)
  - Elisabeth Noelle-Neumann, German political scientist (d. 2010)
- December 22 – Dietrich Grunewald, Swedish-born American artist (d. 2003)
- December 24 – Cecília Schelingová, Slovak Roman Catholic religious professed, martyr and blessed (d. 1955)
- December 25 – Ahmed Ben Bella, Algerian politician, 1st President of Algeria (d. 2012)

=== Date unknown ===
- Saad Jumaa, 17th Prime Minister of Jordan (d. 1979)

== Deaths ==
=== January ===
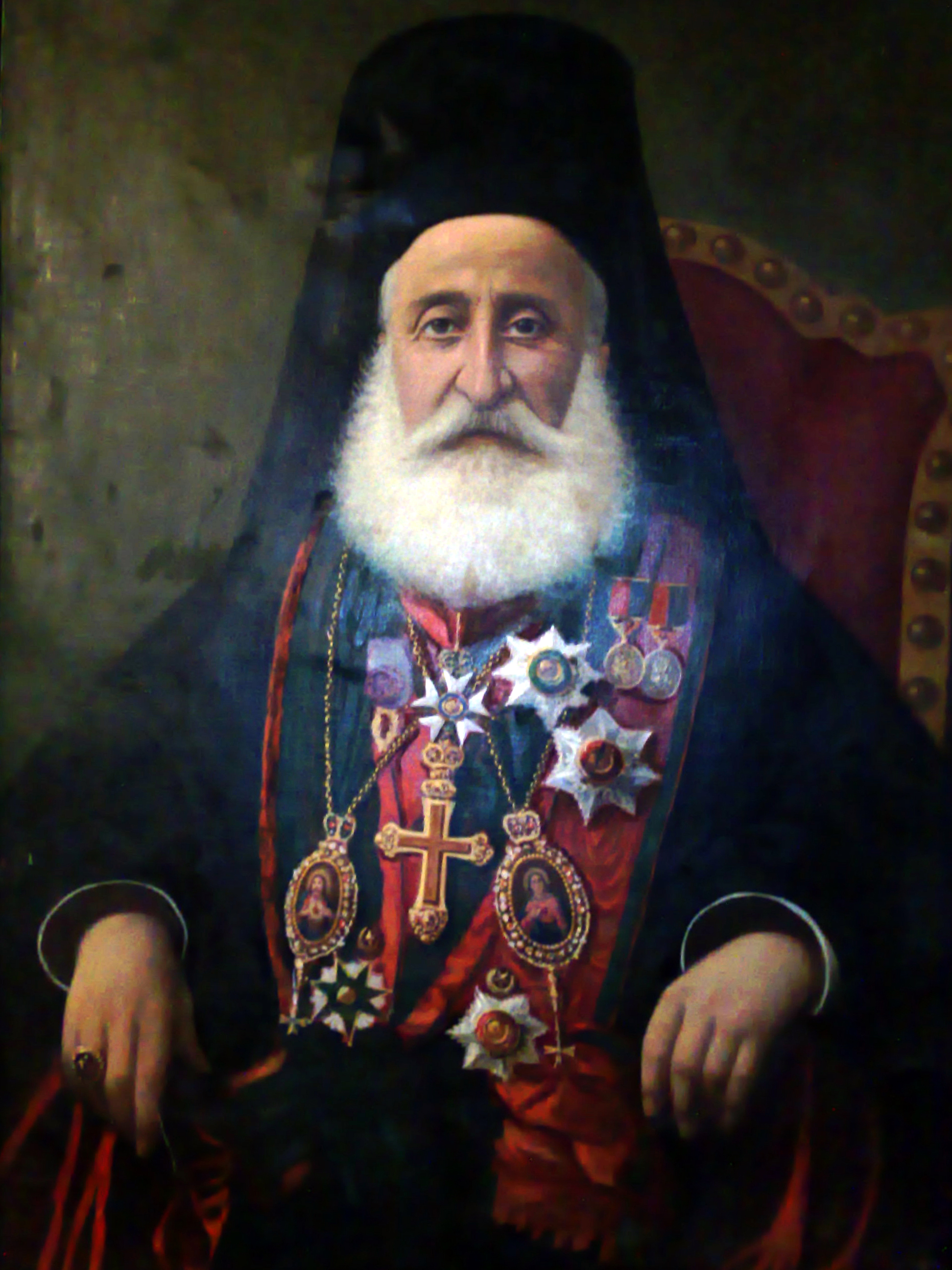
Patriarch Cyril VIII Geha

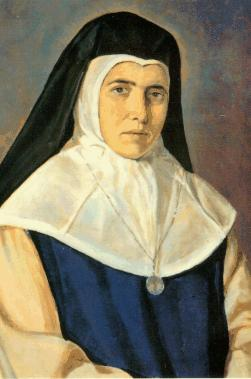
Blessed Juana María Condesa Lluch

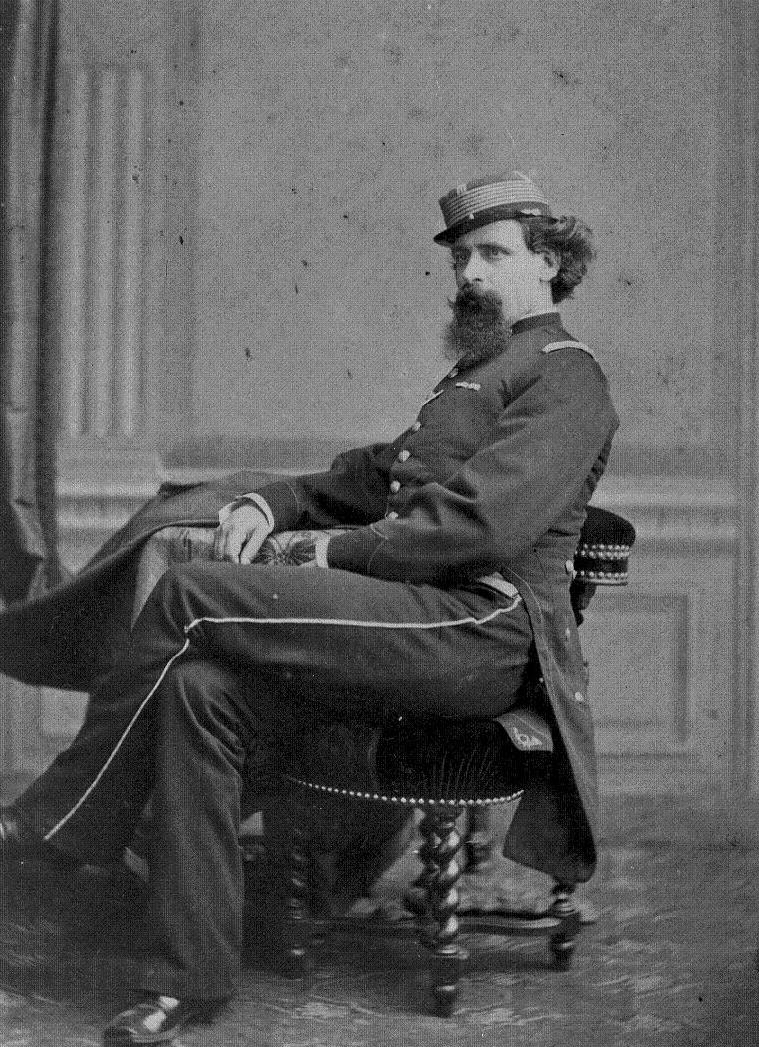
Lorenzo Latorre

- January 1
  - Max Bastelberger, German doctor and entomologist (b. 1851)
  - Adán Cárdenas, Nicaraguan doctor and politician, 16th President of Nicaragua (b. 1836)
- January 2
  - Joseph Rucker Lamar, Associate Justice of the Supreme Court of the United States (b. 1857)
  - Félix Sardà y Salvany, Spanish Roman Catholic priest and writer (b. 1844)
- January 5 – Ulpiano Checa, Spanish painter, sculptor and illustrator (b. 1860)
- January 7 – Andrés Baquero, Spanish teacher and writer (b. 1853)
- January 8
  - Rembrandt Bugatti, Italian sculptor (b. 1884)
  - Eugene W. Hilgard, German-born American soil scientist (b. 1833)
- January 9 – Ada Rehan, Irish-born American Shakespearean actress (b. 1859)
- January 10 – Guido Baccelli, Italian physician (b. 1830)
- January 11
  - Cyril VIII Geha, Greek Catholic patriarch (b. 1840)
  - Takashima Tomonosuke, Japanese general (b. 1844)
- January 12
  - Léon Autonne, French engineer and mathematician (b. 1859)
  - Georgios Theotokis, Greek politician, Prime Minister of Greece (b. 1844)
- January 13
  - George Bengescu-Dabija, Wallachian-born Romanian poet, playwright, and general (b. 1844)
  - Vasile Hossu, Romanian Orthodox priest and bishop (b. 1866)
  - Victoriano Huerta, Mexican general and statesman, 35th President of Mexico (b. 1850)
- January 14 – Otto Ammon, German anthropologist (b. 1842)
- January 15 – Vojtech Alexander, Slovak radiologist (b. 1857)
- January 16
  - Arnold Aletrino, Dutch physician (b. 1858)
  - William Montrose Graham Jr., American general (b. 1834)
  - Juana María Condesa Lluch, Spanish Roman Catholic religious professed and blessed (b. 1862)
- January 17 – Arthur V. Johnson, American actor and director (b. 1876)
- January 18 – Lorenzo Latorre, Uruguayan officer and politician, 11th President of Uruguay (b. 1844)
- January 19
  - Dora Knowlton Ranous, American actress, author and translator (b. 1859)
  - Antoine Simon, French composer (b. 1850)
- January 20 – Ephraim Francis Baldwin, American architect (b. 1837)
- January 30 – Sir Clements Markham, British explorer and geographer (b. 1830)

=== February ===
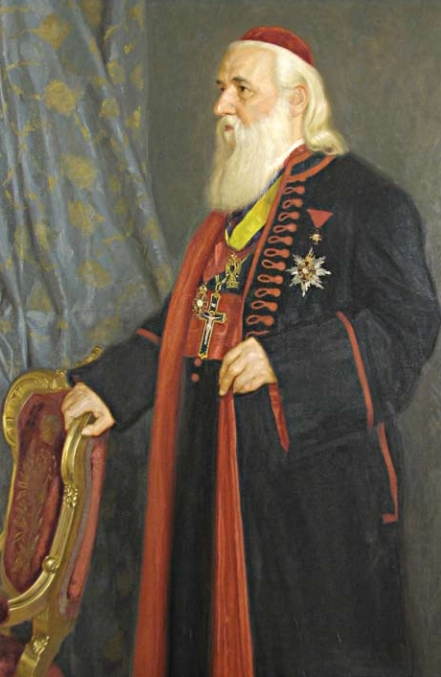
Metropolitan Ioan Mețianu

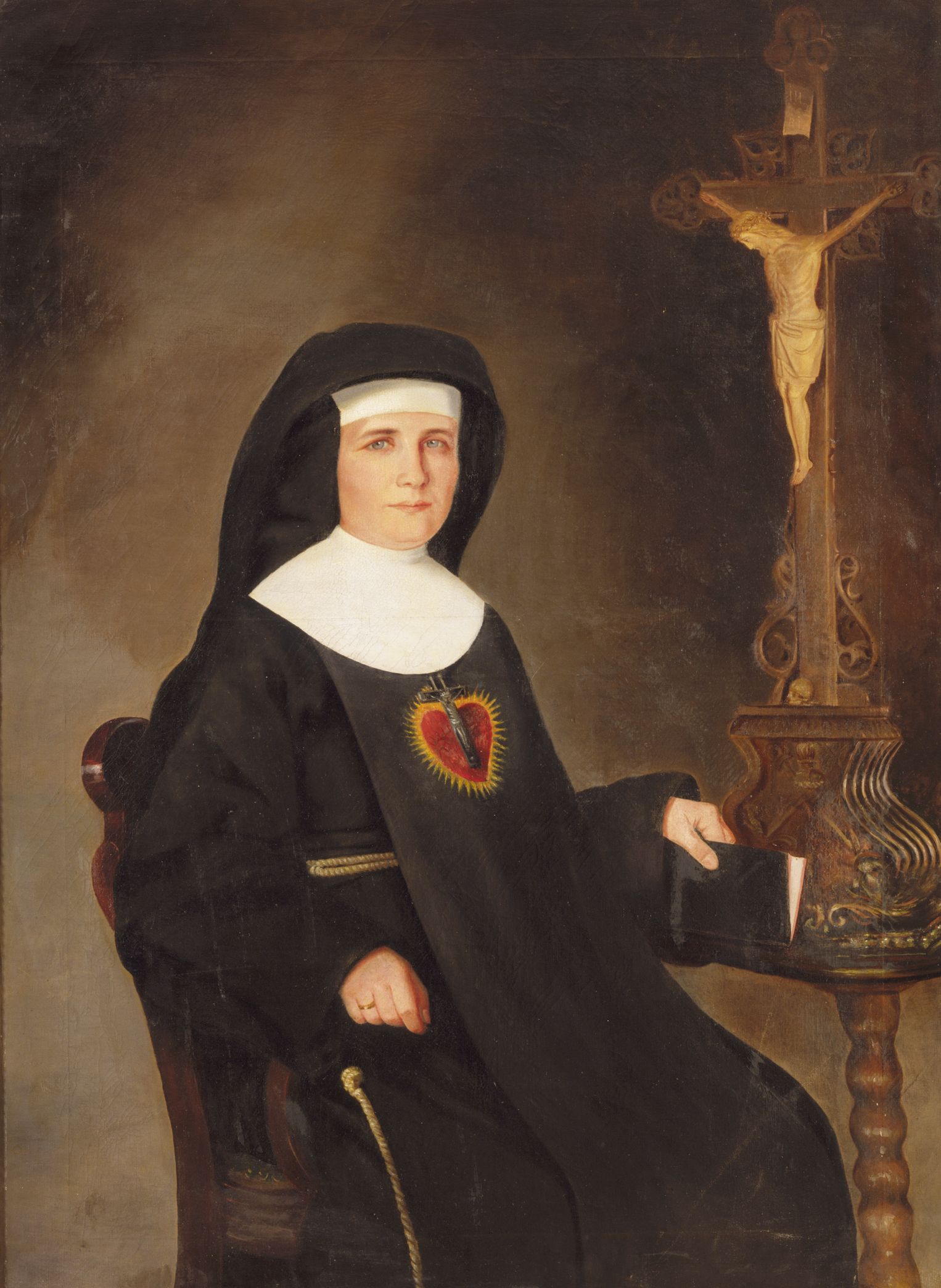
Blessed Ludwika Szczęsna

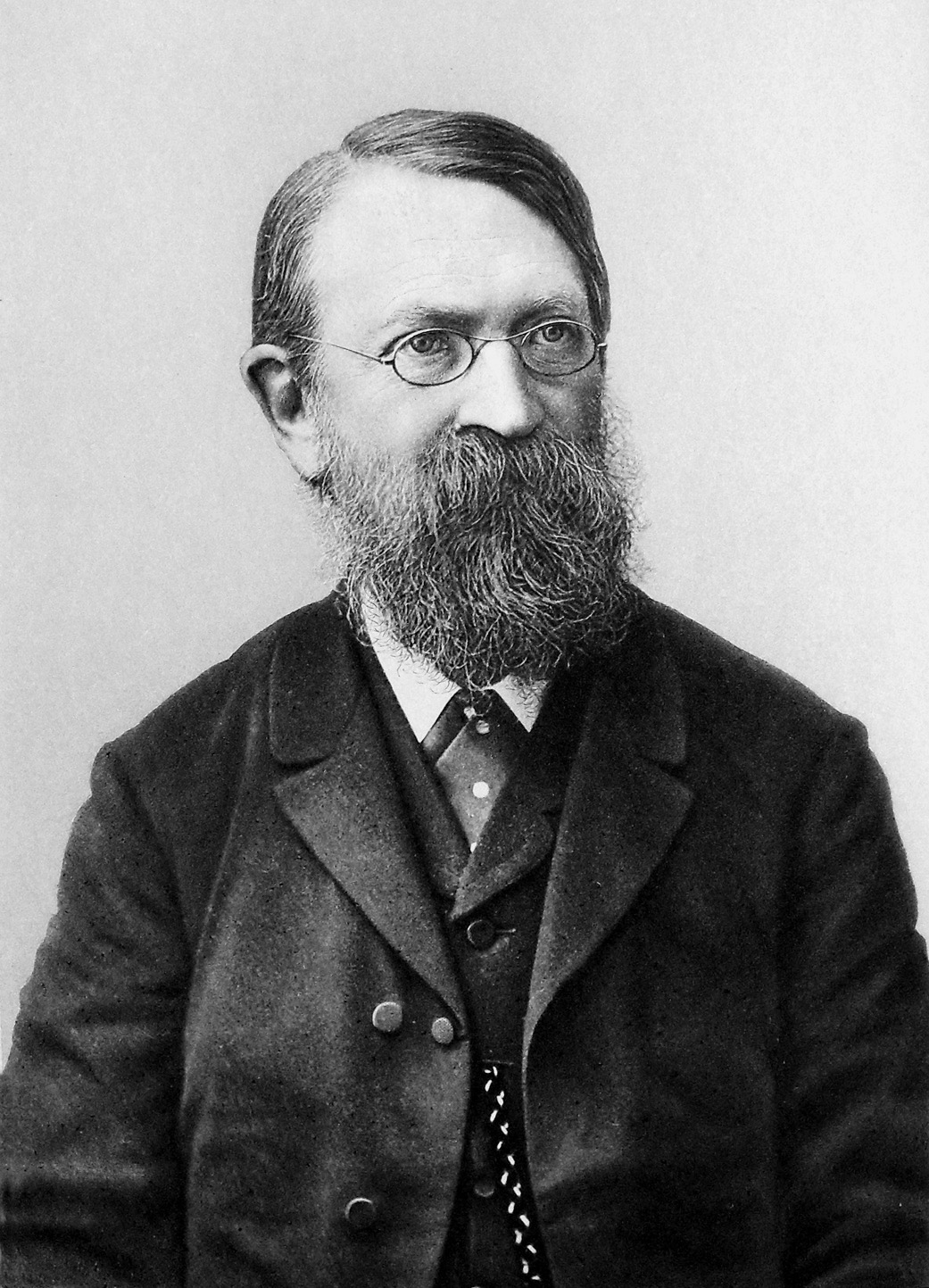
Ernst Mach

- February 3 – Metropolitan Ioan Mețianu, Romanian cleric (b. 1828)
- February 6
  - Rubén Darío, Nicaraguan writer (b. 1867)
  - Isala Van Diest, Belgian physician (b. 1842)
- February 7
  - Franklin E. Brooks, U.S. House of Representatives from Colorado (b. 1860)
  - Ludwika Szczęsna, Polish Roman Catholic nun and blessed (b. 1863)
- February 9 – Anton Yegorovich von Saltza, Russian general (b. 1843)
- February 12 – Richard Dedekind, German mathematician (b. 1831)
- February 13
  - Vilhelm Hammershøi, Danish painter (b. 1864)
  - Carlos Antonio Mendoza, Panamanian politician, acting President of Panama (b. 1856)
- February 18 – Hans Schmidt, German Roman Catholic priest (executed) (b. 1881)
- February 19 – Ernst Mach, Austrian physicist and philosopher (b. 1838)
- February 20 – Klas Pontus Arnoldson, Swedish writer and pacifist, recipient of the Nobel Peace Prize (b. 1844)
- February 21 – Karl Begas, German sculptor (b. 1845)
- February 23
  - Jabez Balfour, English businessman (b. 1843)
  - Domenico Lovisato, Italian geologist (b. 1842)
  - Hugo von Pohl, German admiral (b. 1855)
- February 25 – David Bowman, Australian politician (b. 1860)
- February 26 – Tomasa Ortiz Real, Spanish Roman Catholic religious professed and blessed (b. 1842)
- February 27 – Ugo Balzani, Italian historian (b. 1847)
- February 28 – Henry James, American writer (b. 1843)

=== March ===
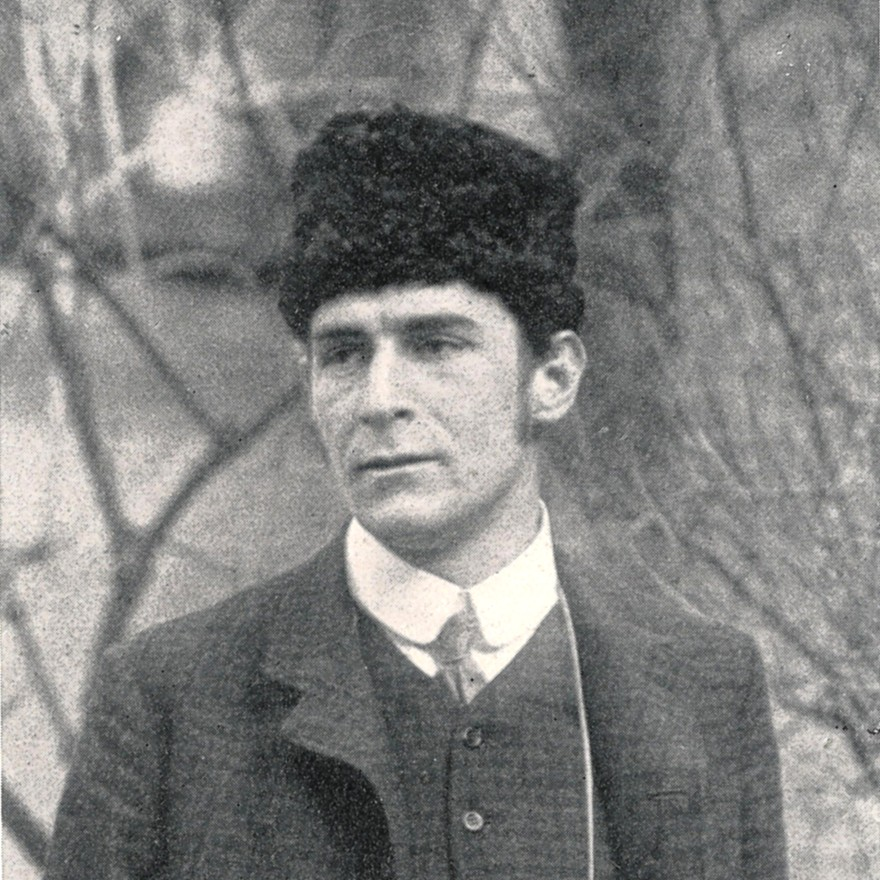
Franz Marc

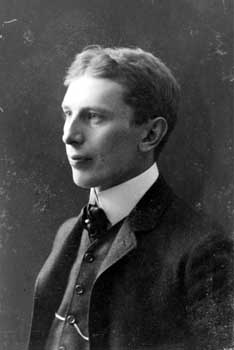
Herman Gesellius

- March 2 – Elisabeth of Wied, Queen consort of Romania (b. 1843)
- March 4
  - Franz Marc, German Expressionist painter (killed in action) (b. 1880)
  - William Sooy Smith, American Union general and engineer (b. 1830)
- March 7 – Fred Donovan, American baseball player (b. 1844)
- March 9 – Arnold Spencer-Smith, British explorer, clergyman, and amateur photographer (b. 1883)
- March 11
  - Florence Baker, Hungarian-born British explorer (b. 1841)
  - Henry G. Davis, American politician (b. 1823)
- March 12 – William M. O. Dawson, 12th Governor of West Virginia (b. 1853)
- March 15 – John Beveridge, Australian businessman, Mayor of Redfern (b. 1848)
- March 16 – Thomas King, New Zealand astronomer (b. 1858)
- March 19
  - John J. Davis, American politician, U.S. Representatives from West Virginia (b. 1835)
  - Girolamo Maria Gotti, Italian Discalced Carmelite friar and Roman Catholic cardinal (b. 1834)
  - Vasily Surikov, Russian painter (b. 1848)
- March 20 – Ota Benga, Congolese pygmy brought to America as part of an exhibition at the Bronx zoo (b. 1883)
- March 24
  - Herman Gesellius, French architect (b. 1874)
  - Enrique Granados, Spanish composer (ship sinking) (b. 1867)
- March 25 – Ishi, last known member of the Yana people (b. 1860)
- March 28 – Paul von Plehwe, Russian general (b. 1850)
- March 30 – Nakamuta Kuranosuke, Japanese admiral (b. 1837)

=== April ===
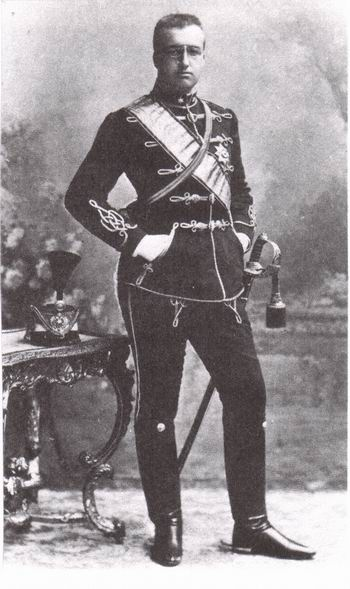
Prince Leopold Clement of Saxe-Coburg and Gotha

- April 4
  - Alfred Cogniaux, Belgian botanist (b. 1841)
  - Max Lewandowsky, German neurologist (b. 1876)
- April 7 – Shigeyoshi Matsuo, Japanese businessman (b. 1843)
- April 11 – Richard Harding Davis, American journalist and author (b. 1864)
- April 14 – Gina Krog, Norwegian suffragist, activist and editor (b. 1847)
- April 16 – Alexander Meyrick Broadley, British barrister (b. 1846)
- April 19
  - Colmar Freiherr von der Goltz, Prussian-born German field marshal and military writer (b. 1843)
  - Ephraim Shay, American inventor (b. 1839)
- April 21
  - Ubaldo Pacchierotti, Italian composer (b. 1876)
  - John Surratt, suspected of involvement in the Abraham Lincoln assassination, son of Mary Surratt (b. 1844)
- April 27 – Prince Leopold Clement of Saxe-Coburg and Gotha (b. 1878)
- April 28 – Edward Felix Baxter, English recipient of the Victorian Cross (b. 1885)

=== May ===
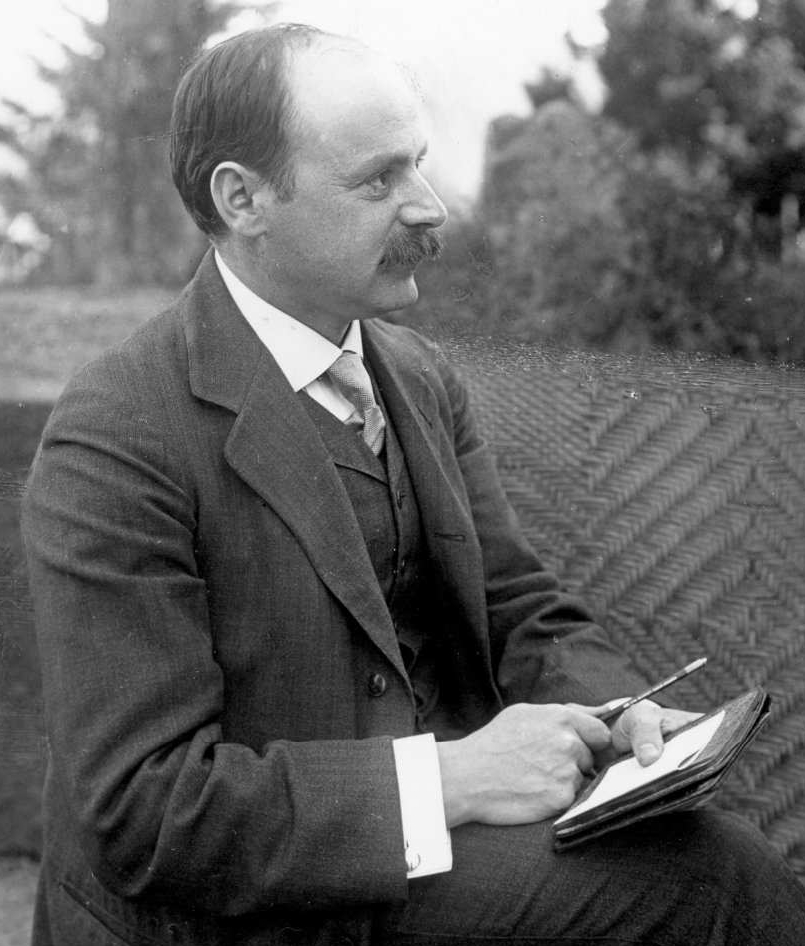
Karl Schwarzschild

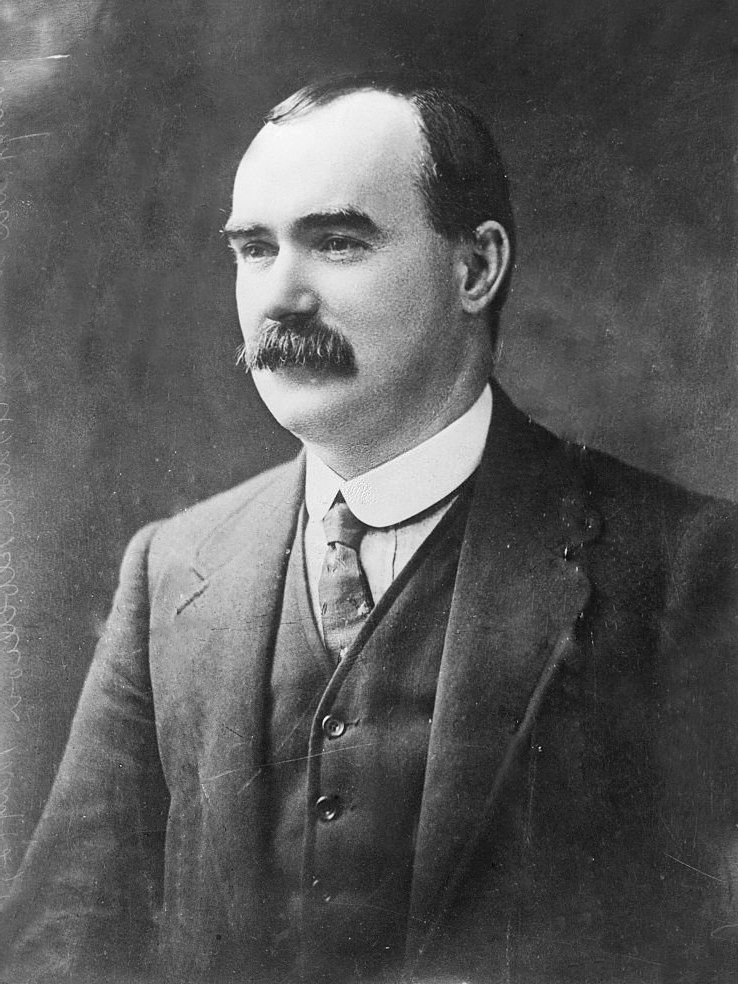
James Connolly

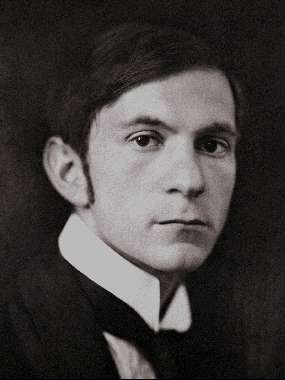
Vladimír Jindřich Bufka

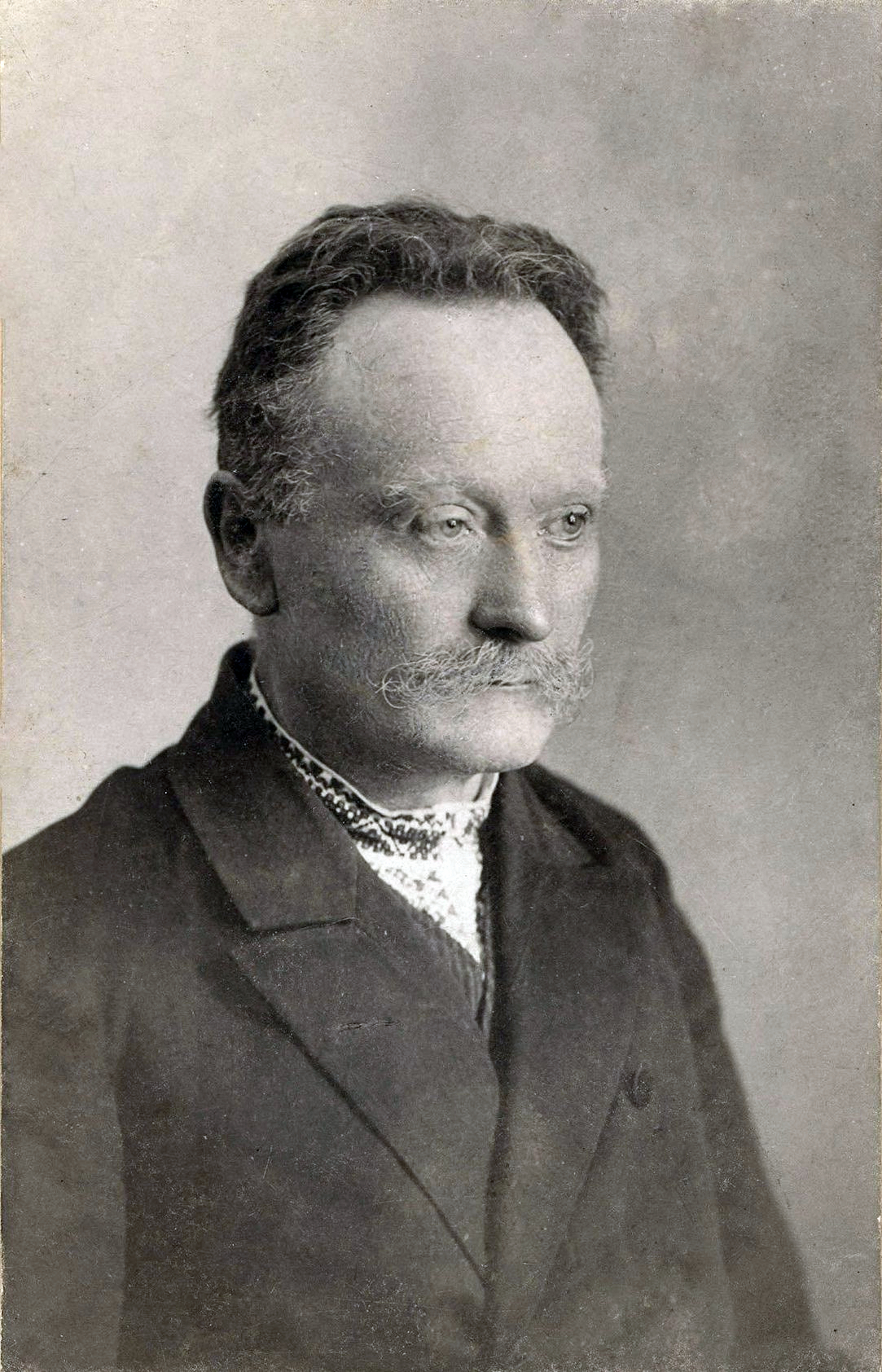
Ivan Franko

- May 2 – Jules Blanchard, French sculptor (b. 1832)
- May 3
  - Patrick Pearse, Irish teacher, barrister, poet, writer, political activist, and nationalist (executed) (b. 1879)
  - Thomas MacDonagh, Irish poet, playwright, educationalist and revolutionary leader (executed) (b. 1878)
  - Tom Clarke, Irish republican, leader of the Irish Republican Brotherhood (executed) (b. 1858)
- May 4
  - Lord John Hay, British admiral and politician (b. 1827)
  - Joseph Plunkett, Irish nationalist, republican, poet, journalist, revolutionary (executed) (b. 1887)
  - Hector Sévin, Italian Roman Catholic cardinal (b. 1852)
- May 6 – Hans Chiari, Austrian pathologist (b. 1851)
- May 8
  - Mabel Beardsley, English actress (b. 1871)
  - William Burnyeat, British politician (b. 1837)
  - Éamonn Ceannt, Irish republican (executed) (b. 1881)
  - Seán Heuston, Irish republican (executed) (b. 1891)
  - Aeneas Mackintosh, British Merchant Navy officer and Antarctic explorer (b. 1879)
  - Victor Hayward, British explorer (b. 1887)
- May 11
  - Max Reger, German modernist composer (b. 1873)
  - Karl Schwarzschild, German physicist (b. 1873)
  - Tirésias Simon Sam, 16th President of Haiti (b. 1835)
- May 12
  - James Connolly, Irish socialist and political activist (executed) (b. 1868)
  - Seán Mac Diarmada, Irish republican (executed) (b. 1883)
- May 13
  - Sholem Aleichem, Ukrainian Yiddish writer (b. 1859)
  - Ján Bahýľ, Slovak engineer and inventor (b. 1856)
  - Margaret Benson, English author (b. 1865)
  - Émile Petitot, French Roman Catholic missionary (b. 1838)
- May 18 – Chen Qiemi, Chinese politician (b. 1878)
- May 19 – Georges Boillot, French Grand Prix driver (killed in action) (b. 1884)
- May 21 – Artúr Görgei, Hungarian military general and politician (b. 1818)
- May 23 – Vladimír Jindřich Bufka, Czechoslovak photographer (b. 1887)
- May 27 – Joseph Gallieni, French general (b. 1849)
- May 28 – Ivan Franko, Ukrainian writer and political activist (b. 1856)
- May 31
  - Robert Arbuthnot, British admiral (killed in action) (b. 1864)
  - Sir Horace Hood, British admiral (killed in action) (b. 1870)

=== June ===
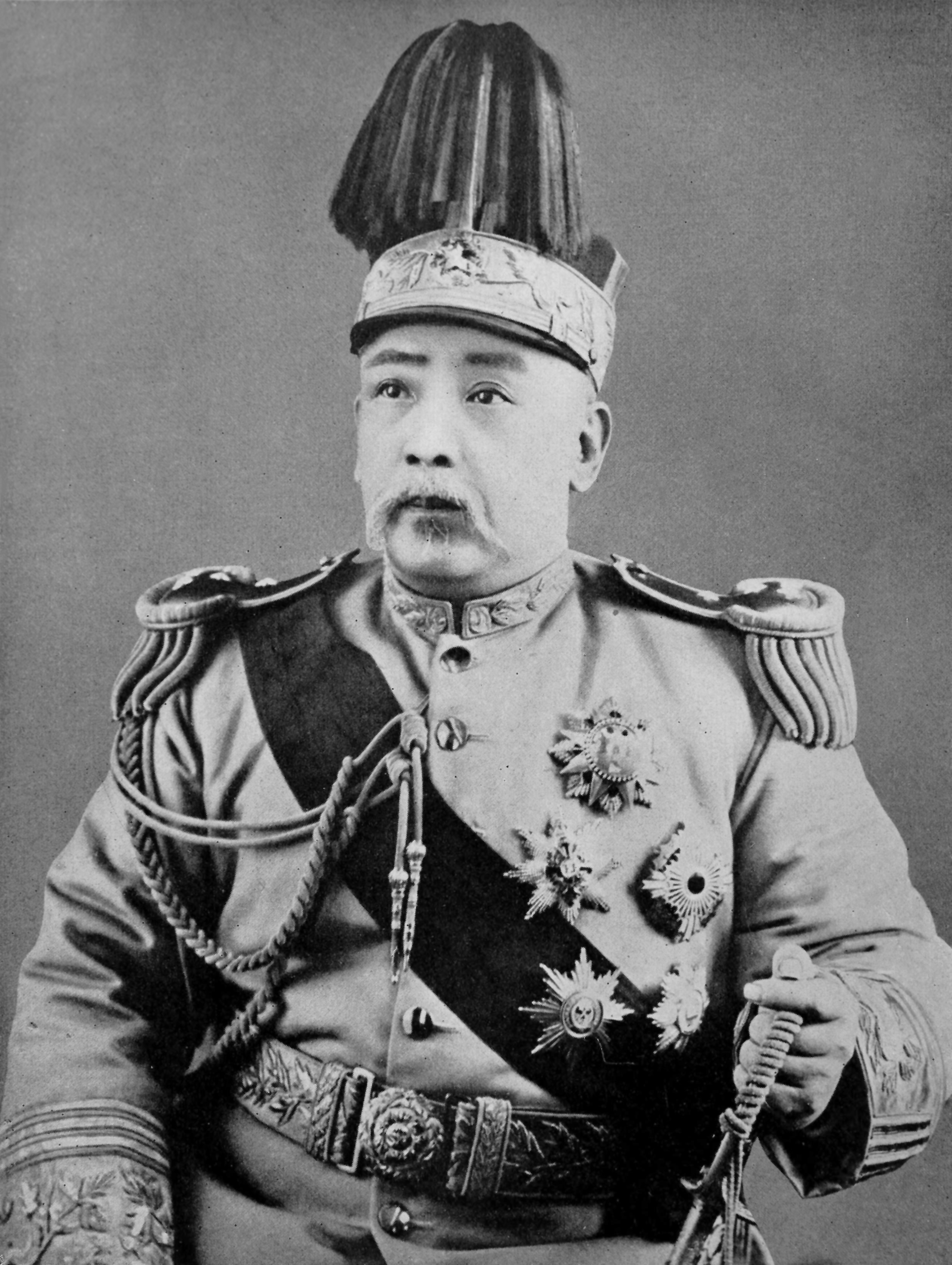
Yuan Shikai

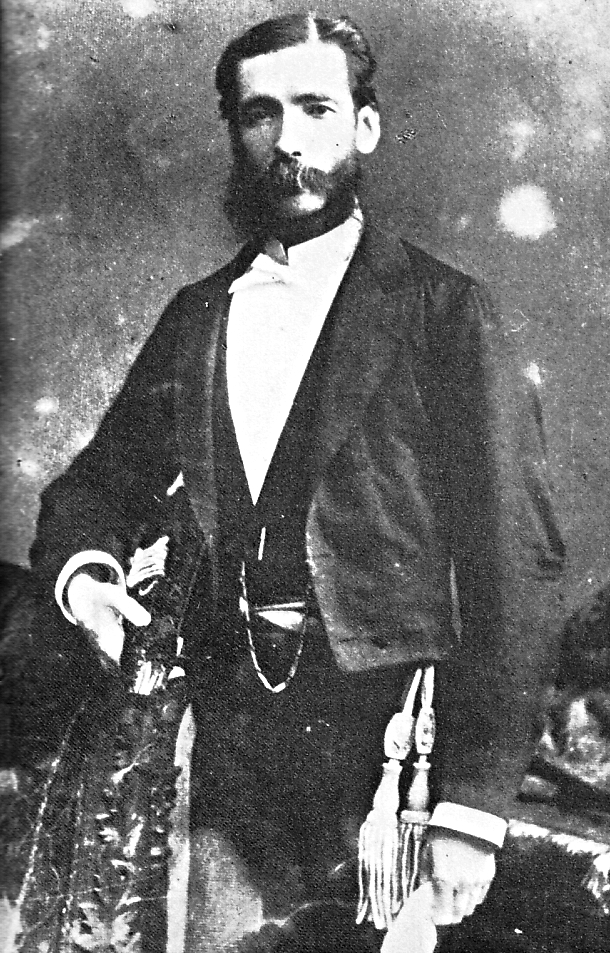
Alberto Elmore Fernández de Córdoba

- June 2 – Paul von Bruns, German surgeon (b. 1846)
- June 5 – Herbert Kitchener, 1st Earl Kitchener, British field marshal and statesman (drowned) (b. 1850)
- June 6 – Yuan Shikai, Chinese military official and politician, Emperor of China and 1st President of the Republic of China (b. 1859)
- June 7
  - Alberto Elmore Fernández de Córdoba, Peruvian diplomat and politician, 52nd Prime Minister of Peru (b. 1844)
  - Émile Faguet, French writer and critic (b. 1847)
- June 12 – Silvanus P. Thompson, English professor of physics, electrical engineer, member of the Royal Society and author (b. 1851)
- June 17 – Edwin Munroe Bacon, English writer (b. 1844)
- June 18
  - Max Immelmann, German fighter ace (killed in action) (b. 1890)
  - Helmuth von Moltke the Younger, German general (b. 1848)
- June 22 – Tanaka Yoshio, Japanese naturalist (b. 1838)
- June 24 – Victor Chapman, French-born American fighter pilot (killed in action) (b. 1890)
- June 25 – Thomas Eakins, American realist painter (b. 1844)
- June 30
  - Russell Barton, British-born Australian politician (b. 1830)
  - Eunice Eloisae Gibbs Allyn, American correspondent, author, and songwriter (b. 1847)

=== July ===
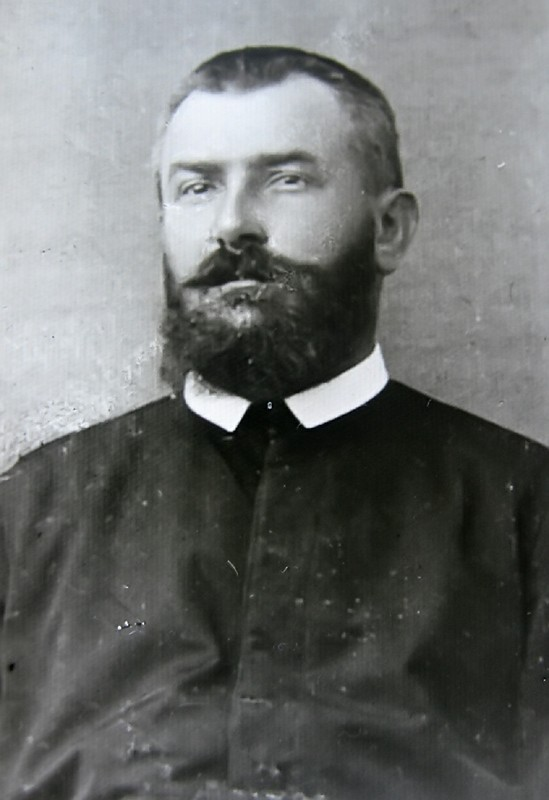
Servant of God Jeremiah Lomnytskyj

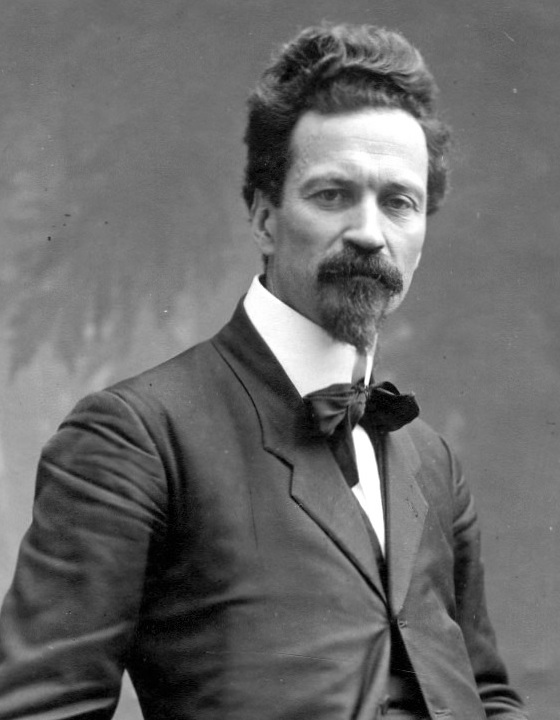
Cesare Battisti

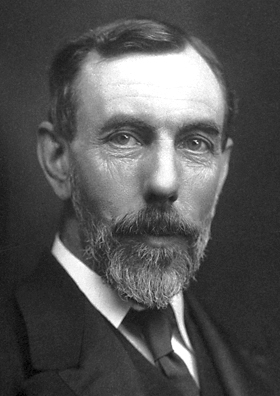
William Ramsay

- July 1 – First Day on the Somme (killed in action)
  - Eugene Bourdon, French architect (b. 1870)
  - Gilbert Waterhouse, English architect and war poet (b. 1883)
- July 2 – Mikhail Pomortsev, Russian meteorologist (b. 1851)
- July 3
  - Hetty Green, American businesswoman (b. 1834)
  - Alfred Kleiner, Swiss physicist (b. 1849)
  - Jeremiah Lomnytskyj, Ukrainian Basilian priest, missionary and servant of God (b. 1860)
- July 6 – Odilon Redon, French painter (b. 1840)
- July 7 – Margarethe Hormuth-Kallmorgen, German painter (b. 1835)
- July 12 – Cesare Battisti, Italian patriot, geographer and politician (b. 1875)
- July 15 – Élie Metchnikoff, Russian microbiologist, recipient of the Nobel Prize in Physiology or Medicine (b. 1845)
- July 16
  - Regino Garcia, Filipino artist (b. 1840)
  - Sir Victor Horsley, English physician and surgeon (b. 1857)
- July 20 – Reinhard Sorge, German dramatist and poet (killed in action) (b. 1892)
- July 22 – James Whitcomb Riley, American poet (b. 1849)
- July 23 – Sir William Ramsay, British chemist, Nobel Prize laureate (b. 1852)
- July 26
  - Gustave Maria Blanche, French Roman Catholic priest and bishop (b. 1849)
  - Johannes Ranke, German physiologist (b. 1836)
- July 27
  - Arthur Winton Brown, New Zealand politician, Mayor of Wellington (b. 1856)
  - Charles Fryatt, British mariner (executed) (b. 1872)
- July 29 – Claude Castleton, Australian VC recipient (killed in action) (b. 1893)

=== August ===
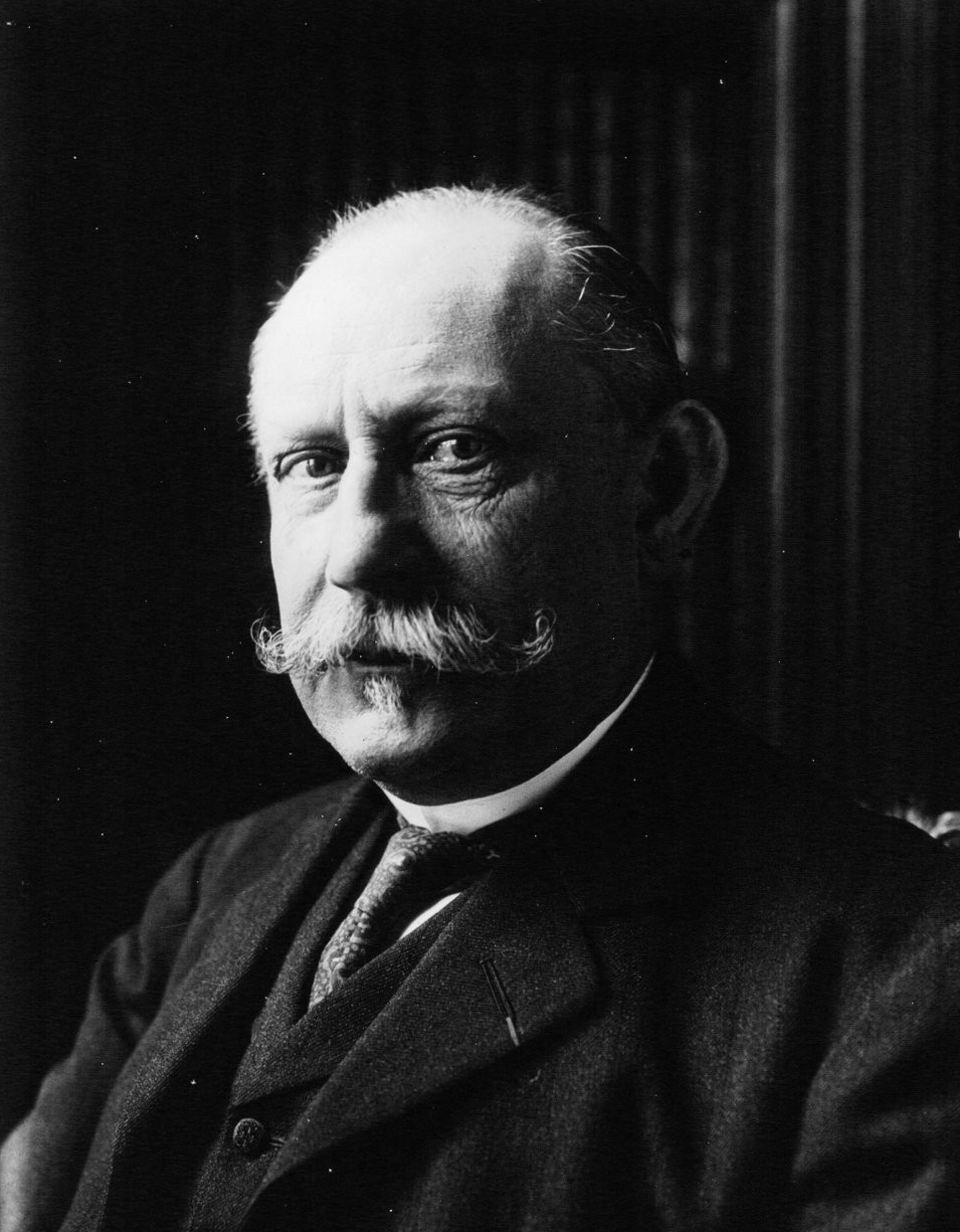
Pierre de Ségur

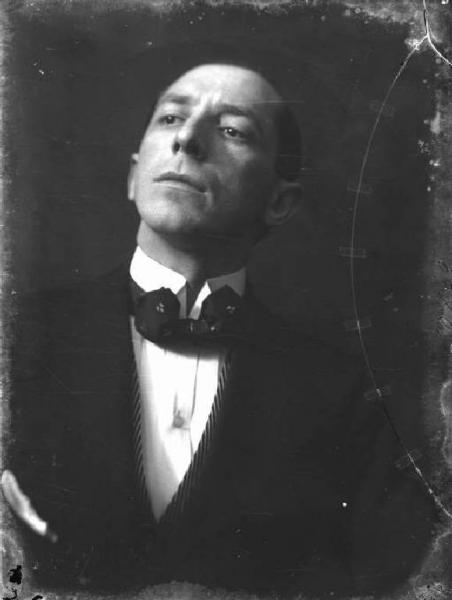
Umberto Boccioni

- August 3 – Roger Casement, Irish nationalist (executed) (b. 1864)
- August 5 – George Butterworth, English composer (b. 1885)
- August 7 – Kittredge Haskins, American lawyer and politician, U.S. House of Representatives from Vermont (b. 1836)
- August 8
  - Lily Braun, German writer (b. 1865)
  - Kamimura Hikonojō, Japanese admiral (b. 1849)
  - Oscar Linkson, English football player (b. 1888)
- August 9 – Guido Gozzano, Italian poet and writer (b. 1883)
- August 10 – S. Isadore Miner, American columnist writing as "Pauline Periwinkle" (b. 1863)
- August 13 – Pierre de Ségur, French historian (b. 1853)
- August 17 – Umberto Boccioni, Italian painter and sculptor (b. 1882)
- August 18 – Marcel Brindejonc des Moulinais, French aviator (b. 1892)
- August 30 – Alexander Boarman, American judge, U.S. House of Representatives of Louisiana (b. 1839)
- August 31
  - Martha McClellan Brown, American activist (b. 1838)
  - John St. John, American temperance leader and Governor of Kansas (b. 1833)

=== September ===
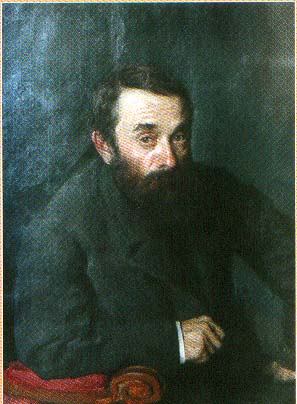
Gennady Ladyzhensky

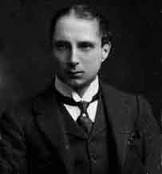
Gerald Arbuthnot

- September 2
  - Gennady Ladyzhensky, Russian painter (b. 1852)
  - Felipe Trigo, Spanish writer (b. 1864)
- September 7 – Annie Le Porte Diggs, Canadian-born American activist and librarian (b. 1853)
- September 8
  - Friedrich Baumfelder, German composer, conductor, and pianist (b. 1836)
  - James Gray, American journalist, 19th Mayor of Minneapolis (b. 1862)
- September 12 – Zygmunt Balicki, Polish sociologist (b. 1858)
- September 14
  - Pierre Duhem, French physicist (b. 1861)
  - José Echegaray, Spanish writer, Nobel Prize laureate (b. 1832)
- September 15
  - Raymond Asquith, English barrister (b. 1878)
  - Josiah Royce, American philosopher (b. 1855)
- September 17 – Seth Low, American politician and educator, Mayor of New York City (b. 1850)
- September 25
  - Gerald Arbuthnot, British soldier and politician (b. 1872)
  - Arthur Herbert Thompson, English soldier and football player (b. 1890)
  - Kurt Wintgens, German fighter pilot, air ace in World War I (b. 1894)
- September 29 – Albert John Cook, American entomologist and zoologist (b. 1842)

=== October ===
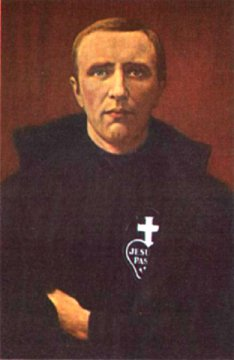
Blessed Isidore De Loor

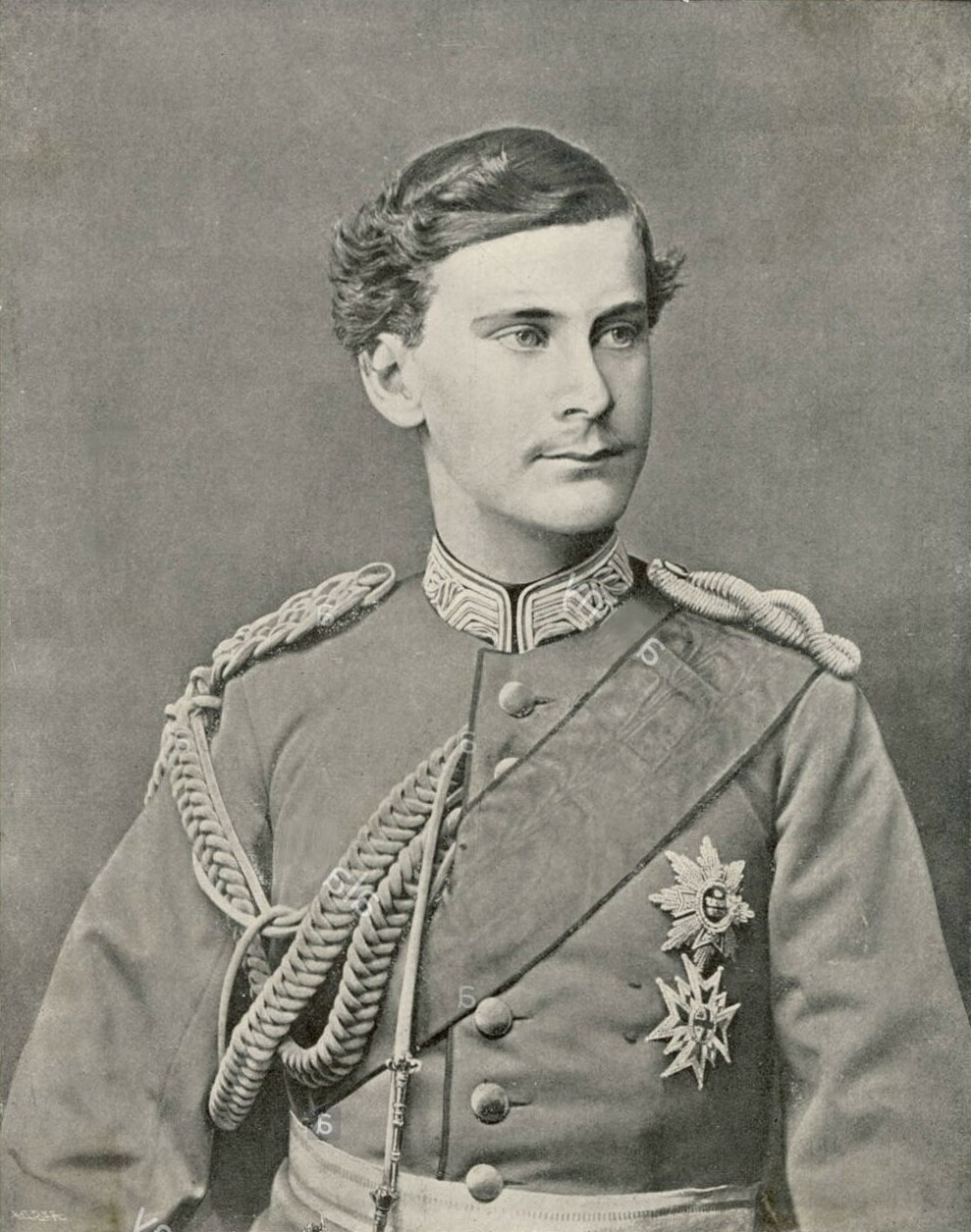
King Otto of Bavaria

- October 3
  - James Burgess, British archaeologist (b. 1832)
  - Dmytro Yaremko, Ukrainian Eastern Catholic hierarch and bishop (b. 1879)
- October 6 – Isidore De Loor, Belgian Roman Catholic religious professed and blessed (b. 1881)
- October 10 – Antonio Sant'Elia, Italian architect (killed in action) (b. 1888)
- October 11 – King Otto of Bavaria (b. 1848)
- October 12 – Tony Jannus, American aviator and aircraft designer (b. 1889)
- October 18 – Ignacio Pinazo Camarlench, Spanish painter (b. 1849)
- October 21
  - Olindo Guerrini, Italian poet (b. 1845)
  - Karl von Stürgkh, Prime Minister of Austria (b. 1859)
- October 25 – Gérard Encausse, Papus, French occultist (b. 1865)
- October 28
  - Oswald Boelcke, German World War I fighter ace, (b. 1891)
  - Cleveland Abbe, American meteorologist (b. 1838)
- October 29 – John Sebastian Little, American politician and congressman (b. 1851)
- October 31
  - Tina Blau, Austrian painter (b. 1845)
  - Charles Taze Russell, Protestant evangelist, forerunner of Jehovah's Witnesses (b. 1852)
  - Huang Xing, Chinese revolutionary leader and politician, and the first commander-in-chief of the Republic of China (b. 1874)

=== November ===
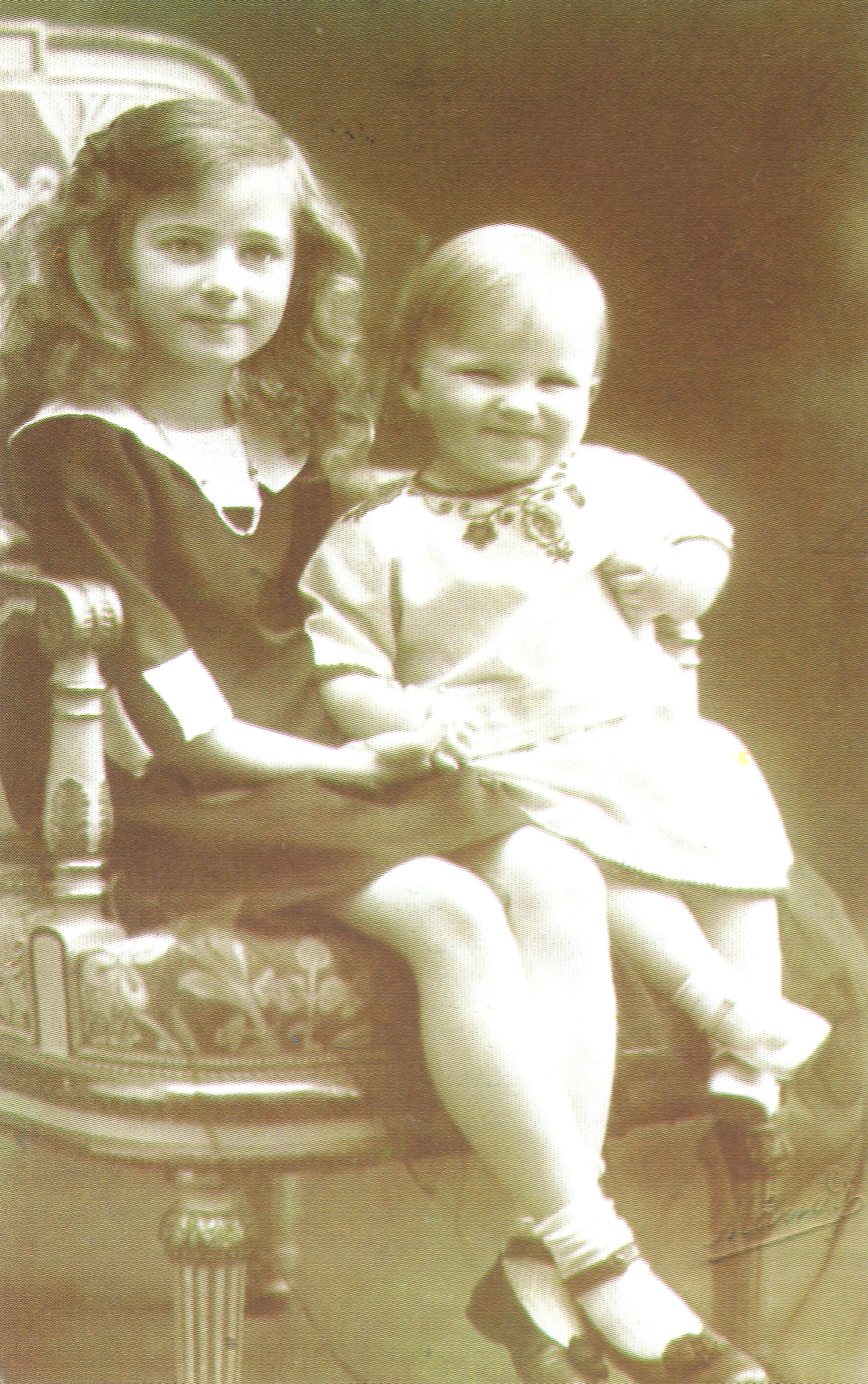
Prince Mircea of Romania

Prince Heinrich of Bavaria

Francisco da Veiga Beirão

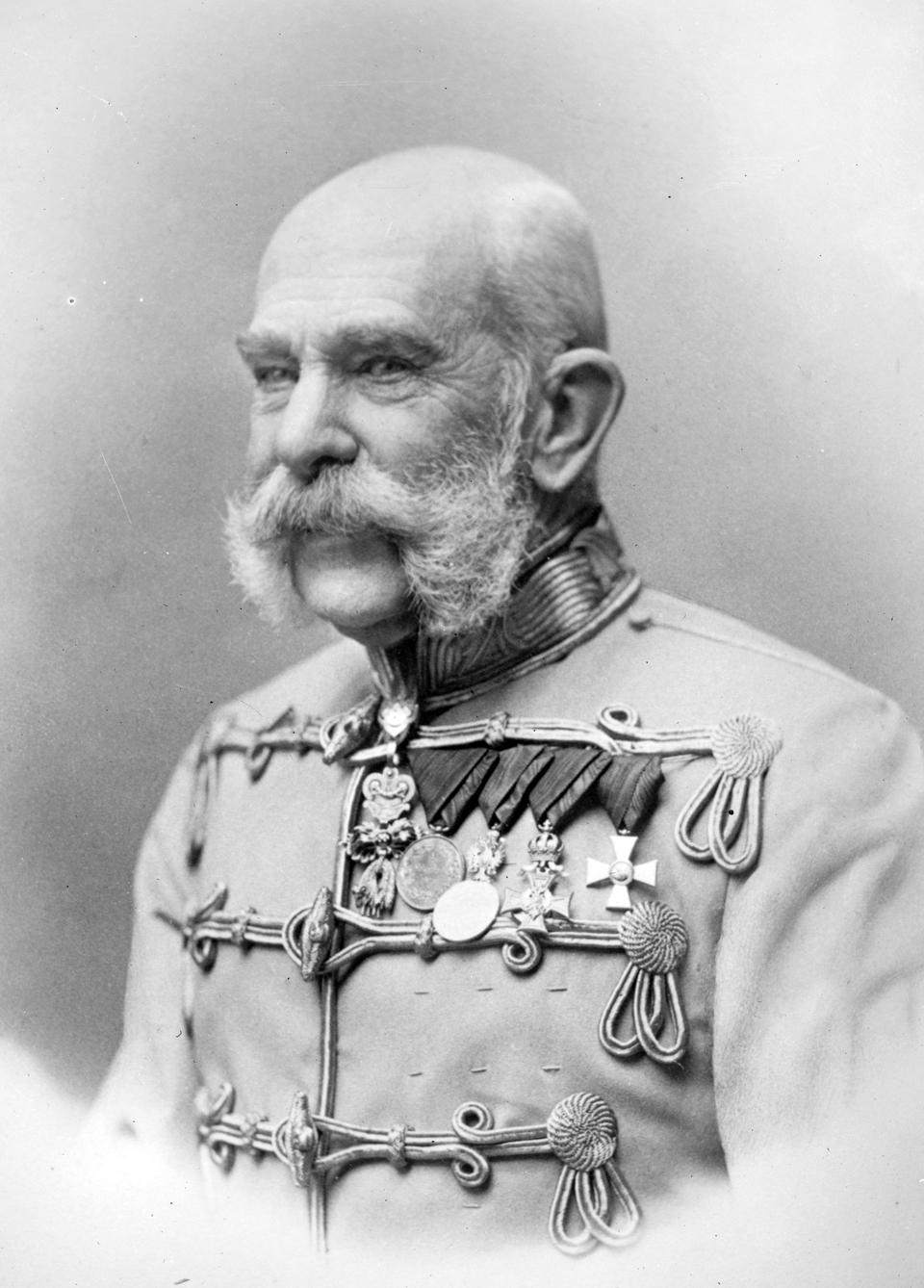
Emperor Franz Joseph I of Austria

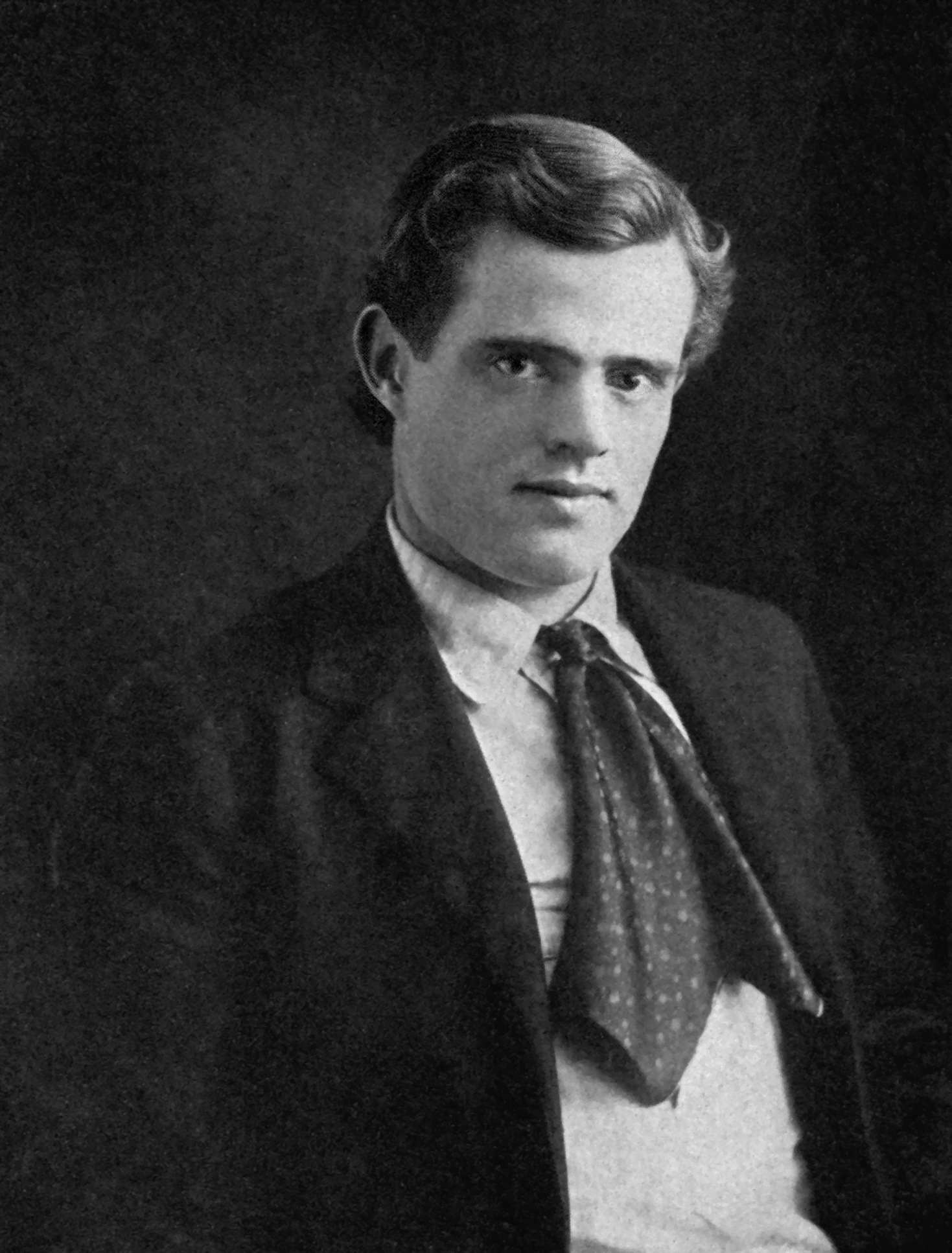
Jack London

- November 1 – Franz, Prince of Thun and Hohenstein, Austrian noble and statesman, Prime Minister (b. 1847)
- November 2 – Prince Mircea of Romania (b. 1913)
- November 3 – August Lindberg, Swedish actor, director and manager (b. 1846)
- November 4
  - John Bingham, 5th Baron Clanmorris, Irish peer (b. 1838)
  - Ella Loraine Dorsey, American author, journalist, and translator (b. 1853)
- November 5 – Francesco Salesio Della Volpe, Italian Roman Catholic cardinal (b. 1844)
- November 6 – Sultan Ali Dinar (b. 1856)
- November 8 – Prince Heinrich of Bavaria (b. 1884)
- November 9
  - Ludwig Bruns, German neurologist (b. 1856)
  - Ion Dragalina, Romanian general (died of wounds) (b. 1860)
- November 10 – Walter Sutton, American geneticist and physician (b. 1877)
- November 11
  - Frank Chesterton, British architect (b. 1877)
  - Francisco da Veiga Beirão, Portuguese politician, 53rd Prime Minister of Portugal (b. 1841)
- November 12 – Percival Lowell, American astronomer (b. 1855)
- November 14
  - Franklin Ware Mann, American inventor (b. 1856)
  - Saki, British writer (b. 1870)
- November 15 – Henryk Sienkiewicz, Polish writer, Nobel Prize laureate (b. 1846)
- November 18 – August Lindberg, Swedish actor, director and manager (b. 1846)
- November 21 –
  - Chester Adgate Congdon, American mining magnate (b. 1853)
  - Emperor Franz Joseph I of Austria (b. 1830)
- November 22 – Jack London, American author (b. 1876)
- November 23 – Lanoe Hawker VC, British World War I fighter ace, killed in action by Manfred von Richthofen (b. 1890)
- November 24
  - Princess Adelheid-Marie of Anhalt-Dessau (b. 1833)
  - John Francis Barnett, English teacher (b. 1851)
  - Sir Hiram Maxim, American firearms inventor (b. 1840)
- November 25 – Inez Milholland, American suffragist, labor lawyer, World War I correspondent and public speaker (b. 1886)
- November 27 – Émile Verhaeren, Belgian poet (b. 1855)
- November 28 – Martinus Theunis Steyn, Boer lawyer, politician, and statesman, sixth and last President of the Orange Free State (1896–1902) (b. 1857)
- November 30 – Demetrio Alonso Castrillo, Spanish politician (b. 1841)

=== December ===
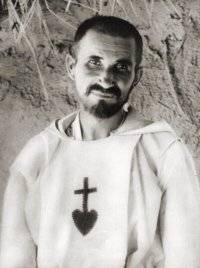
Blessed Charles de Foucauld

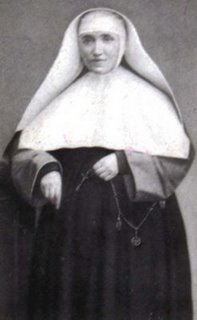
Blessed Giulia Valle

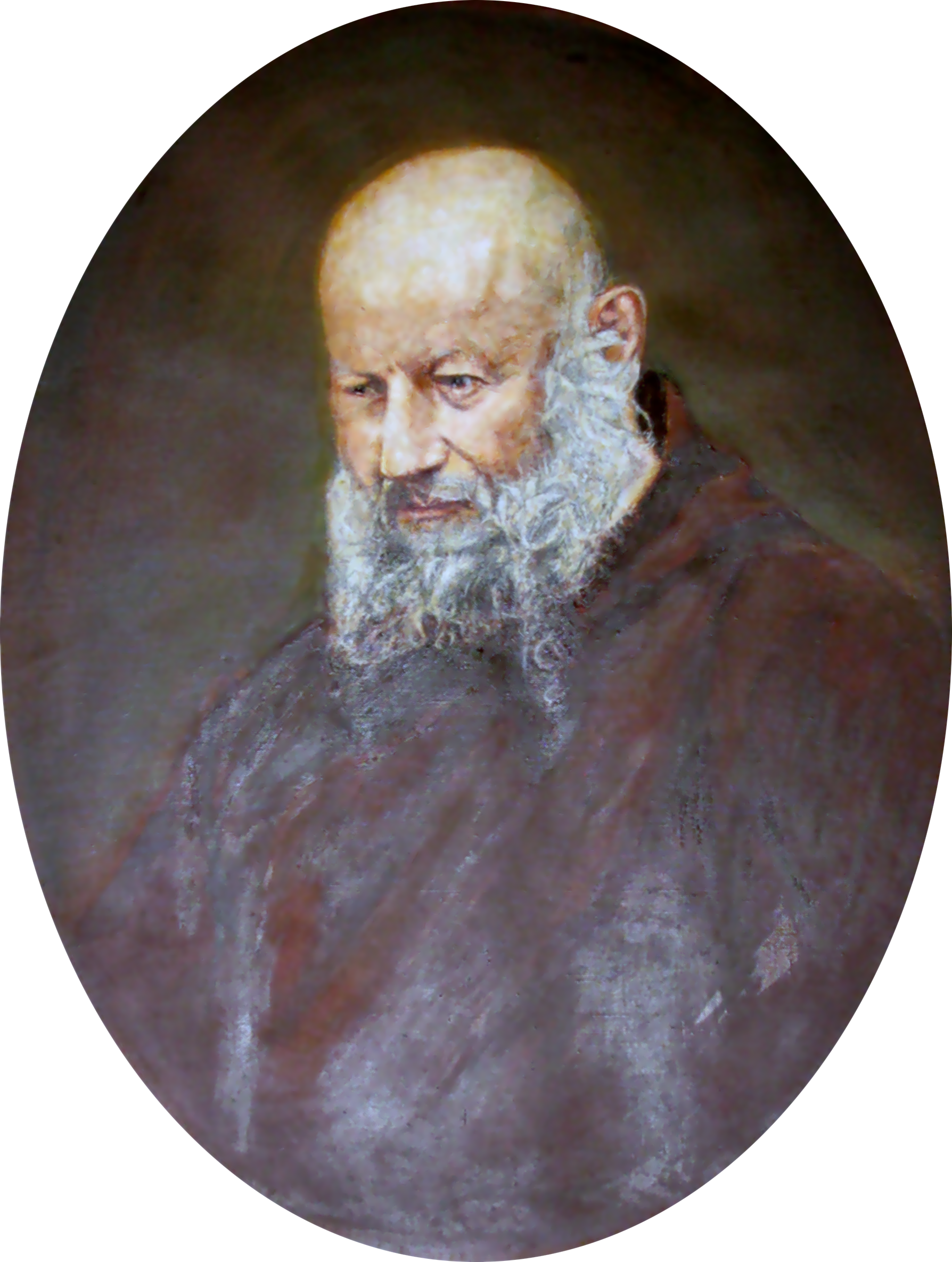
Blessed Honorat da Biała

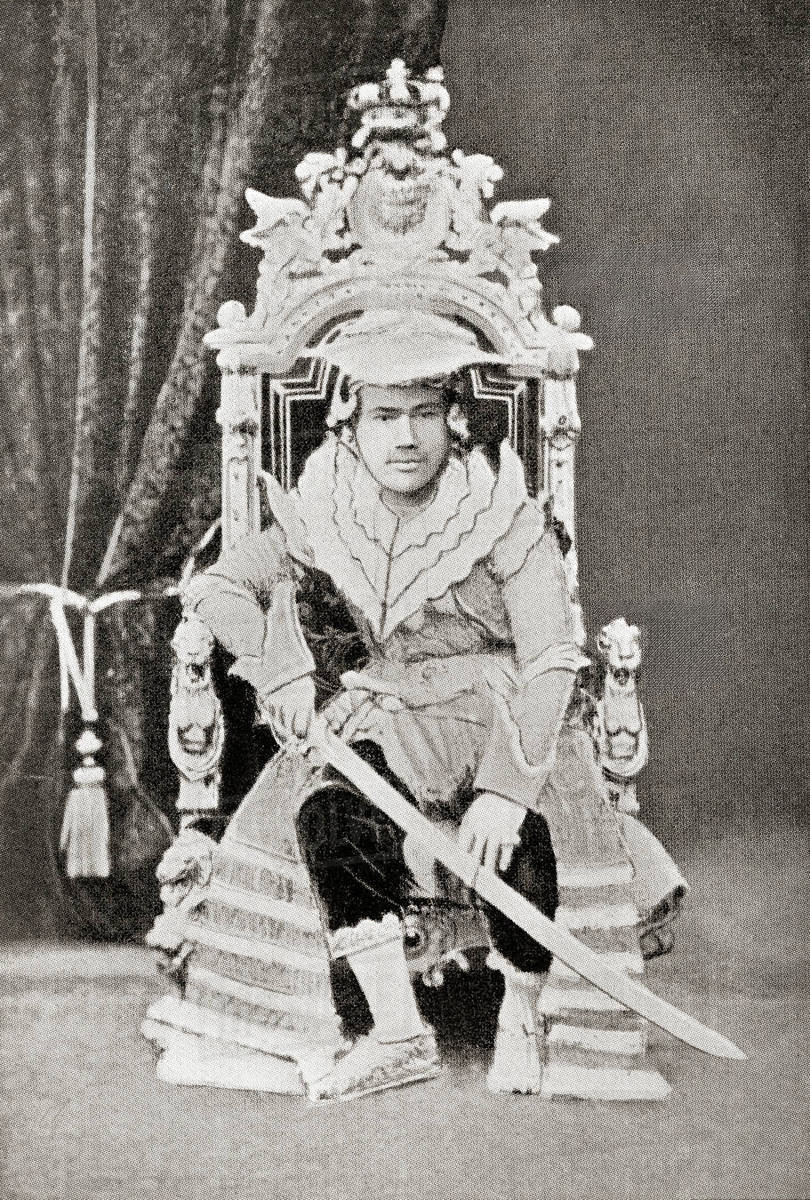
King Thibaw Min

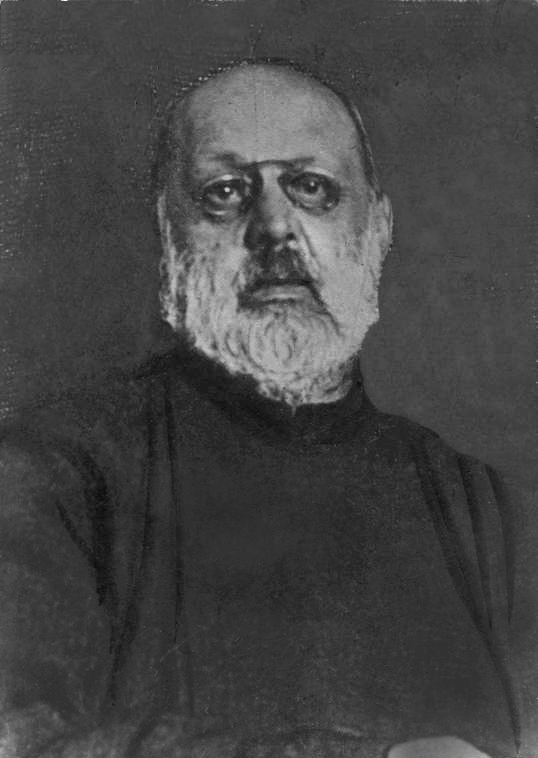
Saint Albert Chmielowski

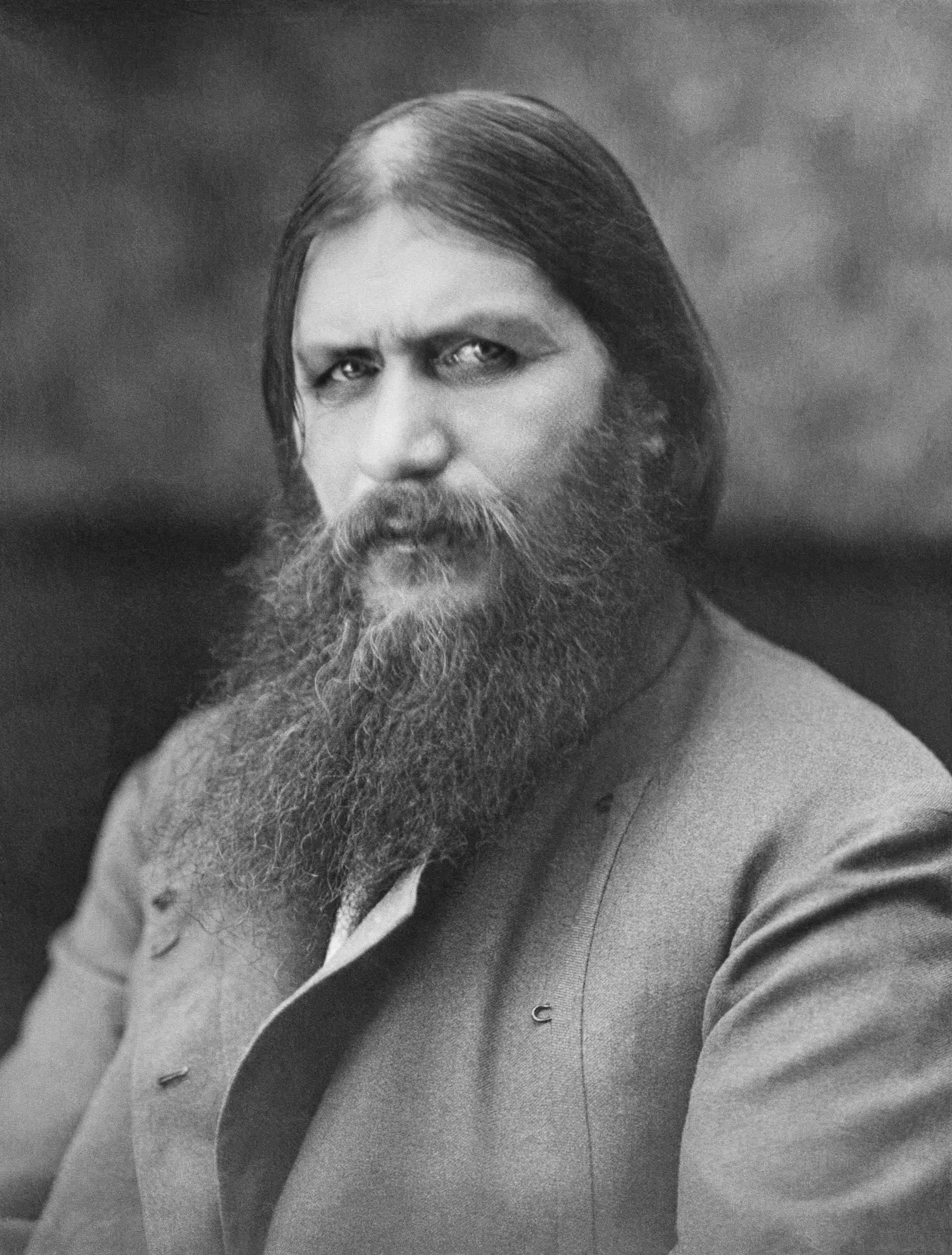
Grigori Rasputin

- December 1 – Charles de Foucauld, French Roman Catholic religious professed, priest and blessed (b. 1858)
- December 2
  - William Brownell, Australian politician (b. 1862)
  - Hughie Hughes, British racecar driver (b. 1885)
  - José Veríssimo, Brazilian writer (b. 1857)
- December 4 – Paul Allard, French archaeologist and historian (b. 1841)
- December 5
  - Princess Augusta of Cambridge (b. 1822)
  - Hans Richter, Austrian–Hungarian conductor (b. 1843)
- December 6 – Signe Hornborg, Finnish architect (b. 1856)
- December 8 – John Porter Merrell, American admiral (b. 1846)
- December 9
  - Pierre Paul Leroy-Beaulieu, French economist (b. 1843)
  - Natsume Sōseki, Japanese writer (b. 1867)
  - Clara Ward, Princesse de Caraman-Chimay (b. 1873)
- December 10 – Ōyama Iwao, Japanese field marshal and a founder of the Imperial Japanese Army (b. 1842)
- December 11
  - Valentín Díaz, Filipino patriot, during the Philippine Revolution (b. 1845)
  - Zoilo H. Garcia, Dominican engineer and aviator (b. 1881)
- December 12 – Edwin Atlee Barber, American archaeologist (b. 1851)
- December 14 – Nicolai Soloviev, Russian composer (b. 1846)
- December 15 – José Maria de Alpoim, Portuguese journalist (b. 1857)
- December 16
  - Friedrich Ernst Dorn, German physicist (b. 1848)
  - Honorat da Biała, Polish Roman Catholic priest and blessed (b. 1829)
  - Hugo Münsterberg, German-born American psychologist (b. 1856)
  - Ognjeslav Stepanović, Serbian inventor (b. 1851)
- December 18
  - George W. Cook, U.S. Representative from Colorado (b. 1851)
  - Giulia Valle, Italian Roman Catholic nun and blessed (b. 1847)
- December 19
  - Doug Allison, American baseball player (b. 1846)
  - Thibaw Min, King of Burma (b. 1859)
- December 22 – George A. Woodward, American general (b. 1835)
- December 25
  - Albert Chmielowski, Polish Roman Catholic religious professed and saint (b. 1845)
  - John Dunne, Australian Roman Catholic bishop and reverend (b. 1846)
- December 28 – Eduard Strauss, Austrian composer (b. 1835)
- December 30
  - Grigori Rasputin, Russian mystic (assassinated) (b. 1869)
  - Leopold Sulerzhitsky, Russian painter (b. 1872)

== Nobel Prizes ==

- Physics – not awarded
- Chemistry – not awarded
- Medicine – not awarded
- Literature – Carl Gustaf Verner von Heidenstam
- Peace – not awarded
