= May 1916 =

Month in 1916

<<	May 1916					>>
Su	Mo	Tu	We	Th	Fr	Sa
	1	2	3	4	5	6
7	8	9	10	11	12	13
14	15	16	17	18	19	20
21	22	23	24	25	26	27
28	29	30	31

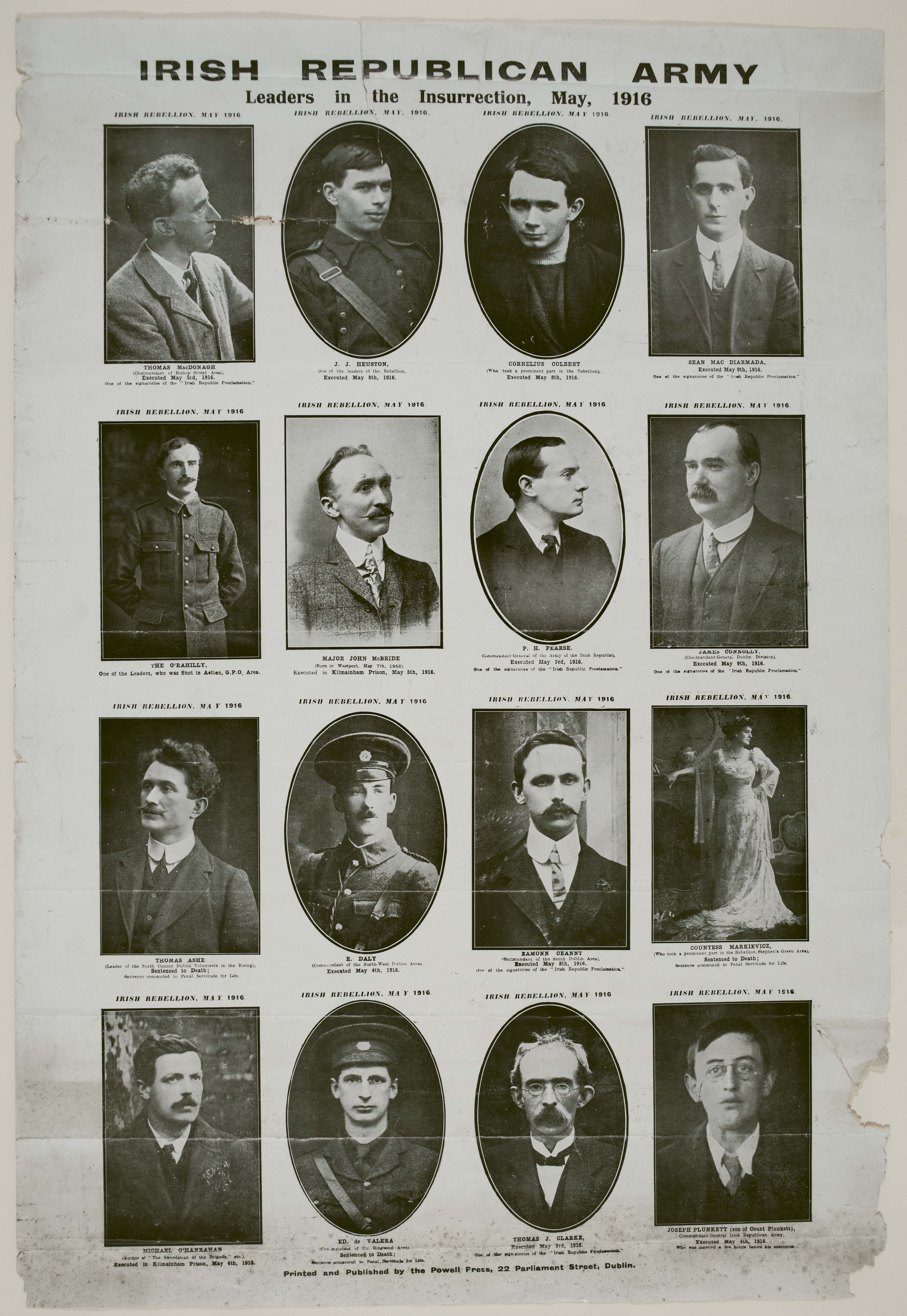
Poster of leaders of the Easter Rising in Dublin, many of whom were arrested and later executed by British authorities.

The following events occurred in May 1916:

== May 1, 1916 (Monday) ==
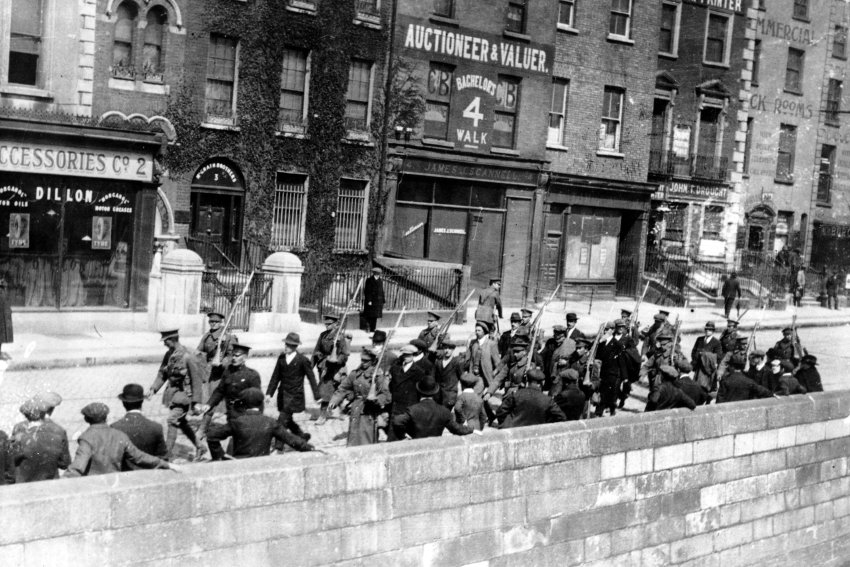
Members of the Easter Rising in Dublin surrendering to the British Army.

- Easter Rising – The Irish uprising against British authority came to an end after Major-General John Maxwell, commander of the British forces in Dublin, announced all members of the insurrection had surrendered. The insurrection caused a total 485 deaths, more than half of them civilians, and another 2,600 wounded due to British shelling or cross-fire.
- Augustine Birrell resigned from the British government as Chief Secretary for Ireland after being historically proven wrong that there was no threat of insurrection in Ireland.
- General Robert Nivelle took command of the French Second Army during the Battle of Verdun.
- Oil tycoon Harry Ford Sinclair formed the Sinclair Oil Corporation in Salt Lake City.
- Norwegian transit company A/S Trikken began managing the trolleybus system of Norway, and would continue to do so until 1947.
- The Rhodesian African Rifles were established.
- Born:
  - Glenn Ford, Canadian-born American actor, known for his lead film roles in The Big Heat, Blackboard Jungle and 3:10 to Yuma; as Gwyllyn Samuel Newton Ford, in Quebec City, Canada (d. 2006)
  - Rong Yiren, Chinese state leader, Vice President of the People's Republic of China from 1993 to 1998; in Wuxi, Republic of China (present-day China) (d. 2005)
  - Victor Starffin, Russian baseball player, pitcher for Tokyo Kyojingun and other Japanese baseball teams from 1934 to 1955; as Viktor Starukhin, in Nizhny Tagil, Russian Empire (present-day Russia) (d. 1957)
- Died: William Foulke, 42, English association football player, goalkeeper for Sheffield from 1894 to 1905 and member of the England national football team in 1897; died of cirrhosis (b. 1874)

== May 2, 1916 (Tuesday) ==
- Easter Rising – A series of courts-martial began against 187 Irish citizens charged for their role in the insurrection under the oversight of Major-General Charles Blackader. Most were conducted secretly at British barracks, with the accused having no access to defense. Ninety were sentenced to death, including all seven signatories of the Proclamation of the Irish Republic. Many of the courts-martial were later ruled by British Crown law officers as illegal.
- Eight German Zeppelins raided the east coast of England, causing 39 casualties, but LZ 59 (L 20) was wrecked in a storm off Stavanger, Norway on the return journey.

== May 3, 1916 (Wednesday) ==
- Easter Rising – Following their courts martial, Irish Republican leaders Patrick Pearse, Thomas MacDonagh and Tom Clarke were executed at Kilmainham Gaol.
- The Brazilian Academy of Sciences was established in Rio de Janeiro.
- Born: Henry B. González, American politician, U.S. Representative from Texas from 1961 to 1999; as Enrique Barbosa González, in San Antonio, United States (d. 2000)

== May 4, 1916 (Thursday) ==
- Battle of Verdun – Germany launched localized attacks from French forces from Cumières-le-Mort-Homme, France in retaliation to French counterattacks in April.
- Easter Rising – Execution of Irish leaders involved in the uprising continued with Joseph Plunkett, Michael O'Hanrahan, Edward Daly and Willie Pearse.
- Born:
  - Li Desheng, Chinese army officer, general for the People's Liberation Army and its director from 1969 to 1975; in Xin County, Henan, Republic of China (present-day China) (d. 2011)
  - Jane Jacobs, American-Canadian journalist and activist, leading expert on urban studies, author of The Death and Life of Great American Cities and Systems of Survival; as Jane Isabel Butzner, in Scranton, Pennsylvania, United States (d. 2006)
  - Richard Proenneke, American naturalist, survived thirty years alone at Twin Lakes, Alaska, covered in print as One Man's Wilderness: An Alaskan Odyssey and the documentary Alone in the Wilderness; in Lee County, Iowa, United States (d. 2003)
  - Alexander Ratiu, Romanian-American clergy, arrested for his ministry work for the Romanian Catholic Eparchy of Oradea Mare in Romania and imprisoned from 1948 to 1964; in Scalp Level, Pennsylvania, United States (d. 2002)
- Died:
  - Lord John Hay, 88, British naval officer, noted naval commander during the Crimean War and First and Second Opium War (b. 1827)
  - John Murray, 64, Australian politician, 23rd Premier of Victoria, Australia (b. 1851)

== May 5, 1916 (Friday) ==
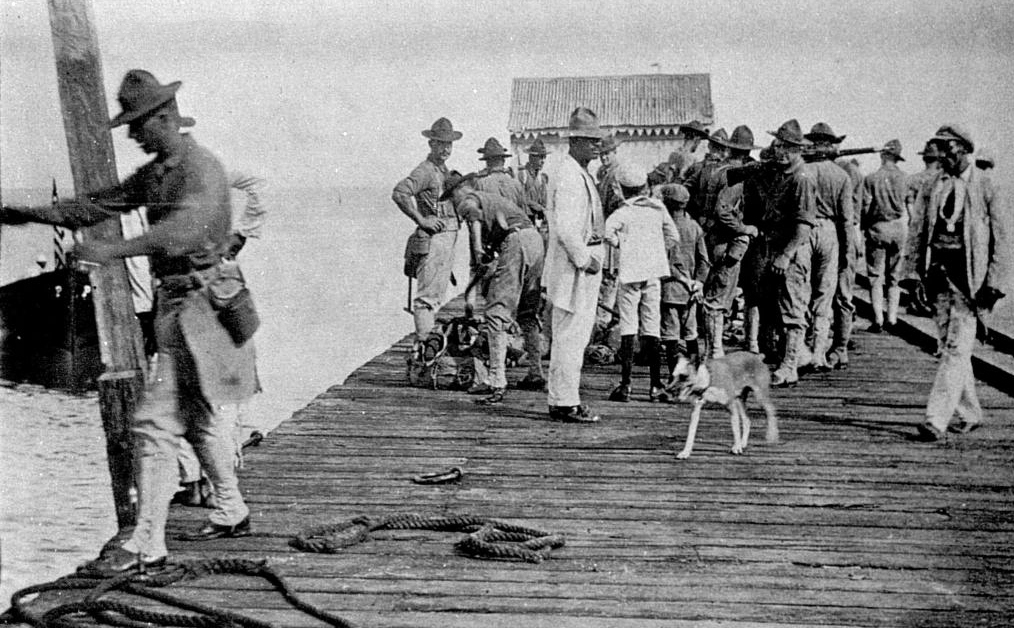
U.S. Marines landing at Santo Domingo, Dominican Republic.

- Battle of Verdun – French counterattacks failed to stem the German advance from Cumières-le-Mort-Homme, France.
- Two companies of U.S. Marines from the USS Prairie landed at Santo Domingo, Dominican Republic, beginning eight years of U.S. occupation in the Caribbean nation.
- Anglo-Egyptian Darfur Expedition – A Sudanese force of 500 men loyal to Sultan Ali Dinar of the Sultanate of Darfur (now Sudan) attacked an Anglo-Egyptian garrison stationed at Abiad in an attempt to drive the colonial force out of the region.
- Raid on Glenn Springs – A raiding party of 80 Pancho Villa loyalists surprised nine U.S. Cavalry men posted at Glenn Springs, Texas. The Americans holed up in an adobe building and held off the fighters for three hours before attempting to escape on their horses. Three cavalrymen were killed along with a civilian and two were taken prisoner, leaving three to make it out and report the raid to U.S. authorities.
- Voyage of the James Caird – A massive wave nearly swamped the lifeboat British polar explorer Ernest Shackleton and five companions remodeled for an (800 nautical miles (1,500 km; 920 mi)) open boat journey from Elephant Island in the South Shetland Islands to South Georgia in the southern Atlantic Ocean in their attempt to obtain rescue for the main body of the Imperial Trans-Antarctic Expedition following the loss of its ship Endurance in November.
- Easter Rising – Irish leader John MacBride was executed but compatriot W. T. Cosgrave had his sentence commuted to life imprisonment.
- The Royal Flying Corps established the No. 54 Squadron.
- The Conference Board was established in Bronxville, New York, with Magnus W. Alexander as president, to address growing labor unrest in the United States.
- Born:
  - Zail Singh, Indian state leader, 7th President of India; as Jarnail Singh, in Sandhwan, Punjab, British India (present-day India) (killed in an auto accident, 1994)
  - P. U. Chinnappa, Indian singer and actor, best known for his 1940s roles in Uthama Puthiran, Aryamala, Kannagi, and Jagathalapratapan; as Pudukottai Ulaganathan Chinnaswamy Pillai, in Pudukkottai State, British India (present-day India) (d. 1951)
  - Doris Lusk, New Zealand artist, best known for painting and pottery work including Landscape, Overlooking Kaitawa, Waikaremoana; in Dunedin, New Zealand (d. 1990)

== May 6, 1916 (Saturday) ==
- The Rome and Fiuggi Rail Road opened for service.
- The Sydney Conservatorium of Music accepted its first students under the direction of Belgian conductor and violinist Henri Verbrugghen.
- Natsume Sōseki's novel Light and Darkness began serialization in the Tokyo and Osaka editions of The Asahi Shimbun newspaper but would remain unfinished at the author's death on December 9.
- The Markham open coal mine pit near Doncaster, England began operations but stopped on August 24 due to wartime worker shortage. The mine resumed operations in 1922 until closing for good in 1996.
- Born:
  - Bobby Gibbes, Australian air force officer, commander of the No. 3 Squadron for the Royal Australian Air Force during World War II, recipient of the Distinguished Service Order and Distinguished Flying Cross; as Robert Henry Maxwell Gibbes, in Young, New South Wales, Australia (d. 2007)
  - Charles T. Horner Jr., American army officer, commander of the U.S. 1st Infantry Division during World War II, two-time recipient of the Distinguished Service Medal and the Distinguished Service Cross; in Doylestown, Pennsylvania, United States (d. 1992)
  - Adriana Caselotti, American singer and model, voice and model for Snow White in the Disney animated film Snow White and the Seven Dwarfs; in Bridgeport, Connecticut, United States (d. 1997)
  - Robert H. Dicke, American physicist, inventor of the lock-in amplifier and the microwave radiometer; in St. Louis, United States (d. 1997)
  - Freddie Steele, English association football player, forward for Stoke City and the England national football team from 1933 to 1953; as Frederick Charles Steele, in Hanley, Staffordshire, England (d. 1976)

== May 7, 1916 (Sunday) ==
- Battle of Kondoa Irangi – A South African force of 3,000 men under command of Jacob van Deventer defended the town of Kondoa Irangi in German East Africa against an attack of 4,000 German colonial troops under command of Paul von Lettow-Vorbeck.
- Battle of Verdun – Germans troops forced the French off Côte 304, a key hill on the Verdun line but failed to hold it due to artillery barrages.
- Juan Isidro Jimenes Pereyra resigned as President of the Dominican Republic as U.S. Marines began to occupy territory in the Caribbean country, allowing Secretary of War Desiderio Arias to take control of Dominican forces.
- The Government of Canada authorized the creation of an all-black battalion that became No. 2 Construction Battalion of the Canadian Expeditionary Force.
- Born:
  - Eric Butler, Australian political activist, founder of the Australian League of Rights; in Benalla, Victoria, Australia (d. 2006)
  - Henry V. Graham, American National Guard officer, commanded National Guard units to protect black activists during the civil rights movement; in Birmingham, Alabama, United States (d. 1999)
  - Huw Wheldon, Welsh media broadcaster, managing director of BBC from 1968 to 1975; in Prestatyn, Wales (d. 1986)

== May 8, 1916 (Monday) ==
- Voyage of the James Caird – The British relief crew led by Ernest Shackleton sighted South Georgia Island after a two-week open water crossing, allowing them a chance to get to civilization and seek help for the main body of the Imperial Trans-Antarctic Expedition stranded on Elephant Island.
- Easter Rising – Irish leaders Éamonn Ceannt, Con Colbert, Michael Mallin, Seán Heuston were all executed for their role in the insurrection.
- British steamship SS Cymric was torpedoed and sunk by German submarine SM U-20, killing five sailors.
- U.S. Army General Hugh L. Scott ordered an expedition into Mexico to rescue the two prisoners captured by militia loyal to Pancho Villa during the Glenn Springs raid.
- Ross Sea party – Expedition leader Aeneas Mackintosh of the second arm of the Imperial Trans-Antarctic Expedition and fellow party member Victor Hayward disappeared in a blizzard while searching for a path over the thin ice in the Ross Sea to Cape Evans where the rest of the expedition was stationed. Expedition members Ernest Wild, brother to Frank Wild of the expedition party under Ernest Shackleton, Ernest Joyce and Richard W. Richards followed the pair's tracks after the storm and found them ending at broken ice, leading them to conclude the two fell through into the water and drowned.
- Born:
  - João Havelange, Brazilian sports executive, 7th and longest-serving President of FIFA; as Jean-Marie Faustin Godefroid de Havelange, in Rio de Janeiro, Brazil (d. 2016)
  - John Mariucci, American hockey player, played defence for the Chicago Blackhawks and St. Louis Flyers from 1940 to 1952, first assistant coach for the Minnesota North Stars; in Eveleth, Minnesota, United States (d. 1987)
  - Sylvia Sleigh, Welsh-born American artist, best known for her realist revisions of classic paintings including The Turkish Bath by Jean-Auguste-Dominique Ingres; in Llandudno, Wales (d. 2010)

== May 9, 1916 (Tuesday) ==
- Battle of Kondoa Irangi – South African forces withdrew to the outskirts of Kondoa Irangi in German East Africa and were better able to repel attacks from German forces.
- American cargo ship SS Roanoke foundered off the coast of California, killing 47 people.
- Born: Bernard Rose, British organist, President of the Royal College of Organists from 1974 to 1976; in Sawbridgeworth, England (d. 1996)
- Died: Thomas Kent, 50, Irish nationalist, executed for his role in the Easter Rising; executed by firing squad (b. 1865)

== May 10, 1916 (Wednesday) ==
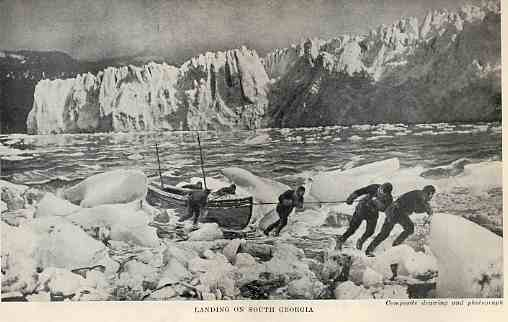
Depiction of the James Caird landing at South Georgia.

- Battle of Kondoa Irangi – The Germans failed to dislodge the embedded South African forces from Kondoa Irangi in German East Africa and were forced to withdraw, at a cost of 85 killed and 35 taken prisoner. The South African force only lost 6 men killed and 18 wounded.
- Voyage of the James Caird – Ernest Shackleton and his crew of five landed at King Haakon Bay on South Georgia Island where they rested before they began their overland trek to reach the whaling communities on the north coast of the island and seek rescue for the main body of the failed Imperial Trans-Antarctic Expedition.
- Born: Milton Babbitt, American composer, known for compositions including Philomel and Composition for Four Instruments; in Philadelphia, United States (d. 2011)

== May 11, 1916 (Thursday) ==
- Easter Rising – During a debate in British Parliament on the Irish crisis, John Dillon of the Irish Parliamentary Party called on the British government to end the executions of the Easter Rising leaders.
- A U.S. Army expedition crossed the Rio Grande and arrived at El Pino, Coahuila, Mexico and rescued two U.S. Cavalry men being held prisoner by Pancho Villa loyalists.
- Born: Camilo José Cela, Spanish writer, recipient of the Nobel Prize in Literature, author of The Family of Pascual Duarte and The Hive; in Padrón, Spain (d. 2002)
- Died:
  - Max Reger, 43, German composer, known for his compositions Variations and Fugue on a Theme by Mozart and Requiem; died of a heart attack (b. 1873)
  - Karl Schwarzschild, 42, German physicist, author of the solution used to prove Einstein field equations for general relativity (b. 1873)

== May 12, 1916 (Friday) ==
- The New Zealand Mounted Rifles Brigade began patrols in the Sinai desert.
- Easter Rising – On the same day British Prime Minister H. H. Asquith arrived in Dublin for a week-long visit, Irish leaders Seán Mac Diarmada and James Connolly were executed. Connolly, who was wounded in the fighting, was strapped to a chair and shot.
- Anglo-Egyptian Darfur Expedition – A British air reconnaissance dropped leaflets over El Fasher where the main force of Sultan Ali Dinar of the Sultanate of Darfur (now Sudan) was situated, promising freedom of religion and justice to the Sudanese people if they submitted and allowed the removal of the Sultan.
- Born:
  - Hank Borowy, American baseball player, starting pitcher for the New York Yankees, 1943 World Series champion; as Henry Ludwig Borowy, in Bloomfield, New Jersey, United States (d. 2004)
  - W. D. Jones, American gangster, member of the Barrow Gang led by Bonnie and Clyde; as William Daniel Jones, in Henderson County, Texas, United States (shot and killed by police, 1974)

== May 13, 1916 (Saturday) ==
Johnny Loftus aboard George Smith

- The New Zealand Division moved into front-line trenches at Armentières, France.
- American thoroughbred race horse George Smith with jockey Johnny Loftus won the 42nd running of the Kentucky Derby with a time of 2:04.00.
- The musical comedy The Happy Day by Seymour Hicks, with music by Sidney Jones and Paul Rubens, debuted at the Daly's Theatre in London and ran a total 241 performances.
- Died: Sholem Aleichem, 57, Ukrainian-American Yiddish writer, most famous for his short stories of Tevye which inspired the musical Fiddler on the Roof; died of tuberculosis and diabetes (b. 1859)

== May 14, 1916 (Sunday) ==
- Anglo-Egyptian Darfur Expedition – Anglo-Egyptian forces sent to quell rebellion in the Sultanate of Darfur left Abiad to march on the main stronghold in El Fasher.
- U.S. Cavalry and Pancho Villa rebels engaged in a firefight at Castillon, Coahuila, Mexico that killed five Mexicans and wounded two more.
- Born:
  - Sammy Luftspring, Canadian boxer, winner of the 1938 Canadian welterweight championship; in Toronto, Canada (d. 2000)
  - Robert F. Christy, Canadian-American physicist, member of the Manhattan Project; in Vancouver, Canada (d. 2012)

== May 15, 1916 (Monday) ==
- Battle of Asiago – Austria-Hungary launched a Strafexpedition, or punitive expedition, against the Italian First Army near Asiago in northern Italy. A break in the Italian line forced General Luigi Cadorna to scramble reinforcements to prevent the Austrians from taking nearby Vicenza and outflanking his main force.
- The German association football club Erlangen-Bruck was established in Erlangen, Germany, under the name of Markt Bruck.
- Easter Rising – The trial of Roger Casement for high treason began in London for his part in the Irish uprising.
- The Royal Flying Corps established the No. 50, No. 51 and No. 52 Squadrons.
- The U.S. Marines took control of Santo Domingo in the Dominican Republic.
- Nadir of American race relations: Jesse Washington, a 17-year-old black farmhand, was brutally lynched and murdered in Waco, Texas, by a crowd of white people immediately after his trial and conviction for the alleged murder of his employer's wife, Lucy Fryer, in Robinson, Texas. Fred Gildersleeve photographed the lynching in its entirely, a rarity among lynching events, sparking outrage across the country for the event and for societal tolerance for lynching.
- The borough of Brentwood, Pennsylvania, was established.
- Born: Catherine Shipe East, American activist, one of the founders of the National Organization for Women; in Barboursville, West Virginia, United States (d. 1996)
- Died: Ivory Kimball, 73, American judge, Justice for the Police Court of the District of Columbia from 1891 to 1910 (b. 1843)

== May 16, 1916 (Tuesday) ==
- Great Britain and France concluded the secret Sykes–Picot Agreement, which was to divide Arab areas of the Ottoman Empire into French and British spheres of influence, following the conclusion of World War I and the partitioning of the Ottoman Empire.
- Dutch freighter SS Batavier V struck a mine in the English Channel shortly after being released by the Imperial German Navy, killing four people.
- Born:
  - Margaret Ursula Jones, British archaeologist, best known for the exploration of the Mucking site in southern England; as Margaret Ursula Owen, in Birkenhead, England (d. 2001)
  - Ephraim Katzir, Ukrainian-Israeli state leader, 4th President of Israel; as Efraim Katchalski, in Kiev, Russian Empire (present-day Ukraine) (d. 2009)

== May 17, 1916 (Wednesday) ==
- Ten German submarines were ordered to patrol the North Sea until May 22 when they were to set up into warring positions.
- German submarine SM U-74 sank after an accidental explosion during a mine-laying mission, killing all 34 crew aboard.
- Anglo-Egyptian Darfur Expedition – Anglo-Egyptian military reconnaissance team rendezvoused at the village of Meliet in preparation to attack the Sudanese capital of El Fasher.
- Easter Rising – Edward O'Dwyer, Roman Catholic Bishop of Limerick, refused a request to discipline two of his curates who expressed Irish Republican sympathies, reminding Major-General John Maxwell, commander of British forces in Ireland that he had shown no mercy to those who surrendered.
- Royal Flying Corps pilot John Cyril Porte flew an experimental parasite fighter plane released from a Felixstowe Porte Baby airship at a height of 1000 ft (300 m).
- Born: William Brill, Australian fighter pilot, member of the Royal Air Force during World War II, recipient of the Distinguished Flying Cross; in Ganmain, New South Wales, Australia (d. 1964)

== May 18, 1916 (Thursday) ==
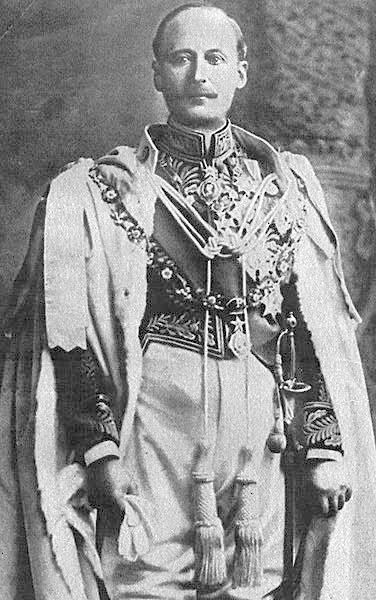
Lord Charles Hardinge

- Lord Charles Hardinge chaired the royal commission set up to investigate the causes of the Easter Rising in Dublin.
- Sinai and Palestine campaign – The Royal Flying Corps bombed Ottoman positions at El Arish in reprisal for an Ottoman air bombing at Port Said earlier in the month that left 23 casualties.
- American pilot Kiffin Rockwell shot down a German two-seater aircraft, the first aerial victory claimed by the Lafayette Escadrille, an American-manned squadron of the French Air Service.
- U.S. Navy destroyer USS Wilkes was launched by the William Cramp & Sons in Philadelphia and would serve in World War I and the United States Coast Guard until it was scrapped in 1934.
- Voyage of the James Caird – With the modified lifeboat dubbed James Caird too damaged to sail and two of the five-man rescue crew physically unfit to travel, Imperial Trans-Antarctic Expedition leader Ernest Shackleton and two companions decide to cross overland on South Georgia Island to reach the whaling communities on its north coast and obtain rescue for the main body of the expedition on Elephant Island.

== May 19, 1916 (Friday) ==
- French ace Jean Navarre shot down a German Aviatik fighter plane over Chattancourt, France, becoming the first Allied ace credited with 10 victories.
- The city of Berlin, Ontario, held a referendum to change its name due to Canada being part of the Allies against Germany in World War I. However, only 892 citizens out of about 15,000 eligible voters participated, with a small majority voting in favor of changing the city's century-old name without an alternative being mentioned. The city was officially renamed Kitchener in September following the death of Lord Kitchener in June.
- Born:
  - Ralph Landau, American chemical engineer, developer of over 75 petrochemical processes, recipient of the National Medal of Technology and Innovation, author of Technology and the Wealth of Nations; in Philadelphia, United States (d. 2004)
  - Blair Lee, American politician, acting Governor of Maryland from 1977 to 1979; as Francis Preston Blair Lee III, in Silver Spring, Maryland, United States (d. 1985)
- Died: Georges Boillot, 31, French race car driver and fighter pilot, first French driver to win the Indianapolis 500; died from injuries after being shot down near Bar-le-Duc, France (b. 1884)

== May 20, 1916 (Saturday) ==
- The small town of Codell, Kansas, was struck by a tornado, the first of three that occurred on the same date every year until 1918.
- Voyage of the James Caird – Imperial Trans-Antarctic Expedition leader Ernest Shackleton and two companions successfully crossed South Georgia Island after an exhausting 36-hour trek to reach the whaling community of Husvik on the north coast, where they made contact and arranged rescue for the main body of the expedition still stranded on Elephant Island. During the overland journey, Shackleton confided years later that in his exhausted state, he envisioned a fourth figure accompanied him and his two companions. This vision was concurred by his two companions leading him to conclude: "I have no doubt that Providence guided us."
- Norman Rockwell debuted his first cover for The Saturday Evening Post, titled Boy with Baby Carriage.
- The first issue of the weekly Afrikaans-language magazine Huisgenoot was published, becoming the highest-circulated magazine in South Africa.
- Born:
  - Owen Chadwick, British historian, co-authored with brother Henry Chadwick Oxford History of the Christian Church; as William Owen Chadwick, in Bromley, England (d. 2015)
  - Ondina Valla, Italian athlete, first Italian female athlete to win a gold medal at the 1936 Summer Olympics; as Trebisonda Valla, in Bologna, Kingdom of Italy (present-day Italy) (d. 2006)

== May 21, 1916 (Sunday) ==
- Daylight saving time began for the first time throughout the United Kingdom as people put their clocks forward one hour. The purpose is to reduce the number of evening hours to save fuel.
- Voyage of the James Caird – A whaling ship picked up the last two members of James Caird party on the opposing side of South Georgia Island.
- Born:
  - Wilhelm Batz, German air force officer, commander of the Jagdgeschwader 52 for the Luftwaffe during World War II, recipient of the Knight's Cross of the Iron Cross; in Bamberg, German Empire (present-day Germany) (d. 1988)
  - Dennis Day, American singer, best known for his popular radio show A Day in the Life of Dennis Day in the 1940s; as Owen Patrick Eugene McNulty, in New York City, United States (d. 1988)
  - James Reuter, American Jesuit Catholic priest, one of the key leaders in the People Power Revolution that overthrew Ferdinand Marcos in the Philippines; in Elizabeth, New Jersey, United States (d. 2012)
  - Harold Robbins, American novelist, author of The Carpetbaggers and A Stone for Danny Fisher; in New York City, United States (d. 1997)
- Died: Artúr Görgei, 98, Hungarian military general and politician, revolutionary leader during the Hungarian Revolution of 1848 (b. 1818)

== May 22, 1916 (Monday) ==
- Battle of Verdun – A French force of 12,000 soldiers under command of General Charles Mangin launched an assault to retake Fort Douaumont from the Germans.
- Anglo-Egyptian Darfur Expedition – Anglo-Egyptian forces defeated Sudanese force of 3,600 men at the village of Beringia near El Fasher, the capital of the Sultanate of Darfur, killing 231 warriors and wounding another 96 while only sustaining 23 casualties.
- Sinai and Palestine campaign – The Royal Flying Corps continued reprisals against the Ottoman Empire for their attack on Port Said with bombings on military camps along the Suez Canal front. The Ottomans retaliated in June with more bombings on Romani, Egypt where a new railroad had been constructed, inflicted 30 casualties.
- Voyage of the James Caird – Imperial Trans-Antarctic Expedition leader Ernest Shackleton chartered the whaling ship The Southern Sky to voyage to Elephant Island to pick up the main body of the stranded expedition but packed ice prevented them from getting near the island.
- A U.S. federal suit known as the United States v. Forty Barrels and Twenty Kegs of Coca-Cola failed to force The Coca-Cola Company to remove caffeine from its product.
- The first conference of the religious organization League for the Larger Life was held in New York City with over 1,000 in attendance.
- The film serial Gloria's Romance starring Billie Burke debuted, with actor Richard Barthelmess making his unaccredited debut as an extra. The film is now considered lost.
- Born: Arno Peters, German historian, developer of the Peters map; in Berlin, German Empire (present-day Germany) (d. 2002)

== May 23, 1916 (Tuesday) ==
- Anglo-Egyptian Darfur Expedition – A Sudanese force of 800 attacked the Anglo-Egyptian column at the village of Beringia near El Fasher but were repelled. The military expedition advanced into the capital of the Sultanate of Darfur only to find Sultan Ali Dinar had abandoned it with 2,000 of his men.
- Died: Charlie Douglas, 75, Scottish-New Zealand explorer, discovered and mapped West Coast, New Zealand; died of a cerebral hemorrhage (b. 1840)

== May 24, 1916 (Wednesday) ==
- Battle of Verdun – The French assault to retake Fort Douaumont failed, resulting in 5,640 casualties and 1,000 prisoners taken by the Germans.
- Born: Roden Cutler, Australian politician and army officer, 32nd Governor of New South Wales, recipient of the Victoria Cross for action at the Battle of Damour during World War II; as Arthur Roden Cutler, in Manly, New South Wales, Australia (d. 2002)

== May 25, 1916 (Thursday) ==
- The U.S. Army expedition sent to find the rebels involved in the Glenn Springs raid earlier in May returned to the United States following complaints from Mexican president Venustiano Carranza that American military presence in Mexico was pushing the two countries dangerously close to war.
- The Italian air squadron 76a Squadriglia was established as the second of Italy's original fighter squadrons.
- The association football club Huracán de Ingeniero White was established in Bahía Blanca, Argentina.
- The Norwegian sports club Heming was established in Oslo and hosted association football, Nordic skiing, alpine skiing, orienteering and tennis.
- Born: Brian Dickson, Canadian judge, 15th Chief Justice of Canada; as Robert George Brian Dickson, in Yorkton, Saskatchewan, Canada (d. 1998)
- Died:
  - Jane Dieulafoy, 64, French archaeologist, known for Susa excavations conducted with her husband Marcel-Auguste Dieulafoy (b. 1851)
  - Jack Marsh, 41–42, Australian cricketer, bowler of Australian Aboriginal descent for the New South Wales cricket team from 1900 to 1903; died after being physically assaulted (b. 1874)

== May 26, 1916 (Friday) ==
- British submarine HMS E18 went missing after this date and likely struck a mine and sank with all 31 crew on-board shortly thereafter as it failed to make its scheduled return to port on June 1. The wreck was discovered in 2009 off the coast of Estonia.
- Born:
  - Moondog, American musician, known for recorded albums including Sax Pax for a Sax, best known for his eccentric, busker style that earned him the nickname "the Viking of 6th Avenue", in Marysville, Kansas (d. 1999)
  - Edward A. Carter Jr., American army officer, recipient of the Medal of Honor, one of seven African Americans recipients for service during World War II; as Louis Thomas Hardin, in Los Angeles, United States (d. 1963)
  - Edwin L. Moore, American agricultural scientist, developed the process for frozen orange juice along with Louis G. MacDowell and C. D. Atkins; in Springfield, Massachusetts, United States (d. 2009)
- Died:
  - Timothy Dwight, 87, American academic, 12th President of Yale University (b. 1828)
  - Étienne-Théodore Pâquet, 66, Canadian politician, cabinet minister for Quebec Premier Joseph-Adolphe Chapleau (b. 1850)

== May 27, 1916 (Saturday) ==
- German submarine SM UC-3 struck a mine and sunk with all 18 crew on board.
- Born:
  - Frances Lasker Brody, American arts advocate, founding benefactor of the Los Angeles County Museum of Art; as Frances Lasker, in Chicago, United States (d. 2009)
  - John Macionis, American competitive swimmer, three time NCAA champion from 1936 to 1938 and silver medalist in the 1936 Summer Olympics; in Philadelphia, United States (d. 2012)
- Died: Joseph Gallieni, 67, French army officer, recipient of the Legion of Honour for service during the Franco-Prussian War and commander of the First Battle of the Marne (b. 1849)

== May 28, 1916 (Sunday) ==
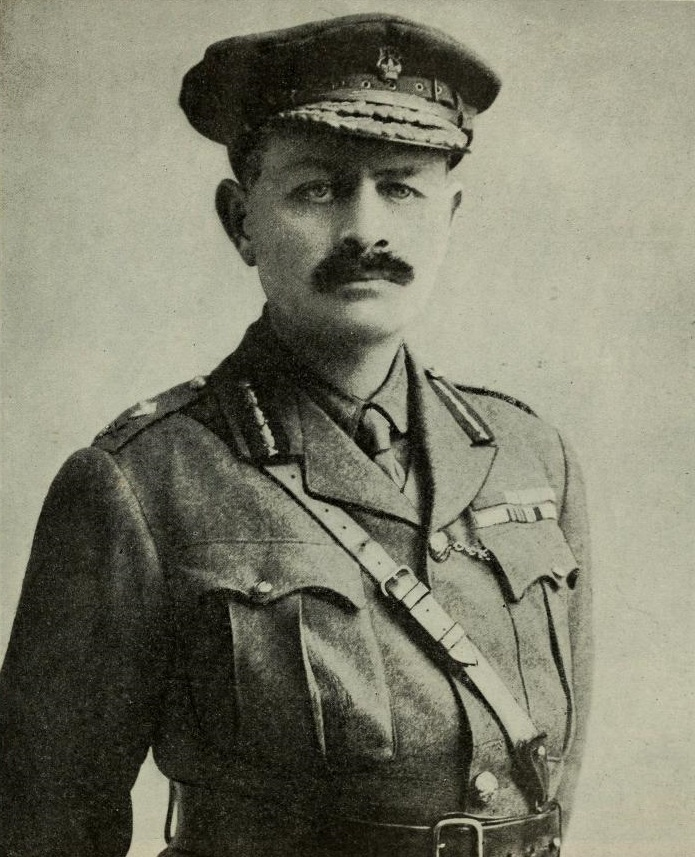
General Julian Byng

- Lieutenant-General Julian Byng was appointed commander of the Canadian Corps, replacing Lieutenant-General Edwin Alderson.
- British test pilot Harry Hawker flew the Sopwith Triplane on its first test run.
- Born: Walker Percy, American novelist, known for works including The Moviegoer and Lost in the Cosmos; in Birmingham, Alabama, United States (d. 1990)
- Died:
  - Matthew Chizhov, 77, Russian sculptor, noted for busts and monuments to Russian monarchs including Catherine the Great, Alexander II of Russia, and Nicholas I of Russia (b. 1838)
  - Ivan Franko, 59, Ukrainian poet, leading proponent of moderns in poetry in the Ukrainian language including Kamenyari (The Rock Breakers) (b. 1856)

== May 29, 1916 (Monday) ==
- The city of Monterey Park, California, was established.
- Died:
  - James J. Hill, 77, American financier and rail executive, owner of the Great Northern Railway and the Northern Pacific Railway (b. 1838)
  - Iron Tail, 73–74, Oglala chieftain, member of Buffalo Bill's Wild West Show (his profile is found on the famous Buffalo nickel) (b. 1842)

== May 30, 1916 (Tuesday) ==
- British racer Dario Resta won the 6th running of the Indianapolis 500 at the Indianapolis Motor Speedway in a Peugeot L45.
- Born:
  - James K. Johnson, American air force officer, flying ace with 10 kills during the Korean War, recipient of the Silver Star and Distinguished Flying Cross; in Phoenix, Arizona, United States (d. 1997)
  - Joseph W. Kennedy, American chemist, co-discover of plutonium and member of the Manhattan Project; in Nacogdoches, Texas, United States (d. 1957)
- Died: John S. Mosby, 82, American army officer, commander of the 43rd Battalion, Virginia Cavalry for the Confederate States Army during the American Civil War (b. 1833)

== May 31, 1916 (Wednesday) ==
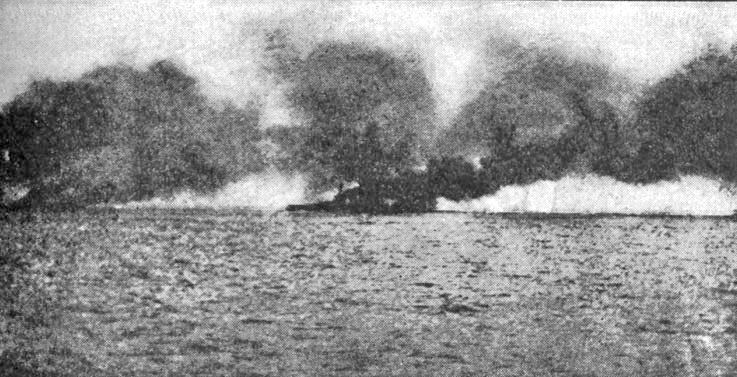
HMS Lion burning after being hit by a salvo from SMS Lützow

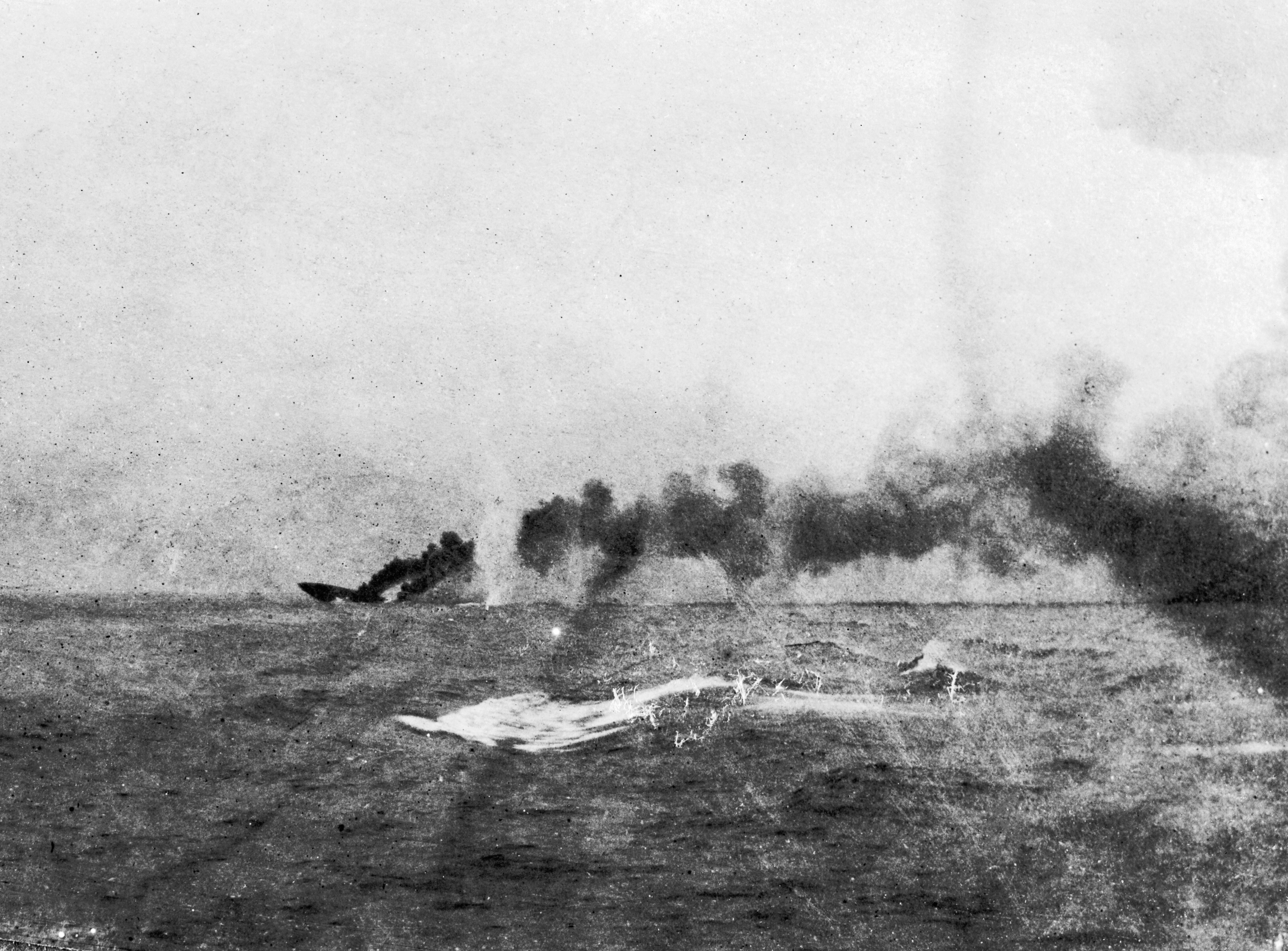
HMS Indefatigable sinking after being struck by shells from SMS Von der Tann

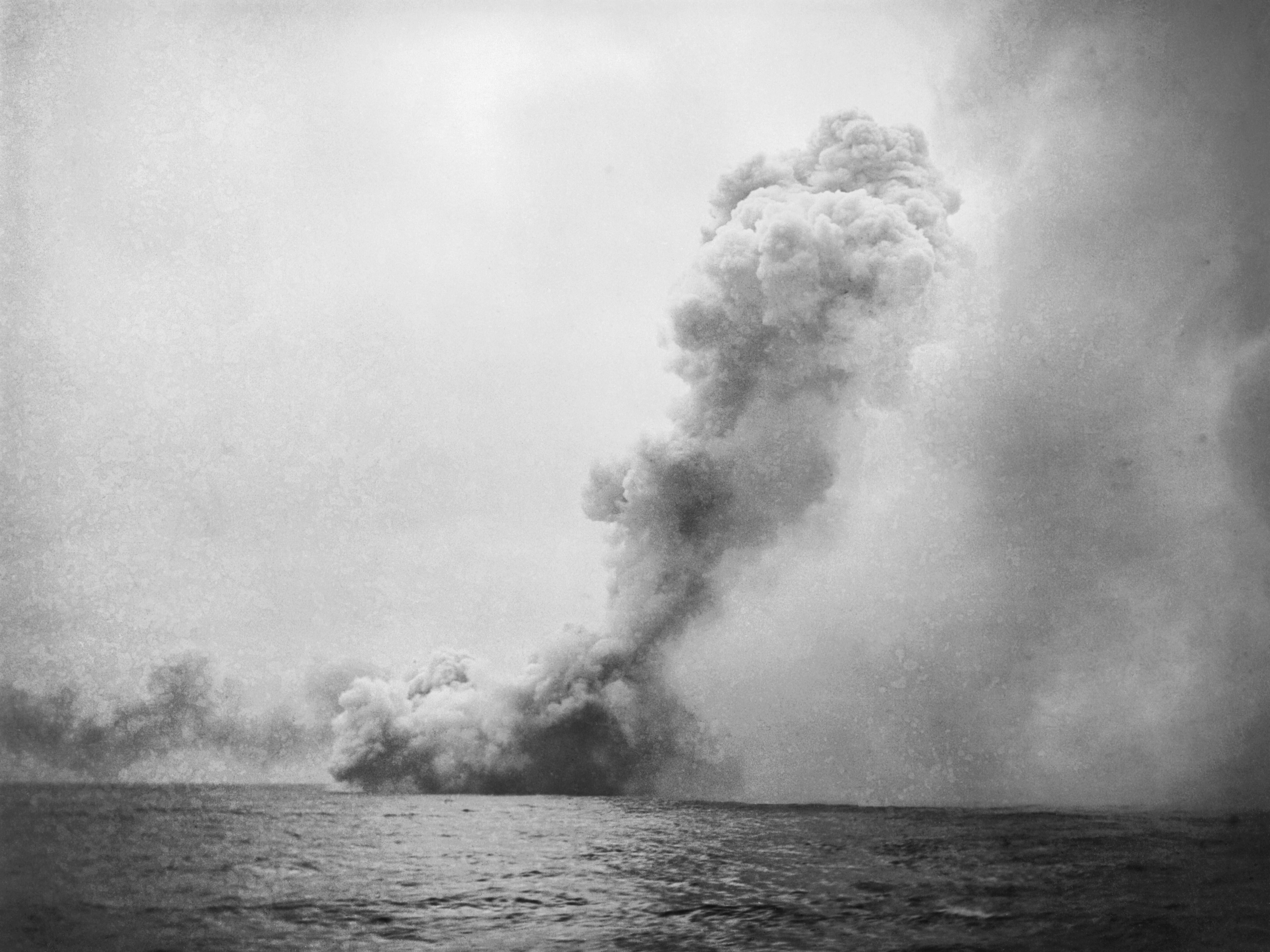
HMS Queen Mary sinking

- Battle of Jutland – The British Royal Navy Grand Fleet and the Imperial German Navy High Seas Fleet fought each other in the North Sea, the war's only large-scale clash of battleships. The first day of battle resulted in major losses for both sides, including:
  - British battleship HMS Invincible, sunk by German battleships SMS Lützow and SMS Derfflinger, resulting in 1,026 deaths including Rear Admiral Horace Hood;
  - British cruiser HMS Indefatigable, destroyed in the opening minutes of the battle by German cruiser SMS Von der Tann, killing all but two of her 1,019 crew, including Lieutenant-Commander John Skinner Wilson;
  - British cruiser HMS Queen Mary, sunk by Derfflinger with the loss of 1,266 crew;
  - British cruiser HMS Defence, hit by a German barrage that caused an explosion that destroyed the entire ship, with casualty accounts ranging from 893 to 903 casualties including ship commander Rear Admiral Robert Arbuthnot and British star rugby player and cricketer Cecil Abercrombie, who was serving on board as a naval officer;
  - British cruiser HMS Black Prince was shelled and sunk with all 857 crew on board.
  - British destroyer HMS Tipperary was shelled and sunk, with 150 of the 197 crew lost.
  - British destroyer HMS Nomad was hit and sank with a loss of eight crew. The remaining 72 survivors were captured by the German navy. Accompanying destroyer HMS Nestor was also damaged, but time allowed the crew to abandon ship before it sank.
  - British cruiser HMS Chester was struck 18 times by shells that ripped across the deck, sending shrapnel that killed 29 deck gunners and maimed another 49. One of the deck crew was 16-year old sight gunner Jack Cornwell who, while critically wounded, remained at his post even though the rest of his gun's crew was dead or dying around him. Cornwell survived several more days before succumbing to his injuries on June 2, and was posthumously awarded the Victoria Cross.
  - British cruiser HMS Lion survived the battle thanks to Royal Marine officer Francis Harvey, who ordered one the main gun turrets hit by German fire to be flooded to prevent ammunition from exploding and setting off a chain of explosions that destroyed the other British ships. Harvey was mortally wounded and perished along with 99 other sailors (plus 51 wounded) during the battle. He was awarded the Victoria Cross posthumously.
  - A Short Type 184 from the Royal Navy seaplane carrier Engadine achieved the only British aerial reconnaissance flight of the Battle of Jutland, reporting the sighting of three cruisers and ten destroyers of the German High Seas Fleet before a broken fuel pipe forced it to end the mission.
- An ambitious Franco-British offensive to land a decisive victory against Germany was reduced to a limited offensive to ease pressure of French forces at Verdun, in what became the strategic plan for the Battle of the Somme.
- The Italian air squadron 77a Squadriglia was established as the third of Italy's original fighter squadrons.
- The first version of the song "Calling Me Home to You" by Edward Teschemacher and Francis Dorel was recorded at Columbia Records with Alfred De Manby providing vocals.
- Born:
  - Archduke Felix, Austrian noble, last surviving son of Charles I and a member of the House of Lorraine; in Vienna, Austria-Hungary (present-day Austria) (d. 2011)
  - Bert Haanstra, Dutch filmmaker, best known for his Oscar-winning short documentary Glass and film comedies including Fanfare and Turkish Delight; as Albert Haanstrain, in Holten, Netherlands (d. 1997)
  - Bernard Lewis, British-American historian, noted for his works on the history of the Ottoman Empire, author of Islam and the West; in London, England (d. 2018)
  - Lydia Mendoza, American musician, promoter of traditional Mexican American guitar music; in Houston, United States (d. 2007)
