= Trolleybuses in Drammen =

Drammen trolleybus
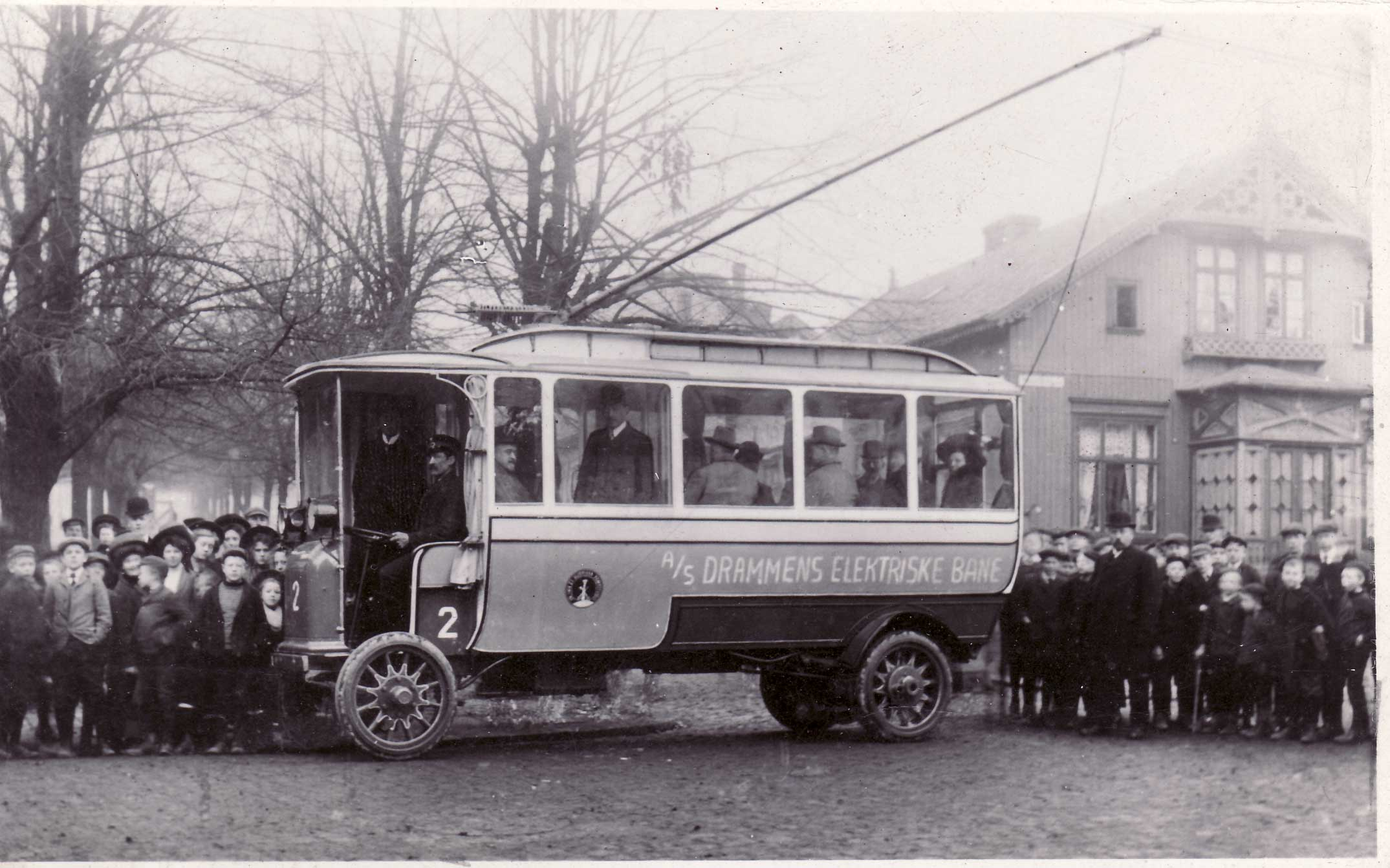

Overview
- Locale: Drammen, Norway
- Transit type: Trolleybus
- Number of lines: 3
- Daily ridership: 19,000 (1952)

Operation
- Began operation: 15 December 1909
- Ended operation: 10 June 1967
- Operator: Drammen Kommunale Trikk

Technical
- System length: 7.7 km

The Drammen trolleybus system was a system of trolleybuses in Drammen in Buskerud county, Norway, which operated between 15 December 1909 and 10 June 1967. The system stretched from the city center to Brakerøya, Merket and Vårveien and was operated by the companies Drammens Elektriske Bane, A/S Trikken and Drammen Kommunale Trikk. The system was well suited for Drammen, since the city has a lot of hills and cheap electricity.

== History ==
When the system opened in 1909 it was the first trolleybus system in Scandinavia. The first plans for public transport in Drammen were proposed by Carl Christian Juell for a horsecar system, but instead he started developing the Gothenburg tram in Gothenburg, Sweden. In the 1890s Oslo, Bergen and Trondheim got horsecar and later tram systems, and in 1904 it was proposed that also Drammen get a similar system. But Engineer Hans Jensen had been to Düsseldorf and seen the trolleybus system there, and in 1909 the company Drammens Elektriske Bane got permission to build a trolleybus system. The company had an initial capital of NOK 140,000 and built the 7.7 km line Bragerøen-Torvet-Landfalløen and Torvet-Tangen.

Drammen trolleybuses used the Schiemann system - two wires were located 15 cm apart (voltage: 550V); the vehicles used a single trolley pole. Drammen was the last trolleybus system in the world to use this type of current collection. The first four buses and the infrastructure were delivered by Max Schiemann & Co in Germany. The initial system had a headway of 30 minutes, but this was changed to 20 minutes in 1912. Within a few years the system had reached a ridership of more than one million passenger annually. During World War I the company came into deep economic problems, and the ticket price was increased from 10 øre to 15 øre and the municipality gave the company a 25% discount on electricity. Still, in 1916 the company went bankrupt. A new company, A/S Trikken, was created to continue operations.

The system had since the start had a disadvantage in that only empty buses could cross the City Bridge that connected the two lines. But in 1936 a new bridge was constructed allowing buses to drive in a continual, triangular loop. After World War II the system was again quite petty, and on 1 July 1947 the City Council created a municipal owned company, Drammen Kommunale Trikk (lit: Drammen Municipal Tram), to operate the system. The routes that in the 1930 had been reduced to 12 minutes headway were then reduced to 10 minutes and in 1951 to 9 minutes. In 1960 the company also rebuilt the buses so that they only needed a driver and not a driver and conductor and expanded the western route to Vårveien.

In 1960 the sale of cars in Norway was deregulated, resulting in an enormous fall in passenger numbers for the trolleybus system. On 7 January 1963 the route to Brakerøya was taken over by diesel buses. The rest of the system was closed on 10 July 1967. When the system closed, it was the second oldest operating trolleybus system in the world. The operating company was also responsible for the new diesel bus routes, and in 1981 it was merged to create Drammen og Omegn Busslinjer, now part of Nettbuss.
