= Steve Odland =

American businessman

- Born: 1958 (age 67–68)
- Education: University of Notre Dame (BA); Northwestern University (MA)
- Occupation: Businessman
- Known for: President and CEO of The Conference Board

Steve Odland (born 1958) is an American businessman. He is the president and CEO of The Conference Board. Previously he was chairman and CEO of Office Depot, Inc. and AutoZone, Inc., and president and CEO of Tops Markets and the Committee for Economic Development.

== Early life and education ==
Odland graduated from Mullen High School in Denver, Colorado. He received a BA in business administration from the University of Notre Dame and a MA in management from the Kellogg School of Management at Northwestern University.

== Career ==
Steve began his career at the Quaker Oats Company. From 1981 to 1996, he progressed through various positions and divisions at Quaker including pet foods, Golden Grain, international foods, and cereals. From 1996 to 1998, he was president of the Foodservice Division of Sara Lee Bakery. He subsequently became president and CEO of Tops Markets, a position he held until 2000.

From 2001 to 2005 Odland was president, chairman, and CEO of AutoZone. At the end of his tenure, AutoZone had over $5.6B in net sales, and approximately 3,500 stores and 45,000 employees across the U.S. and Mexico. He established the first corporate governance guidelines at the company. To drive teamwork and accountability he enacted, among other initiatives, the “40-headed CEO,” in which every month the 40 most senior executives (hence the "40-headed CEO”) convened for a half a day to review the company's operations, performance, and financials.

He was named top new CEO in 2002 by Bloomberg Markets Magazine.

He was the 2007 recipient of Florida Atlantic University's Business Leader of the Year.

From 2005 to 2010, Odland was chairman and CEO of Office Depot. During his tenure he implemented award-winning environmental initiatives ranging from green products to green buildings and energy saving measures. His commitment to diversity, including at the top echelons of the company, resulted in several awards and other accolades. The National Association for Female Executives named Office Depot as one of the top 30 companies dedicated to the advancement of women executives; the Women's Business Development Council named it the Florida Corporation of The Year; DiversityBusiness.com recognized the company as one of the top for multicultural business opportunities. Also, Office Depot's Supply Chain Diversity team published a catalog to exclusively feature Historically Underutilized Businesses – a first for the industry and one of the few such efforts in all of retailing. In the aftermath of the 2010 earthquake in Haiti, the Office Depot Foundation donated $10,000 to Doctors Without Borders to provide medical supplies; it also donated $10,000 to Feed The Children.

From 2011 to 2012, he taught as an adjunct professor in the graduate schools of business at Florida Atlantic University and Lynn University.

In 2017, in collaboration with Joseph Minarik, former senior vice president and director of research at the Committee for Economic Development, Odland co-authored Sustaining Capitalism: Bipartisan Solutions to Restore Trust & Prosperity.

From 2013 to June 2018, Odland was president and CEO of the Committee for Economic Development, a nonpartisan, business-led public policy organization that delivers analysis and solutions to major issues.

Since June 2018, Odland has been president and CEO of The Conference Board. The non-profit business membership and research organization counts over 2,000 public and private corporations and other organizations as members, including the majority of the Fortune 500.

In 2024, Odland was awarded the Foreign Policy Association Medal for The Conference Board's work in expanding the public’s knowledge of international affairs. It is the highest honor bestowed by the Foreign Policy Association, with past recipients including prime ministers, presidents, Federal Reserve chairs, and CEOs.

He is profiled in the books, Nobodies to Somebodies: How 100 Great Careers Got Their Start, and Leaders on Ethics: Real-world Perspectives on Today’s Business Challenges.

He currently is a director of General Mills, Inc., a trustee of The Conference Board, and a member of the Council on Foreign Relations.

Odland often provides commentary on various networks including Bloomberg, CNBC, and BBC News.

Odland is a former director of Analogic Corporation. He also has been a member of the Business Roundtable and Chairman of its Corporate Governance Taskforce; a U.S. Presidential Appointee as commissioner on the National Surface Transportation Policy and Revenue Study Commission; a member of the Committee on Capital Markets Regulation; a U.S. Presidential Appointee on the President's Council on Service and Civic Participation; a member of the Advisory Council of the Institute for Corporate Ethics; a member of the Advisory Council of the University of Notre Dame Mendoza College of Business; Chairman of Memphis Tomorrow; and a member of the Florida Council of 100.
