= DKT (disambiguation) =

DKT may refer to:

- DKT International, a charitable non-profit organization
- Dyea-Klondike Transportation Company
- Drammen Kommunale Trikk, a Norwegian company that operated the Drammen trolleybus and bus system
- Dorking West railway station, Surrey, England, the National Rail station code DKT
- Dresden-Klotzsche station, the DS100 code DKT
- Dkt, short for Docket (court)
