= C. D. Atkins =

American food scientist

- Born: Cedric Donald Atkins; September 7, 1913; Winter Haven, Florida, U.S.
- Died: June 3, 2000 (aged 86); Winter Haven, Florida, U.S.
- Known for: technology for frozen concentrated orange juice
- Spouse: Martha Kathryn Marsh
- Children: Barbara & Robert
- Awards: Great Floridian (2007); Florida Citrus Hall of Fame (1983); Florida Agriculture Hall of Fame (1986); Citrus Industry Emissary to Japan (1972) "Outstanding Service to Mankind" award from Florida Southern College
- Website: C. D. Atkins

C. D. Atkins (September 7, 1913 – June 3, 2000) was a scientific researcher for the United States Department of Agriculture (USDA). With Edwin L. Moore and Louis G. MacDowell in the 1940s, he helped develop a new process for making concentrated orange juice. All three men were inducted together into the Florida Citrus Hall of Fame in 1983 and the Florida Agricultural Hall of Fame in 1986 for their contributions to the Citrus Industry.

== Early life and education ==
"C.D." Atkins was born in Winter Haven, Florida to James H. Atkins, a telegraph operator for the railroad, and his wife Christina Emmeline Edwards who taught elementary school. The family owned about 200 acres (0.81 km^{2}) that were inherited, planted in orange trees for supplemental income. Atkins graduated from Winter Haven High School in 1930 and enrolled at the University of Florida, intending to become a doctor. He studied science but became an Agriculture major and joined the Alpha Gamma Rho Agricultural Fraternity when he realized he could not afford medical school. At the height of the great depression, his parents could no longer afford his tuition, room, and board, so he returned home after three years in Gainesville. He enrolled at Florida Southern College, able to live at home and commute to Lakeland, Florida, 15 miles away. To help pay his tuition, he taught chemistry, physics and biology. Atkins earned a Bachelor of Science degree in 1937.

== Career ==
After graduating from Florida Southern, he was a teacher at Plant City High School and Ft. Meade High School. He then coached football and was a math and science instructor at his alma mater, Winter Haven High School. He taught summer school in 1942 and began working for the Florida Citrus Commission, part-time. Atkins worked with Dr. Edwin L. Moore and Dr. Louis G. MacDowell on their research team. Atkins was offered a position at the United States Department of Agriculture (USDA) lab in Winter Haven. He decided to leave teaching and become a research scientist. The team was investigating how to create better tasting orange juice concentrate for the U.S. Army and how to more efficiently utilize Florida's crop of oranges. The process of concentration heats the juice causing the water to evaporate. Unfortunately, some of the flavor and much of the Vitamin C is lost. The group determined that adding a small percentage of fresh juice into the concentrate restored the flavor and vitamin C. This operation was coined, "cutback". The new frozen juice concentrate was marketed with the Snow Crop brand which eventually became Minute Maid.

Graph of Florida orange production

=== Florida orange juice production ===
Season	Production	Fruit	Juice
1946-1947	53.7 million boxes	63%	37%
1956-1957	93.0 million boxes	27%	73%
1994-1995	200 million boxes	5%	95%

In 1946-47, 63% of oranges were sold as fresh fruit; just over a third were converted to juice. In that year, there was such an oversupply that Florida farmers were cutting them down their orange trees and replacing them with avocados. A patent was granted to the researchers in 1946; however, the federal government received all the rights. Eventually their frozen concentrate process was widely utilized and resulted in higher demand for oranges and expanded demand for processing, warehousing and transporting the juice.

=== Later work ===
Atkins worked in Lake Alfred, Florida at the Citrus Experimental Station where he helped develop essences of citrus juice. He designed essence units and evaporators for the citrus industry, including a Lykes Pasco unit in 1970 that was the largest in the world. He authored another six patents, including a sports drink with orange juice, a carbonated beverage syrup that was pulp-free, and a process to extract aroma from fresh juice and adding it to a concentrate, enhancing its flavor. He was also the author of many scientific papers.

== Honors ==
- The "Dream Team" became members of the Florida Citrus Hall of Fame in 1983.
- The "Dream Team" became members of the Florida Agricultural Hall of Fame in 1986.
- "Outstanding Service to Mankind" award from Florida Southern College.
- Japanese Emissary in 1972 representing the citrus industry.
- In 2007 all three researchers were recognized as Great Floridians. The program honors persons making major contributions to Florida's progress and the welfare of the state.

== Death ==
The cutback process is still largely used to this day. Atkins retired in 1972, after working 30 years for the Florida Department of Citrus. He died in his hometown of Winter Haven in June 2000 at the age of 86. His wife died five years later.

== Image and caption ==
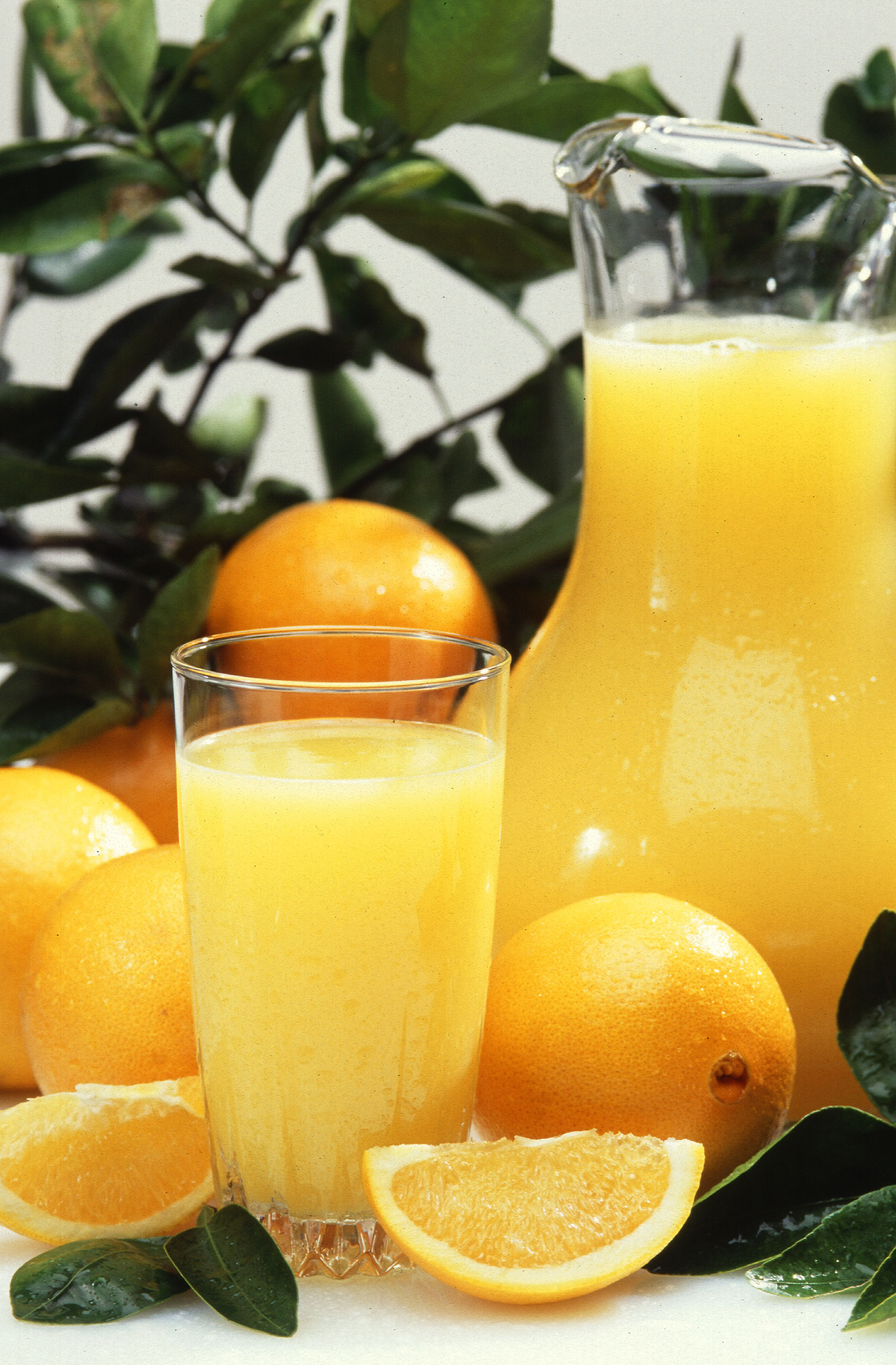

Original caption of image: In the 1940s, frozen orange juice was just a flavorless commercial flop. The only orange juice you could get back then was either squeezed from fresh oranges, mixed from a relatively tasteless concentrate, or poured from a can-and it tasted like a can! All this at a time when lots of good Florida oranges were going to waste. 80 years ago, Louis G. MacDowell, director of research for the Florida Citrus Commission, had an idea. He suggested that adding a little single-strength fresh juice, or "cut-back," to slightly overconcentrated orange juice might restore the flavor and aroma lost during vacuum evaporation. He took the idea to USDA researchers, the folks with the equipment and expertise to help develop the idea. Not only did it work but the vastly improved concentrate could be easily frozen. And so began the success story that's now such a familiar sight on the breakfast table-frozen concentrated orange juice.

== See also ==
- Orange juice
- Orange (fruit)
- Juice
- Food grading
