= Louis G. MacDowell =

American food scientist

Dr. Louis G. MacDowell
- Born: Louis Gardner MacDowell; July 29, 1912; Asbury Park, New Jersey, U.S.
- Died: July 10, 1986 (aged 73); Lakeland, Florida, U.S.
- Education: Bachelor of Science, Doctor of Science both in Chemistry
- Alma mater: Massachusetts State College
- Known for: technology for frozen concentrated orange juice
- Awards: Florida Citrus Hall of Fame (1983); Florida Agriculture Hall of Fame (1986) "Distinguished Service Award" from United States Department of Agriculture; Distinguished Service Award from University of Florida on their Centennial (1953)
- Scientific career
- Fields: Food technology
- Workplaces: Citrus and Research Education Center, Lake Alfred
- Website: Louis G. MacDowell

Louis Gardner MacDowell was a researcher for the United States Department of Agriculture (USDA). With Edwin L. Moore and C. D. Atkins in the 1940s, he helped develop a new process for making concentrated orange juice. All three men were inducted together into the Florida Agricultural Hall of Fame in 1986 and the Florida Citrus Hall of Fame in 1983 for their contributions to the Citrus Industry.

MacDowell died in July 1986 at his home in Lakeland, Florida.
