= Drammen Kommunale Trikk =

Bus and trolleybus operator in Drammen, Norway

A/S Drammen Kommunale Trikk
- Industry: Transport
- Founded: 1947
- Defunct: 1981
- Fate: Merger
- Successor: Drammen og Omegn Busslinjer
- Headquarters: Drammen, Norway
- Parent: Municipality of Drammen

Drammen Kommunale Trikk (DKT) (lit: Drammen Municipal Tram) was a Norwegian company that operated the Drammen trolleybus and bus system between July 1, 1947 and 1981, though the trolleybus system was closed in 1967. The company was started by the Drammen City Council when the licence of the former operator of the trolleybuses, A/S Trikken, went out of date. The company operated both the trolleybuses and diesel buses of Drammen until 1981, when the company was merged to create a common operating company for Drammen, Lier and Nedre Eiker. The new company was named Drammen og Omegn Busslinjer, and was sold to Nettbuss in 1999.
