= Battle of Kondoa Irangi =

1916 WWI battle in German East Africa

- Part of the East African Campaign (World War I)
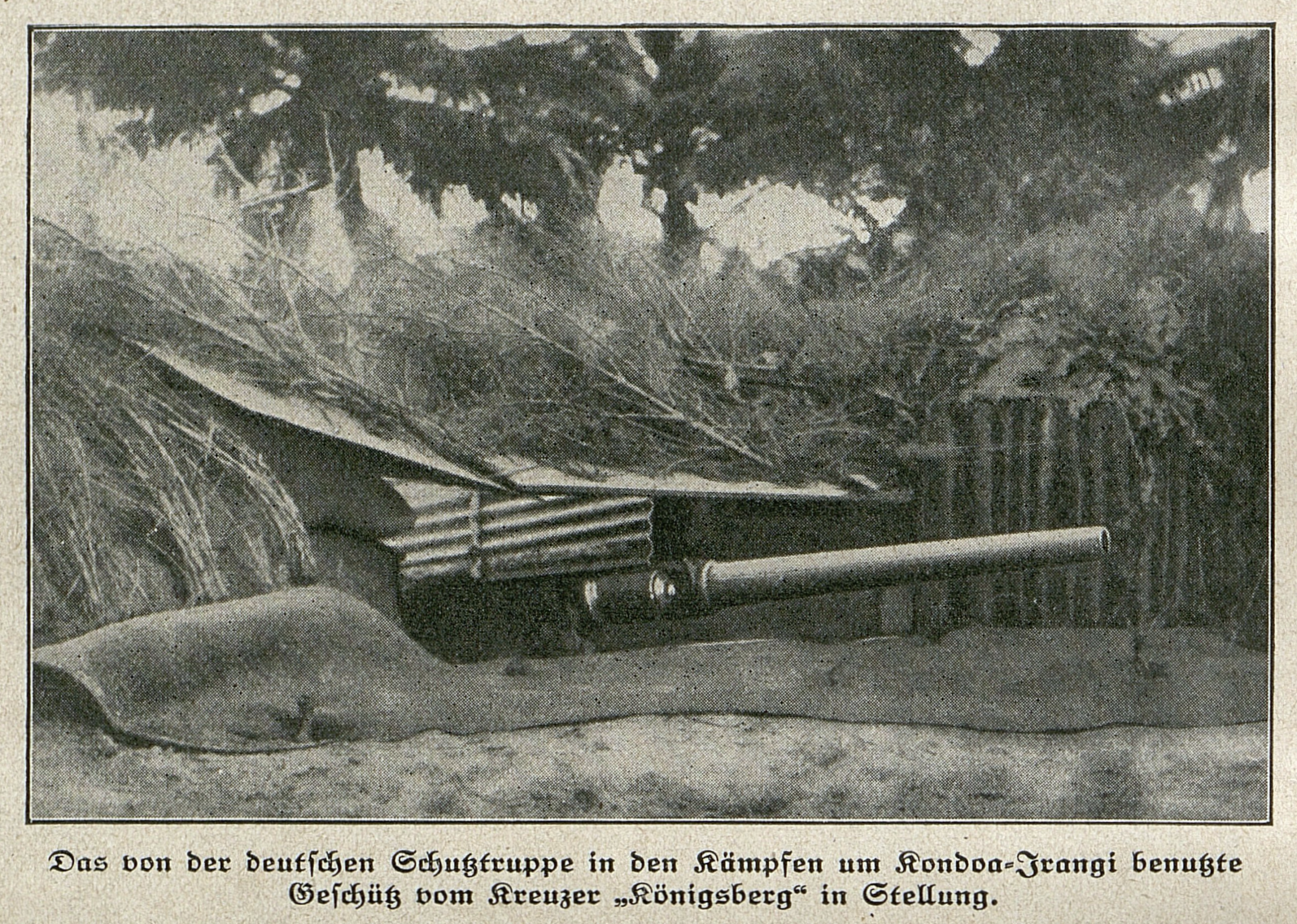
- Gun used by the German Schutztruppe in the battle for Kondoa Irangi from the cruiser SMS Königsberg in position
Date	7–10 May 1916
Location	Kondoa Irangi, German East Africa 4°54′30″S 35°47′30″E
Result	German victory

Belligerents
German Empire: German East Africa	British Empire: Union of South Africa

Commanders and leaders
(German Empire) Paul Emil von Lettow-Vorbeck	(Union of South Africa) Jacob van Deventer

Strength
4,000; 6 field guns	3,000

Casualties and losses
5 killed 15 captured	60 killed 180 wounded
- Location within Tanzania Battle of Kondoa Irangi (Africa)

The Battle of Kondoa Irangi took place during the East African Campaign of World War I.

== Background ==
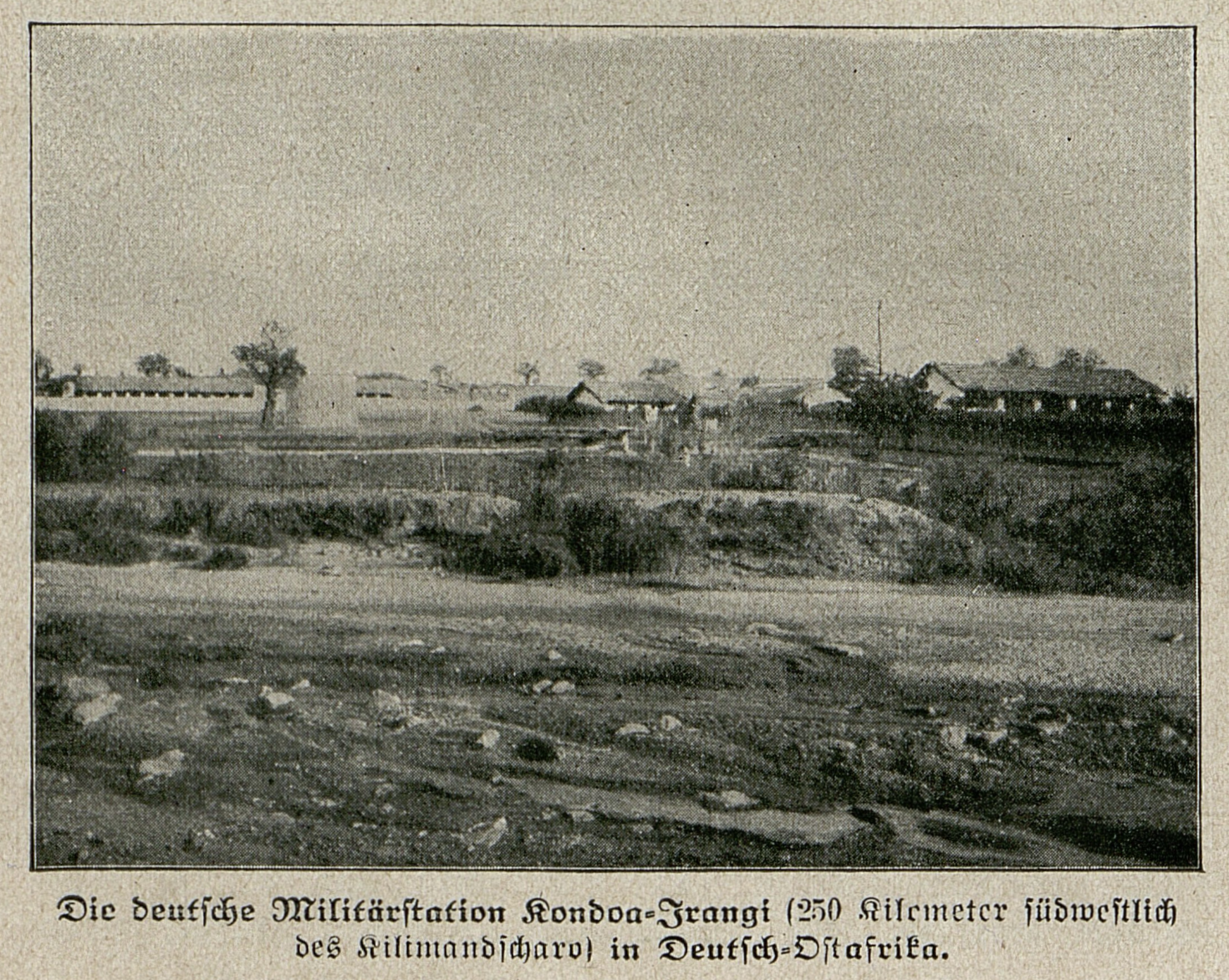
German military station Kondoa Irangi

Following successes at the battles of Latema Nek and Kahe, Entente forces under the overall command of General Jan Smuts continued their advance southwards into German East Africa. By 17 April 1916, General Van Deventer's 2nd Division had reached the vicinity of the town of Kondoa Irangi - where they made contact with a unit of German Schutztruppe. The 2nd Division succeeded in pushing the enemy back, and captured the town on 19 April. Entente casualties were minimal, whilst 20 Askari and 4 Germans were killed and 30 Askaris captured. Also found were 80 modern rifles with ammunition and a large herd of cattle. Despite low casualties, Van Deventer told the high command that the 2nd Division was exhausted and would be unable to continue the advance for some time. During its advance from Moshi, the division had lost more than 2,000 horses, mostly due to the Tsetse fly. Smuts then ordered van Deventer to consolidate his position at Kondoa Irangi, and reinforcements were brought up to aid this process.

During this period, the rainy season began. This caused huge supply problems for the Entente force, as railway bridges were washed away by swollen rivers and roads became impassable. The 2nd Division was completely cut off, and was forced to scavenge for supplies around Kondoa. The result was a fall in health and morale.

== The German Attack ==
While Van Deventer was stuck in Kondoa, German commander Paul von Lettow-Vorbeck used the delay to hurriedly reinforce his positions around the town - bringing a large proportion of his total force in from Tjsambara. By early May, around 4,000 German troops had reached the area. The 2nd Division had by this point been weakened by illness and malnutrition and was reduced to just 3,000 men at Kondoa Irangi.

The enemy assault began on 7 May as Lettow-Vorbeck's companies advanced to within 6 miles of Kondoa. Van Deventer withdrew his outlying positions and prepared to defend the centre of the town itself.

On 9 May the German attack commenced once again, starting with an assault on the south-east of the town which began at 7:30 pm. Four separate waves attacked, but all were repulsed with casualties by the 12 South African Regiment. In some places Germans reached the trenches themselves before being forced back by machine gun fire. The attack stopped in the early hours of 10 May having failed to dislodge Van Deventer from the town. The South Africans finally had to withdraw due to heavy German pressure and occupied the town only after the Germans had already left.

== Aftermath ==
After the battle, Lettow-Vorbeck continued to occupy positions in Kondoa for two months, launching sporadic raids on Van Deventer's supply columns and communications, and shelling the South Africans with artillery - including two heavy guns salvaged from SMS Königsberg. Van Deventer was unable to attempt an advance due to a lack of horses and the exhaustion of his whole division. General Smuts sent three further South African Regiments - the 10th, 7th and 8th, to secure the position. These men arrived on 23 May but were too late to save the initial positions and the town. In any case, their superior numbers forced von Lettow-Vorbeck to withdraw.
