= Drammens Elektriske Bane =

Norwegian trolleybus operating company between 1909 and 1916

A/S Drammens Eletriske Bane
- Industry: Transport
- Founded: 1908
- Defunct: 1916
- Fate: Bankrupt
- Successor: A/S Trikken
- Headquarters: Drammen, Norway

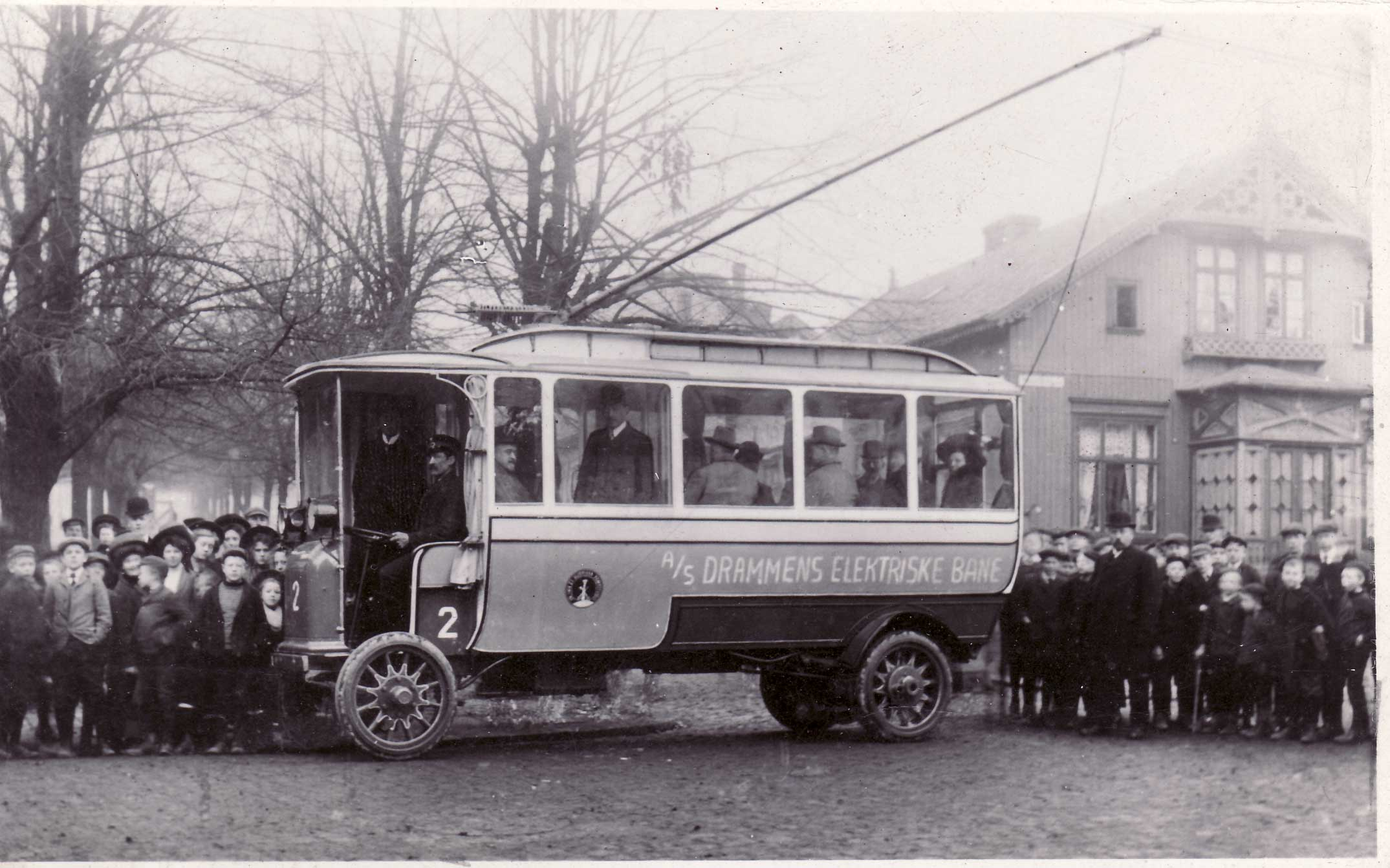
mini

Drammens Elektriske Bane (lit: Drammens Electric Rail) was a Norwegian company that operated the Drammen trolleybus between December 15, 1909 and April 30, 1916. The company was started by M. Magnus, Otto Aubert and Olaf Berger in 1908 and built the initial 7.7 km of trolleybus line in Drammen with a capital of NOK 140,000. The company had good economy until World War I when the company ran into great economic problems. They initially tried to solve the problem by increasing the ticket price from 10 øre to 15 øre and a 25% discount on electricity from the municipality, but could not meet their obligations. The remains of the company were taken over by A/S Trikken.
