= Magnus W. Alexander =

German-born American engineer

Magnus Wilhelm Alexander
- Born: February 1870; Germany
- Died: September 10, 1932 (aged 62)
- Education: University of Vienna, University of Leoben, University of Graz
- Occupations: Electrical Engineer, Social Reformer
- Employer(s): General Electric, Westinghouse Electric Company, Siemens and Halske Electric Co.
- Organizations: National Association of Corporate Schools, American Management Association, National Society for the Promotion of Industrial Education, American Institute of Electrical Engineers (AIEE)
- Known for: Work at General Electric, Westinghouse Electric Company, Social reforms in workmen's compensation and retirement benefits
- Notable work: Creation of General Electric Education and Personnel Department

Magnus Wilhelm Alexander (February 1870 – September 10, 1932) was a German-born American electrical engineer and a technical designer for the General Electric Company and the Westinghouse Electric Company. He also became a social reformer in the United States of America by working on state boards and commissions in such areas as workmen's compensation and retirement benefits.

Alexander was the son of Alexander M. and M. (Jelenkiewicz) A. Alexander. He studied mechanics, metallurgy, and electrical engineering at the Austrian universities of Vienna, 1889, the Leoben, 1891, and the University of Gratz, 1892.

Following the completion of his engineering education, Alexander was employed by Austria's largest steel-making company. In 1893, he joined Weston Electrical Instrument Company as an engineer and a technical designer. In the following year, he was recruited by Westinghouse Electric and Manufacturing Co., and he emigrated to the United States. After five years with the Westinghouse Corp., he joined the Siemens and Halske Electric Co., a German corporation with operations in North America. In the year 1900, the General Electric Company hired him as its chief engineer in charge of design, which was a position that he held until 1918. Thereafter, he served as GE's consulting engineer on economic issues until 1922.

While with General Electric, Alexander began turning his attention to industrial education. He created and directed the General Electric Education and Personnel Department in Lynn, Massachusetts. In 1907, he set up a partnership between G.E. and the Massachusetts Institute of Technology in which G.E. provided both apprenticeships and in-house technical courses for newly graduated M.I.T. engineers.

Alexander also served on the Old Age Pension Commission of Massachusetts and on the Massachusetts Workman's Compensation Commission. He became a charter member of the National Association of Corporate schools, the American Management Association, the National Society for the Promotion of Industrial Education, and of the American Institute of Electrical Engineers (AIEE).

Alexander was an early participant, along with Wesley Mitchell and Malcolm Rorty, in the National Bureau of Economic Research. He also created the National Industrial Conference Board (now known as The Conference Board) along with Frederick P. Fish, Frank A. Vanderlip, and Loyall Osborne.
