= A/S Trikken =

Trolleybus operator in Drammen, Norway

- Industry: Transport
- Founded: 1916
- Defunct: 1947
- Fate: Lost operating licence
- Successor: Drammen Kommunale Trikk
- Headquarters: Drammen, Norway
- Parent: Øverby & Larsen

A/S Trikken (lit: The Tram) was a Norwegian company that operated the Drammen trolleybus between May 1, 1916, and July 1, 1947. The company was started by the electrical company Øverby & Larsen, that bought the remains of the bankrupt Drammens Elektriske Bane who had operated the trolleybuses since 1909. A/S Trikken operated the system until the end of June 1947 when their licence was not renewed and the municipality took over operation through the company Drammen Kommunale Trikk.
