= Kolo (Tanzanian ward) =

Ward in Kondoa, Dodoma, Tanzania

Coordinates: 4°44′S 35°50′E

Kolo is an administrative ward in the Kondoa district of the Dodoma Region of Tanzania.

According to the 2002 census, the ward has a total population of 8,268.

In the vicinity of Kolo, the Kondoa Irangi Rock Paintings have been discovered in 1935.
