= Committee for Economic Development =

American think tank

Committee for Economic Development of The Conference Board
- Abbreviation: CED
- Formation: 1942
- Type: Think tank nonprofit organization
- Headquarters: New York, NY, United States
- Website: www.ced.org

The Committee for Economic Development of The Conference Board (CED) is an American nonprofit and nonpartisan public policy think tank founded in 1942. The board of trustees consists primarily of senior corporate executives from a range of U.S. industries and sectors. CED has been credited with helping to create the Marshall Plan.

== History ==
According to Fortune the organization "originated in the Commerce Department" in 1942 and was created to encourage collaborative research among business leaders, economists, and New Deal politicians "to promote free enterprise and full employment, paying particular attention to the needs of small business".

The first business leaders on board were Paul G. Hoffman, president of Studebaker Corporation; William Benton, co-founder of Benton & Bowles advertising firm; and Marion B. Folsom, treasurer of Eastman Kodak Company. CED was first formed to help the U.S. economy transition from a wartime to peacetime economy. At the end of World War II, CED worked to garner support among the American business community for the Marshall Plan.

In January 2015, the Committee for Economic Development merged with The Conference Board. Both are non-partisan, non-lobbying, and have trustees drawn mainly from the business community.

== Work ==
The CED has been credited with helping to create the Bretton Woods Agreement, the Employment Act of 1946 (and therefore the Council of Economic Advisers and the Joint Economic Committee) and the Marshall Plan.

Since its inception, CED has promoted policies that its trustees believe will foster American economic growth and development and indirectly benefit the country and people. The organization conducts research and outreach efforts in the U.S. and abroad to change policy at all levels of government. More recently CED has also advocated to increase access to pre-kindergarten and college, for campaign finance reform nationally, for more women in corporate leadership, and for reduced government spending.

== Stated aims ==
As of 2022, CED's stated aims were to sustain and promote free enterprise, improve education and healthcare, reform campaign finance, enhance corporate governance, and improve the fiscal health of the United States.

== Reception ==
The organization has been called "the capitalists who cared enough about the system to save it."
