= The Conference Board =

American non-profit research organization

- Formation: 1916; 110 years ago
- Type: Business membership and research organization
- Legal status: 501(c)(3) nonprofit
- Headquarters: 875 Third Avenue; New York City, United States
- Region served: Global; regional offices in New York, Brussels, Beijing, Hong Kong, Singapore, Toronto
- Key people: Steve Odland, President and CEO
- Staff: 300
- Website: www.conference-board.org

The Conference Board, Inc. is a 501(c)(3) non-profit business membership and research organization. It counts 2,000 public and private corporations and other organizations as members, including the majority of the Fortune 500.

The Conference Board convenes conferences and peer-learning groups, conducts economic and business management research, and publishes several widely tracked economic indicators.

== History ==
The organization was founded in 1916 as the National Industrial Conference Board (NICB). At the time, tensions between labor and management in the United States were seen as potentially explosive in the wake of the Triangle Shirtwaist Factory fire in 1911 and the Ludlow Massacre in 1914. In 1915, presidents of twelve major corporations in the United States and six leading industry associations met in Yama, New York to formulate the business community's response to continued labor unrest and growing public criticism.

Although many of the organizations’ founders—including former AT&T president Frederick P. Fish and General Electric executive Magnus W. Alexander, its first president—had supported the open-shop movement; by 1916, they regarded national unions such as the American Federation of Labor as permanent fixtures of the American economy, and urged negotiation and concord.

When the United States entered World War I in 1917, the National War Labor Board formed by President Woodrow Wilson asked the NICB to formulate plans that would keep war industries running and strife-free. Its recommendations—based on cooperation between representatives of employers, employees, and government—were adopted in full. Though often mistrusted in its early years as an “employers union” funding studies against the labor movement, the non-profit NICB was also seen “as a spokesman for the so-called progressive wing of the business community [and] produced hundreds of research reports on economic and social issues facing the United States.”

Pioneering research published in this period include Woman Workers and Labor Supply, The Eight-Hour Day Defined, U.S. Cost of Living Index, and a series of reports on Workers' Compensation Acts in The United States.

The organization today remains funded by the contributions of members, often Fortune 500 companies. By the 1930s, however, it had already lost most of its character as an industry lobby. Virgil Jordan, a writer and economist who replaced Alexander as president on the latter's death in 1932, established a Bureau of Economic Audit and Control to offer members and the public an independent source of studies on unemployment, pensions, healthcare, and related issues in the midst of the Great Depression, when many questioned the credibility of the government's economic statistics. Unions soon joined the NICB alongside corporations for access to its research, conferences, and executive network.

The organization is considered an unbiased "trusted source for statistics and trends, second only to perhaps the U.S. Bureau of Labor Statistics". After World War II, it expanded to non-U.S. members for the first time. In 1954, it founded The Conference Board of Canada. In 1959, its first overseas CEO-level meeting was held in Torquay, England, bringing together executives and board presidents from the US, UK, and Canada.

In January 1970, the National Industrial Conference Board officially changed its name to The Conference Board. This followed the launch in 1967 of the U.S. Consumer Confidence Index, a monthly survey of households that remains its flagship economic indicator. In 1976, it added the Measure of CEO Confidence, which tracks the attitudes of chief executives regarding economic conditions overall and within their industry (in conjunction with The Business Council).

In 1996, the U.S. Department of Commerce selected The Conference Board to produce and distribute the US leading economic indicator series.

In 2006, The Conference Board established its China Center for Economic and Business in Beijing as a resource for senior executives of multinational companies.

In 2015, the Committee for Economic Development (CED) merged with The Conference Board as its US public-policy center. The Conference Board has offices in New York, Brussels, Beijing, Hong Kong, Singapore, and Toronto.

In 2025, The Conference Board launched "Navigating Washington", a series focused on helping businesses adapt to the significant changes in US public policy. The suite of insights includes a tariff tracker, instant analysis of executive orders, and regular guidance on policies impacting the economy, corporate governance and sustainability, human capital, and other topics.

In 2026, Gillian Riley was appointed president to lead The Conference Board's Canada operations.

== Membership ==
The organization offers four membership tiers:

C-Suite Membership (Individual): for C-Suite-level executives.

Executive Membership (Group): for C-Suite-level executives and their leadership teams.

Leadership Membership (Group): for an organization's senior functional executives.

Council Membership (Individual): groups of around 40 executives.

== Councils (peer-to-peer forums) ==
The organization is considered a pioneer in professional councils, which were "created as a way to guide business leaders through boom and bust cycles." Each council is an invitation-only, self-governed group of executives.

Each year, around 4,000 executives participate in The Conference Board's 170+ councils. These range from networks organized for specific C-suite titles—including multiple councils for chief financial officers, chief human resources officers, chief legal officers, and corporate treasurers—to those focused on narrower areas of expertise or emerging business challenges, such as artificial intelligence.

== Events ==
The Conference Board organizes executive-level conferences across the United States, Europe, and Asia. Topics include health care, artificial intelligence, the workforce and workplace, marketing and communications, governance and sustainability, the economy, M&A, public policy, employee wellbeing, and others. These events convene business executives, academics, policymakers, and other subject-matter experts to discuss emerging trends, exchange perspectives, and examine management practices and policy issues affecting organizations worldwide.

The organization also hosts award ceremonies that honor companies and leaders for exemplary management in various areas.

== Centers ==
In the U.S., The Conference Board currently operates five Centers:

- Economy, Strategy, & Finance
- Marketing & Communications:
- Governance & Sustainability
- Human Capital
- The CEO Center (formerly Committee for Economic Development) (Public Policy)

In Europe, The Conference Board currently operates three Centers:

- Economy, Strategy, & Finance
- Governance & Sustainability
- Human Capital

In Asia, The Conference Board currently operates four Centers:

- China Center
- Economy, Strategy, & Finance
- Governance & Sustainability
- Human Capital

== Economic indicators and data ==
The Conference Board publishes a number of regular indicators for United States and international economies that are widely tracked by investors, business leaders, and policy makers. They include:

- U.S. Consumer Confidence Index – Begun by The Conference Board in 1967, this monthly survey of 5,000 households is widely established as the leading measure of American consumer confidence. Results from the household survey are tabulated to provide a barometer of the U.S. economy (currently indexed to the year 1985 = 100).
- CEO Confidence Survey – The quarterly Measure of CEO Confidence gauges the outlook of chief executives in their own industries and the economy as a whole, in conjunction with The Business Council. The survey also runs every six months in Europe - in cooperation with the European Round Table for Industry - and in China.
- CHRO Confidence Index – The quarterly CHRO Confidence Index gauges the hiring and retention outlook of US chief human resource officers.
- CCO+CMO Meter – A recurring tracker of marketing and communications leaders’ sentiment as to the impact they are having on their businesses and the value they are creating.
- US Job Satisfaction Survey – Annual survey launched in 1987 that acts as a barometer of US worker satisfaction, based on workers’ perceptions of their current role and their workplace environment. The latest survey tracks satisfaction across 26 components, from wages, promotion policy, and bonus plan to work/life balance, commute time, to physical workplace environment.
- US Salary Increase Budgets Survey – Since 1985, The Conference Board has been surveying compensation executives across industries and sectors on how much it plans to offer in annual salary increased. The survey asks about two main components of compensation: salary increase budget and salary structure movement. This year, 409 organizations completed the survey fielded between June 21 and July 17, 2023.
- Leading Economic Indexes – In the 1960s, the U.S. Department of Commerce began researching and releasing business cycle indicators, which use composite data points (including manufacturing, construction, and stock market indicators) to time economic expansions, recessions, and recoveries. In December 1995, The Conference Board took over the business indicator program from the government and continues to publish leading, coincident, and lagging indexes for the U.S. economy each month. The program was also expanded to other economies; beyond the U.S., The Conference Board currently publishes leading, coincident, and trailing indexes for the Australia, Brazil, China, the Euro Area, France, Germany, India, Japan, Mexico, South Korea, Spain, and the U.K.
- The Conference Board-Lightcast Help Wanted OnLine® (HWOL) Index measures changes over time in advertised online job vacancies, reflecting monthly trends in employment opportunities across the US. The HWOL Data Series aggregates the total number of ads available by month from the HWOL universe of online job ads. Ads in the HWOL universe are collected in real-time from over 50,000 online job domains. The online program is the successor of the Help Wanted Advertising Index program, which was based on counts of help-wanted job advertisements in major newspapers across the nation.

== Other research ==
The Conference Board's research reports and experts are often featured in a wide range of global business media—from specialist trade publications to the Financial Times, the Wall Street Journal, CNBC, Bloomberg News, Forbes and Fortune.

Notable examples include:

- C-Suite Outlook – Annual survey of the most pressing challenges and responses facing CEOs and other C-Suite executives across industries and regions.
- Toward Stakeholder Capitalism – the implications of this shift for the C-Suite.
- Board Effectiveness – an annual report, done in collaboration with PwC, on how boards can become more effective.
- Benchmarking reports that reveal emerging trends in areas including CEO succession, executive compensation, corporate board practices, and shareholder voting.
- Annual survey on US salary increase budgets across industries and seniority.
- Surveys of chief human resource officers on various workforce and workplace matters.
- Analyses on national public policy issues, including Social Security, infrastructure, cybersecurity, health care, labor shortages, national debt, energy transition, child care

== Awards ==
The Conference Board has received numerous awards:

- 2025 Best Companies to Work for in New York City
- 2025 Best Company Culture, Compensation, Work-Life Balance, Career Growth, Leadership
- 2024 Best Companies to Work for in New York State
- 2024 Best Places to Work for in New York City
- 2024 Best Perks & Benefits, Happiness, Leadership, Career Growth, Work-Life Balance, and Outlook
- 2023 Best Places to Work for in New York City
- 2023 Best Leadership, Company Culture, Happiness, Perks & Benefits, Compensation, Outlook
