= Edwin L. Moore =

American food scientist

- Born: Edwin L. Moore; May 26, 1916; Springfield, Massachusetts, U.S.
- Died: July 10, 2009 (aged 93); Auburndale, Florida, U.S.
- Education: Bachelor of Science, Master of Science, Doctor of Science all in Food technology
- Alma mater: Massachusetts State College
- Known for: technology for frozen concentrated orange juice
- Awards: Florida Citrus Hall of Fame (1983); Florida Agriculture Hall of Fame (1986) "Outstanding Service to Mankind" award from Florida Southern College
- Scientific career
- Fields: Food technology
- Workplaces: Citrus and Research Education Center, Lake Alfred
- Website: Edwin L. Moore

Edwin L. Moore (May 26, 1916 – July 10, 2009) was a researcher for the United States Department of Agriculture (USDA). With Louis G. MacDowell and C. D. Atkins in the 1940s, he helped develop a new process for making frozen concentrated orange juice. All three men were inducted into the Florida Citrus Hall of Fame in 1983 and the Florida Agricultural Hall of Fame in 1986 for their contributions to the Citrus Industry.

== Background ==
Moore was born in Springfield, Massachusetts, in 1916. When Moore was a child, he experimented once by growing a grapefruit tree in his basement, it eventually died, but it encouraged his interest in food technology. He also worked at a grocery store when he was young. Moore went on to attend Massachusetts State College, earning a bachelor, masters, and finally a doctorate in food technology in 1942.

After graduating from college, Moore joined the Florida Citrus Commission where he joined the research team of Dr. Louis G. MacDowell and Cedric "C.D." Atkins. They were assigned to find a viable form of an orange juice concentrate that could deliver Vitamin C to soldiers in Europe to help fight scurvy. They were given $8,000, equipment with the sophistication of a high school chemistry lab, and assigned to an old USDA lab in Winter Haven, Florida. Their research would also be of benefit to the citrus industry in Florida.

=== Project ===
The research started in 1942 and it took three years for MacDowell, Moore and Atkins to perfect a method of producing frozen concentrated orange juice that is still utilized today. The process of concentration that was previously being used involved heating the juice so that the water would evaporate. The three researchers invented a process called the cutback process, in which the flavor of orange juice was retained by adding a bit of fresh juice to the concentrate and then freezing it. This new process restored some of the Vitamin C that was lost in heating, thereby creating a more nutritious product. The process helped accelerate the growth of citrus production in Florida and helped create the frozen food industry.

== After the project ==
Moore went to the Citrus Research Center in Lake Alfred to enhance commercial evaporation methods and also studied the chemical characteristics of the new juice. A patent was awarded in 1948 on the process they developed, but it was claimed by the USDA, which cited the use of its facilities. Moore's work on the project helped establish minimum quality standards for frozen concentrated orange juice.

Moore was also a participant in studies at the Lake Alfred research center and was considered the world's leading expert in the vitamin and nutrient content of citrus. He also worked to develop more energy-efficient equipment, in pollution control, in waste disposal, and the use of citrus by-products. Moore's research career lasted into his eighties. He finally retired in 2001 and moved to Lake Alfred where he died on July 10, 2009.

=== Awards and accolades ===
Moore earned several awards and accolades, including:

- Distinguished Service Award from the U.S.D.A (along with MacDowell and Atkins)
- Named one of the 50 most important Floridians of the century by the Lakeland Ledger.
- Distinguished Merit Award from the National Wholesale Frozen Food Distributor Association.
- Florida Agricultural Hall of Fame (inducted in 1986).
- Florida Citrus Hall of Fame (inducted in 1983).

== Image and caption ==
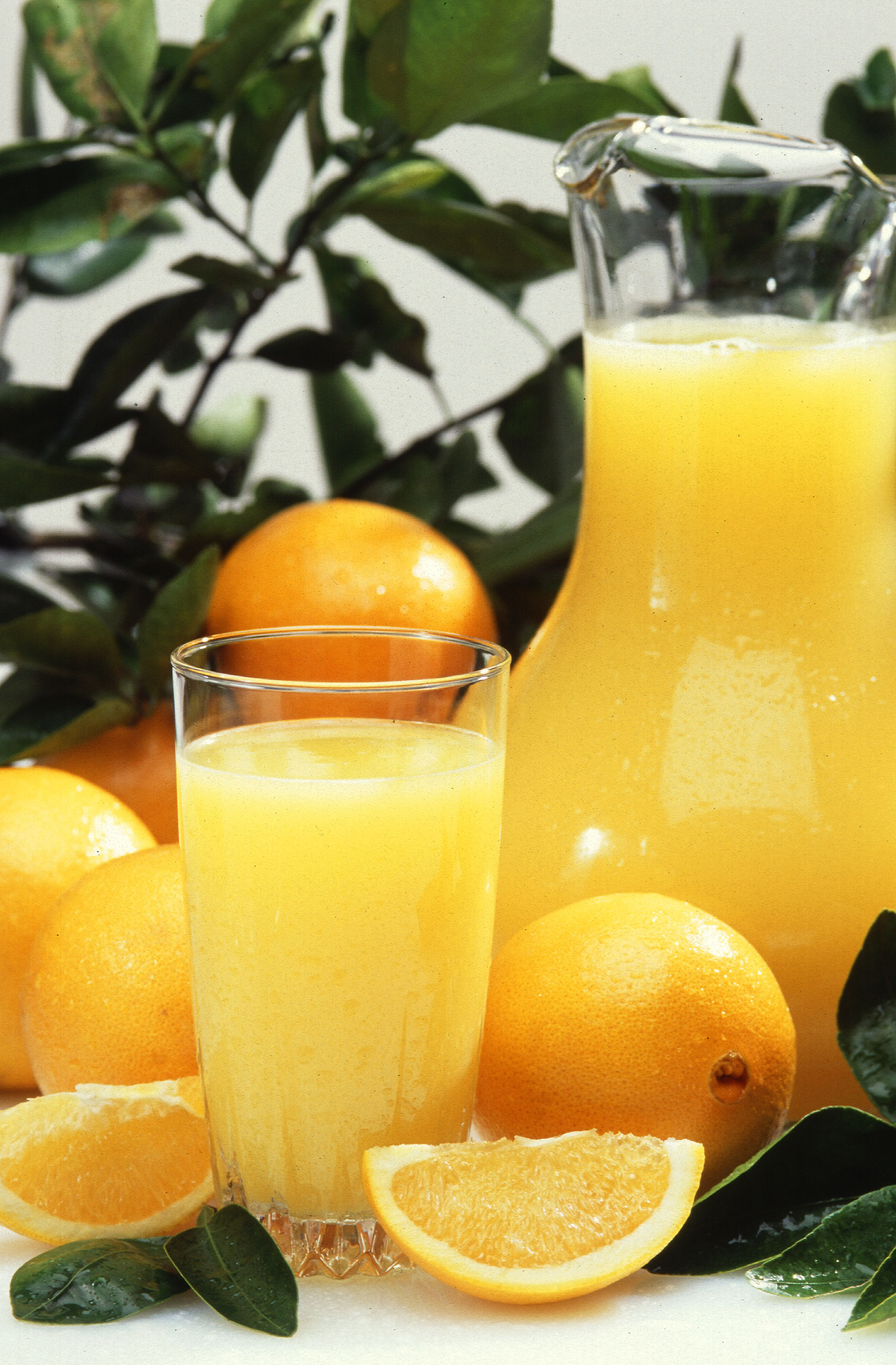

Original caption of image: In the 1940s, frozen orange juice was just a flavorless commercial flop. The only orange juice you could get back then was either squeezed from fresh oranges, mixed from a relatively tasteless concentrate, or poured from a can-and it tasted like a can! All this at a time when lots of good Florida oranges were going to waste. 80 years ago, Louis G. MacDowell, director of research for the Florida Citrus Commission, had an idea. He suggested that adding a little single-strength fresh juice, or "cut-back," to slightly overconcentrated orange juice might restore the flavor and aroma lost during vacuum evaporation. He took the idea to USDA researchers, the folks with the equipment and expertise to help develop the idea. Not only did it work but the vastly improved concentrate could be easily frozen. And so began the success story that's now such a familiar sight on the breakfast table-frozen concentrated orange juice.

== See also ==
- Orange juice
- Orange (fruit)
- Juice
- Food grading
