= Lake Alfred, Florida =

- City
- City of Lake Alfred
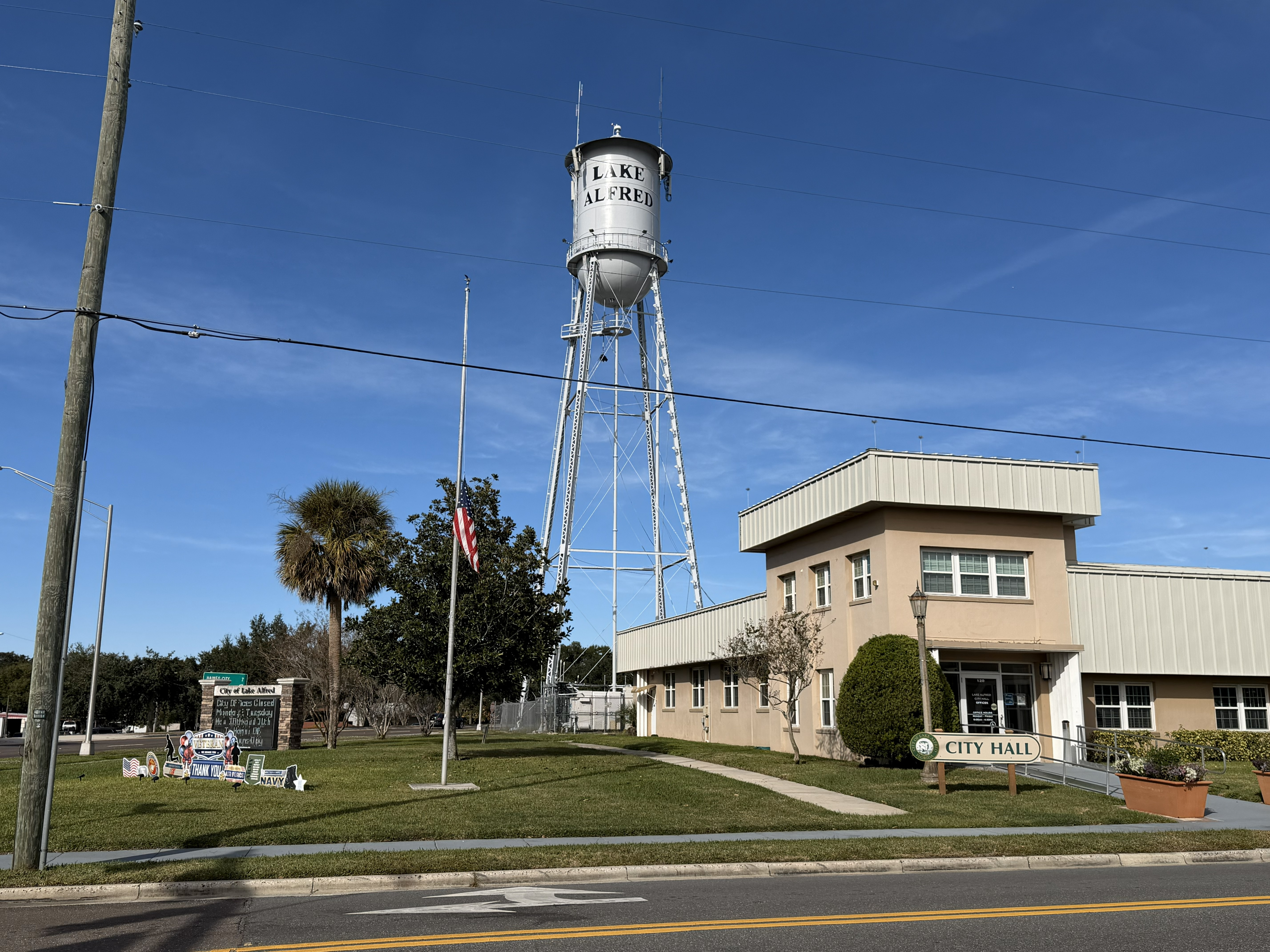
- The Lake Alfred City Hall with the Downtown Water Tower in the background, in 2025.

- Seal

- Location in Polk County and the state of Florida
- Coordinates: 28°06′15″N 81°43′35″W
- Country: United States
- State: Florida
- County: Polk
- Incorporated: 1915

Area
  - Total: 13.10 sq mi (33.93 km^{2})
  - Land: 9.20 sq mi (23.82 km^{2})
  - Water: 3.90 sq mi (10.10 km^{2})
- Elevation: 131 ft (40 m)

Population (2020)
  - Total: 6,374
  - Density: 692.9/sq mi (267.54/km^{2})
- Time zone: UTC-5 (Eastern (EST))
  - Summer (DST): UTC-4 (EDT)
- ZIP code: 33850
- Area code: 863
- FIPS code: 12-37525
- GNIS feature ID: 2404856
- Website: mylakealfred.com

Lake Alfred is a city in Polk County, Florida, United States. It is part of the Lakeland–Winter Haven Metropolitan Statistical Area. The population was approximately 6,374 at the 2020 US census.

== History ==
The city was established soon after the South Florida Railroad reached the area in 1883. It had a number of early names, including Fargo, Chubb and Bartow Junction.

The settlement was named Fargo by snowbirds escaping the cold of Fargo, North Dakota. They at first named the settlement after their hometown, but the United States Postal Service protested after a series of mix-ups with the town of Largo. The town then became Chubb and later Bartow Junction because it lay at the junction of a railroad leading south into the county seat Bartow.

The name Lake Alfred was adopted in 1913 and was taken from the nearest large lake, named after Alfred Parslow, who came to Florida in 1877 and obtained a charter to build the Jacksonville, Tampa and Key West Railroad.

In 1917, the State of Florida established the first off-campus center for the University of Florida in Lake Alfred, the Citrus Experiment Station to study ways of improving citrus growing. Today this location is known as the UF/IFAS Citrus Research and Education Center.

== Geography and climate ==
Lake Alfred is located within the Central Florida Highlands area of the Atlantic coastal plain with a terrain consisting of flatland interspersed with gently rolling hills.

According to the United States Census Bureau, the city has a total area of 8.6 square miles (22 km^{2}), of which 4.9 square miles (13 km^{2}) is land and 3.7 square miles (9.6 km^{2}) (42.84%) is water.

Lake Alfred is located in the humid subtropical zone, as designated by the (Köppen climate classification: Cfa).

== Demographics ==
Historical population
Census	Pop.	Note	%±
1920	317		—
1930	629		98.4%
1940	920		46.3%
1950	1,270		38.0%
1960	2,191		72.5%
1970	2,847		29.9%
1980	3,134		10.1%
1990	3,622		15.6%
2000	3,890		7.4%
2010	5,015		28.9%
2020	6,374		27.1%
U.S. Decennial Census

=== Racial and ethnic composition ===
Lake Alfred racial composition (Hispanics excluded from racial categories) (NH = Non-Hispanic)
Race	Pop 2010	Pop 2020	% 2010	% 2020
White (NH)	3,165	3,177	63.11%	49.84%
Black or African American (NH)	854	1,027	17.03%	16.11%
Native American or Alaska Native (NH)	12	20	0.24%	0.31%
Asian (NH)	85	122	1.69%	1.91%
Pacific Islander or Native Hawaiian (NH)	0	7	0.00%	0.11%
Some other race (NH)	20	41	0.40%	0.64%
Two or more races/Multiracial (NH)	76	216	1.52%	3.39%
Hispanic or Latino (any race)	803	1,764	16.01%	27.67%
Total	5,015	6,374		

=== 2020 census ===
As of the 2020 census, Lake Alfred had a population of 6,374. The median age was 39.3 years. 24.6% of residents were under the age of 18 and 19.4% of residents were 65 years of age or older. For every 100 females there were 94.6 males, and for every 100 females age 18 and over there were 91.1 males age 18 and over.

92.7% of residents lived in urban areas, while 7.3% lived in rural areas.

There were 2,273 households in Lake Alfred, of which 37.3% had children under the age of 18 living in them. Of all households, 52.8% were married-couple households, 15.3% were households with a male householder and no spouse or partner present, and 23.6% were households with a female householder and no spouse or partner present. About 19.2% of all households were made up of individuals and 9.3% had someone living alone who was 65 years of age or older. A 2020 ACS 5-year estimate reported 1,493 families residing in the city.

There were 2,514 housing units, of which 9.6% were vacant. The homeowner vacancy rate was 1.0% and the rental vacancy rate was 5.0%.

=== 2010 census ===
As of the 2010 United States census, there were 5,015 people, 1,839 households, and 1,372 families residing in the city.

=== 2000 census ===
As of the census of 2000, there were 3,890 people, 1,511 households, and 1,103 families residing in the city. The population density was 793.6 inhabitants per square mile (306.4/km^{2}). There were 1,741 housing units at an average density of 355.2 per square mile (137.1/km^{2}). The racial makeup of the city was 78.25% White, 17.25% African American, 0.23% Native American, 0.80% Asian, 1.72% from other races, and 1.75% from two or more races. Hispanic or Latino of any race were 5.89% of the population.

In 2000, there were 1,511 households, out of which 32.0% had children under the age of 18 living with them, 55.0% were married couples living together, 14.7% had a female householder with no husband present, and 27.0% were non-families. 22.1% of all households were made up of individuals, and 10.2% had someone living alone who was 65 years of age or older. The average household size was 2.54 and the average family size was 2.98.

In 2000, in the city, the population was spread out, with 26.5% under the age of 18, 7.1% from 18 to 24, 27.2% from 25 to 44, 22.1% from 45 to 64, and 17.0% who were 65 years of age or older. The median age was 38 years. For every 100 females, there were 87.1 males. For every 100 females age 18 and over, there were 83.9 males.

In 2000, the median income for a household in the city was $36,809, and the median income for a family was $42,904. Males had a median income of $31,875 versus $20,445 for females. The per capita income for the city was $18,008. About 10.7% of families and 14.0% of the population were below the poverty line, including 24.1% of those under age 18 and 7.4% of those age 65 or over.

== Transportation ==
=== Highways ===
- US 17 / US 92 – Lake Alfred lies near the western end of the concurrency between US 17 and US 92. The concurrency of US 17/92 leads eastward to Haines City and further toward Kissimmee; US 17 leads southward to Winter Haven; and US 92, westward to Auburndale and further to Lakeland.
- CR 557 – Leads northward to I-4 and toward Polk City

=== Mass transit ===
The city is served by buses of Winter Haven Area Transit, primarily the Route #15 bus.

Railroads played a role in the development in the history of the Lake Alfred. The city is currently served by the CSX Carters Subdivision, which was previously part of the Main Line of the Atlantic Coast Line Railroad. Amtrak uses the line but does not stop in the city. At one time the city served as the junction of the ACL Bartow Branch.

=== Airports ===
Two airports serve Lake Alfred, both of which are located in Winter Haven, west of the city. The Winter Haven Regional Airport along US 92 and the adjacent Jack Browns Seaplane Base located on the northeast shores of Lake Jessie.

== Government and infrastructure ==
The Florida Department of Citrus has its department of scientific research in Lake Alfred.

== Lake Alfred Public Library ==
Lake Alfred Public Library was started in 1962 by the Junior Women's Club. It was housed in the Dees Building on West Haines Blvd. 1000 books were donated by Lake Alfred residents and merchants. The books were also processed by volunteers. Merchant W.R. Dees provided the storefront requiring a low enough rent that the Junior Women's Club could pay. The club also held bake sales, rummage sales, and dances to raise money to provide for material needs such as furniture. The grand opening was October 1962. Within a year a larger storefront opened in the same building and volunteers once again moved the library. Volunteers ran the library causing for unpredictable hours in which the library was open. Sometimes it was only open 3 hours a week. In 1967, the city provided a small house in Lion's Park for the growing library to move to, and in 1969, the city hired a part-time professional librarian, and funded new books and supplies. In 1972, the City of Lake Alfred created a library board made up of seven members appointed by the city commission and city manager. It was not until 1973 that Lake Alfred took over the ownership and responsibility for the Lake Alfred Public Library. It was moved to the new Public Safety building on Pomelo Street with the library in between the police and fire department. In 2012, the library moved to a new building on North Seminole Avenue after the Friends of the Library group received money bequeathed by Florida Citrus Hall of Fame member, Edwin Moore,. The library is part of the Polk County Library cooperative. The library offers wireless printing, technology classes, print and e-books, WiFi, and children's programming The library is located at 245 N. Seminole Ave. Lake Alfred, Florida 33850.

== Gallery ==
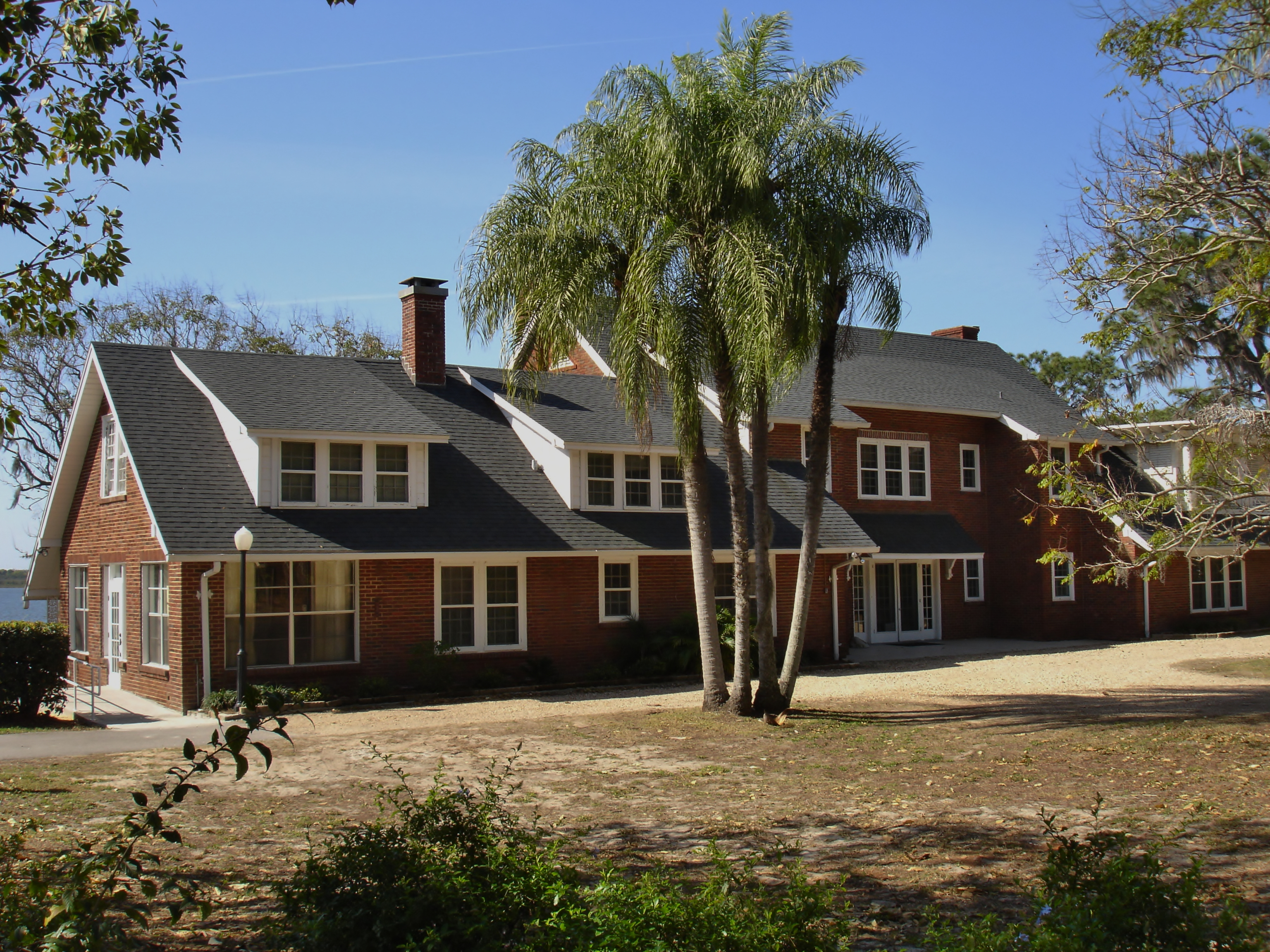
Mansion at Mackay Gardens & Lakeside Preserve

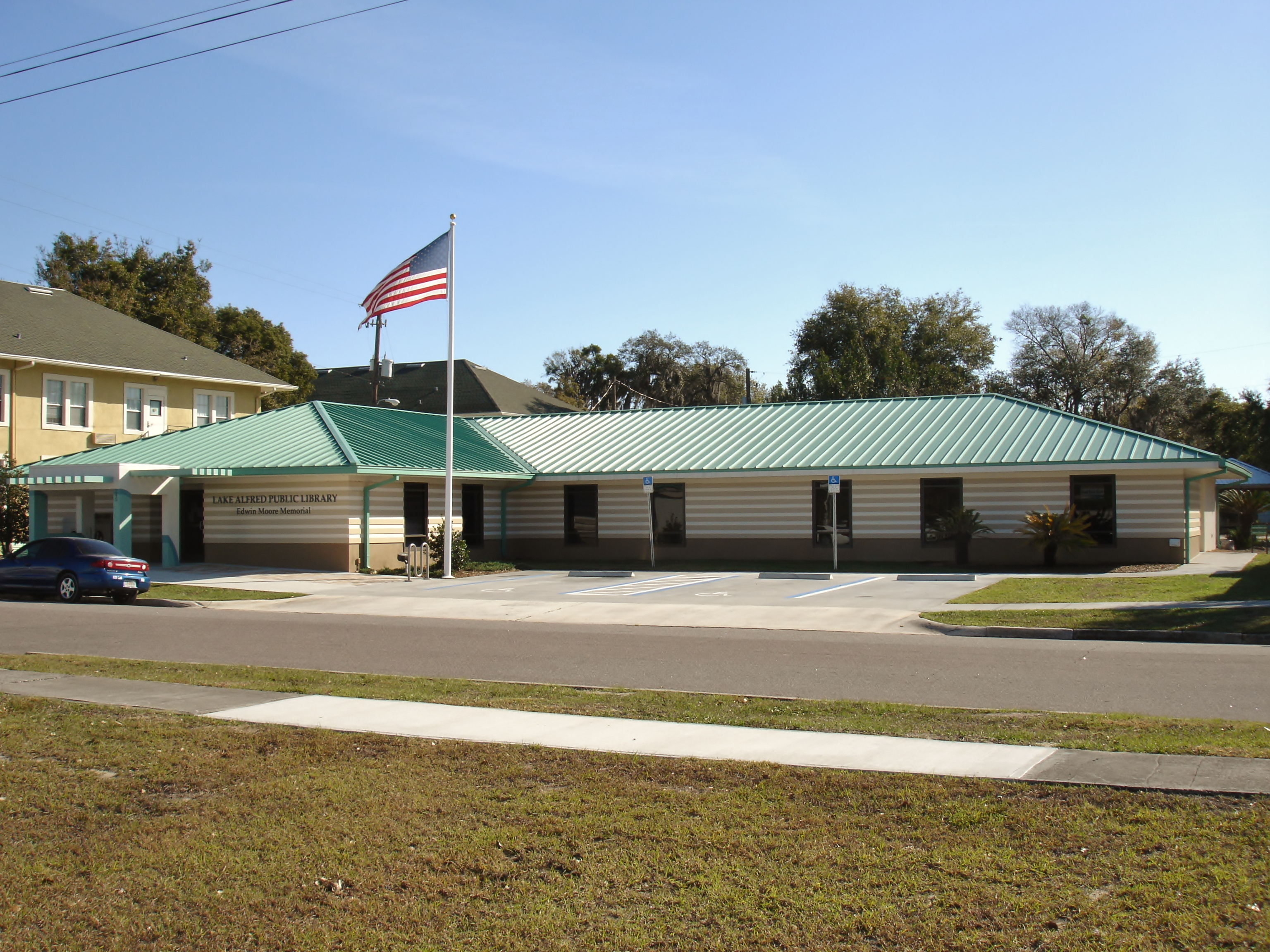
Lake Alfred Public Library

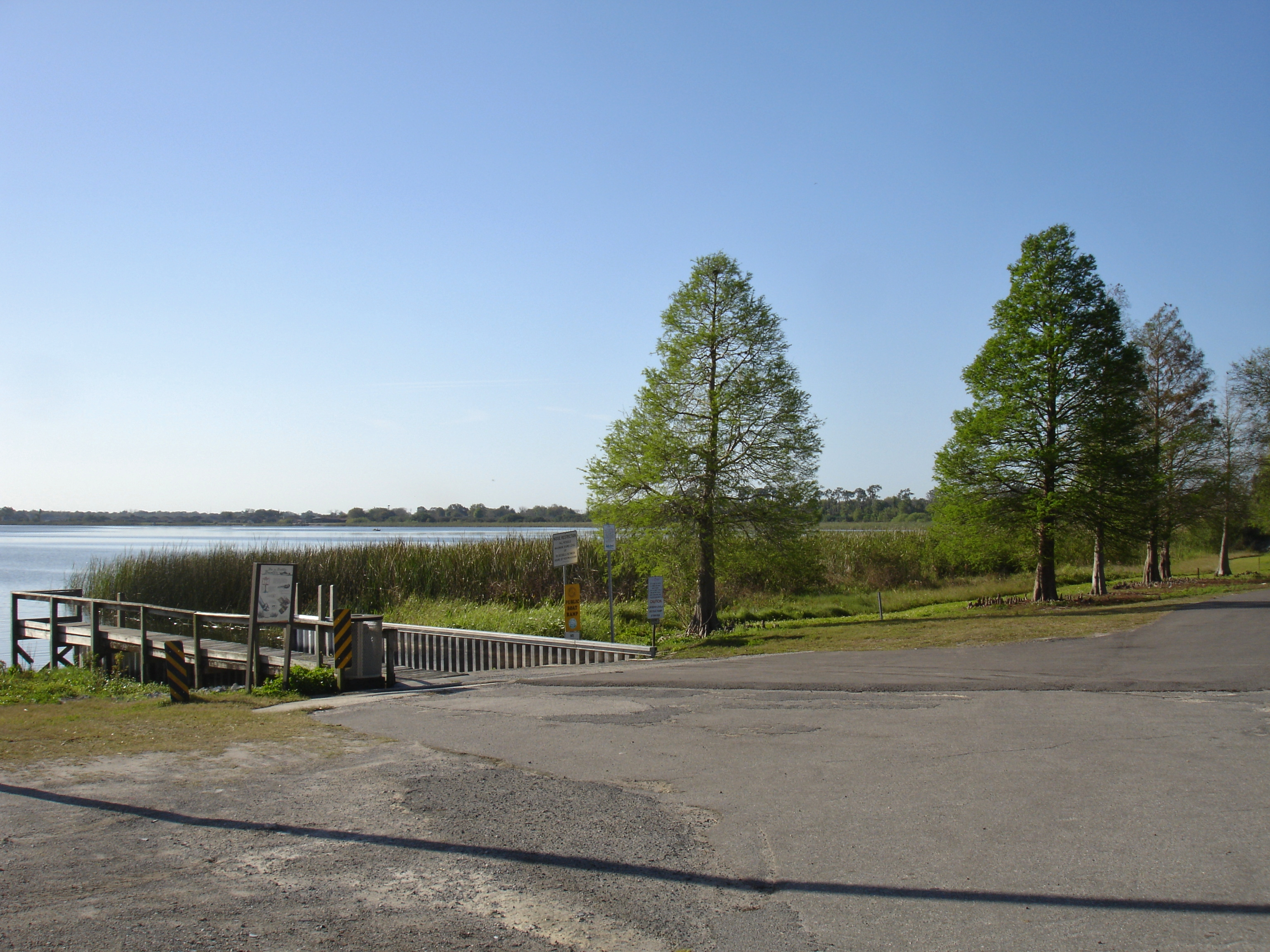
Lake Rochelle boat ramp

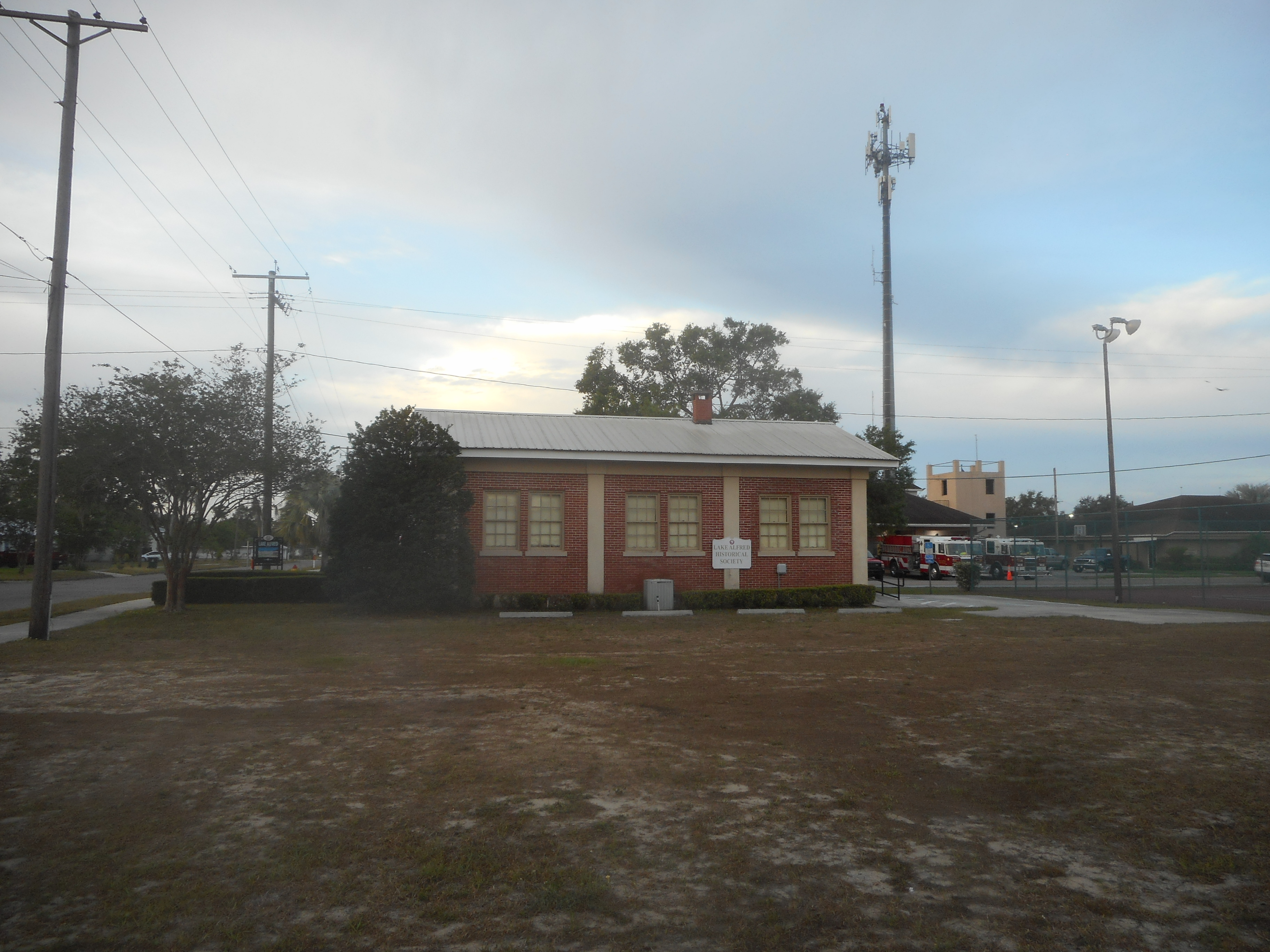
Lake Alfred Historical Society

== Notable people ==
- Dawayne Bryan, racing driver
- Ahmed Johnson, professional wrestler
- Manisha Singh, attorney and Assistant Secretary of State for Economic and Business Affairs
