= Drammen og Omegn Busslinjer =

Norwegian bus company

Drammen og Omegn Busslinjer AS
- Company type: Municipally owned
- Industry: Transport
- Founded: 1981; 45 years ago
- Defunct: 1999
- Headquarters: Drammen, Norway
- Area served: Buskerud, Norway
- Number of employees: 180 (1999)
- Parent: County of Buskerud; City of Drammen; Municipality of Lier; Municipality of Nedre Eiker

Drammen og Omegn Busslinjer AS was a Norwegian bus company operating in Greater Drammen until 1999 when it was sold to Nettbuss because of financial difficulties and renamed Nettbuss Drammen. The company was owned by the municipalities of Drammen, Lier and Nedre Eiker in addition to the county of Buskerud. At the time of the sale the company had 180 employees.
