= April 1916 =

Month in 1916

<<	April 1916					>>
Su	Mo	Tu	We	Th	Fr	Sa
						1
2	3	4	5	6	7	8
9	10	11	12	13	14	15
16	17	18	19	20	21	22
23	24	25	26	27	28	29
30

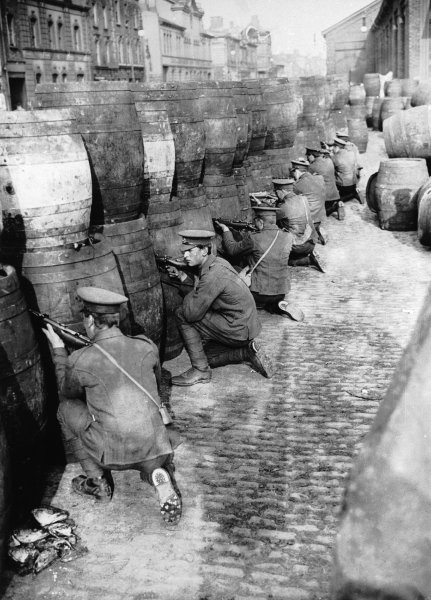
British soldiers in position behind a stack of barrels during the Easter Rising in Dublin.

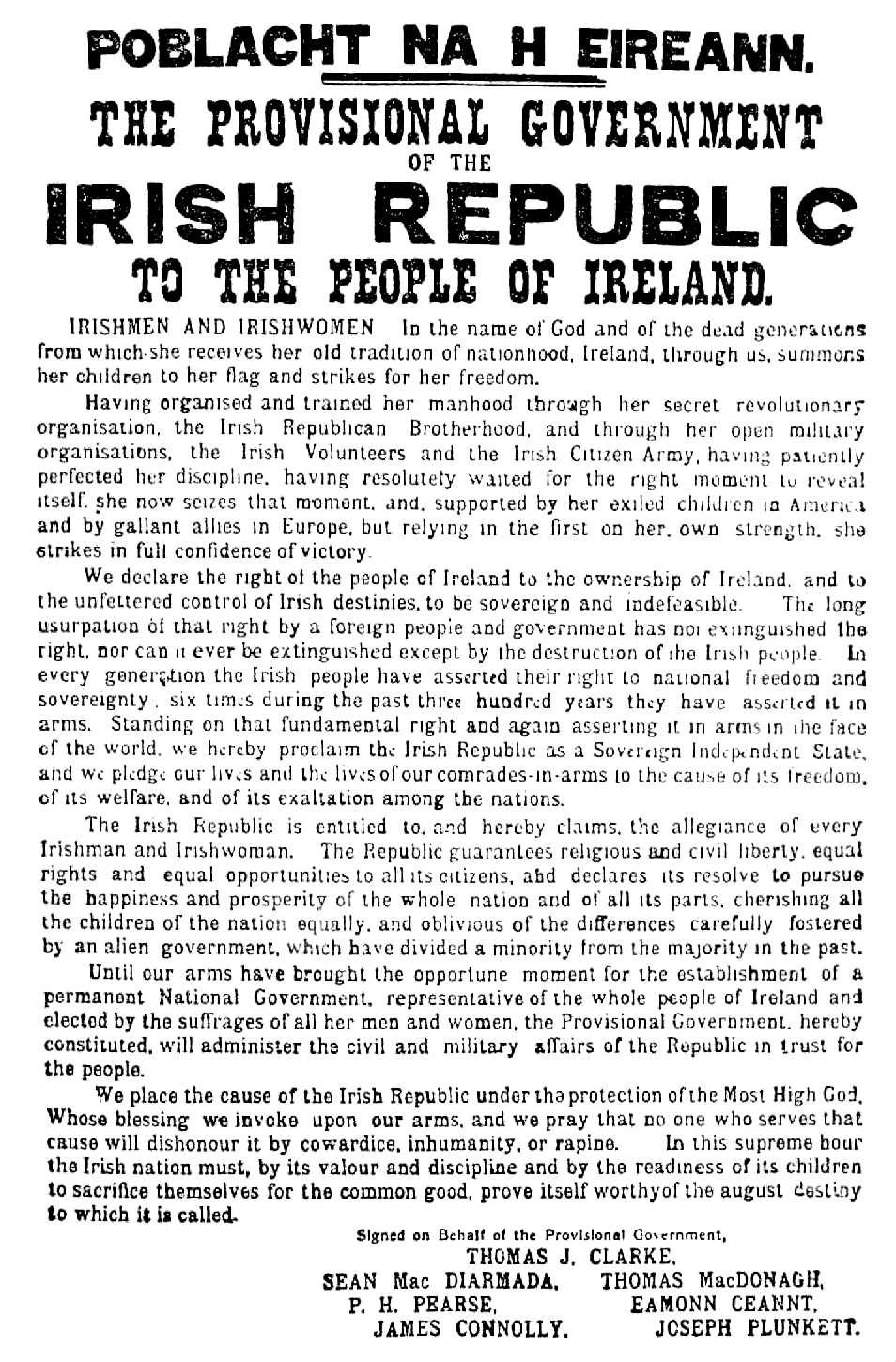
Proclamation of the Republic, Easter 1916.

The following events occurred in April 1916:

== April 1, 1916 (Saturday) ==
- Lieutenant General Hubert Gough took command of the British Reserve Army, which would see action at the Battle of the Somme.
- German Navy airships raided England for five more nights straight.
- Gabrielle Petit, a 23-year old Belgian citizen, was executed by firing squad after being arrested and charged for spying on occupying Germans for British intelligence. She became a national hero after the end of World War I.
- The Royal Flying Corps established the No. 38 and No. 42 Squadrons.
- The 42nd Indian Brigade was established to serve in the Mesopotamian campaign.
- The Royal Naval Air Service Training Establishment was founded at Cranwell, Lincolnshire, England. It later will become RAF Cranwell.
- United States Coast Guard Third Lieutenant Elmer Fowler Stone began flight training at Naval Air Station Pensacola in Pensacola, Florida, becoming the first U.S. Coast Guard aviator.
- Tohoku University established the Provisional Institute of Physical and Chemical Research in Sendai, Japan. The research institute became the Institute for Materials Research, the leading international center on materials research.
- Died:
  - James Burrill Angell, 87, American academic, president of the University of Michigan from 1871 to 1909 (b. 1829)
  - Charles Aurelius Smith, 55, American politician, 91st Governor of South Carolina, holding the shortest term in that position for a period of only five days as interim until Richard Manning was inaugurated (b. 1861)

== April 2, 1916 (Sunday) ==
- A munitions factory exploded at Uplees near Faversham, Kent, England, killing 108 workers.
- At the Hawk's Well, a play written by W. B. Yeats, was first performed privately in London.

== April 3, 1916 (Monday) ==
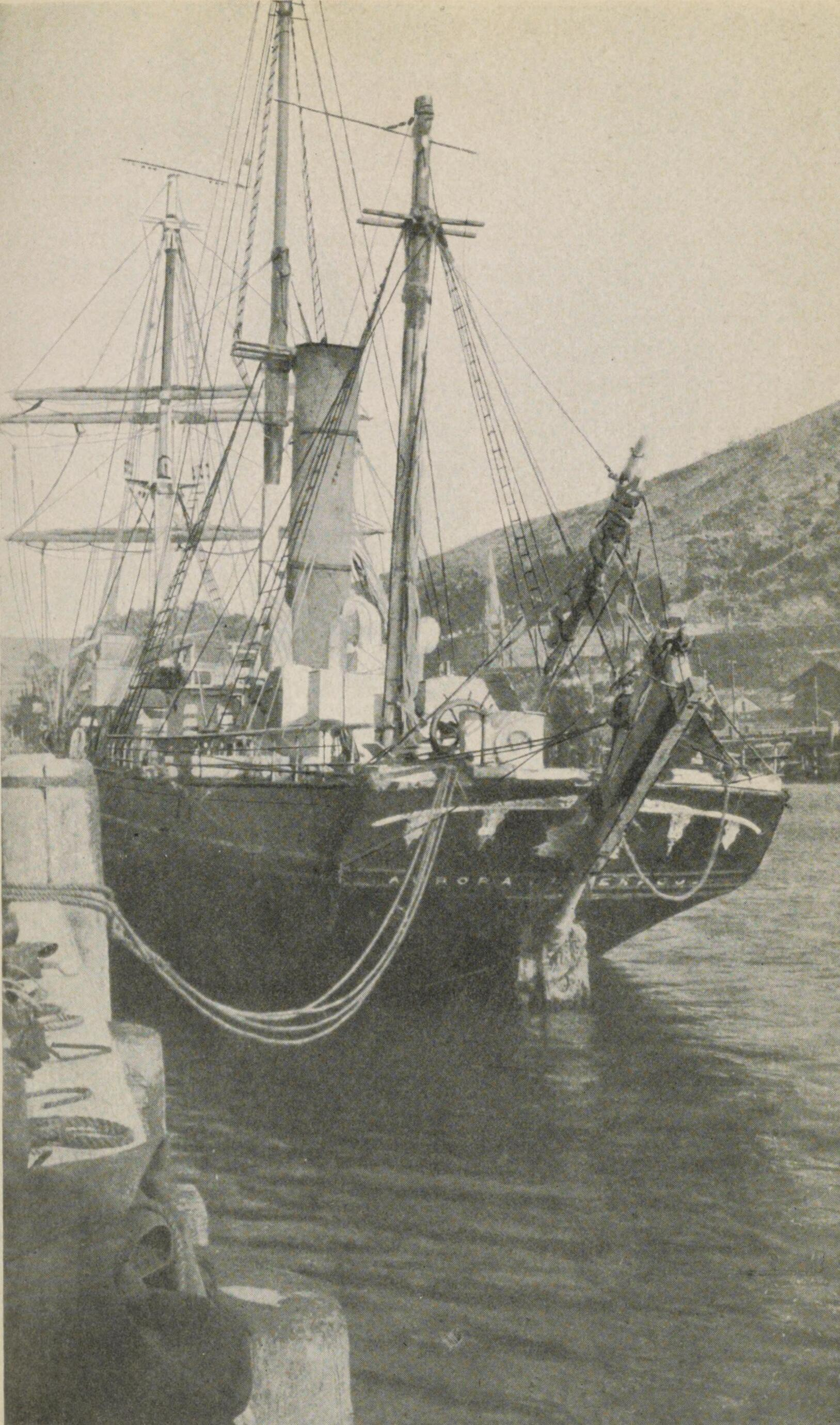
British polar ship Aurora arrived in New Zealand after drifting for 312 days.

- Actions of St Eloi Craters – British forces captured some of the remaining craters created by detonating explosives in tunnels underneath the German front-line trenches as St Eloi, Belgium.
- Anglo-Egyptian Darfur Expedition – Anglo-Egyptian scouting forces sent to the Sultanate of Darfur (now Sudan) to quell a rebellion led by Sultan Ali Dinar began clearing local Sudanese warriors out of villages surrounding Jebel el Hella, where the main column was headquartered, to make it safer to build a road for supply trucks to use and replenish the column.
- Ross Sea party – British polar exploration ship Aurora was brought into harbor at Port Chalmers, New Zealand tugboat Dunedin.
- The ANZAC Provost Corps were established, the precursor to the Royal Australian Corps of Military Police.
- The Roman Catholic Diocese of Penedo was established in Penedo, Brazil.
- Born: Herb Caen, American journalist, recipient of the special Pulitzer Prize for his daily column with the San Francisco Chronicle; as Herbert Eugene Caen, in Sacramento, California, United States (d. 1997)

== April 4, 1916 (Tuesday) ==
- Battle of Verdun – The French were able to add reserve troops and equipment to their front line against attacks by the German Fifth Army. Artillery barrages increased casualties on both sides and slowed German front-line attacks to local assault by mid-month.
- Actions of St Eloi Craters — Canadian forces relieved many of the units defending the craters created by Allied bombing in Belgium.
- Born: Mickey Owen, American baseball player, catcher for the St. Louis Cardinals, Brooklyn Dodgers, Chicago Cubs and Boston Red Sox from 1937 to 1954; as Arnold Malcolm Owen, in Nixa, Missouri, United States (d. 2005)

== April 5, 1916 (Wednesday) ==
- Siege of Kut – A British relief force of 30,000 under General G. F. Gorringe captured Fallahiyeh in what is now western Iran suffered heavy losses and Ottoman reinforcements entered Mesopotamia.
- Actions of St Eloi Craters – The Germans launched a night attack on the craters at St. Eloi, Belgium and recovered all the ground lost to the British on March 27.
- Born:
  - Gregory Peck, American actor, renowned for starring roles in Gentleman's Agreement, Roman Holiday, The Guns of Navarone and Cape Fear, recipient of the Academy Award for Best Actor for To Kill a Mockingbird; as Eldred Gregory Peck, in San Diego, United States (d. 2003)
  - Morley Baer, American photographer, best known for his landscape and urban photography of San Francisco and the California coastline; in Toledo, Ohio, United States (d. 1995)
  - Jean Trescases, a French Army Chief warrant officer who fought in various conflicts; in Palalda, France (d.1951)

== April 6, 1916 (Thursday) ==
- Actions of St Eloi Craters – Canadian forces began counterattacks to retake the craters the Germans had overwhelmed just a day before.
- Died: Andrew Ross, 36, Scottish rugby player, forward for the Scotland national rugby union team from 1905 to 1909, as well for Royal High Corstorphine; killed in action at St. Eloi, Belgium) (b. 1879)

== April 7, 1916 (Friday) ==
- A fire during an amateur benefit concert for soldiers at the Garrick Theatre in London killed eight young girls when their costumes were ignited.
- The west coast stagecoach line officially closed with the completion of a railroad between Coos Bay and Reedsport, Oregon.
- Born:
  - Edward L. Loper Sr., American artist, member of the Impressionism movement and emerging art by African Americans; in Wilmington, Delaware, United States (d. 2011)
  - Yoo Youngkuk, Korean artist, co-founder of the Neo Realism Group and Association of Modern Artists in Korea; in Uljin County, Korea, Empire of Japan (present-day South Korea) (d. 2002)

== April 8, 1916 (Saturday) ==
- Anglo-Egyptian Darfur Expedition – Anglo-Egyptian forces occupied the Sudanese town of Abiad after encountering little resistance.
- Imperial Trans-Antarctic Expedition – Members of the expedition team struck the second emergency camp created after the sinking of the polar ship Endurance in November when the solid ice floe began to split apart.

== April 9, 1916 (Sunday) ==
- Imperial Trans-Antarctic Expedition – Members of the polar expedition team began open water travel using the three lifeboats salvaged during the sinking of the polar ship Endurance in November. The three lifeboats were named after the expedition's three chief financial sponsors: James Caird, Dudley Docker and Stancomb Wills.
- Born:
  - Elliot Handler, American inventor, co-founder of Mattel with wife Ruth Handler which produced popular toys as Barbie and Hot Wheels; as Isadore Elliot Handler, in Chicago, United States (d. 2011)
  - Léonie Duquet, French nun, disappeared and murdered along with fellow sister Alice Domon by the military regime of Argentine President Jorge Rafael Videla during the Dirty War; in Longemaison, France (d. 1977)
- Died:
  - John Norton, 59, Australian journalist and politician, publisher of the newspaper The Truth, member of the Parliament of New South Wales from 1898 to 1910; died of kidney failure (b. 1858)
  - Wilhelm Sauer, 85, German designer, builder of over 1,100 pipe organs including those at Bremen Cathedral, St. Thomas Church in Leipzig, and Berlin Cathedral (b. 1831)

== April 10, 1916 (Monday) ==
- The Professional Golfers' Association of America (PGA) was established with 35 charter members and Robert White as president.
- Died: Henry Marshall Furman, 65, American judge, first judge of the Oklahoma Court of Criminal Appeals (b. 1850)

== April 11, 1916 (Tuesday) ==
- The Egyptian Expeditionary Force began the Sinai and Palestine campaign by raiding Jifjafa and destroying water wells in the Sinai desert.
- Battle of Verdun – France counter-attacked German-held positions at Douaumont and Vaux, France.
- The Kia Kima Scout Reservation, a summer camp for the Boy Scouts of America, was established outside of Hardy, Arkansas.
- Born: Sam Chapman, American baseball player, center fielder for the Philadelphia Athletics from 1938 to 1951; as Samuel Blake Chapman, in Tiburon, California, United States (d. 2006)
- Died: Richard Harding Davis, 51, American war journalist, known for coverage of the Spanish–American War, the Second Boer War, and World War I; died of a heart attack (b. 1864)

== April 12, 1916 (Wednesday) ==
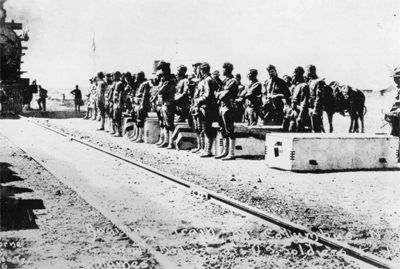
Men of the 13th Cavalry Regiment at a train station in Columbus, New Mexico, en route to Mexico for the Pancho Villa Expedition.

- Battle of Parral – The 13th Cavalry Regiment under command of Major Frank Tompkins fought soldiers loyal to Venustiano Carranza at Parral, Chihuahua. The U.S. Cavalry unit of 150 men was in the country on the hunt for Pancho Villa following his raid on Columbus, New Mexico, when it encountered the Mexican cavalry force of 550 men. The skirmish resulted in an estimated 45 Mexican deaths and five American deaths before reinforcement forced the Mexicans to retreat. The battle marked the furthest U.S. forces moved into Mexico.
- Imperial Trans-Antarctic Expedition – Expedition leader Ernest Shackleton chose the three lifeboats the party used to cross open water in the Weddell Sea to head for Hope Bay, located at the northern tip of the Antarctic Peninsula.
- Born:
  - Beverly Cleary, American children's writer, author of Ramona and Her Mother and Dear Mr. Henshaw; as Beverly Atlee Bunn, in McMinnville, Oregon, United States (d. 2021)
  - Benjamin Libet, American psychologist, leading researcher in the field of human consciousness; in Chicago, United States (d. 2007)
  - John Verdun Newton, Australian politician and air force officer, member of the Royal Australian Air Force and elected member of the Western Australian Legislative Assembly for 55 days before being killed in action during World War II; in Dongara, Western Australia, Australia (killed in action, 1944)
  - Martin Becker, German bomber fighter pilot, member of the night fighter squadron for the Luftwaffe during World War II, recipient of the Knight's Cross of the Iron Cross; in Wiesbaden, German Empire (present-day Germany) (d. 2006)

== April 13, 1916 (Thursday) ==
- Oris Paxton Van Sweringen and his younger brother Mantis purchased a 75% controlling interest in the Nickel Plate Road from William Kissam Vanderbilt for $8.5 million.
- Born: Phyllis Fraser, American publisher, co-founder of Beginner Books for children with The Cat in the Hat by Dr. Seuss being their first publication; as Helen Brown Nichols, in Kansas City, Missouri, United States (d. 2006)

== April 14, 1916 (Friday) ==
- Anglo-Egyptian Darfur Expedition – Reconnaissance forces left behind in Abiad repelled attacks by Sudanese rebels over a 48-hour period, though casualties were unknown.
- The Imperial German Army established the High Command of Coastal Defence to protect the German northern coast from attack.
- German battle cruiser SMS Nürnberg was launched at AG Weser shipyard in Bremen. It would participate in the Second Battle of Heligoland Bight in 1917 and was nearly scuttled in Scapa Flow. It was claimed by the Royal Navy and sunk during military practice maneuvers in 1922.
- Born:
  - Abdul Rahman Arif, Iraqi state leader, third President of Iraq; as Abdul Rahman Mohammed ʿArif al-Jumayli, in Baghdad, Ottoman Empire (present-day Iraq) (d. 2007)
  - Lawrence Hogben, New Zealand naval officer, recipient of the Distinguished Service Cross and the Bronze Star Medal for his role in the hunt for the Bismarck in 1941 and during the Battle of the Barents Sea in 1942; in Auckland, New Zealand (d. 2015)
- Died: Gina Krog, 68, Norwegian suffragist, founder of the Norwegian Association for Women's Rights; died of influenza (b. 1847)

== April 15, 1916 (Saturday) ==
Ernest Shackleton and his party arrived at Elephant Island to set up a new camp for the shipwrecked expedition party in the Antarctic.

- Trebizond Campaign – The Ottoman Empire abandoned the port of Trabzon, Turkey to Russia after a two-and-half-month siege. About 500 Armenians out of the original 30,000 that had been deported out of the city during the Armenian genocide returned, and the Kaymaklı Monastery was reestablished.
- The first air supply drop was conducted by the No. 30 Squadron of the Royal Flying Corps as their aircraft delivered 13 tons of supplies into Kut, Mesopotamia (now Iraq) while it was besieged by the Ottoman Empire (although some accounts criticized the drops for often ending up in either the Tigris or into Ottoman hands)
- Imperial Trans-Antarctic Expedition – The shipwrecked British polar expedition party landed on the eastern side of Elephant Island in the Weddell Sea and after a day of scouting found a new long-term camp.
- John Anderson was appointed to become the 22nd Governor of Ceylon.
- Royal Flying Corps established No. 37, No. 39, No. 43, and No. 48 Squadrons.
- Margaret Haley established the American Federation of Teachers in Chicago and was its first president.
- Born:
  - Lem Billings, American socialite, close friend to John F. Kennedy and co-manager of the Kennedy family trust funds with Sargent Shriver; as Kirk LeMoyne Billings, in Pittsburgh, United States (d. 1981)
  - Mikiel Fsadni, Maltese friar and historian; in Birgu, Crown Colony of Malta (present-day Malta) (d. 2013)
  - Johnny Hutchings, American baseball player, relief pitcher for the Cincinnati Reds and Boston Braves from 1940 to 1946, 1940 World Series champion; as John Richard Joseph Hutchings, in Chicago, United States (d. 1963)

== April 16, 1916 (Sunday) ==
- Siege of Kut – British forces captured Beit Asia Mesopotamia in an attempt to relieve British Indian soldiers at Kut.
- Actions of St Eloi Craters – Air reconnaissance spotted the Germans had rebuilt much of their front trench line west of the craters, forcing the British and Canadian forces to call off counterattacks and to consolidate defenses.
- Mexican revolutionary leader Amador Salazar, major ally and cousin of Emiliano Zapata was killed by a stray bullet while fighting in Tlaltizapán, Mexico.
- Born:
  - Reinhard Suhren, German naval officer, commander of U-564 during World War II, recipient of the Knight's Cross of the Iron Cross; in Bad Schwalbach, German Empire (present-day Germany) (d. 1984)
  - Mary Garber, American sports journalist, pioneer women writer in sports, and first woman to win the Associated Press Sports Editors Award; in New York City, United States (d. 2008)
- Died:
  - George Wilbur Peck, 75, American politician, 17th Governor of Wisconsin and 9th Mayor of Milwaukee; died of Bright's disease (b. 1840)
  - Tom Horan, 62, Australian cricketer, played for the Victoria cricket team from 1874 to 1891, and for the Australia national cricket team in 1877 and 1885 (b. 1854)

== April 17, 1916 (Monday) ==
- Battle of Verdun – France counter-attacked German-held positions at Meuse and Douaumont, France.
- Siege of Kut – The British captured Biet Asia and moved on to neighboring Sannaiyat in Mesopotamia in a last attempt to rescue the besieged British Indian army at Kut.
- Battle of Kondoa Irangi – A South African force of 3,000 men under command of Jacob van Deventer made contact with German colonial troops at the town of Kondoa Irangi in German East Africa.
- Born:
  - Sirimavo Bandaranaike, Sri Lankan state leader, Prime Minister of Sri Lanka in 1970 to 1977 and 1994 to 2000, first woman to be head of government; as Sirima Ratwatte, in Ratnapura, British Ceylon (present-day Sri Lanka) (d. 2000)
  - Henri Picard, Belgian fighter pilot, member of the 350th Belgium Squadron during World War II and escapee from Stalag Luft III; in Etterbeek, Belgium (executed, 1944)

== April 18, 1916 (Tuesday) ==
- Chippewa leader Rocky Boy died, shortly after negotiating treaties with the U.S. government for Blackfoot tribes in Montana which included the creation of the Rocky Boy's Indian Reservation after his name. Oral tradition among elders suggested Rocky Boy may have been poisoned by rival Cree in the area although the rumors were never substantiated.
- Captain Peter Norman Nissen completed the prototype Nissen hut, which became a standard military structure for barracks or supplies for many military bases.
- The association football club Atlante was established in Mexico City.
- Residents of Dundee Lake, New Jersey, voted to secede from Saddle River to form their own borough known as East Paterson. The borough was renamed Elmwood Park in 1973.
- Born:
  - José Joaquín Trejos Fernández, Costa Rican state leader, 35th President of Costa Rica; in San José, Costa Rica (d. 2010)
  - Carl Burgos, American comic book artist, creator of the original Human Torch; as Max Finkelstein, in New York City, United States (d. 1984)
- Died: G. Subramania Iyer, 61, Indian journalist, first editor and managing director of The Hindu from 1878 to 1898; died of leprosy (b. 1855)

== April 19, 1916 (Wednesday) ==
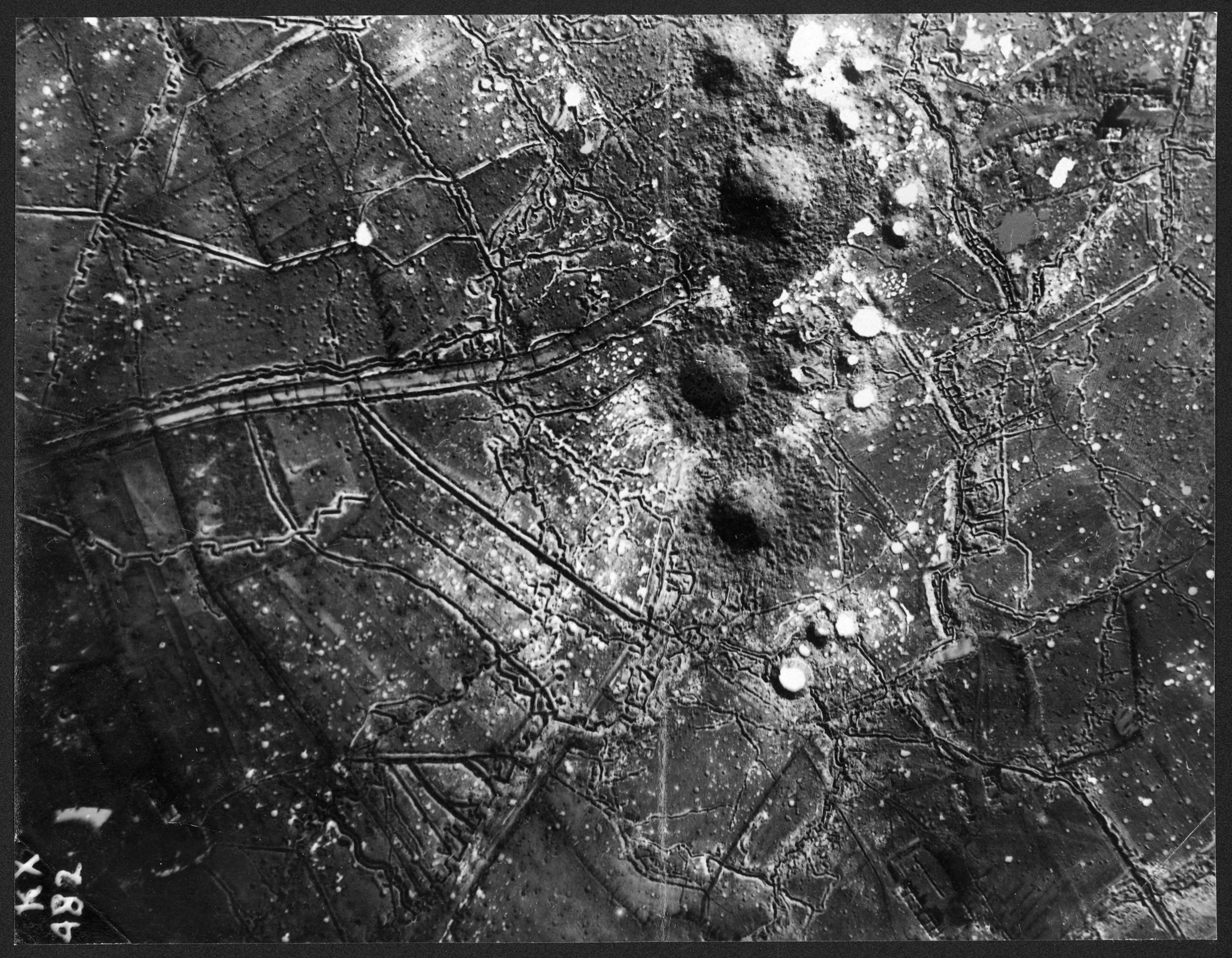
Aerial photo of the mine craters at St. Eloi, Belgium after three weeks of fighting.

- Women were given the right to vote in Alberta, the third Canadian province to do so in Canada.
- Actions of St Eloi Craters – The Germans took the remaining craters abandoned by the British and moved their trench line west of it. Casualties for the action were 2,233 for the British and 1,605 for the Germans.
- Battle of Kondoa Irangi – The South Africans captured Kondoa Irangi in German East Africa from the Germans.
- German Field Marshal Colmar Freiherr von der Goltz, commander of Ottoman forces in Mesopotamia, died suddenly from typhus. Rumors surrounded his death, suggesting he may have been poisoned on secret orders from Ottoman War Minister Enver Pasha for intervening against the Armenian deportation in late 1915 by threatening to resign from his position.
- The Royal Flying Corps established the No. 46 Squadron.
- The musical revue The Bing Boys Are Here premiered at the Alhambra Theatre in West End, London. Starring George Robey, Violet Loraine and Alfred Lester, the show featured the hit "If You Were the Only Girl (In the World)". The popular show ran 378 performances and led to two more popular musical reviews including The Bing Girls are Here and "The Bing Boys on Broadway".
- Died:
  - Wacław Mayzel, 68, Polish biologist, first to describe mitosis in cell division (b. 1847)
  - Arthur Heywood, 66, British noble and inventor, invented a rotating axle that could allow trains to turn on tight curves (b. 1849)

== April 20, 1916 (Thursday) ==
- The Escadrille Américaine ("American Squadron"), later to be known as the Lafayette Escadrille, was deployed as an American volunteer unit in Luxeuil-les-Bains, France, equipped with Nieuport 11 aircraft.
- Royal Navy battlecruiser HMS Glorious was launched by Harland and Wolff at Belfast and served at the Second Battle of Heligoland Bight. It was later rebuilt as an aircraft carrier for World War II when it was sunk by German Navy in 1940.
- Royal Navy destroyer HMS Patriot was launched by John I. Thornycroft & Company in Southampton, England, and would serve out World War I before it was transferred to the Royal Canadian Navy as a training ship.
- The Chicago Cubs played their first game at Weeghman Park (modern-day Wrigley Field), defeating the Cincinnati Reds 7–6 in 11 innings.
- Samuel Goldwyn founded Goldwyn Pictures with Broadway partners Edgar and Archibald Selwyn but the movie production company folded within eight years.
- Born: Emil Kapaun, American clergy, chaplain for the United States Army during World War II and the Korean War, ninth chaplain to receive the Medal of Honor; in Pilsen, Kansas, United States (d. 1951, in a Chinese POW camp)

== April 21, 1916 (Friday) ==
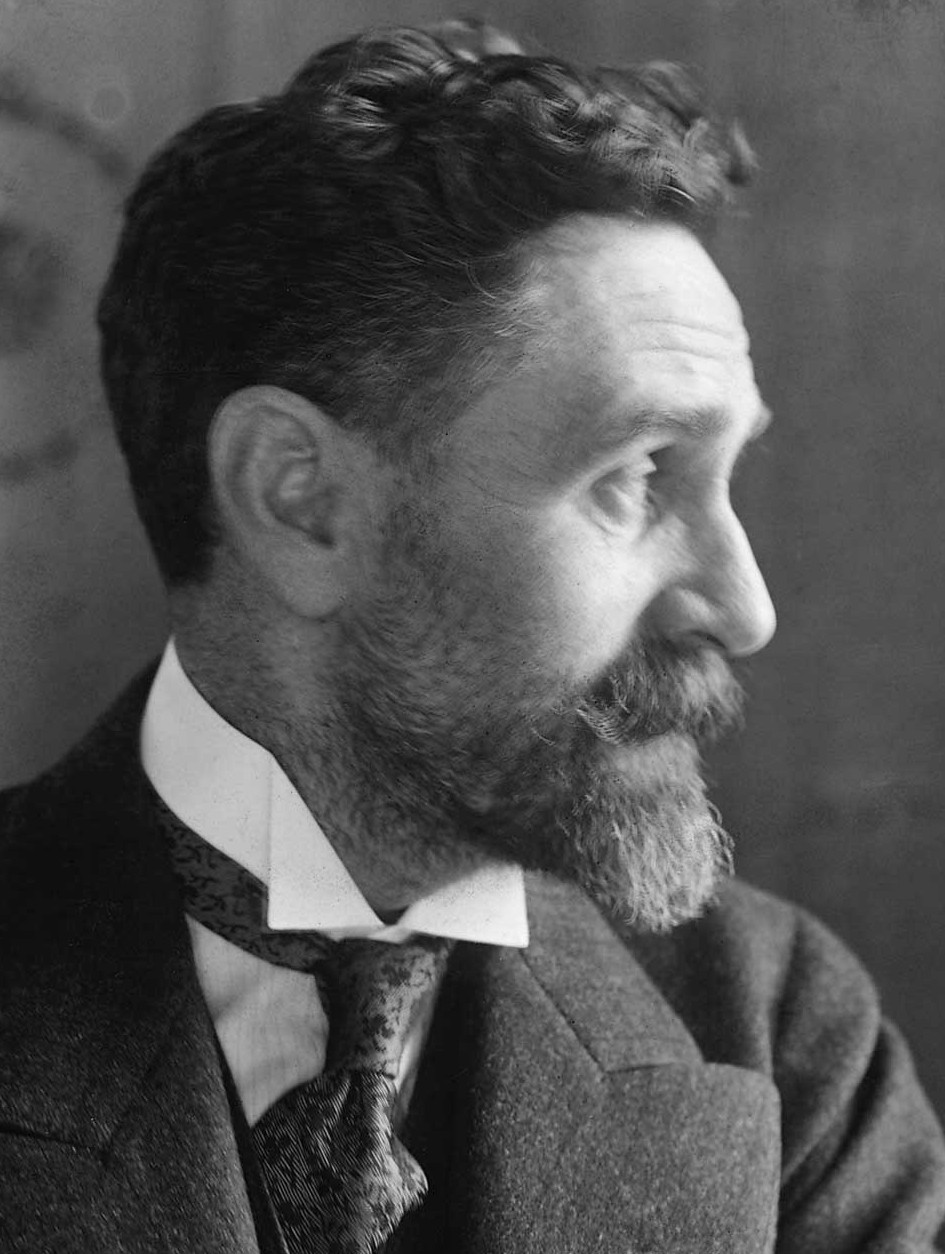
Irish nationalist Roger Casement was arrested for smuggling weapons to the Easter Rising in Dublin.

- Easter Rising – The German-controlled cargo steamer SS Libau, masquerading as SS Aud, was intercepted by the Royal Navy and scuttled following an unsuccessful attempt to land arms for the Irish Volunteers in Tralee Bay. The same day, Roger Casement and two others are arrested at Banna Strand, County Kerry, for attempting to land arms and ammunition.
- The poet John Masefield spends Good Friday close to Lollingdon Farm. He pens Good Friday: A Play in Verse this year.
- Died: John Surratt, 72, American spy, member of the Confederate Secret Service during the American Civil War and one of the conspirators in the assassination of Abraham Lincoln, son to Mary Surratt; died of pneumonia (b. 1844)

== April 22, 1916 (Saturday) ==
- Siege of Kut – The British failed to capture Sannaiyat in Mesopotamia at a loss of 1,200 casualties, effectively sealing the fate of the defending British Indian soldiers at Kut.
- The Chinese troop transport ship SS Hsin-Yu capsized off the Chinese coast after colliding with Chinese cruiser Hai Yung in thick fog, killing at least 1,000 men.
- Easter Rising – Eoin MacNeill, Chief of Staff of the Irish Volunteers, canceled all manoeuvres of Volunteers planned for the following day.
- The Royal Flying Corps established the No. 70 Squadron.
- Born:
  - Yehudi Menuhin, American-born Israeli violinist, founder of the Menuhin Festival Gstaad in Gstaad, Switzerland, the Yehudi Menuhin School in Stoke d'Abernon, Surrey, Great Britain, and The Nueva School in Hillsborough, California; in New York City, United States (d. 1999)
  - Kanan Devi, Indian actress and singer, considered the first star of Bengali cinema; in Howrah, British India (present-day India) (d. 1992)

== April 23, 1916 (Sunday) ==
- Easter Rising – The military council of the Irish Republican Brotherhood met at Liberty Hall in Dublin and decided to begin the planned insurrection at noon the next day. The Proclamation of the Irish Republic was signed by the seven leaders in the name of the Provisional Government of the Irish Republic. Irish Volunteers from Belfast and County Cork had begun manoeuvres but returned home.
- Battle of Katia – An Ottoman force under command of German officer Friedrich Freiherr Kress von Kressenstein surprised and defeated a British Indian Army cavalry unit north of El Ferdan on the Suez Canal, resulting in 500 British Indian casualties.
- Born:
  - Ivo Lola Ribar, Croatian politician, chief adviser to Josip Broz Tito, recipient of the People's Hero of Yugoslavia; in Zagreb, Kingdom of Croatia-Slavonia, Austria-Hungary (present-day Croatia) (killed in German bombing, 1943)
  - Bud Wilkinson, American football player and coach, quarterback for the Minnesota Golden Gophers football team from 1934 to 1936, coach for Oklahoma Sooners football team from 1946 to 1963; as Charles Burnham Wilkinson, in Minneapolis, United States (d. 1994)

== April 24, 1916 (Monday) ==
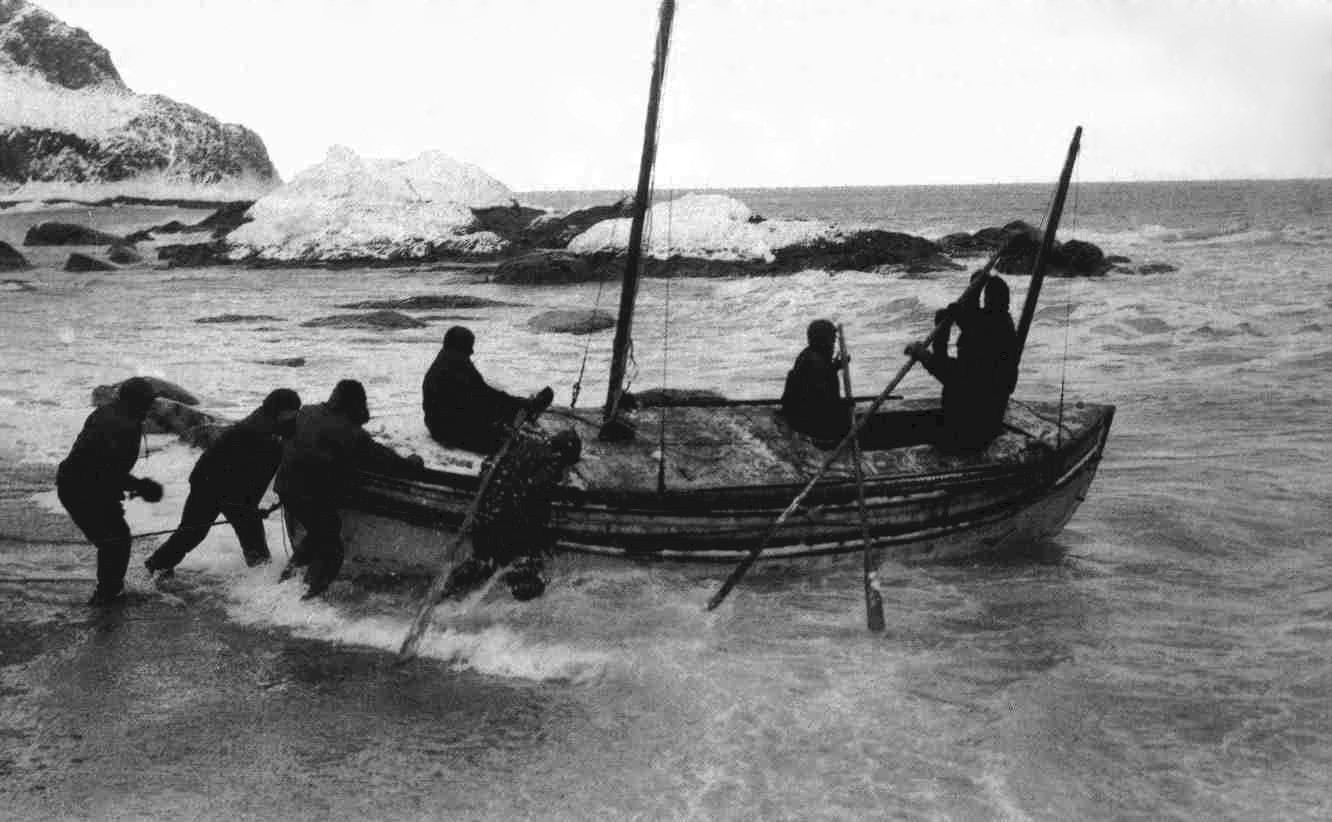
Ernest Shackleton and five companions launched a modified lifeboat from Elephant Island to seek help for the stranded Antarctic expedition.

- Easter Rising – Members of the Irish Republican Brotherhood proclaimed an Irish Republic as the Irish Volunteers and Irish Citizen Army occupied the General Post Office and other buildings in Dublin. Irish Republican leader Patrick Pearse read the proclamation on the steps of the post office while fellow Republican leader Liam Mellows lead a rising of Volunteers in County Galway.
- A German battle squadron commanded by Rear Admiral Friedrich Boedicker bombarded the ports of Yarmouth and Lowestoft on the eastern English coastline, killing 22 British servicemen and three civilians and wounded another 19. The bombardment also damaged or destroyed 200 homes and as well as damaging docked Royal Navy ships HMS Conquest and HMS Laertes.
- German Admiral Reinhard Scheer ordered all U-boats back to home port as Germany responded to international protests to indiscriminate attacks on commercial shipping.
- Voyage of the James Caird – British polar explorer Ernest Shackleton and five companions undertook an (800 nautical miles (1,500 km; 920 mi)) open boat journey from Elephant Island in the South Shetland Islands to South Georgia in the southern Atlantic Ocean to obtain rescue for the main body of the Imperial Trans-Antarctic Expedition following the loss of its ship Endurance in November.
- The Kienthal Conference, the second meeting of the anti-war socialist Zimmerwald Movement, was held in Kienthal, Switzerland.
- The Swedish association football club Fässberg was established in Mölndal, Sweden.
- Born: Lou Thesz, American professional wrestler. three-time winner of the NWA Worlds Heavyweight Championship; as Aloysius Martin Thesz, in Banat, Michigan, United States (d. 2002)

== April 25, 1916 (Tuesday) ==
- Easter Rising – Lord Wimborn, Lord Lieutenant of Ireland, declared martial law in Dublin for a period of one month and handed civil power over to Major-General William Lowe.
- The first Anzac Day was declared in Australia and New Zealand in memory of lives lost during the Gallipoli campaign.
- King Vajiravudh of Siam founded the Football Association of Thailand, which introduced the Kor Royal Cup as the national championship title for which Thailand association football clubs compete.
- Born:
  - John James Cowperthwaite, British civil servant, Financial Secretary for Hong Kong from 1961 to 1971; in Edinburgh, Scotland (d. 2006)
  - R. J. Rushdoony, American theologian, founder of Christian reconstructionism; as Rousas John Rushdoony, in New York City, United States (d. 2001)
  - Hind al-Husseini, Palestinian activist, most known for rescuing 55 orphaned survivors following the Deir Yassin massacre in 1948; in Jerusalem (d. 1994)
  - Jerry Barber, American golfer, winner of the 1961 PGA Championship; as Carl Jerome Barber, in Woodson, Illinois, United States (d. 1994)

== April 26, 1916 (Wednesday) ==
- Easter Rising – HMS Helga, the main river patrol vessel in Dublin, shelled Liberty Hall from the River Liffey. Several Irish Volunteers were killed in street fighting the same day, including Francis Browning and James McCormack, during the Battle of Mount Street Bridge. The same day, Irish pacifist leader Francis Sheehy-Skeffington was executed along with five other civilians at Portobello Barracks.
- Born:
  - George Tuska, American comic book artist, best known for work on Iron Man; in Hartford, Connecticut, United States (d. 2009)
  - Morris West, Australian writer, known for The Devil's Advocate and The Shoes of the Fisherman; in Clareville, New South Wales, Australia (d. 1999)
  - Arnold van Wyk, South African composer, known for his nationalistic pieces including Primavera; as Arnoldus Christiaan Vlok van Wyk, in Calvinia, South Africa (d. 1983)
- Died: Mário de Sá-Carneiro, 25, Portuguese poet, leading member of the Geração de Orpheu group; died by suicide (b. 1890)

== April 27, 1916 (Thursday) ==
- Easter Rising – Major-General John Maxwell arrived in Dublin to take command of 12,000 British troops that been dispatched to keep order.
- Gas attacks at Hulluch – The German army launched the most concentrated gas attacks of the war on the 16th Irish Division and 15th Scottish Division near the village of Hulluch, France, causing 549 casualties on the first day of the attack.
- Prince Leopold Clement, heir to the House of Saxe-Coburg and Gotha-Koháry in Austria-Hungary died after suffering for six months from injuries he sustained after he was horribly disfigured by an acid attack by his mistress Camilla Rybicka. With no direct heirs, his father Prince Philipp bequeathed the family fortune to his grandnephew Prince Philipp Josias.
- The Royal Flying Corps established the No. 55 Squadron.
- The first publication of the Swedish Communist newspaper Folkets Dagblad Politiken was released with socialist politician Ture Nerman as editor. It served as a mouthpiece for the newly formed Swedish Social Democratic Left Party and would run until 1940.
- Born:
  - Rudolph B. Davila, American army officer, only American of Filipino descent to receive the Medal of Honor (for actions in Italy during World War II); in El Paso, United States (d. 2002)
  - Enos Slaughter, American baseball player, right fielder for the St. Louis Cardinals and New York Yankees from 1938 to 1959, four-time World Series champion; in Roxboro, North Carolina, United States (d. 2002)

== April 28, 1916 (Friday) ==
- Easter Rising – A group of Irish Volunteers at Ashbourne, County Meath forced the Royal Irish Constabulary to surrender, with eight police killed along with two Volunteers, including Charles Carrigan.
- Edison Records carried out the first public "comparison test" between live and recorded singing voices at Carnegie Hall, featuring soprano Marie Rappold.
- Born: Ferruccio Lamborghini, Italian automobile manufacturer, designer of the Lamborghini sports car; in Cento, Kingdom of Italy (present-day Italy) (d. 1993)

== April 29, 1916 (Saturday) ==
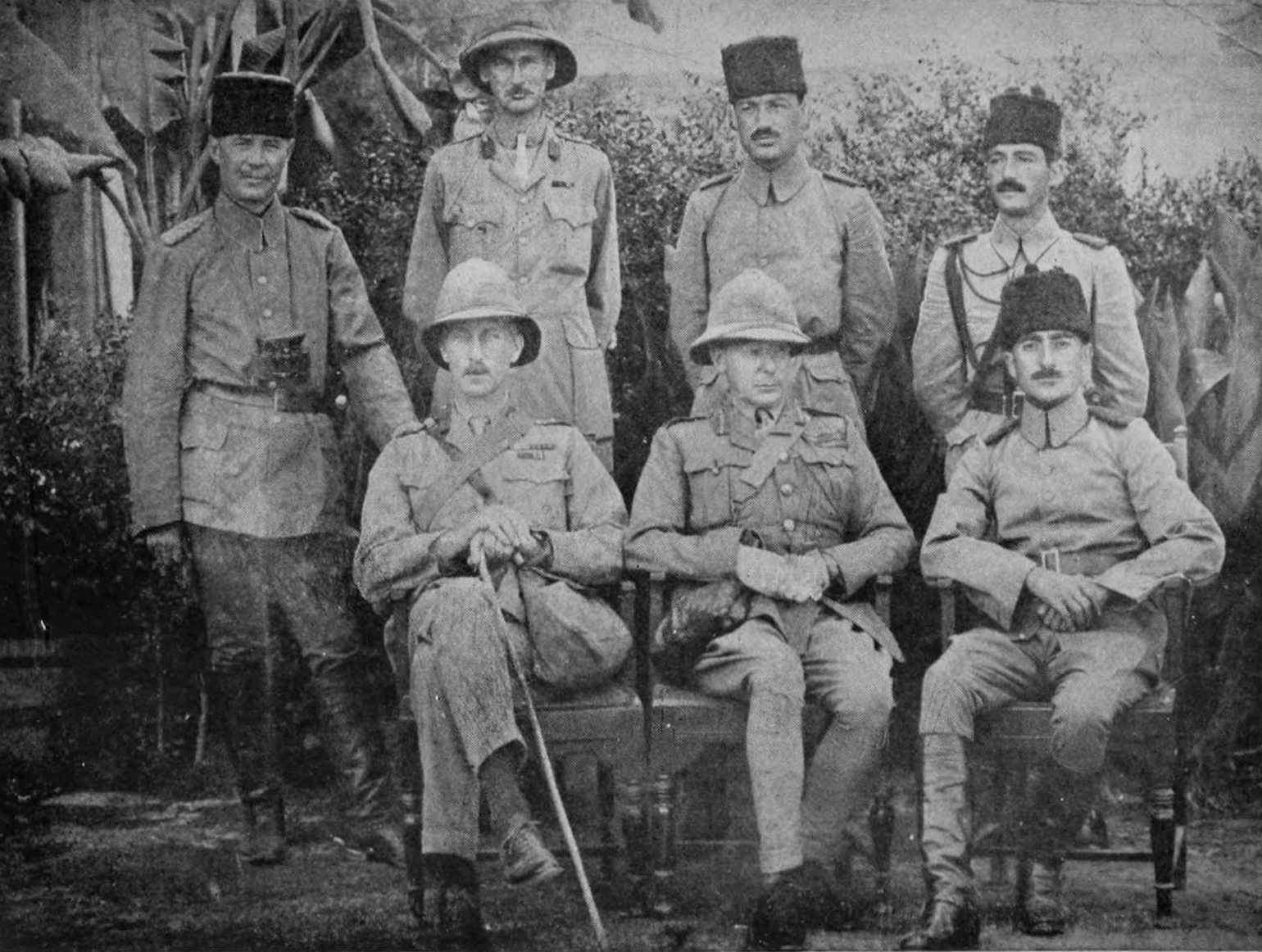
British commander Charles Townshend met Halil Pasha to surrender after the city of Kut fell.

- Siege of Kut – British forces surrendered to the Ottoman Empire at Kut on the Tigris in Basra Vilayet during the Mesopotamian campaign.
- Easter Rising – Irish Volunteers retreated from the General Post Office in Dublin. The O'Rahilly, founder of the Irish Volunteers, died while charging a British machine gun nest. By 3:45 p.m., Irish Republican leaders Patrick Pearse, James Connolly and Thomas MacDonagh surrendered unconditionally to the British Army as the uprising collapsed.
- Gas attacks at Hulluch – The German gas attacks ended with British casualties totaling 1,980, of whom 1,260 were gas casualties, 338 being killed. German casualties varied in historic reports, ranging from 1,100 casualties to 1,600 gas casualties.
- U.S. Navy tanker USS Abarenda was launched by the Union Iron Works in San Francisco, and was used primarily by the United States Coast Guard.
- Born:
  - James M. Collins, American politician, U.S. Representative from Texas from 1968 to 1983; in Hallsville, Texas, United States (d. 1989)
  - Lars Korvald, Norwegian state leader, Prime Minister of Norway from 1972 to 1973; in Mjøndalen, Norway (d. 2006)

== April 30, 1916 (Sunday) ==
- The Royal Flying Corps established the No. 60 Squadron.
- The Newark Public Service Terminal opened to provide street-car service for Newark, New Jersey.
- Born:
  - Claude Shannon, American mathematician, credited for being the father of information theory; in Petoskey, Michigan, United States (d. 2001)
  - Robert Shaw, American conductor, conducted the Cleveland Orchestra and the Atlanta Symphony Orchestra, recipient of 14 Grammy Awards; in Red Bluff, California, United States (d. 1999)
- Died:
  - Michael Hicks Beach, 78, British politician, President of the Board of Trade from 1888 to 1892 and Chancellor of the Exchequer from 1895 to 1902 (b. 1837)
  - Francisco del Paso y Troncoso, 73, Mexican historian, one of chief producers of definitive historic volumes on Mexico (b. 1842)

== Sources ==
- Foulkes, C. H. (1934). "Gas!" The Story of the Special Brigade. Edinburgh: William Blackwood. OCLC 2325204.
- Verdun and the Battles for its Possession. Clermont Ferrand: Michelin and Cie. 1919. OCLC 654957066.
