= Baldoyle =

Coastal north-eastern suburb of Dublin, Ireland

Baldoyle Baile Dúill (Irish)
- Suburb
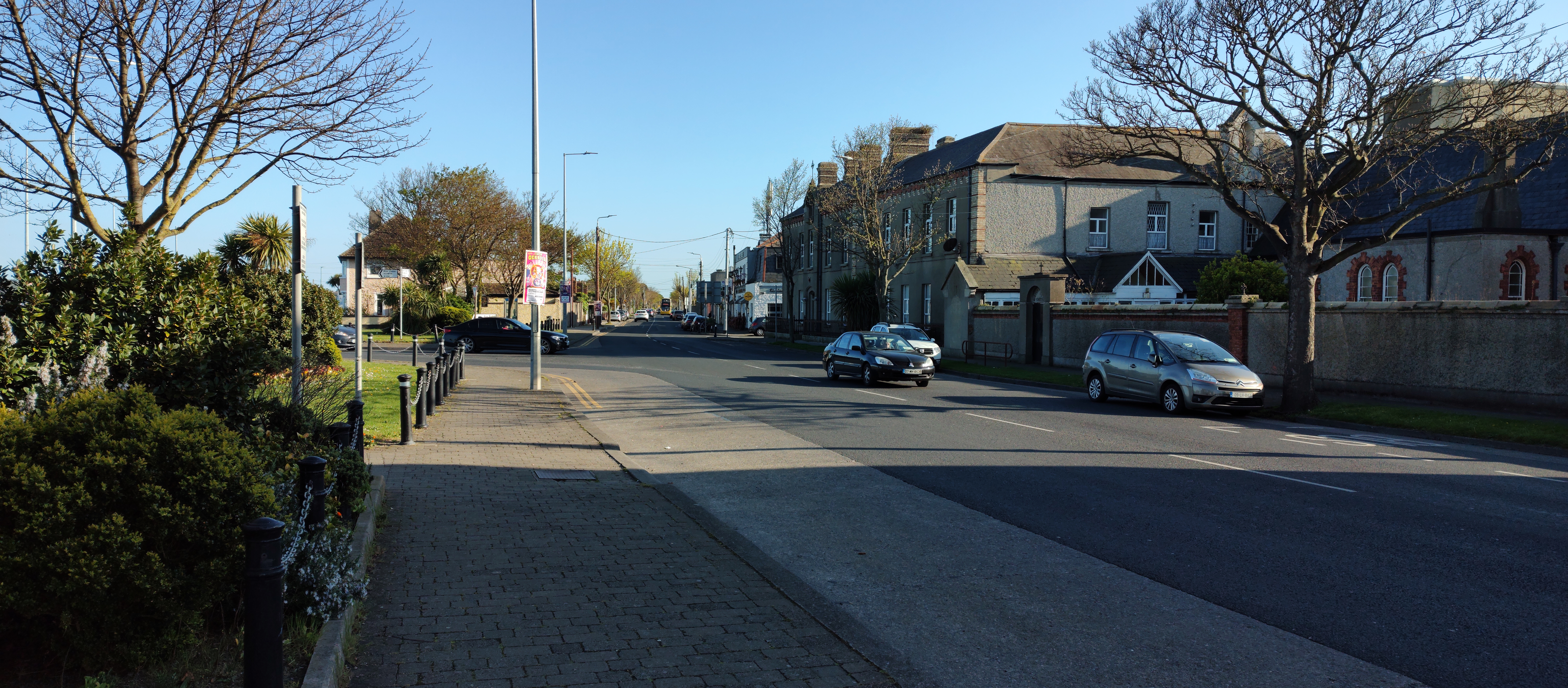
- Main Street

- Location within Dublin Location within Ireland
- Coordinates: 53.39659°N 6.12664°W
- Country: Ireland
- Province: Leinster
- Traditional county: County Dublin
- Local authority: Fingal County Council
- Eircode routing key: D13

Baldoyle (Irish: Baile Dúill) is a coastal suburb of Dublin, Ireland, developed from a former fishing village. It began as a Viking settlement.

Baldoyle is also a civil parish in the barony of Coolock within the traditional County Dublin.

== Etymology ==
The district name derives from baile meaning "town" and dubh-ghaill meaning "dark (-haired) stranger", the name given by the Gaels to the Danes to distinguish them from the Norwegians or "fair (-haired) strangers" (finn-ghaill) who first settled in Ireland in 841–842. While it is sometimes rendered as "Doyle's town" with reference to the personal name Doyle which itself derives from dubh-ghaill, there is no evidence for this usage.

== History ==
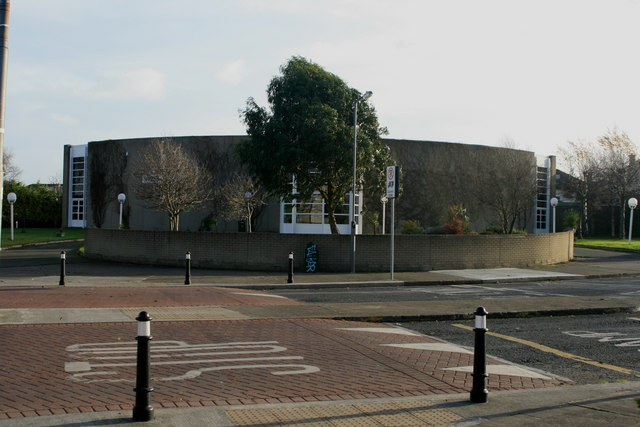
Church of St. Laurence O'Toole, Baldoyle

Baldoyle with its sheltered waterside location, was a Viking base for many years, eventually razed by an attack by the King of Leinster in 1012. However, it remained under Danish control under the arrival of the Anglo-Normans, when the last Danish chieftain, Hamund McTorkaill, was overthrown. The lands of Baldoyle were later presented to the Priory of All Hallows, which had been founded by Diarmaid mac Murchadha in 1150, on the site that is now Trinity College Dublin. The monks built the Grange Church, now known as Grange Abbey, which now lies in Donaghmede. By the 1500s, the area owned by the Priory at Baldoyle included gardens, arable land, pasture, a meadow, a copse, a warren, and woodland. The Priory lost the lands in 1536, during the dissolution of the monasteries when Henry VIII granted the lands to the Dublin Corporation. By 1630, Grange Abbey was in ruins, but the associated graveyard was used into the 1700s.

During the 1600s, there was an hostelry or inn in Baldoyle, which is recounted in one of the oldest hunting songs recorded from Ireland concerning Michael St Lawrence and a hunting party who went to Baldoyle after a day of hunting. The manuscript of the song is held in the Sloan manuscripts of the British Museum. During the 1700s, Jonathan Swift was a frequent visitor to Baldoyle, who had a number of friends who lived in the area, including at Grange House.

A description of Baldoyle from Lewis's Topographical Dictionary of Ireland (Dublin, 1837) gives a useful summary of what was then a substantial rural fishing village:

The village is pleasantly situated on an inlet or creek of the Irish Sea, to the north of the low isthmus that connects Howth, with the mainland: it comprises about 200 houses, and is much frequented in summer for sea-bathing. Some of the inhabitants are engaged in the fishery, which at the commencement of the present century employed nine wherries belonging to this place, averaging seven or eight men each; at present nearly 100 men are so, engaged. Sir W. de Windsor, lord-justice of Ireland, held a parliament here in 1369. The creek is formed between the mainland and the long tract of sand on the north of Howth, at the point of which, near that port, a white buoy is placed; it is fit only for small craft. The manor was granted to the priory of All Saints, Dublin, by Diarmit, the son of Murchard, King of Leinster, who founded that house in 1166.

The parliament mentioned above was held at Grange Church, which was partly restored in the late 20th century after a period of neglect. At that time the area had a population of 1208, of whom 1009 lived in the village, and the lands belonged entirely to Dublin Corporation. There were three "big houses" viz Grange Lodge, Donaghmede House and Talavera, a police station and a coast guard base, and both a parish school and a hedge school, and at least one holy well.

At the turn of the 20th century, Baldoyle was still primarily a fishing village, with 9 fishing wherries. The small harbour also received coal shipments. At this time, Baldoyle was also a popular bathing spot, and attracted visitors. James Warren, allegedly Ireland's oldest man, died in Baldoyle in 1887 at age 167.

The new district of Donaghmede, comprising perhaps six major housing development areas and a commercial and social core, was "carved out" of Baldoyle's inland lands, along with a little of Coolock, and some places often described as part of Raheny, in the 1960s and 1970s; it now has a population considerably greater than that of Baldoyle.

=== Baldoyle Racecourse ===
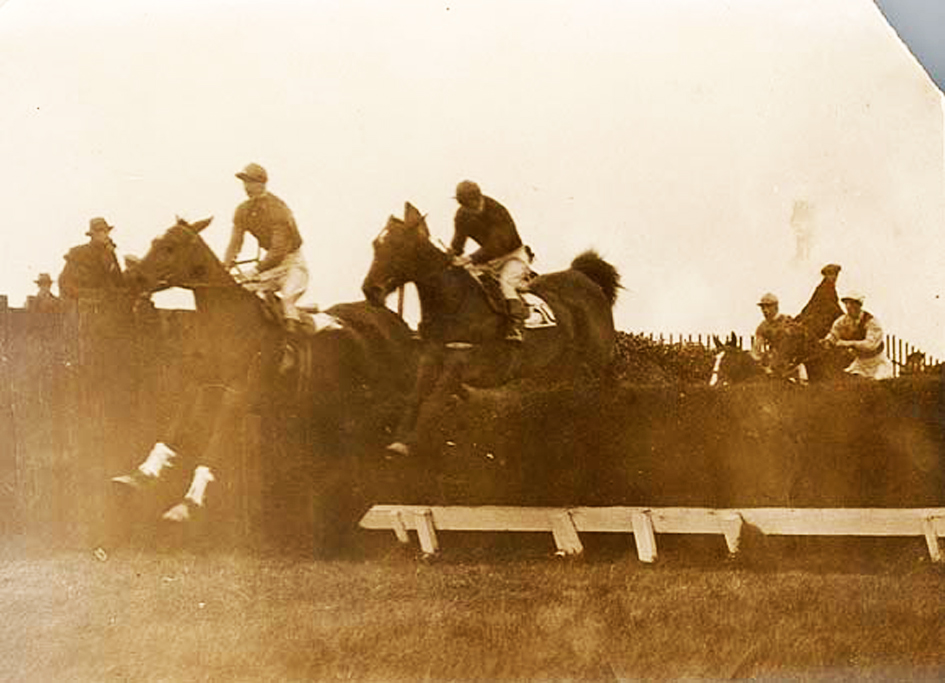
Steeplechase for the Metropolitan Plate at Baldoyle Racecourse, 16 March 1923

For most of the 20th century, Baldoyle was well known for its racecourse, which was one of three in the Dublin metropolitan area (and for a period the only one). Open land in the village had been an informal venue for horse races in the early nineteenth century, and annual race meetings at the site were proposed in 1842 at the same time as the closure of the Howth Park Racecourse in nearby Sutton and Howth. A new enclosed course was opened in May 1874, which continued in regular use for almost a century, until it was closed in August 1972 due to financial difficulties related to the potential costs of necessary renovations.

The year after closure, on 31 October 1973, one of the most spectacular and audacious escapes from an Irish prison took place when three of the Provisional IRA's key personnel were airlifted to freedom in a hijacked helicopter from Mountjoy Prison. The helicopter touched down at the disused racecourse where the IRA members escaped in waiting cars.

For several years during the 1960s, Baldoyle Racecourse became the destination for annual sponsored charity walks, which were intended to raise funds for the Central Remedial Clinic.

== Location and access ==
Planned DART, including the new Clongriffin DART station on Grange Road to serve inner Baldoyle

Baldoyle is located northeast of the city, and borders Donaghmede, which was formed from its western part, Portmarnock, Sutton and Bayside. It can be accessed from the coast road from Dublin to Howth, which includes a cycle track, from Sutton Cross via Station Road, or from Donaghmede, or Portmarnock.

Baldoyle is served by Dublin Bus and Irish Rail, the latter currently via the Sutton and Bayside stations on the Howth Branch of the DART, and by Clongriffin station on the Northern Branch, which is also the Dublin-Belfast main line. The railway line functions as the western boundary of the area.

Baldoyle is also served by Dublin Bus routes H1 (Baldoyle to City Centre) and H2 (Malahide to City Centre via Portmarnock)

Areas neighbouring Baldoyle are Sutton, Bayside, Portmarnock and Donaghmede, including Clongriffin.

== Geography ==
Baldoyle is mostly level coastal plains, with the Mayne River passing under the railway line through a bridge structure known as the "Red Arches" and crossing in its northern parts, and coming to the sea. This river takes in the Grange Stream from Donaghmede, and other tributaries, notably the Seagrange Park Stream from the south and a small tributary from the Clongriffin estate to the west. The Mayne has, and some of its tributaries had, a history of flooding. A boy drowned in 1993 in the Seagrange Park Stream, when it was being culverted. This stream had once run south to the sea at Kilbarrack Road but was diverted to the Mayne.

A major townland of Baldoyle, encompassing much of what is now Donaghmede, is Grange, indicating that it was previously farmland.

== Features and Development ==
Baldoyle village today has a coastal main street, with a Roman Catholic church, a community hall, a modern county library branch with sea views, and some shops and pubs. Slightly inland, among the older suburban houses, is a small shopping precinct containing a Lidl supermarket, a football club, another Roman Catholic church, and other amenities. On the approach from the coast road is a well-known pub, the Elphin.

=== Baldoyle Industrial Estate ===
On Grange Road towards Donaghmede is a light industrial estate, with more than forty businesses and the local An Post sorting and delivery office. Businesses located there include major generic pharmaceuticals player Mylan, the largest tenant of the estate, Irish Papers, Grange Builders Providers, Ferrum Trading Co Ltd Steel Stockholders, Poolbeg Press, Curtis & Lees, Ireland's Eye Knitwear, Grange Electrical Wholesalers, Baldoyle Print and Forest Tosara, producers of Sudocrem (invented in Dublin).

=== Housing developments ===
In the 20th and 21st centuries, Baldoyle has been at the centre of a large housebuilding programme, with the former racecourse having been sold to developers. The new developments have begun, as "The Coast", facing a new local centre at the northern edge of Donaghmede, Clongriffin. Clongriffin Dart station opened in April 2010 serving Baldoyle and racecourse developments such as "The Coast", and northern Donaghmede.

=== Parks ===
Seagrange Park is a public park that includes a modern playground and sports pitches. A new public park was to be built on part of the former racecourse lands, including a wildlife or nature park, and while this is still pending, a community garden is maintained on part of those lands.

=== Christian Brothers ===
Among the local residents are the retired members of the Congregation of Christian Brothers, whose retirement home, St. Patricks, is located in the village. There is a graveyard where approx 1,000 members of the Christian Brothers are buried. St. Josephs, Baldoyle was formerly the site of the Christian Brothers Training School.

== Education ==
In the centre of the village is a secondary school for girls, St. Mary's, while further inland is a large co-educational secondary school, Pobalscoil Neasáin. There is a co-educational primary school, St. Laurence's National School, catering for children aged 4–12, and with junior and senior buildings. Formerly St. Peter and Paul's BNS and St. Mary's GNS, the schools amalgamated at the beginning of the 2013/2014 school year to become St. Laurence's National School. Junior Infants to 2nd Class pupils attend the junior school in the Grange Road campus (the former girls' school), while 3rd Class to 6th Class pupils attend the senior school in the Brookstone Road campus (the former boys' school). Both buildings are within minutes of each other. Also in the village area is a special needs primary school run by St. Micheals house.

== Religion ==
Baldoyle is a parish in the Howth deanery of the Roman Catholic Archdiocese of Dublin.

== Governance ==
Baldoyle lies within the administrative area of Fingal County Council, directly bordering the Dublin City Council administrative area along its western perimeter near Donaghmede.

== Sport ==
=== GAA ===
Na Dubh Ghall are the local GAA club and have teams across all age groups catering for both girls and boys, and play at Racecourse Park.

=== Association football ===
Baldoyle is home to Baldoyle United FC, with teams in the NDSL, MGL and Leinster Senior League, and principal facilities at Brookstone Road. Games are also played at Racecourse Park and Seagrange Road, Baldoyle. There were for a short period two clubs, Baldoyle United and Grange United, which merged in 2015. A combined name, Baldoyle Grange United, was announced for the senior team but the remaining activity was continued as simple Baldoyle United. Since 2017 all teams play as Baldoyle United FC.

Baldoyle United has over 25 teams at schoolboy, schoolgirl and adult levels. In 2016 it won the FAI Community Club of the Year and also Fingal County Council's Community Group of the Year.

=== Badminton ===
Baldoyle has a dedicated badminton centre on Grange Road, one of the two centres of Leinster Badminton, with eight courts. There is an active local club, Baldoyle District Badminton Club, based there, and it is also used substantially by several other clubs, including two from Raheny.

== Notable people ==
- Robbie Brady, Irish international association footballer
- Nicky Byrne, singer
- James Chambers, footballer for Bethlehem Steel
- Edward Fitz-Symon of Grange Abbey, Elizabethan judge
- Erica-Cody, Irish R&B singer-songwriter
- James McCormack, activist and revolutionary (including the Easter Rising)
- Willie Nolan, Irish golfer, Willie Nolan Road in Baldoyle takes his name.
- Jennifer Zamparelli, Irish comedian and television presenter

== See also ==
- List of towns and villages in Ireland
