= Amélie-les-Bains-Palalda =

- Commune
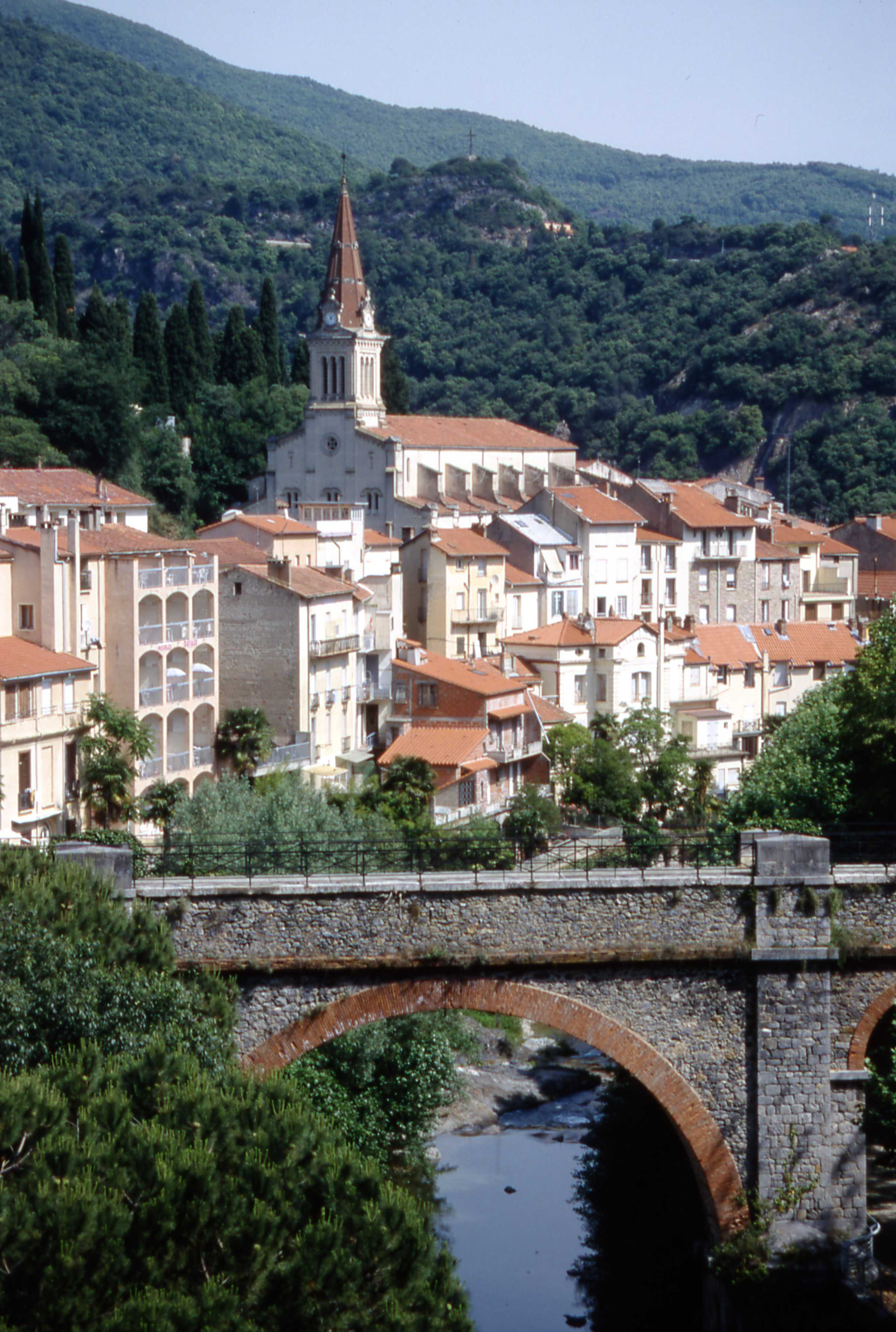
- The Mondony river and the parish church of Our Lady of Life, in Amélie-les-Bains-Palalda

- Coat of arms
- Location of Amélie-les-Bains-Palalda
- Location within France Location within Occitanie
- Coordinates: 42°28′34″N 2°40′21″E
- Country: France
- Region: Occitania
- Department: Pyrénées-Orientales
- Arrondissement: Céret
- Canton: Le Canigou
- Intercommunality: Le Haut Vallespir

Government
  - Mayor (2020–2026): Marie Costa
- Area^{1}: 29.43 km^{2} (11.36 sq mi)
- Elevation: 240 m (790 ft)
- Highest elevation: 1,424 m (4,672 ft)
- Lowest elevation: 176 m (577 ft)
- Population (2023): 3,529
  - Density: 119.9/km^{2} (310.6/sq mi)
- Time zone: UTC+01:00 (CET)
  - Summer (DST): UTC+02:00 (CEST)
- INSEE/Postal code: 66003 /66110
- ^{1} French Land Register data, which excludes lakes, ponds, glaciers > 1 km^{2} (0.386 sq mi or 247 acres) and river estuaries.

Amélie-les-Bains-Palalda (French pronunciation: [ameli le bɛ̃ palalda]; Catalan: Els Banys i Palaldà) is a commune in the Pyrénées-Orientales department in southern France.

It is situated in the Tech valley, and combines the old and the new with a mix of narrow cobbled streets and modern accommodation. It has become a 'station verte' meaning that it must strive at all times to ensure that tourists benefit from a calm and natural environment.

== Geography ==
=== Location ===
Amélie-les-Bains-Palalda is located in the canton of Le Canigou and in the arrondissement of Céret. It sits at the confluence of the Mondony with the Tech, 28.5 miles (46 km) SSW of Perpignan by road. The town is situated at a height of 770 feet (230 m) and has both a winter and summer season.

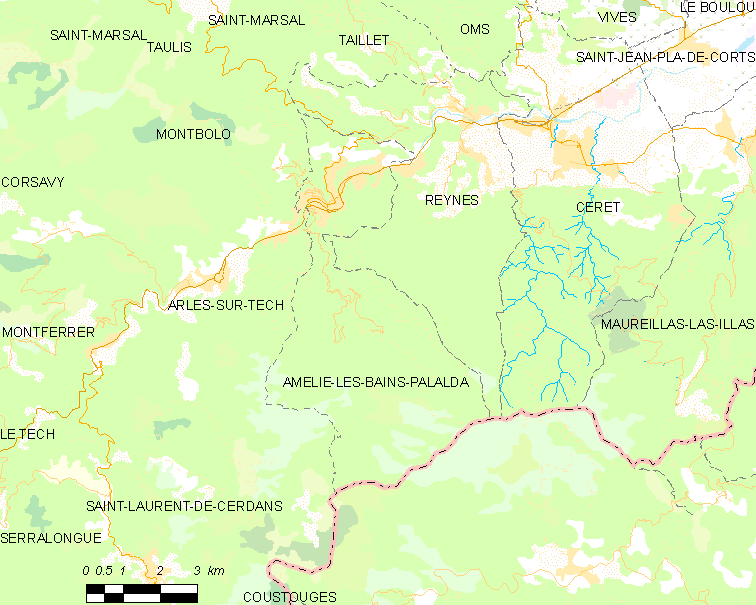
Map of Amélie-les-Bains-Palalda and its surrounding communes

=== Climate ===
In the winter season the average temperature is about 10 degrees Celsius, and in the summer it is roughly 29 degrees Celsius with the occasional thunderstorm late afternoon.

=== Springs ===
The town has numerous sulphur springs (20-60C.). They have been used as baths by those with rheumatism and illnesses of the lungs. By the end of the 19th century there were two bathing establishments, one of which preserved remains of Roman baths, and a large military thermal hospital.

== Toponymy ==
The town, formerly called Les-Bains-d'Arles, became Fort-les-Bains in 1670 after the construction of the new castle. It was renamed Amélie-les-Bains in 1840 after Queen Amelia wife of Louis Philippe. She finally visited the town in 1848, and subsequently promoted it. In Catalan it is still called Els banys d'Arles.

== History ==
In 1942, the former communes of Amélie-les-Bains and Palalda were merged to form the new commune Amélie-les-Bains-Palalda.

== Government and politics ==
François Mefler, mayor of Amélie-les-Bains since October 1941, became the new mayor of Amélie-les-Bains-Palalda in October 1942, after Amélie-les-Bains and Palalda were united together.

Mayor	Term start	Term end
François Mefler	October 1942	August 1944
Gaudérique Parent	August 1944	March 1945
Georges Bosch	March 1945	December 1950
Jean Trescases	December 1950	January 1951
Gustave Pouzens	February 1951	February 1952
Paul Alduy	February 1952	March 1959
Jean Aspar	March 1959	April 1959
Jacqueline Alduy	April 1959	March 2001
Alexandre Reynal	March 2001	July 2020
Marie Costa	July 2020	

== Population ==
Historical population
Year	Pop.	±% p.a.
1968	3,662	—
1975	3,908	+0.93%
1982	3,713	−0.73%
1990	3,239	−1.69%
1999	3,475	+0.78%
2007	3,683	+0.73%
2012	3,680	−0.02%
2017	3,460	−1.23%
2023	3,529	+0.33%
Source: INSEE

== Sites of interest ==
- Fort-les-Bains, fortress built in 1670 above Amélie-les-Bains.

== Notable people ==
- Maximilien Chaudoir (1816–1881), Russian entomologist, died in Amélie-les-Bains;
- Pierre Restany (1930–2003), art critic and philosopher, born in Amélie-les-Bains.
- Jean Trescases, a French military officer was born in Palalda

== See also ==
- Communes of the Pyrénées-Orientales department
