= Jean Trescases =

French Army Chief Warrant officer (1916–1951)

- Jean Jules Émile Trescases
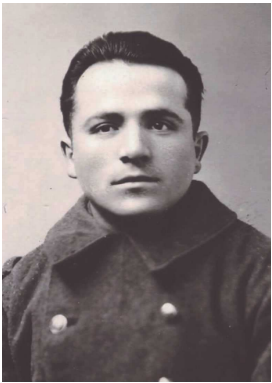
- Born: Jean Jules Émile Trescases; April 5, 1916; Palalda
- Died: November 21, 1951; Bang-Son, Vietnam
- Cause of death: ambush
- Spouse: Yvonne Marie Louise FULACHIER (m. 1946)
- Children: Paul Trescases
- Military career
- Allegiance: French Army
- Service years: 1934–1951
- Conflicts: Second World War; Indochina War
- Awards: Chevalier (Knight) of the Légion d'honneur Military medal. Croix de guerre 1939–1945 with 1 silver star. Croix de guerre des Théâtres d'opérations extérieurs with 2 palms, 1 vermeil star, 1 silver star and 3 bronze stars. Colonial medal, with "Far East" clasp. Commemorative medal for the Indochina campaign. French commemorative medal for operations in the Middle East.
- Memorials: Mémorial des guerres en Indochine in Fréjus

Jean Jules Émile Trescases (April 5, 1916 – November 21, 1951), also known as Jean Trescases, was a French Army Chief warrant officer who fought in various conflicts. Born on April 5, 1916, in Palalda, in the present-day commune of Amélie-les-Bains in the Pyrénées-Orientales region, he died in action on November 21, 1951, during the Indochina War.

== Biography ==
The 5th of 4 siblings, Jean Trescases enlisted at the age of 18 in Perpignan, as he had a keen sense of discipline and was assigned to the 17th regiment of Senegalese infantrymen. He is the son of Julien Pierre Joseph Trescases, a farmer from Pyrénées-Orientales.

Jean Trescases married Yvonne Marie Louise FULACHIER (June 12, 1911 – February 18, 1999) on January 17, 1946, in Perpignan, Pyrénées-Orientales, France, with whom he had one child, named Paul Trescases.

During his military career, Jean Trescases served in various units, including the 42nd Malagasy Machine Gun Battalion, then stationed in Ariège, the 16th Senegalese Tirailleurs Regiment, the 22nd Colonial Infantry Regiment and the 30th Senegalese Tirailleurs March Battalion. He took part in the Second World War and the Indochina War.

He died on November 21, 1951, following an ambush.

== Career ==
Assigned to the 17th Regiment of Senegalese Tirailleurs, Private Trescases landed in Beirut on August 4, 1934, to join his unit. Appointed corporal two years later, he left the Middle East in July 1937 to serve with the 42th Bataillon de Mitrailleurs Malgaches stationed at Pamiers in the Ariège region of France.

Promoted to master corporal on September 1, 1937, then sergeant 18 months later, he volunteered to serve in French West Africa, arriving at Port Bouet in June 1939. Promoted to first sergeant on June 1, 1941, he was assigned to the military cabinet of the Governor of Côte d'Ivoire.

In 1942, marked by the German presence in the occupied zone, he joined the Free France after crossing the Spanish and Portuguese borders, arriving in Great Britain by air on January 10, 1943. He joined the Free French Forces for the duration of the war, becoming a distinguished instructor at the Free French Cadet School in Ribbesford.

After the war, he was assigned to the 16th Régiment de Tirailleurs Sénégalais in April 1945, and promoted to chief warrant officer in February 1946, before volunteering to serve in the Far East.

He distinguished himself by his courage and determination during several engagements in Indochina, receiving numerous commendations for his heroic actions. On November 21, 1951, during an ambush near the village of Bang-Son, Chief Warrant Officer Trescases was mortally wounded, leaving behind a legacy of bravery and exemplary service.

His captain singled him out, saying: "He was one of the finest fighters in Indochina, and his reputation for bravery spread throughout Tonkin".

== Awards ==
For his courageous actions on the battlefield, Jean Trescases received several distinctions.

- Chevalier (Knight) of the Légion d'honneur
- Military medal.
- Croix de guerre 1939–1945 with 1 silver star.
- Croix de guerre des théâtres d'opérations extérieures with 2 palms, 1 vermeil star, 1 silver star and 3 bronze stars.
- Colonial Medal, with "Far East" clasp.
- Indochina Campaign Commemorative Medal.
- French commemorative medal for operations in the Middle East.

During his career, Jean Jules Émile Trescases received 8 commendations.

== Homage ==
Trescases’s service earned recognition from his peers and commanders. His military career and actions during the conflict remain documented within French military history as examples of modern warfare tactics and leadership from that era.

He was appointed Patron of the 261st graduating class of the École nationale des sous-officiers d'active 2eme Bataillon from May 4, 2009, to December 18, 2009.

His name appears on the Mémorial des guerres en Indochine in Fréjus.
