= Palalda =

Coordinates: 42°29′02″N 2°40′29″E

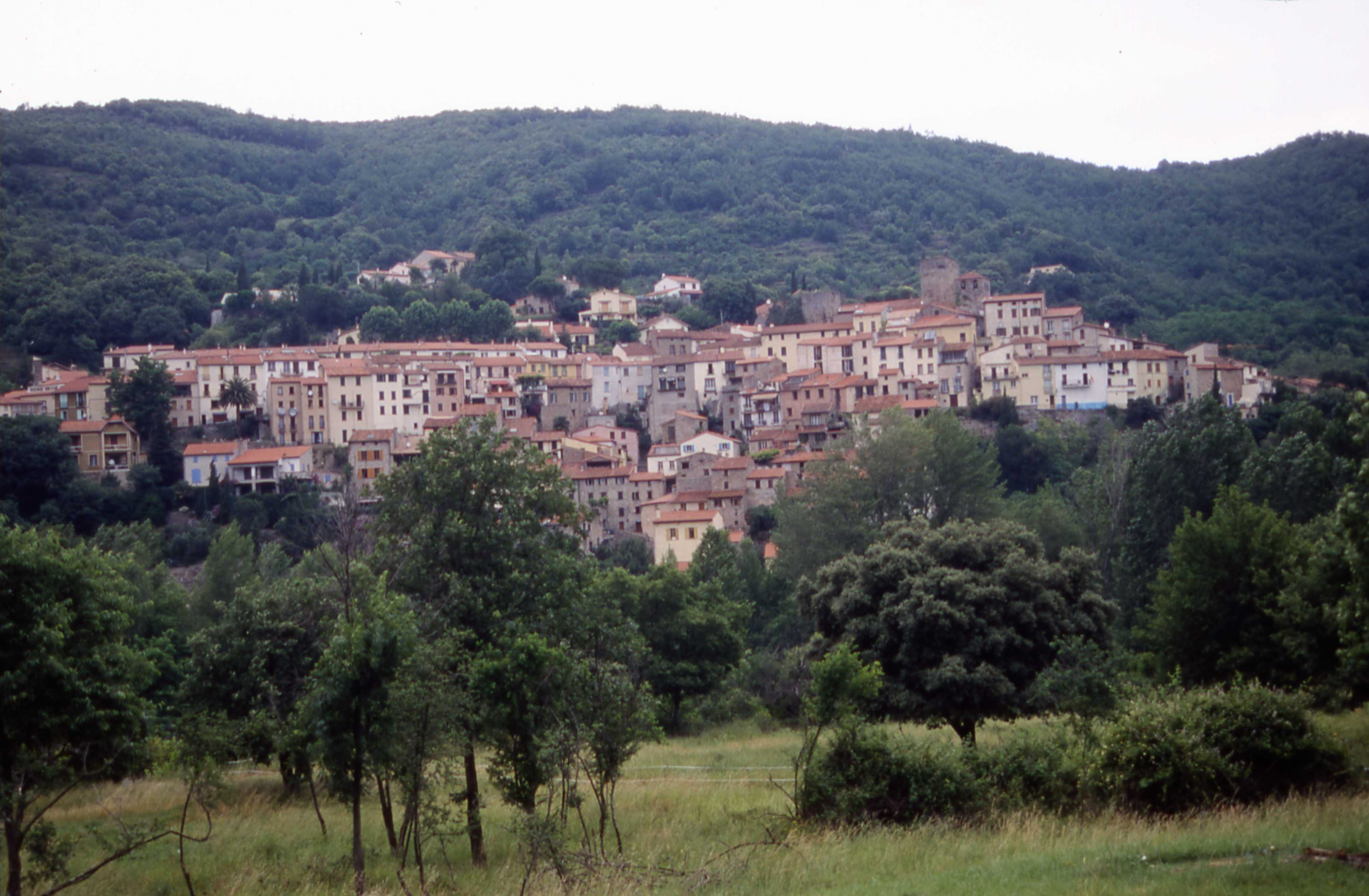
View of Palalda

Palalda (French pronunciation: [palalda]; Catalan: Palaldà) is a former commune in Pyrénées-Orientales, now part of Amélie-les-Bains-Palalda.

== Geography ==
Palalda is located above the river Tech, to the northeast of Amélie-les-Bains and to the east of Montbolo.

== History ==
The first mention of Palalda is from the year 814, as being the western limit of the territory of Céret.

On 1 October 1942, the commune of Palalda is linked to Amélie-les-Bains to create the new commune of Amélie-les-Bains-Palalda.

== Politics and administration ==
=== Canton ===
In 1790, Palalda is included in the canton of Arles, which remains the same after being united to Amélie-les-bains in 1942.

=== Mayors ===
Beginning	End	Name
1844	1847	François Vilascèque
1847	1849	Martin Bardetis
1849	16.4.1855	Martin Pagès
16.5.1855	2.5.1857	Martin Forga
2.5.1857	1870	Jean Cambouliu
1870	2.1874	François Alduy
2.1874	8.10.1876	Jean Bartre
8.10.1876	30.9.1883	Sauveur Dalmau
30.9.1883	21.5.1884	Pierre Dejaule
21.5.1884	20.5.1888	Joseph Cabanes
20.5.1888	26.11.1899	Laurent Alduy
26.11.1899	15.5.1904	Joseph Dagues (father)
15.05.1904	25.5.1914	Joseph Dagues (son)
25.5.1914	10.12.1919	Louis Villacèque
10.12.1919	22.12.1921	François Dagues
22.12.1921	24.1.1922	Jean Garrigue
29.1.1922	17.5.1925	Joseph Pauly
17.5.1925	19.5.1929	Antoine Forga
19.5.1929	19.5.1935	Joseph Baux
19.5.1935	27.7.1941	Michel Fons
21.8.1941	1.10.1942	Marti

== Demography ==
Ancien Régime

Population under the Ancien Régime is calculated either in number of feu fiscal (f, fire tax), or in number of inhabitants (H).

Historical population

Year	Pop.
1378	21 f
1470	10 f
1515	14 f
1553	14 f

Year	Pop.
1709	101 f
1720	100 f
1730	112 f
1767	546 H

Year	Pop.
1774	120 f
1789	200 f
1790	646 H

Source: Jean-Pierre Pélissier, Paroisses et communes de France : dictionnaire d'histoire administrative et démographique, vol. 66 : Pyrénées-Orientales, Paris, CNRS, 1986

Modern times

Historical population

Year	Pop.	±%
1794	397	—
1796	529	+33.2%
1800	522	−1.3%
1804	524	+0.4%
1806	573	+9.4%
1820	594	+3.7%
1826	610	+2.7%
1831	614	+0.7%
1836	655	+6.7%
1841	710	+8.4%

Year	Pop.	±%
1846	772	+8.7%
1851	783	+1.4%
1856	758	−3.2%
1861	757	−0.1%
1866	839	+10.8%
1872	810	−3.5%
1876	908	+12.1%
1881	850	−6.4%
1886	800	−5.9%
1891	1,117	+39.6%

Year	Pop.	±%
1896	914	−18.2%
1901	800	−12.5%
1906	886	+10.7%
1911	953	+7.6%
1921	902	−5.4%
1926	1,142	+26.6%
1931	1,172	+2.6%
1936	1,363	+16.3%

Source: Jean-Pierre Pélissier, Paroisses et communes de France : dictionnaire d'histoire administrative et démographique, vol. 66 : Pyrénées-Orientales, Paris, CNRS, 1986

== Sites of interest ==
- The romanesque church of Saint Martin, built in the 12th century and partly rebuilt between the 15th and 16th centuries.

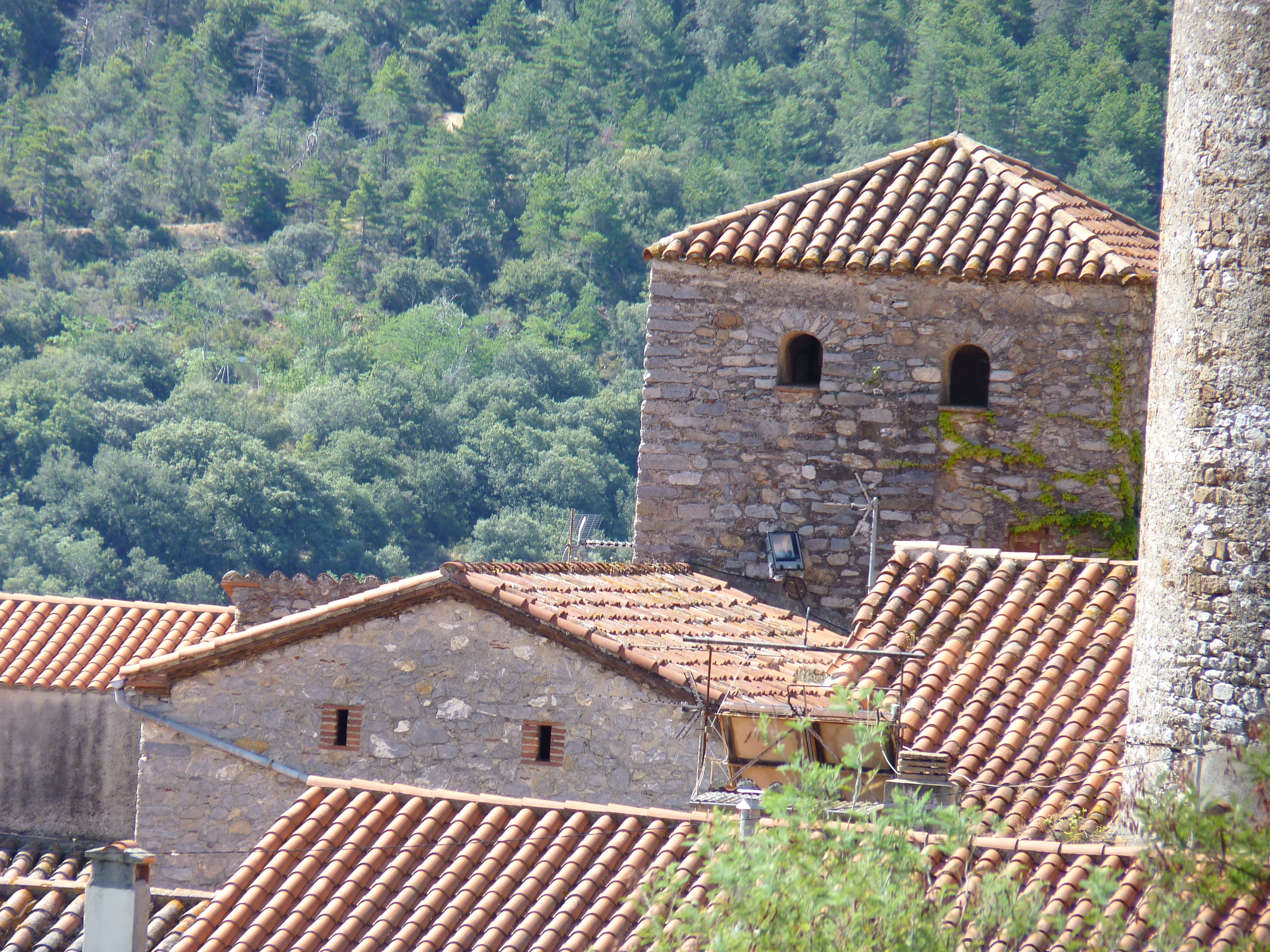
Saint Martin church

== Culture ==
Poetry

- Confidences d'un moutard parisien (1912) is a poem by the writer Marc Anfossi which mentions Palalda, Montbolo and Montalba-d'Amélie.

== Notable people ==
- Jean Trescases, a French military was born in Palalda

== See also ==
- Communes of the Pyrénées-Orientales department
