= Charles Carrigan =

Irish republican from Scotland

- Cathal Éamonn O'Corragáin
- Born: Charles Edward Carrigan; 28 April 1882; Glasgow, Scotland
- Died: 28 April 1916 (aged 34); Moore Street, Dublin, Ireland
- Resting place: St. Paul's section, Glasnevin Cemetery
- Organization: Irish Republican Brotherhood
- Political party: Sinn Féin
- Other political affiliations: United Irish League
- Military career
- Allegiance: Irish Republic
- Branch: Irish Volunteers
- Service years: 1915–1916
- Unit: Scottish Division
- Conflicts: Easter Rising

Charles ("Charlie") Edward Carrigan (Irish: Cathal Éamonn O'Corragáin; 28 April 1882 – 28 April 1916) was an Irish republican from Scotland.

== Background ==
Carrigan was born in Glasgow, Scotland, to Irish parents, but moved to Denny, Stirlingshire following the early death of his father. He was trained tailor to trade but also attended classes in history and literature and was proficient in French and Latin, studied Irish, and was a Gaelic Leaguer.

== Political activity ==
Carrigan became President of his local branch of the United Irish League in Denny in 1898 and later became a member of the Irish Republican Brotherhood (IRB) and in 1905 he became the Chairman of Sinn Féin's first ever Cumann in Scotland, the Éire Óg Craobh Cumann. In 1916 Carrigan was the official Scottish representative to the IRB.

== Easter Rising ==
Carrigan joined the Irish Volunteers in 1915 after the split from Redmonds National Volunteers. In January 1916, Carrigan and fellow IRB members from Glasgow travelled to Dublin along with members of Na Fianna and Cumann na mBan and formed the Scottish Division of the Irish Volunteers and were based at the home of Count Plunkett in Kimmage, County Dublin where they prepared for an insurrection against British rule in Ireland.

On Easter Monday, 24 April 1916, the overseas contingents including the Scottish Division and the North American-based Hibernian Rifles participated of the Easter Rising.

During an evacuation of the GPO under the command of The O'Rahilly, Carrigan was shot and killed by British soldiers on Moore Street.

Carrigan was buried in the St Paul's section of Glasnevin Cemetery.
