= James McCormack (Irish revolutionary) =

Irish activist and revolutionary (1877–1916)

- James McCormack, Dublin, 1908
- Born: 24 November 1877; Lisdornan, County Meath, Ireland
- Died: 26 April 1916 (aged 38); Dublin, Ireland
- Political party: Labour Party
- Spouse: Ann Rooney (m. 1908)
- Children: 3
- Military service
- Allegiance: Irish Citizen Army; Irish Republic
- Rank: Lieutenant
- Conflicts: Easter Rising †

James McCormack (1877–1916) was an Irish activist & revolutionary who, as part of the Irish Citizen Army, fought and died in the Easter Rising of 1916.

== Early life and family (1877–1906) ==
James McCormack was born 24 November 1877. His parents were Michael and Mary (née Sinnott), they were married 20 January 1877. Michael died at age 37 (about 1887). Mary, born 22 May 1858, to Hugh Synnott [sic] and Margaret Doyle, was 27-years-old when her husband died. James grew up with his younger brothers Hugh, John and Michael and sister Margaret in a place known as 'The Spot’ in Lisdornan near Julianstown, Stamullen and Bellewstown, in County Meath. He resided there until the close of 1900 when his family moved to a second home, also in Lisdornan, and where he continued to live until his departure for Dublin.

In 1904 he moved to Baldoyle, County Dublin, to begin employment at the Metropolitan Baldoyle Race Company Limited. There, he worked as a Senior Groundskeeper and Steward of the Turf Club, skilled in the construction and maintenance of 'the turf' and grounds, as well as creation of a new five-furlong gallop which would become renowned as one of the best in north-west Europe. He had previously been employed in the same endeavours at The Bellewstown Racecourse, which had been in operation since 1726.

As a young man, McCormack developed hunting (grouse, geese, ducks and deer) and weaponry skills and knowledge, which proved of great benefit later in life to the men and women trained, and drilled, under him in the Irish Citizen Army (ICA), at Liberty Hall, and Croydon Park, Fairview, working alongside Captain Jack White.

James married Annie Rooney from the Portmarnock-Malahide area in 1908 and they went on to have three sons, Michael born in 1909, Joseph born in 1911 and James, who was born in 1914. Annie was the daughter of Joseph Rooney, of Maynetown, the Rooney family later moved to the extant thatched cottage in the village of Baldoyle.

James McCormack and his family lived on Station Road (by Sutton Train Station—where Sutton meets Baldoyle), in ‘Sutton Cottages’ (or 'The Knock of Howth Cottages'). In the 1911 Census of Ireland James and Ann had three boarders listed as living in their home, her two brothers-in-law: James (47) and Lawrence Rooney (38), as well as a 'William Kennedy'—also later members of the Fingal branch of the ICA.

== Irish Citizen Army ==
James McCormack, Joseph McDonagh and Michael Nolan - socialists, activists and members of the United Irish League, were instrumental in the establishment of the Irish Transport and General Workers Union (ITGWU). They later organized its founding meeting in Baldoyle, Dublin. In 1913, McCormack, McDonagh and Nolan joined the Irish Citizen Army (ICA), founded by James Larkin, James Connolly, and ex-British officer, Jack White, in response to the Lockout of 1913.

The Irish Citizen Army (ICA) was an armed and well-trained body of civilian men & women whose aim was to defend workers and strikers, particularly from the frequent brutality of the Dublin Metropolitan Police. Though the ICA only numbered about 250 at most, their goal soon became the establishment of an independent and socialist Irish nation. Other prominent members included Constance Markievicz, Kit Poole, Francis Sheehy-Skeffington, Seán O'Casey and P. T. Daly. In 1916, they took part in the Easter Rising – an armed insurrection aimed at ending British rule in Ireland. The ICA uniform was dark green with a slouched hat and badge in the shape of the Red Hand of Ulster. Their banner was the Plough and the Stars. The significance of the banner was that a free Ireland would control its own destiny from the plough to the stars, and the symbolism of the flag was evident in its earliest inception of a plough with a sword as its blade. Taking inspiration from the bible and following the internationalist aspect of socialism it reflected the belief that war would be redundant with the rise of the Socialist International. This was flown by the Irish Citizens Army during the 1916 rising.

== The Easter Rising ==
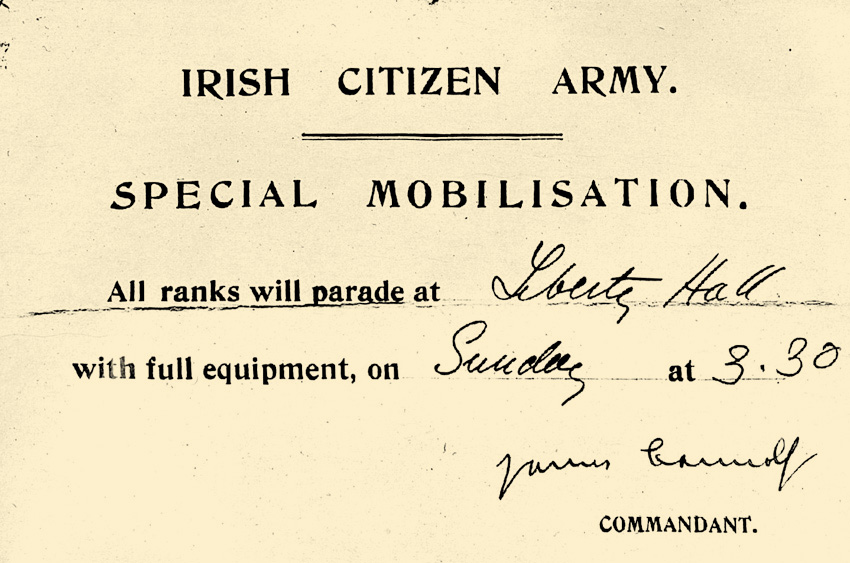
On Easter Monday morning in 1916, Lieutenant James McCormack, the Military Commanding Officer of the Baldoyle, Sutton and Howth branch of the ICA, led his battalion of men to Liberty Hall in Dublin to join the uprising against the oppression of the British Empire.

On Easter Monday morning in 1916, Lieutenant James McCormack, the Military Commanding Officer of the collective Baldoyle, Sutton and Howth branch (Fingal, Section 7) of the Dublin county contingent of the Irish Citizen's Army, led his battalion of men to Liberty Hall in Dublin city centre to join the uprising against the oppression of the British Empire. Members of the same battalion were already at work severing the communications of the Royal Irish Constabulary to London.

About 1,200 members of the Irish Volunteers and Irish Citizen Army mustered at several locations in central Dublin, among them members of the all-female Cumann na mBan.The British Imperial forces brought 20,000 in reinforcements, as well as artillery and a gunboat. A joint force of about 400 Volunteers and Citizen Army gathered at Liberty Hall under the command of Commandant James Connolly. This was the rebel headquarters, and it also included Commander-in-Chief Patrick Pearse, as well as Tom Clarke, Seán MacDermott and Joseph Plunkett. McCormack was assigned to the General Post Office, on Sackville Street (now "O'Connell Street"). Organised by members of the Military Council of the Irish Republican Brotherhood, the Rising began on (Easter Monday) 24 April 1916, and lasted for six days. Members of the Irish Volunteers — led by schoolmaster and Irish language activist Patrick Pearse, joined by the smaller Irish Citizen Army and 200 women of Cumann na mBan — seized key locations in Dublin and proclaimed an Irish Republic.

They marched to the General Post Office (GPO) on O'Connell Street, Dublin's main thoroughfare, occupied the building and hoisted two republican flags. Pearse stood outside and read the Proclamation of the Irish Republic. Copies of the Proclamation were also pasted on walls and handed out to bystanders by Volunteers and newsboys. The GPO would be the rebels' headquarters for most of the Rising. There was fierce street fighting on the routes into the city centre, where the rebels put up stiff resistance, slowing the British advance and inflicting heavy casualties. Elsewhere in Dublin, the fighting mainly consisted of sniping and long-range gun battles. The main rebel positions were gradually surrounded and bombarded with artillery shells.

Lieutenant McCormack served as a Military Commander (Fingal, Section 7) to James Connolly, the Commandant and Commander-in-Chief of the Dublin Brigade in The Easter Rising of 1916. McCormack was a member of the Irish Labour Party and the Irish Trades Union Congress and, like Connolly, an advocate of socialism.

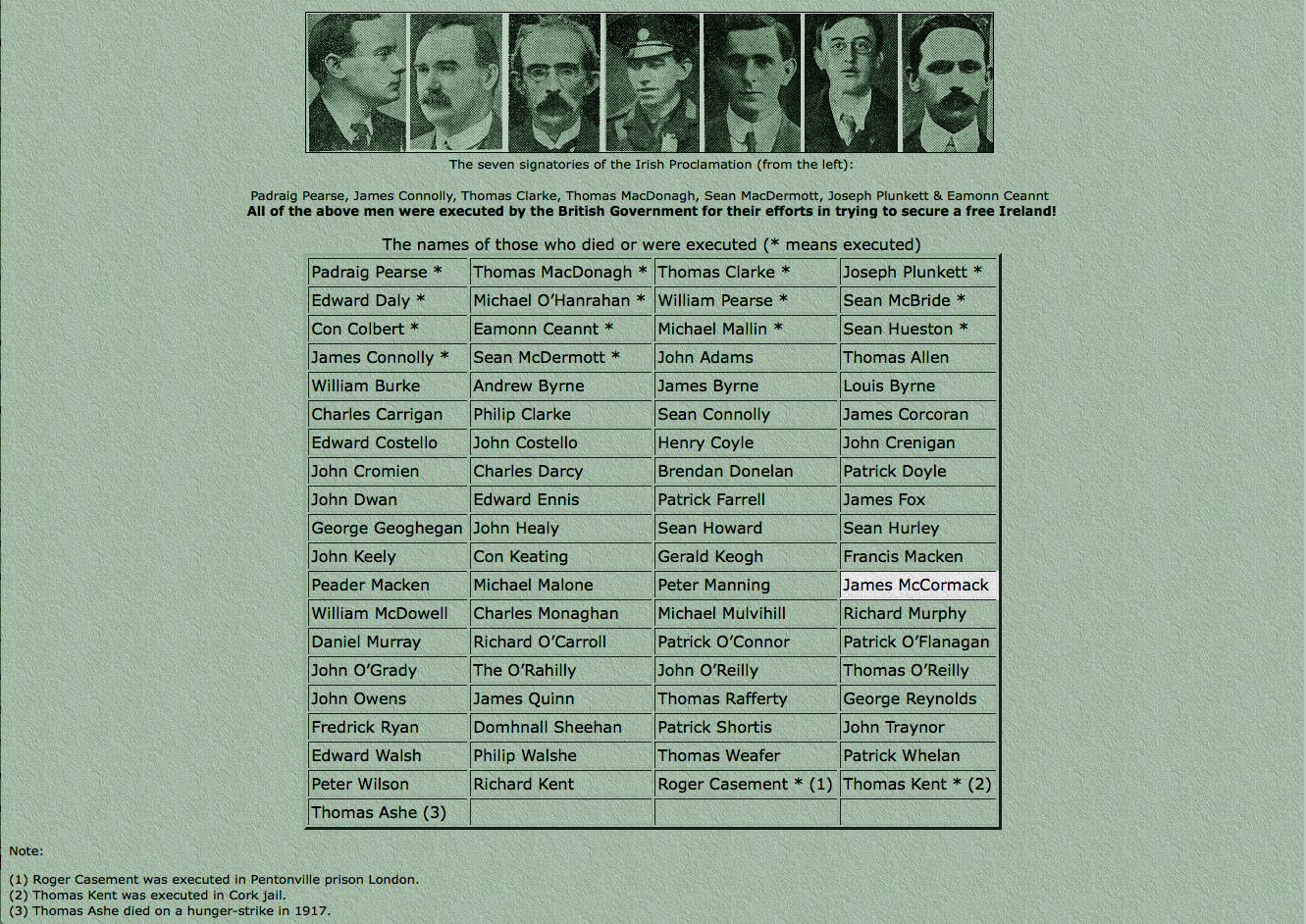
Lieutenant McCormack and his colleagues were stationed at the GPO, and during that faithful Easter Week on Wednesday, 26 April 1916, he was shot by a sniper's bullet. The location of his killing is variously recorded as in the GPO and Moore Lane area.

McCormack and his colleagues were stationed at the GPO, and during that faithful Easter Week on Wednesday, 26 April 1916, he was shot by a sniper's bullet. The location of his killing is variously recorded as in the GPO and Moore Lane. A total of eleven Citizen Army men were killed in action in the rising, in the City Hall/Dublin Castle, Stephen's Green and the GPO areas. Connolly issued orders to surrender following a week of relentless shelling by the British forces and the civilian casualties that ensued. He and his Chief of Staff Michael Mallin were executed by British army firing squad some weeks later. The surviving ICA members were interned in Frongoch in Wales and in English prisons for nine to 12 months.

The ICA was only rebel force that accepted female recruits so a number of women joined their ranks. The best known was the Countess Markievicz who became Honorary Treasurer and acted under Michael Mallin at St Stephen’s Green. It ceased to be a major military force in its own right, but former members donned uniforms again to provide a guard of honour at the funeral on Countess Markievicz in 1927, and again at the funeral of James Larkin in 1947.

== Posthumous decorations, commemorations and legacy ==
James McCormack was buried in Glasnevin Cemetery alongside many of his fallen comrades and joined the list of civilians and volunteers men and women who had given their life in the fight for the freedom and independence of Ireland—his name appears on the memorial there (also in Gaelic as ‘Seamus Mac Chormaic’).

In 1923, McCormack's wife Annie applied for a military dependent's pension on the grounds of her husbands death during the Easter Rising. She was awarded £90 for the duration of her widowhood and £24 per child until they reached the age of 18. Mrs McCormack died in 1928 at age 45 of tuberculosis. Her cousin Cecilia 'Sissy' Shaw took on the responsibility of raising her three sons.

The bronze medals awarded posthumously to James McCormack, for recognized military service to Ireland, are on a green and orange ribbon stamped with the message “Seachtmhain na Casga 1916”.

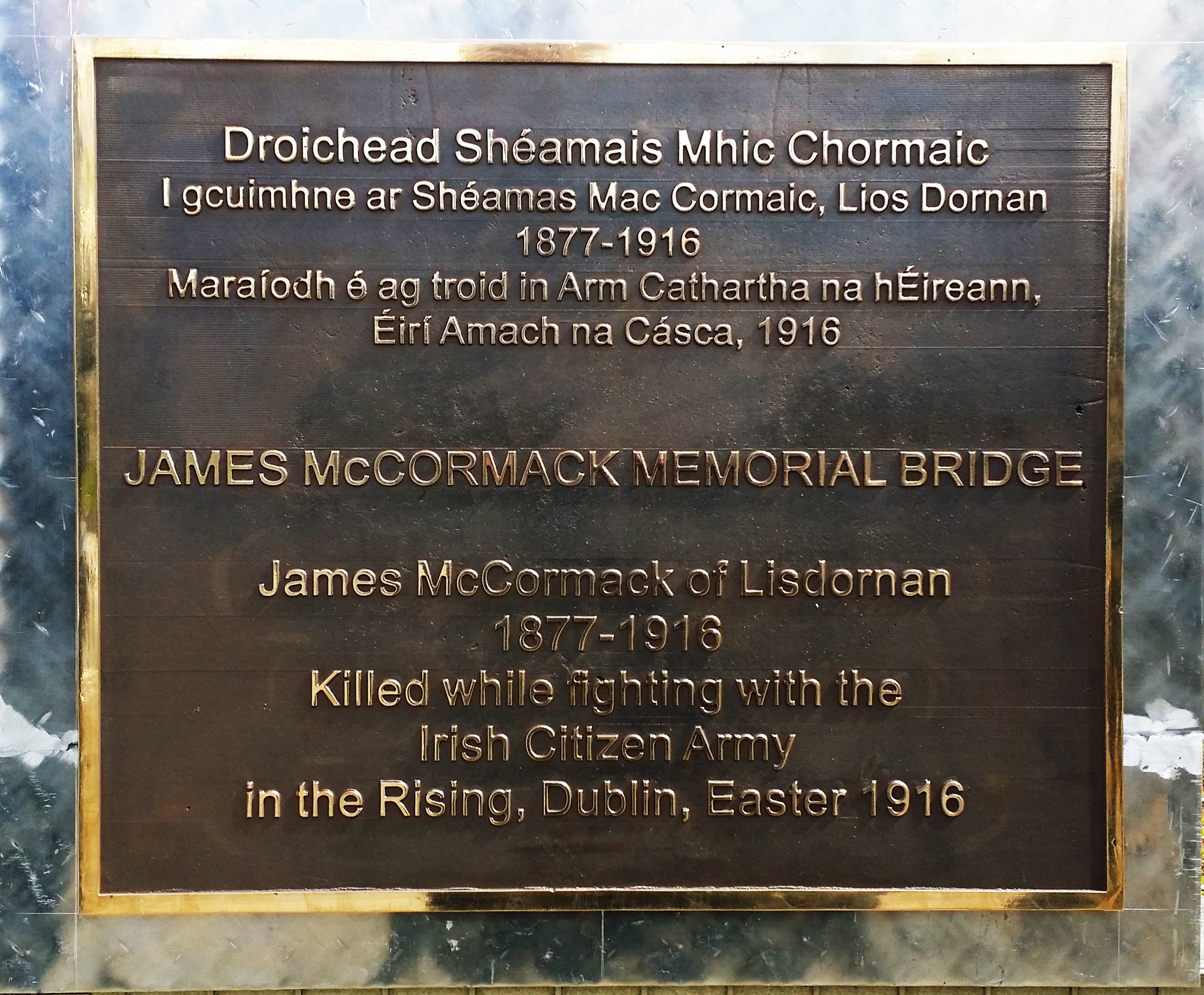
'James McCormack Memorial Bridge', 2016 bridge dedicated to McCormack

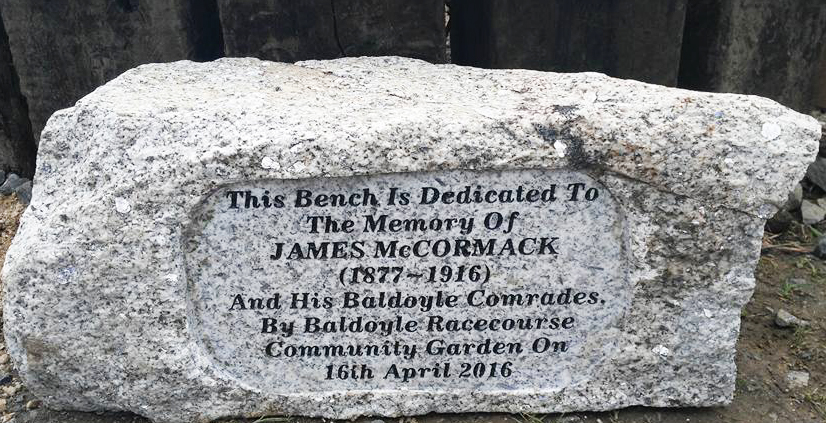
Commemorative bench and plaque

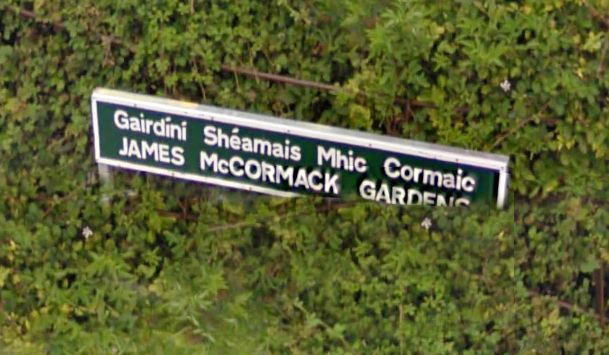
'James McCormack Gardens': the cul-de-sac dedicated in 1949 to McCormack

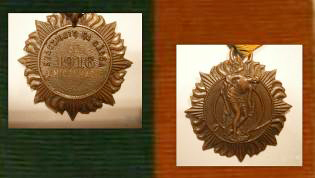
Lieutenant James McCormack's 1916 medals

A native of the Dardistown, Lisdornan and the Bellewstown area, Meath County Council and The Bellewstown Heritage Group unveiled a Commemoration Plaque to James McCormack on the Lisdornan/Dardistown boundary exactly 100 years to the day he was shot, newly named James McCormack Memorial Bridge.

In 2016, a one hundred-year commemorative plaque and park bench were dedicated in his name at the Baldoyle Racecourse Community Garden. Many of his descendants still living in Baldoyle/Sutton/Howth area, and from further afield, were able to attend this 2016 memorial and plaque installation.

James McCormack Gardens, named to his memory, is the secluded development of houses and private cul-de-sac built by the local authority off Burrowfield Road, Dublin in 1949. McCormack's son, Joseph, raised his family on that road, and his daughter, James senior's granddaughter, Ann McCormack, raised her family on Station Road in 'Sutton Cottages' - a few house down from where James and his family had lived from 1908.

In December 2015, local Dublin historian Philip O’Connor said at a lecture: “A diverse community, unlike any other, Howth, Sutton, and Baldoyle reveals an extraordinary story of a North Dublin rural and suburban community in a time of national revolution. Baldoyle produced the only substantial unit of the Citizen Army ... several of whom fought bravely and honourably in the 1916 Rising and later struggles including for social justice in the Free State of the hard 1920s.”
